= Langenberg (Rothaar) =

Mountain in Germany

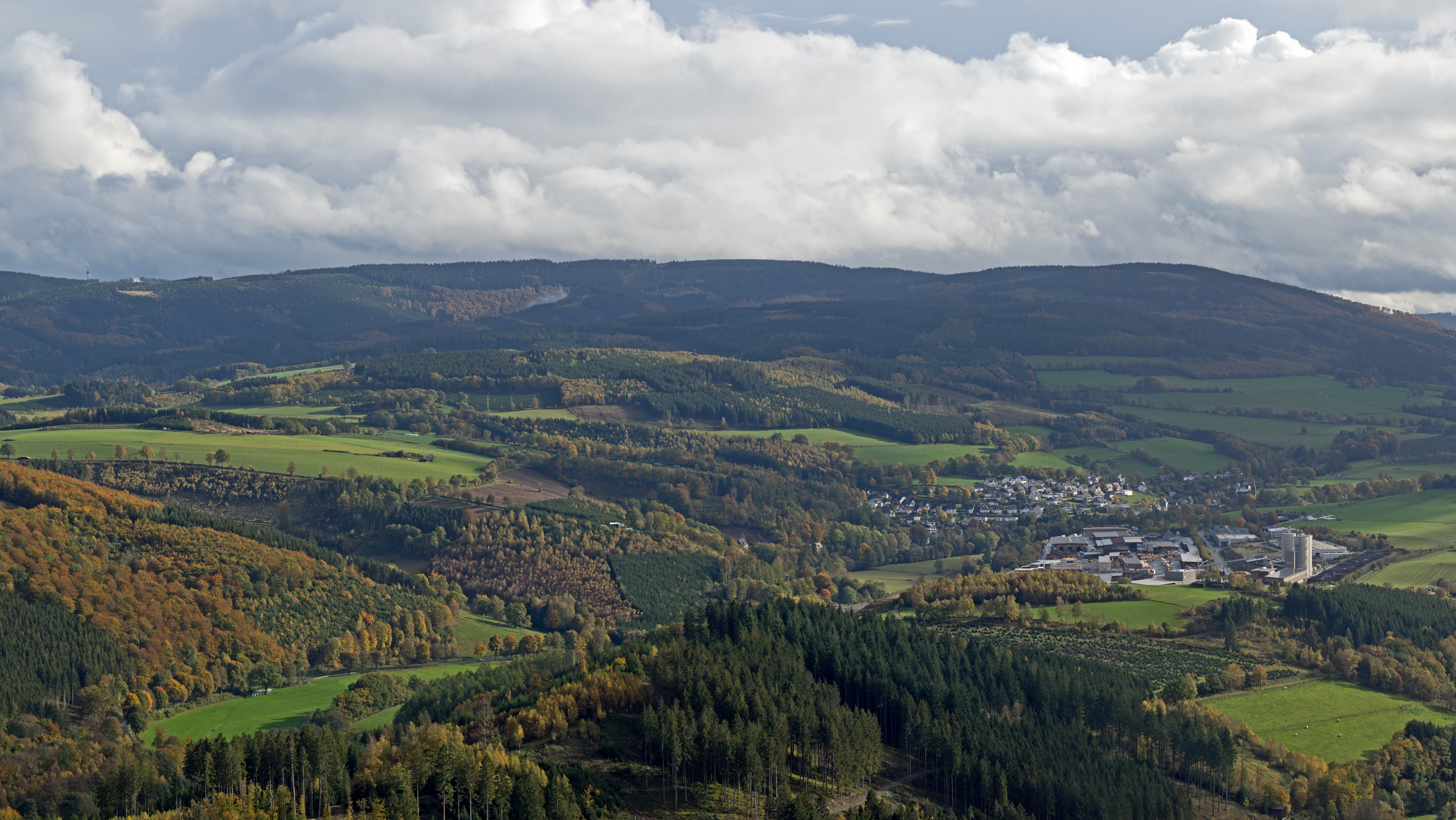
- The Langenberg in autumn seen from the northwest

Highest point
- Elevation: 843.2 m above sea level (NN) (2,766 ft)
- Prominence: 557 m (1,827 ft) ↓ Stadtallendorf-O
- Isolation: 116 km → Großer Feldberg (Taunus)
- Listing: Highest mountain in the Rothaar and in North Rhine-Westphalia
- Coordinates: 51°16′35″N 8°33′30″E

Geography
- Location within North Rhine-Westphalia
- Location: Hochsauerland, Upland; North Rhine-Westphalia, Hesse, Germany
- Parent range: Rothaar

The Langenberg (German pronunciation: [ˈlaŋənbɛʁk]) rises on the state border between North Rhine-Westphalia and Hesse in Germany and, at 843.2 m above sea level (NN), is the highest peak in the Rothaar mountain range, as well as the highest point in the North Rhine-Westphalia and also in the north of Germany outside the Harz Mountains.

== Location ==
The Langenberg lies on the border of the Hochsauerland (Westphalia) and Waldeck-Frankenberg (North Hesse) districts, where the Hochsauerland region transitions into the Upland, between Olsberg-Bruchhausen in the north-northwest, Willingen in the northeast and Niedersfeld (north of Winterberg) in the southwest. The Langenberg summit is about 10 m southwest of the Hessian-Westphalian state border.

The Langenberg's neighbouring peaks include the Hoppernkopf (805 m above NN) to the north, the Mittelsberg (801 m) to the east, the Hegekopf (842.9 m) to the east-southeast, the Hopperkopf (832.3 m) to the southeast, the Clemensberg (839.2 m) to the south-southwest and Auf dem Sternrodt (789.4 m) to the west.

The Burbecke stream emerges west of the Langenberg and the Raken on its northern flank, both within the catchment area of the Gierskoppbach. The Langenberg is passed to the east in a south–north direction by the upper reaches of the Hoppecke, into which a small brook runs that comes out of a valley - Der Keller ("The Cellar") - on the southeast side of the mountain. South of the Langenberg are the crosstracks known as the Oberer Burbecker Platz and Unterer Burbecker Platz. A section of the long-distance footpath known as the Rothaarsteig runs by the summit to the west in a north–south direction, passing a historic boundary stone.

There few trees on the Langenberg's rounded summit itself and it widens out into a mountain heathland to the east; the rest of the mountain is, however, thickly forested.

== Height ==
About 15 m south-southeast of the Langenberg summit, shown on the German Topographical Map (Deutsche Grundkarte) as being 843.2 m above NN, and about 20 m southwest of the aforementioned state border, there is a triangulation station of the German Primary Triangulation Network at a height of 843.1 m above NN (i.e. 10 cm lower).

At the summit is a stone with a metal plate inscribed as follows: Langenberg 843 m über N.N. − höchster Berg in N R W ("Langenberg 843 m above N.N. − highest mountain in N R W").

Erroneously, the Kahler Asten near Winterberg is often cited as the highest mountain in the region. This is only 841.9 m above NN, but is much better known than the Langenberg due to its weather station and because its mountaintop restaurant in the Astenturm and its 862 m high observation tower are popular local destinations.

The highest accessible point in the Rothaar Mountains is the observation platform of the Hochheideturm near Willingen (Hesse) with a height of 875.5 m.

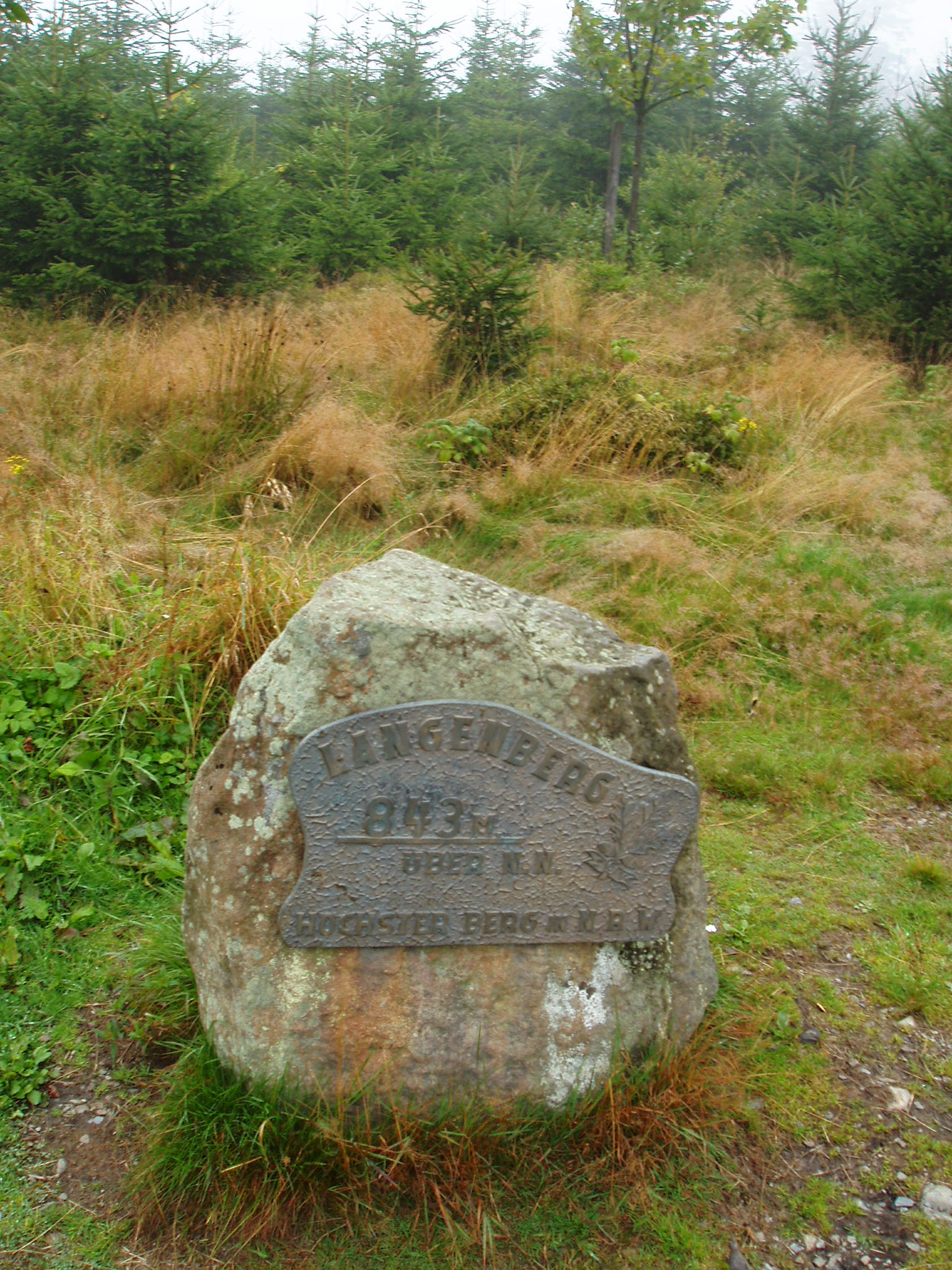
Stone on the summit in summer...

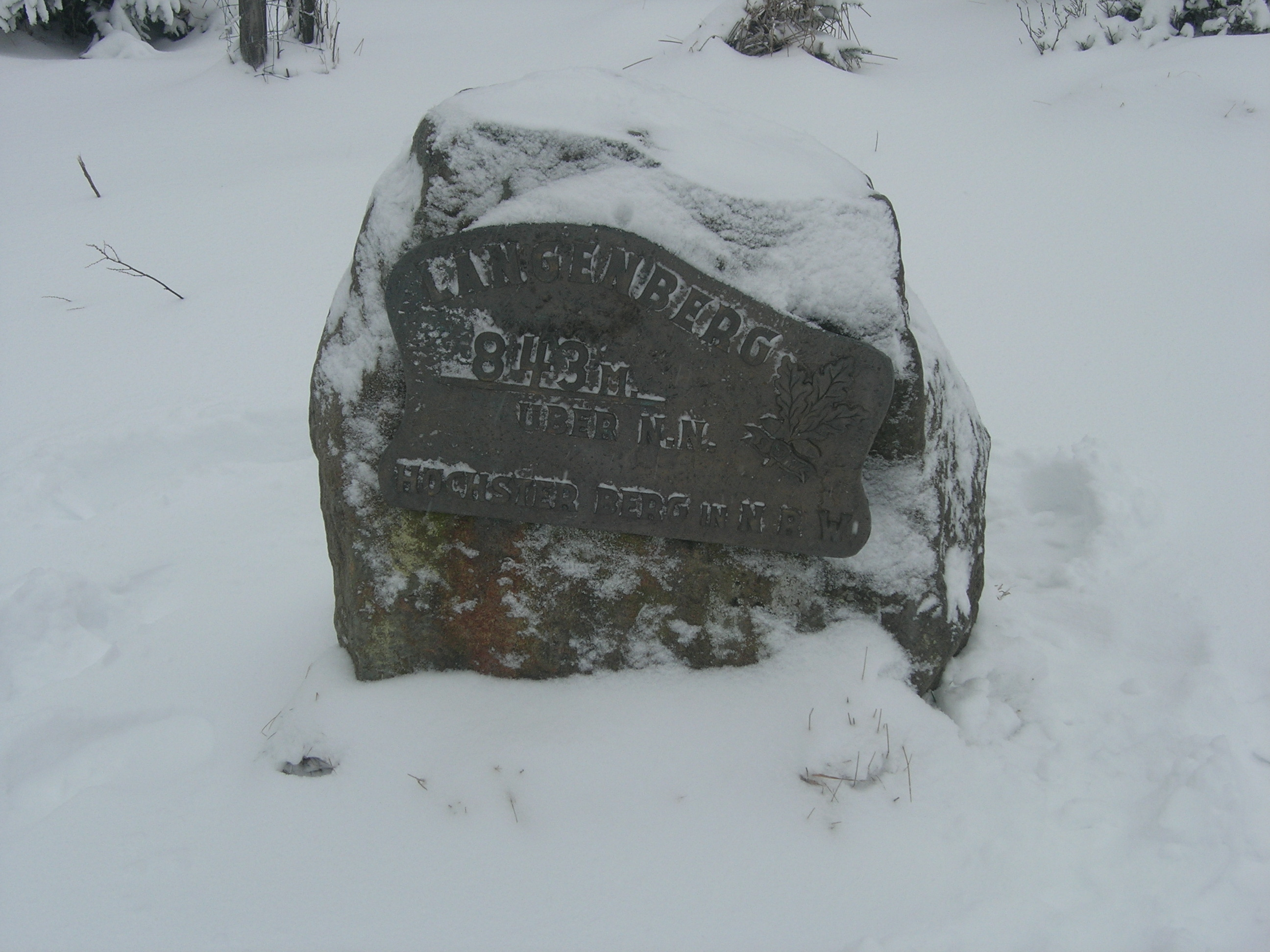
...and in winter

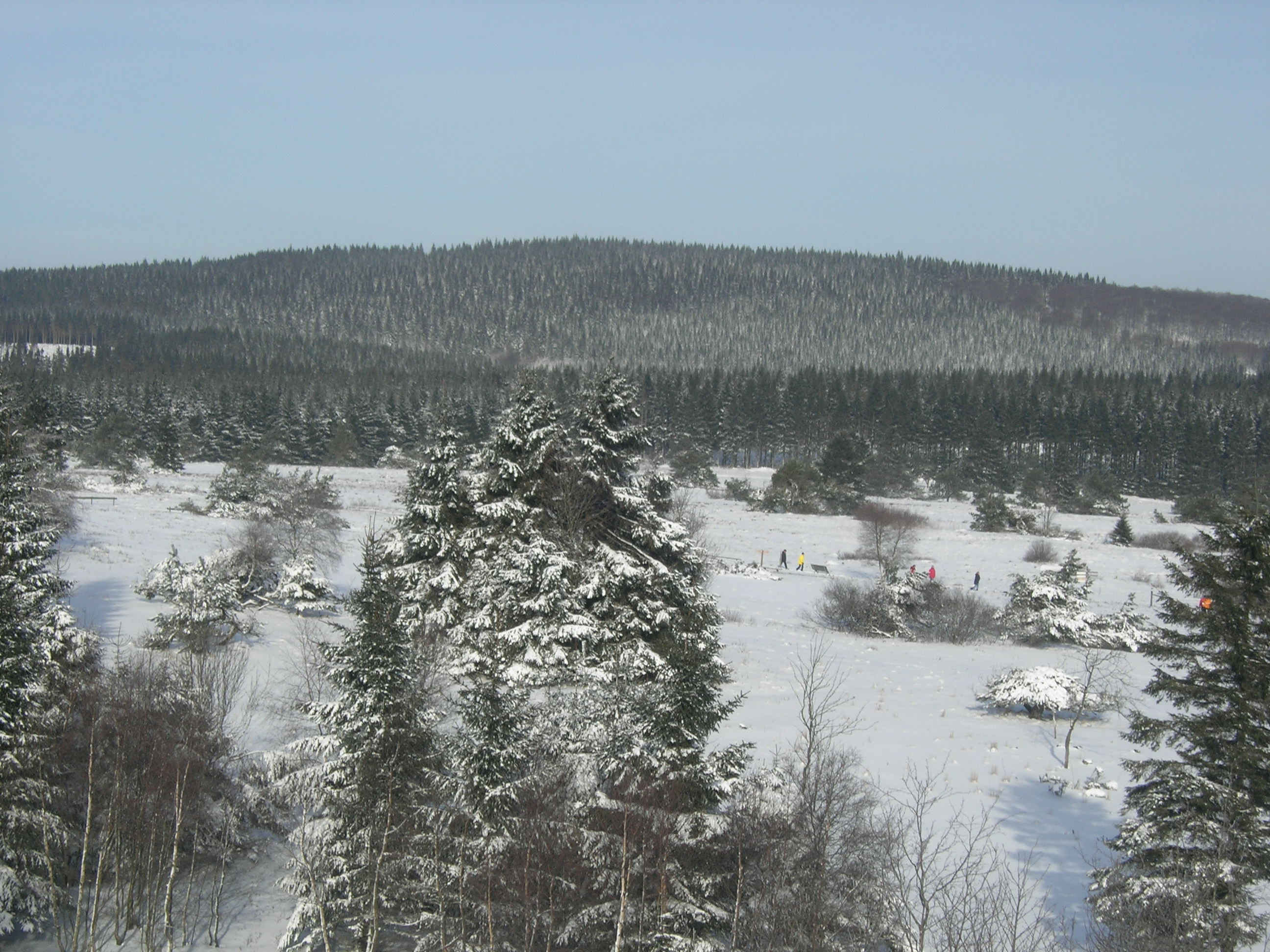
The Langenberg in winter seen from the Clemensberg

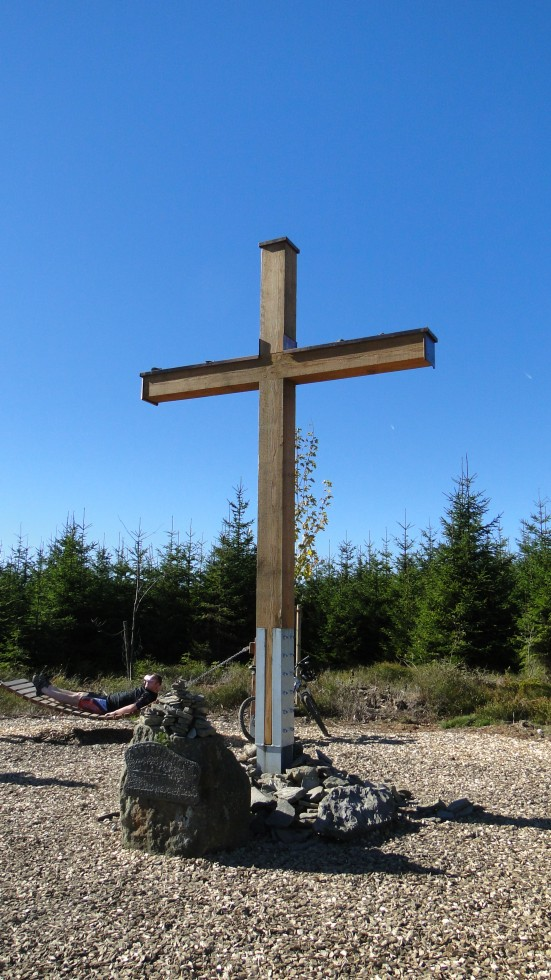
The summit cross was erected in 2010.

== See also ==
- List of mountains and hills in North Rhine-Westphalia
