= Hohe Egge (Upland) =

Mountain in Hesse, Germany

- Location within Hesse

Highest point
- Elevation: 604.9 m above sea level (NHN) (1,985 ft)
- Coordinates: 51°19′32″N 8°42′19″E

Geography
- Location: Near Ottlar; Waldeck-Frankenberg, North Hesse (Germany)
- Parent range: Upland (Rothaar)

The Hohe Egge near Ottlar in the North Hessian county of Waldeck-Frankenberg is a hill, 604.9 m above sea level (NHN), in the Upland in the Rothaar mountains.

== Location ==
The Hohe Egge lies in the Upland, the northeastern foothills of the Rothaar mountains, in the Diemelsee Nature Park between Willingen and Diemelsee reservoir. Its summit rises 850 metres southeast of the village church of Ottlar, 2.5 km southwest of Giebringhausen and 2.2 km northwest of Deisfeld, which are all in the municipality of Diemelsee, and 1.9 km (both as the crow flies) north-northeast of Hemmighausen, which is in the municipality of Willingen. The hills is on the territory of Diemelsee; a tip of Willingen's territory also extends into it in the south.

The northern spur of the Hohe Egge is called the Harberg (554.3 m), its eastern spur is the Niegelscheid (580.7 m) and its southern spur is unnamed (601.0 m). The Diemel runs past the hill to the east, feeding the eastern arm of the Diemelsee and, after flowing through the reservoir, continues down to the Weser. To the northwest the Holzbach stream runs through Ottlar flowing northeast and a little above the eastern arm of the reservoir into the Diemel.

== Natural region classification ==
The Hohe Egge belongs to the major unit group of Süder Uplands (No. 33), the major unit of the Rothaar Mountains (with the High Sauerland) (333) and the sub-unit of the Upland (333.9). Most of it falls within the natural region of Inner Upland (333.90). Its northern and eastern slopes descend into the major unit of the East Sauerland Foothills (332) and the sub-unit of Adorf Bay (Vorupländer Adorfer Bucht, 332.6) in the natural region of Vorupland Hill Country (Vorupländer Hügelland, 332.61).
