= Mühlenkopf =

Mountain in Hesse, Germany

Coordinates: 51°16′21″N 8°36′13″E

Highest point
- Elevation: 825 m (2,707 ft)

Geography
- Location: Landkreis Waldeck-Frankenberg, Hesse, Germany

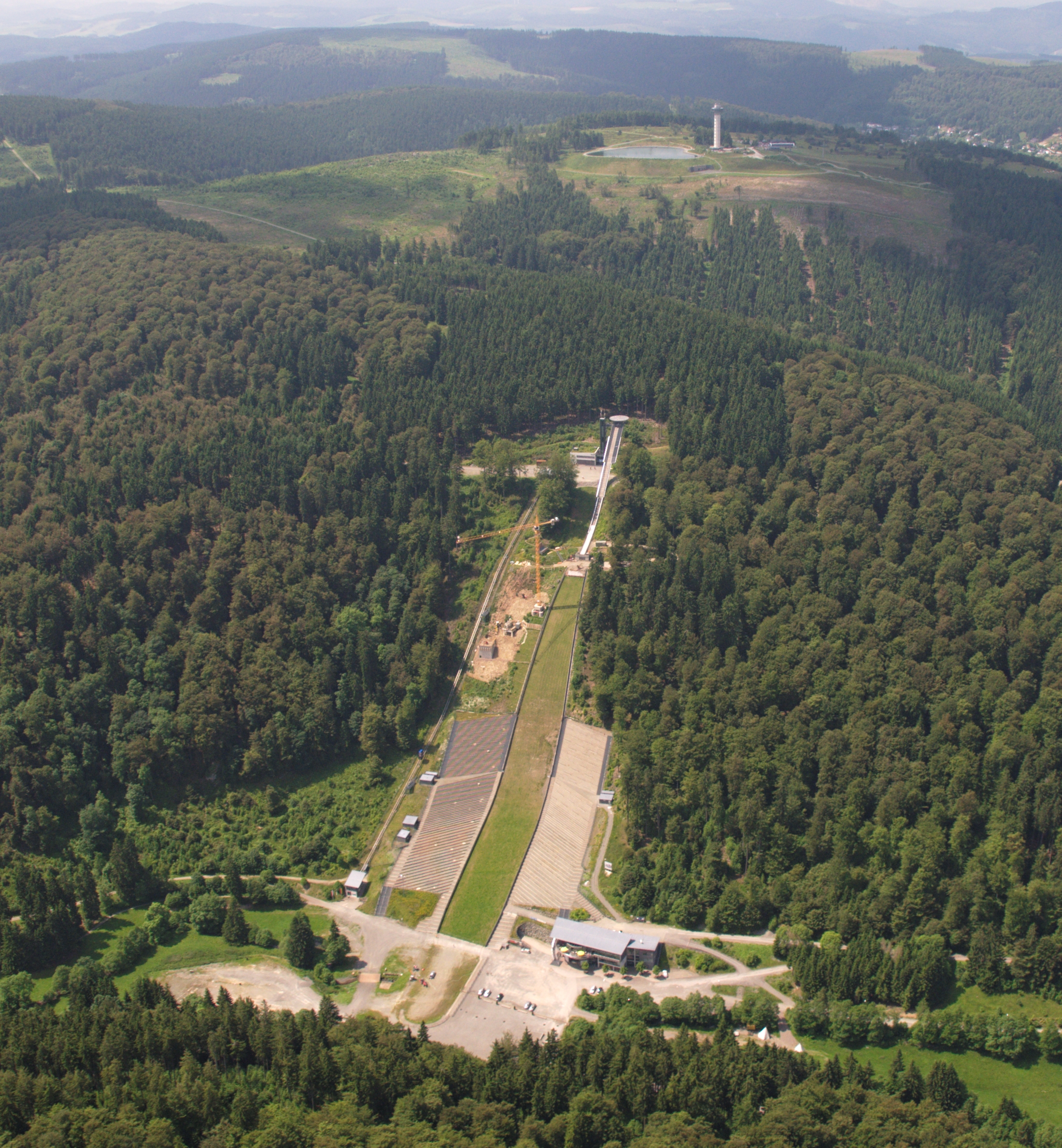
Mühlenkopf

Mühlenkopf is a mountain of Landkreis Waldeck-Frankenberg, Hesse, Germany.

The Mühlenkopf lies in the northeastern part of the Rothaar Mountains within the Diemelsee Nature Park. Its summit rises approximately 2.5 km south of the town center of Willingen and 1.5 km southwest of the Willingen district of Stryck . It is northeast of the Hegekopf mountain (842.9m) and south-southeast of the Ettelsberg mountain (837.7m). The Itter, a tributary of the Diemel, flows east of the wooded hill. Several hiking trails and paths converge at a crossroads at the "Große Grube" (Great Pit) at an elevation of 798m between the Mühlenkopf and Hegekopf.
