= Upland (mountain range) =

Region of Hesse, Germany

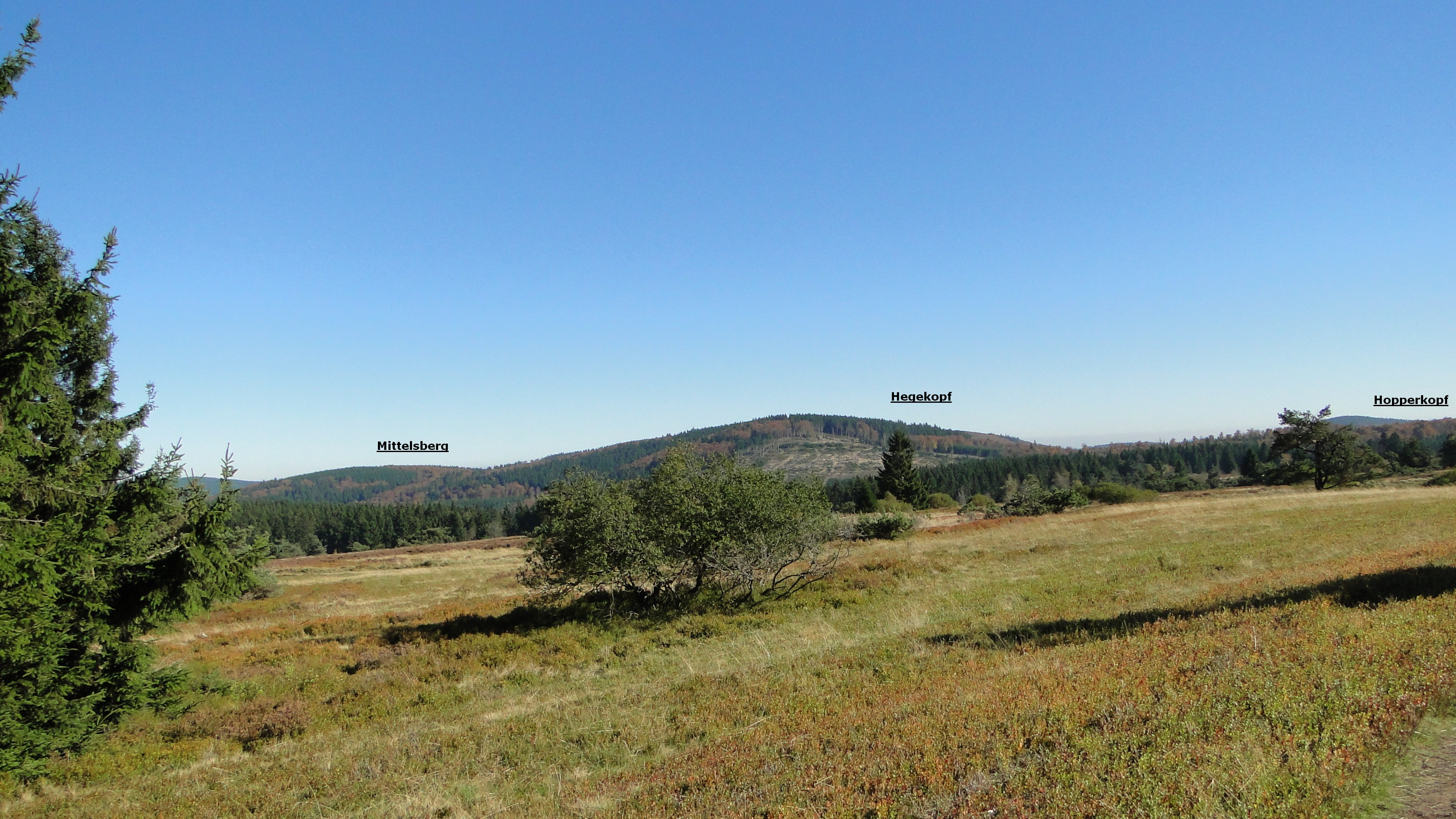
View of the Upland from the Niedersfelder Hochheide. The Hegekopf is in the centre.

The Upland (Low German for Oberland "highland") is a low mountain region forming the northeastern part of the High Sauerland and belongs the German state of Hesse, unlike the remainder of the High Sauerland which lies in Westphalia. The Upland falls within the district of Waldeck-Frankenberg, in North Hesse and corresponds to the territory of the municipality of Willingen.

== Geography ==
The historic Upland lies in the southwestern area of the Diemelsee Nature Park at an average height of 500 to 700 m above NN. The northwestern and southwestern parts are almost entirely forested, whilst the centre, the area formally defined as a natural region called Upland (see below), only has islands of woods around some of the peaks.

=== Natural regions ===
The historic Upland lies predominantly in the northwestern Rothaar Mountains mountain range with smaller elements also in the East Sauerland foothills. It incorporates the natural region of Upland, as well as the (northeastern) half of the natural region of Langenberg, which contains the highest peak in the Rothaargebirge, the 843,1 m high Langenberg, as well as other summits over 800 m high.

The following natural regions lie wholly or partly (see brackets) in the historic Upland:

- 33 Süder Uplands
  - 332 East Sauerland Foothills
    - 332.6 (Fore Upland) Adorf Bay
      - 332.60 Flechtdorf Höckerflur (extreme west only)
  - 333 Rothaar Mountains
    - 333.5 Winterberg Highland
      - 333.58 Langenberg (northeast half)
    - 333.8 Hochsauerland Schlucht Mountains
      - 333.82 Schellhorn and Treis Forests (extreme southeast)
    - 333.9 Upland
      - 333.90 Inner Upland (apart from the extreme north)
      - 333.91 Fore Upland Ridge (west and centre only)

=== Geology ===
The soils of the Upland are based mainly on Upper Devonian marl, argillaceous shale and calcareous sandstone. This combination has produced good soils for arable farming. As a result, the forests were cleared very early on and replaced by wood pasture (the East Sauerland "mountain heaths").

=== Mountains ===
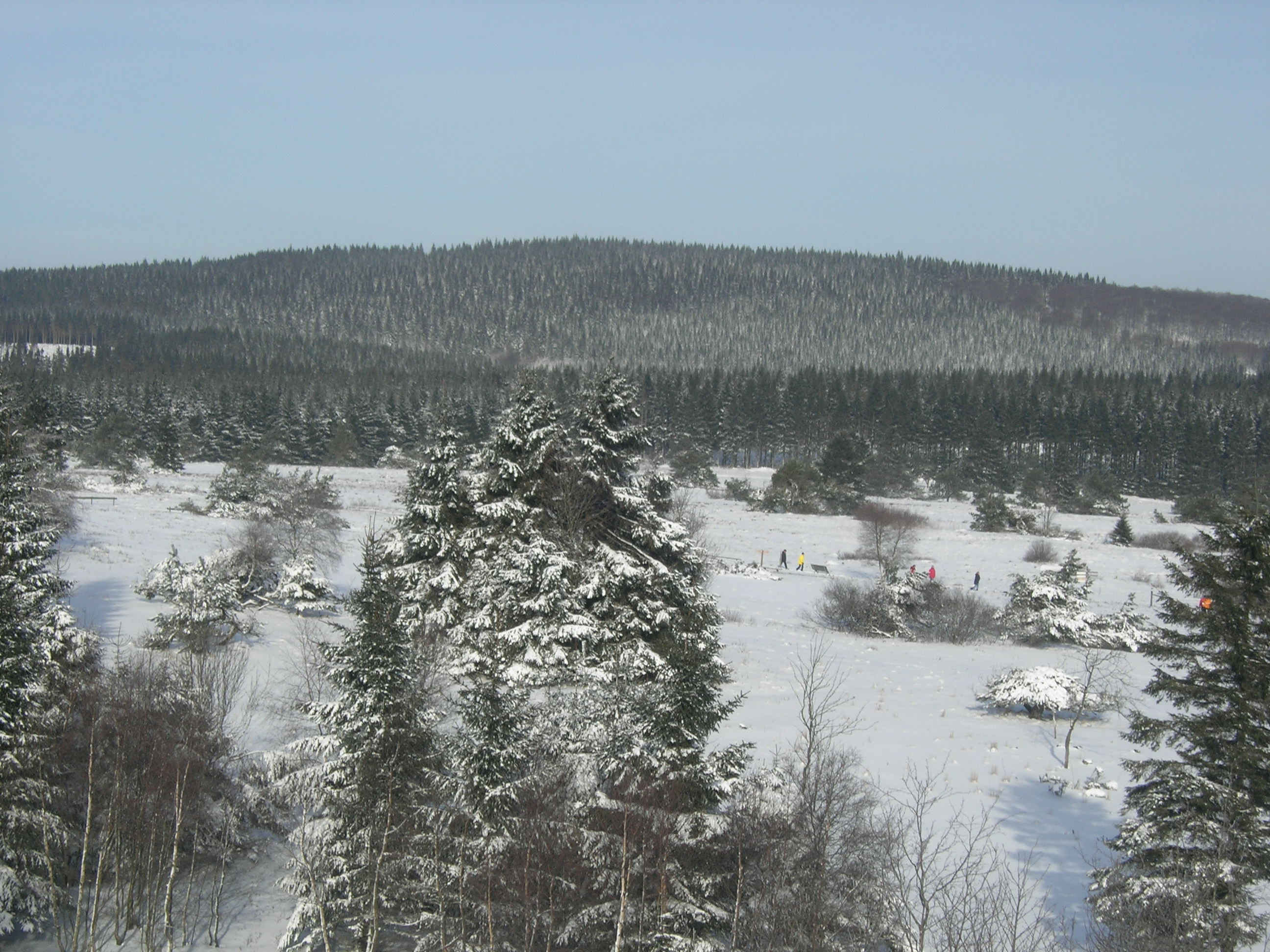
February 2008 winter view of the Langenberg

The highest mountain in the Upland is the Langenberg (843.2 m above sea level (NN)), which is located immediately next to the border with neighbouring North-Rhine-Westphalia (and just on the Westphalian side). The almost equally high Hegekopf (842.9 m) lies opposite and entirely on Hessian territory.

Since autumn 2002 the Ettelsberg (837.7 m) has had an observation platform on the Hochheideturm with a height of 875 m.

Amongst the mountains of the Upland (including all the "eight hundreds") are those in the following list. They are sorted by height in metres above Normalnull (NN) (natural regions in italics; mountains on the state border with North Rhine-Westphalia are asterisked (*)):

- Langenberg* (843.2 m) - Langenberg
- Hegekopf (842.9 m) - Langenberg
- Ettelsberg (837.7 m) - Langenberg with Hochheideturm
- Hopperkopf (832.3 m) - Langenberg
- Mühlenkopf (ca. 825 m) - Langenberg; with Mühlenkopfschanze
- Hoher Eimberg* (806.1 m) - Schellhorn and Treis Forests
- Hoppernkopf* (805.0 m) - Langenberg/Schellhorn and Treis Forests
- Mittelsberg (801 m) - Langenberg
- Hohe Pön (792,7 m) - Langenberg
- Krutenberg* (785.0 m) - Langenberg
- Dreiskopf* (781 m) - Schellhorn and Treis Forests
- Kahle Pön (775.3 m) - Inner Upland
- Emmet (742.5 m) - Langenberg
- Auf'm Knoll* (738 m) - Langenberg/Inner Upland
- Dommel (738.0 m) - Schellhorn and Treis Forests; with Dommelturm
- Sähre (726 m) - Inner Upland
- Iberg (720.5 m) - Inner Upland
- Osterkopf (708.5 m) - Inner Upland
- Orenberg (702 m) - Inner Upland

=== Rivers ===
The Rhine-Weser watershed runs through the Langenberg natural region, beyond the western perimeter of the historic Upland. East of this the majority of the rivers drain into the Diemel and flow in a north to northeasterly direction. They are, from west to east (source regions in brackets):

- Hoppecke (Langenberg)
- Itter (Langenberg)
- Aarbach (Langenberg)
- Diemel (Inner Upland)
- Rhene (source on the Fore Upland Ridge, but outside the historic Upland)

Through the Fore Upland Ridge (Vorupländer Rücken), in a west-southwest to east-northeast direction, runs the watershed between the Diemel and the Eder, south of which the Neerdar rises in the Inner Upland, whose upper reaches flow through the southeast of the historic Upland.

=== Towns and villages ===
- Heringhausen (Diemelsee) is a recognized health resort. In 2023, the place has a 1000-year history.
- Willingen and its incorporated villages of Usseln, Schwalefeld, Rattlar, Eimelrod, Bömighausen, Hemmighausen, Neerdar and Welleringhausen.
