= Hohe Egge =

Hohe Egge is the name of the following hills in Germany:

- Hohe Egge (Upland) (604.9 m), in the Upland, Rothaar Mountains, near Ottlar, county of Waldeck-Frankenberg, Hesse
- Hohe Egge (Süntel) (ca. 440 m), on the Süntel ridge, near Bad Münder am Deister, county of Hameln-Pyrmont, Lower Saxony
- Hohe Egge (Selter) (395,0 m), in the Selter, near Ammensen, county of Holzminden, Lower Saxony

Hohe Egge is also the name of a hillock and settlement area:

- Hohe Egge (Sprockhövel), in the quarter of Niedersprockhövel, part of Sprockhövel, Ennepe-Ruhr-Kreis, North Rhine-Westphalia
