= Diemelsee (disambiguation) =

Diemelsee may refer to the follow places in Germany:

- Diemelsee, a reservoir on the border of Hesse and North Rhine-Westphalia
- Diemelsee (municipality), a municipality in Northwest Hesse
- Diemelsee Nature Park in Hesse and North Rhine-Westphalia
