= Diemelsee =

Diemelsee, Diemel Reservoir Diemelstausee, Diemeltalsperre
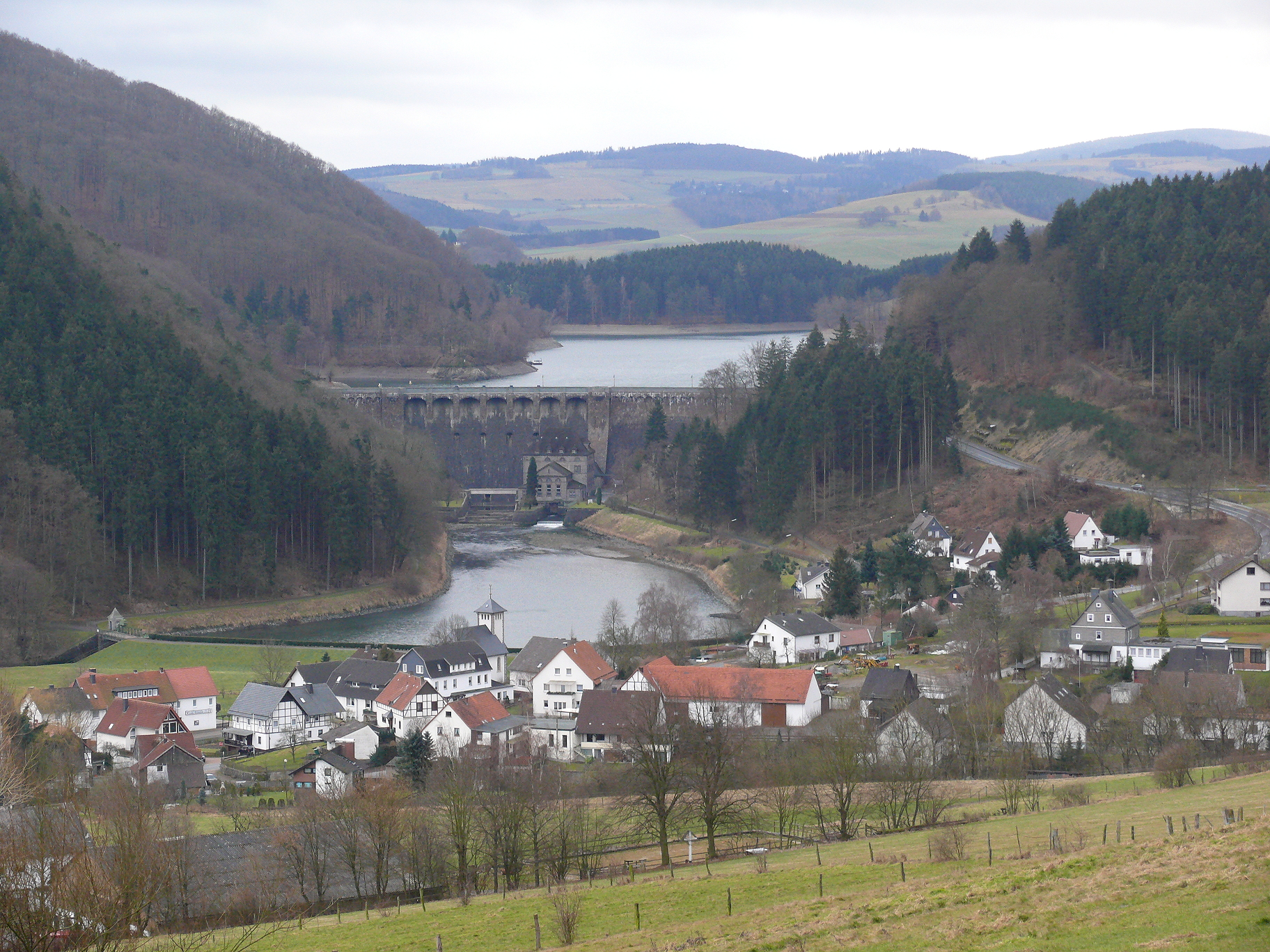
- The Diemel Dam: dam and reservoir, compensating basin (Ausgleichsweiher) and power station. Foreground: the village of Helminghausen. Left: the Eisenberg
- Interactive map of Diemelsee, Diemel Reservoir; Diemelstausee, Diemeltalsperre
- Location: Waldeck-Frankenberg (HE), Hochsauerlandkreis (NW)
- Coordinates: 51.37222°N 8.72389°E
- Construction began: 1912 to 1914 and 1919 to 1923

Dam and spillways
- Impounds: Diemel, Itter
- Height (foundation): 42 m
- Height (thalweg): 36.2 m
- Length: 194 m
- Width (crest): 7 m
- Width (base): 31 m
- Dam volume: 72,000 m³
- Spillway capacity: 113 m³/s

Reservoir
- Total capacity: 21.75 M m³
- Active capacity: 19.9 M m³
- Catchment area: 103 km²
- Surface area: 1.65 km²
- Maximum length: 4 km (Diemel arm), 3.1 km (Itter arm)
- Maximum width: 300 m
- Normal elevation: 376.2 m above sea level (NHN)

Power Station
- Installed capacity: 1.04 MW

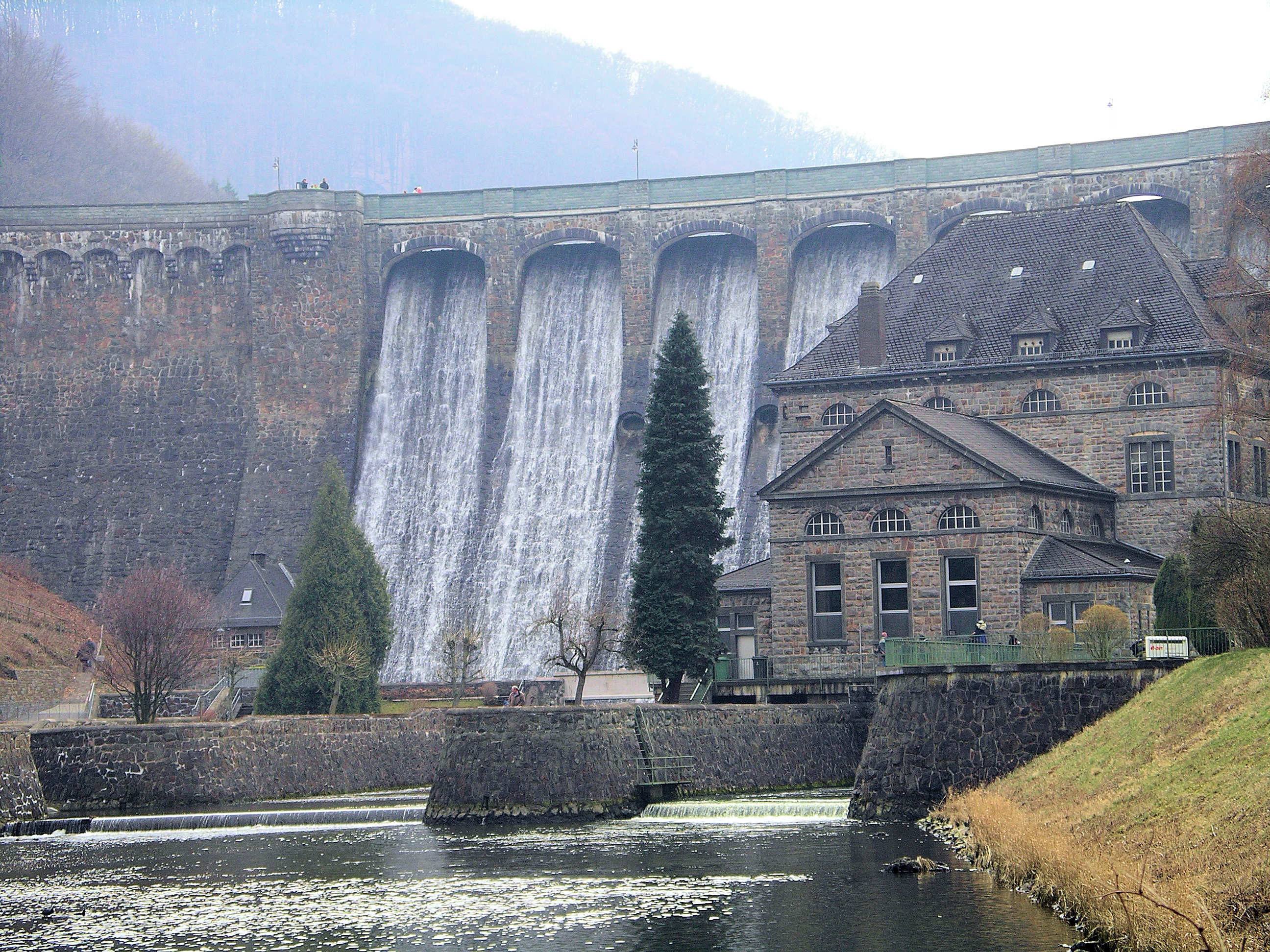
Dam and power station from the north

The Diemelsee (German pronunciation: [ˈdiːml̩ˌzeː]) or Diemel Reservoir (German: Diemelstausee) is a reservoir with a surface area of 1.65 km² and about capacity of 19.9 million m³ on the River Diemel in the counties of Waldeck-Frankenberg in North Hesse, and Hochsauerlandkreis, Westphalia, Germany.

It is part of the Diemeltalsperre hydropower system (DiT) comprising the Diemel Dam, the equalizing basin, the power plant and the reservoir itself, owned by the Federal Waterway and Navigation Authority and managed by its Hann. Münden office. The Diemel Reservoir, along with the Edersee is part of the water regulation structure in the catchment area of the River Weser.

== Location ==
The Diemelsee is located a few kilometres northeast of the Upland in the northeastern foothills of the Rothaar Mountains that lie in the northeast of the Rhenish Massif. It lies mainly within the county of Waldeck-Frankenberg, its smaller northern section and its dam belong to the county of Hochsauerlandkreis. In is also within the Diemelsee Nature Park between Willingen and Marsberg on the territory of Diemelsee and the borough of Marsberg on the River Diemel and its tributary, the Itter. Its dam stands about 500 metres south of the village of Helminghausen (southwest of Marsberg). The only shoreline village is Heringhausen.

The Diemelsee lies in a forested Central Upland countryside, whose highest point in the vicinity of the reservoir is the Köpfchen (ca. 610 m above sea level (NHN); west of the Itterarm in the west). Immediately east-southeast of the dam rises the Eisenberg (594.6 m) and a few kilometres to the south of the dam is the mountain of Koppen (715.1 m).

== Panorama ==
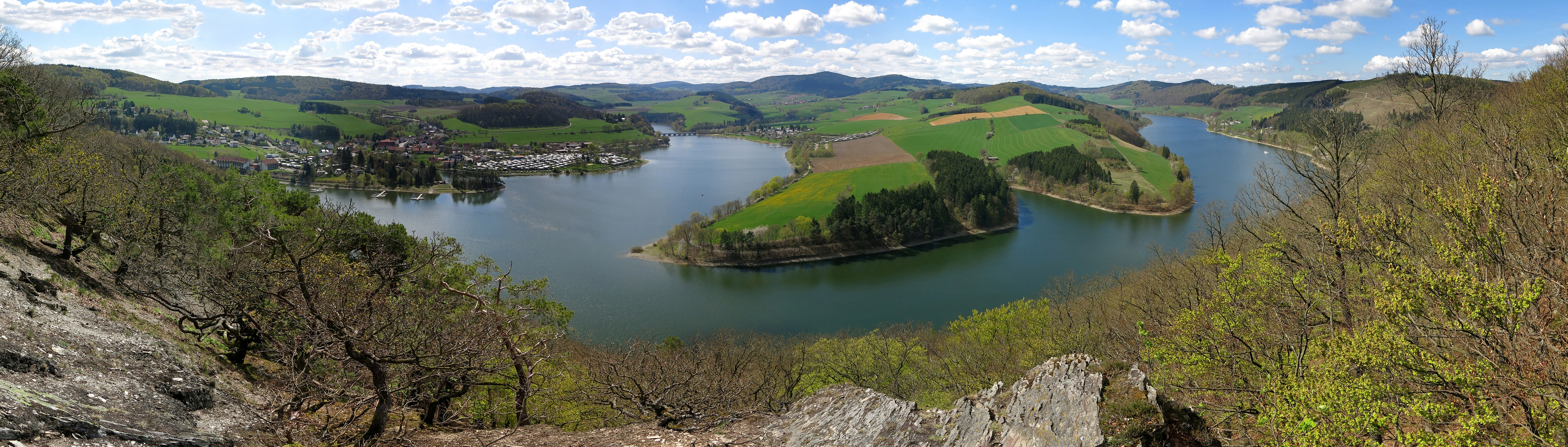
View of St. Muffert over the Diemelsee

== See also ==
- List of dams in Germany

== Literature ==
- Peter Franke, Wolfgang Frey: Talsperren in der Bundesrepublik Deutschland. Herausgegeben vom Nationalen Komitee für Grosse Talsperren in der Bundesrepublik Deutschland (DNK) und Deutscher Verband für Wasserwirtschaft und Kulturbau e. V. (DVWK), Systemdruck-GmbH, Berlin, 1987, ISBN 3-926520-00-0.
- Paul Gerecke: Die Diemeltalsperre. In: Zeitschrift für Bauwesen, 75th annual, 10th–12th issue (Ingenieurbauteil), 1925, pp. 93–104.
