= Dommel (mountain) =

Mountain in Hesse, Germany

Highest point
- Elevation: 738 m (2,421 ft)
- Prominence: 150 m (490 ft)
- Coordinates: 51°20′N 8°41′E

Geography
- Location: Landkreis Waldeck-Frankenberg, Hesse, Germany

Dommel is a 738 m (2,421 ft) high mountain of Landkreis Waldeck-Frankenberg, Hesse, Germany. It is part of the Rothaar Mountains.
