= Heringhausen (Diemelsee) =

Place in Hesse, Germany

- Ortsteil of Diemelsee
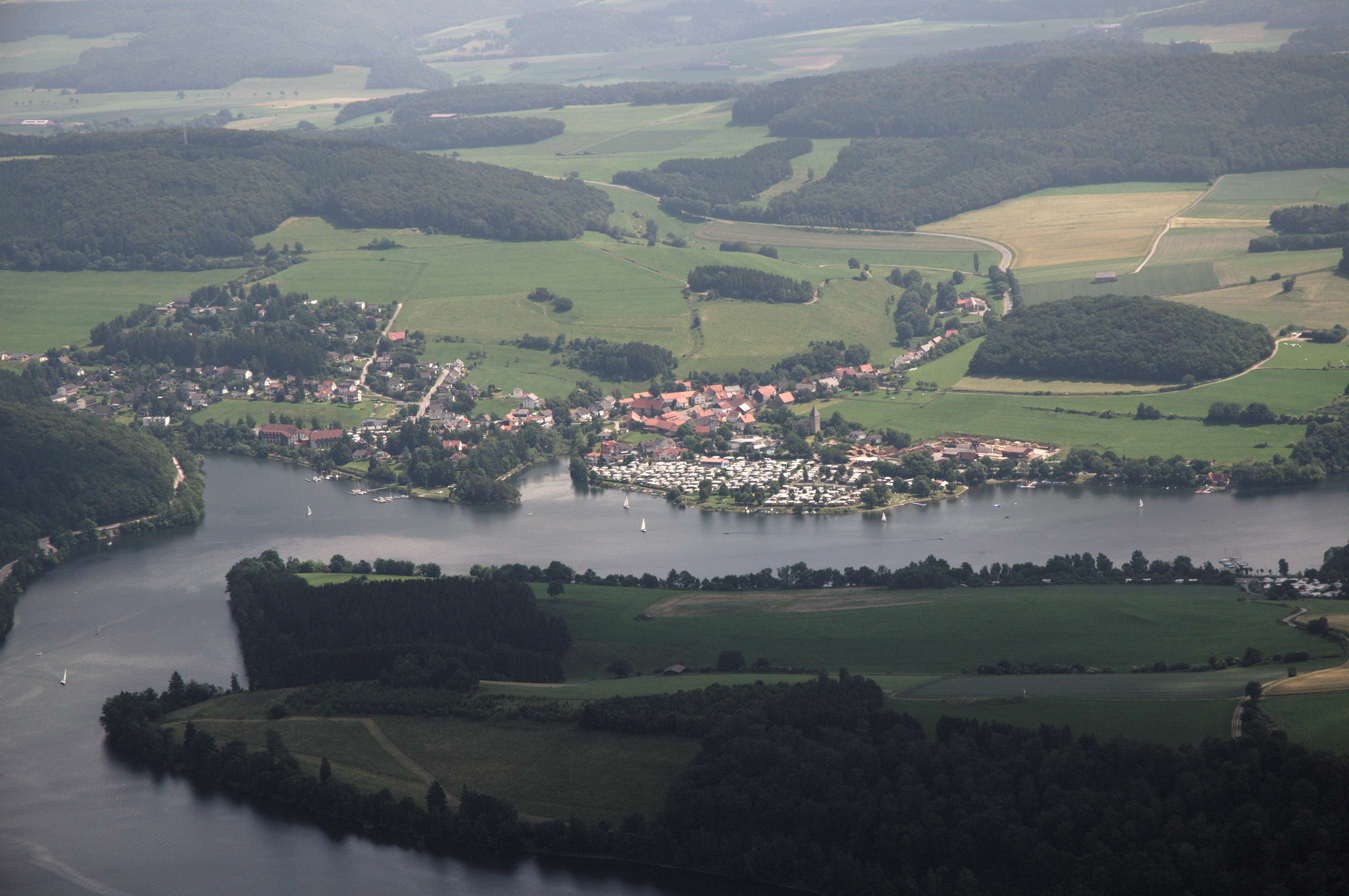
- View on Heringhausen

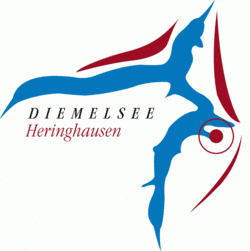
- Coat of arms
- Interactive map of Heringhausen
- Location within Germany Location within Hesse
- Coordinates: 51°21′51″N 8°43′56″E
- Country: Germany
- State: Hesse
- Admin. region: Kassel
- District: Waldeck-Frankenberg
- Municipality: Diemelsee
- Time zone: UTC+01:00 (CET)
  - Summer (DST): UTC+02:00 (CEST)
- Postal codes: 34519
- Dialling codes: 05633
- Vehicle registration: KB, WA
- Website: Luftkurort Heringhausen

Heringhausen in the area of Waldeck, Upland and Sauerland, is a village in the municipality Diemelsee in northern Hesse, Germany. Heringhausen is a recognized health resort.

== Etymology ==
Several variants are known concerning the origin of the place name Heringhausen. Originally the name consisted of a composition of -inghūsen and the personal name Hard(i)/Hardo, which is attributed to the word stem "Hardu" (too German old-language hard ' strong, strong, bold'). In the literature, interpretations are given to it: "at the houses of the people of Hard(i)/Hardo". Later Latin or Middle High German documents for the monastery Kaufungen the place names Hardinghuson (1023), Herdinchußen, Herdynckhusen and Hertighusin are documented as earlier place names. In further documents appears "Heriwardeshuson" (1043).

== Geography ==
Heringhausen is located between Dortmund and Kassel south of Paderborn, approximately in the middle of a triangle with the verticepoints of Korbach, Brilon and Marsberg in the nature park Diemelsee. All settlement areas of Heringhausen are situated on the banks of the Diemelstausee. Through the town passes the national road 3078.

== History ==
=== Historical area assignment ===
Historically, the village is located in Ittergau. Until about 700 AD, the region was Saxon, until the Franconian took over the supremacy. Heringhausen was located in the border region between the Duchy of Saxony in the north and the Duchy of Franconia in the south. At the same time, the "Benrath line", which marks a historical linguistic boundary between North Hessian dialect and Westphalian dialects such as the Sauerland Platt, and the dat-das line in this region have a similar course. Small-scale geographic boundaries for the pronunciation of vowels have been proven to Heringhausen into the 20th century. Ecclesiastically the place was subordinate to the Hochstift Paderborn. Landlords were the counts, later princes of Waldeck. With the dissolution of the Free State of Waldeck in 1929 Heringhausen came to the Prussian province of Hesse-Nassau. After 1945, the place first belonged to the American occupation zone and Greater Hesse, then to the state of Hesse.

=== Local history ===
On January 14, 1023, the place is mentioned as Hardinghuson in the goods directories of the monastery Kaufungen documentary as a gift from the Emperor Henry II. of this monastery. The process is documented with the same date with the so-called "imperial certificates" of Henry II. The original diploma of this donation was archived in the State Archives of Münster. [12] The next documentary mention was made in 1043, when the abbot of the monastery Corvey the church of St. Magnus in Horhusen (Niedermarsberg) gave the tithing of the place. The patronage in Heringhausen remained until the introduction of the Reformation in the county of Waldeck in 1526 at the monastery Kaufungen.

Several property and feudal changes (also for parts) are documented for Heringhausen, which ended in 1565 with the transfer of ownership claims to the county Waldeck. From then Heringhausen belonged to the Eisenberg Office, to the Gogericht Flechtdorf and the free-seat Schweinsbühl. The reformation was introduced in the village around 1542 by pastor Johann Pistor and from 1550 by pastor Daniel Dillen (1550 to 1601). The place had in 1738 twenty houses. For the year 1788 an "iron hammer of Pohlmann" is known. In 1822, Johann Gunther Friedrich Cannabich mentions that there are 206 inhabitants in Heringhausen, a powder mill and an "arms hammer". By electoral law of May 23, 1849, the place was assigned by Princess Emma Waldeck and Pyrmont the constituency VIII of the Imperial Principality Waldeck- Pyrmont. Based on the census as of December 1, 1885, the following figures were recorded for the place: 32 residential buildings with 33 households, 113 male and 99 female residents, 211 Protestant and 1 person with a Catholic denomination. To the place 3 housing places were noted: beside the main place Kotthausen with 2 residential buildings and 8 inhabitants as well as Reuemühle with a house and 8 persons were listed.

As part of the Kinderlandverschickung in the Second World War, the inn Giesing KLV camp Ku 023. Children of the elementary schools of Ihringshausen and Sandershausen were housed there in the fall of 1944.

On 31 December 1971, Heringhausen and twelve other previously independent communities formed the new community Diemelsee.

In 2015, the economic union of parishes in the area of Diemelsee was also decided for Heringhausen. In the deed dated November 12, 2015, all properties of the parish are listed in detail. In the document were treated with the positions 24, 25 and 30 real estate of the Protestant church in the district of Heringhausen. This concerned a property of just over 10 hectares, which constituted only a fraction of the medieval church property in the village. Historic place names

== Places of interest ==
In the vicinity of the place are attractions and natural monuments. In the central part of the village they are remarkable:

- Church of Santa Bárbara, Romanesque church from the 10th century.
- "Visionarium Diemelsee", a permanent exhibition on the environment, geography and history with evolving contents.
- "The longest bench in Hessen", a bench of a wooden Douglas tribe 26.42 metres long.
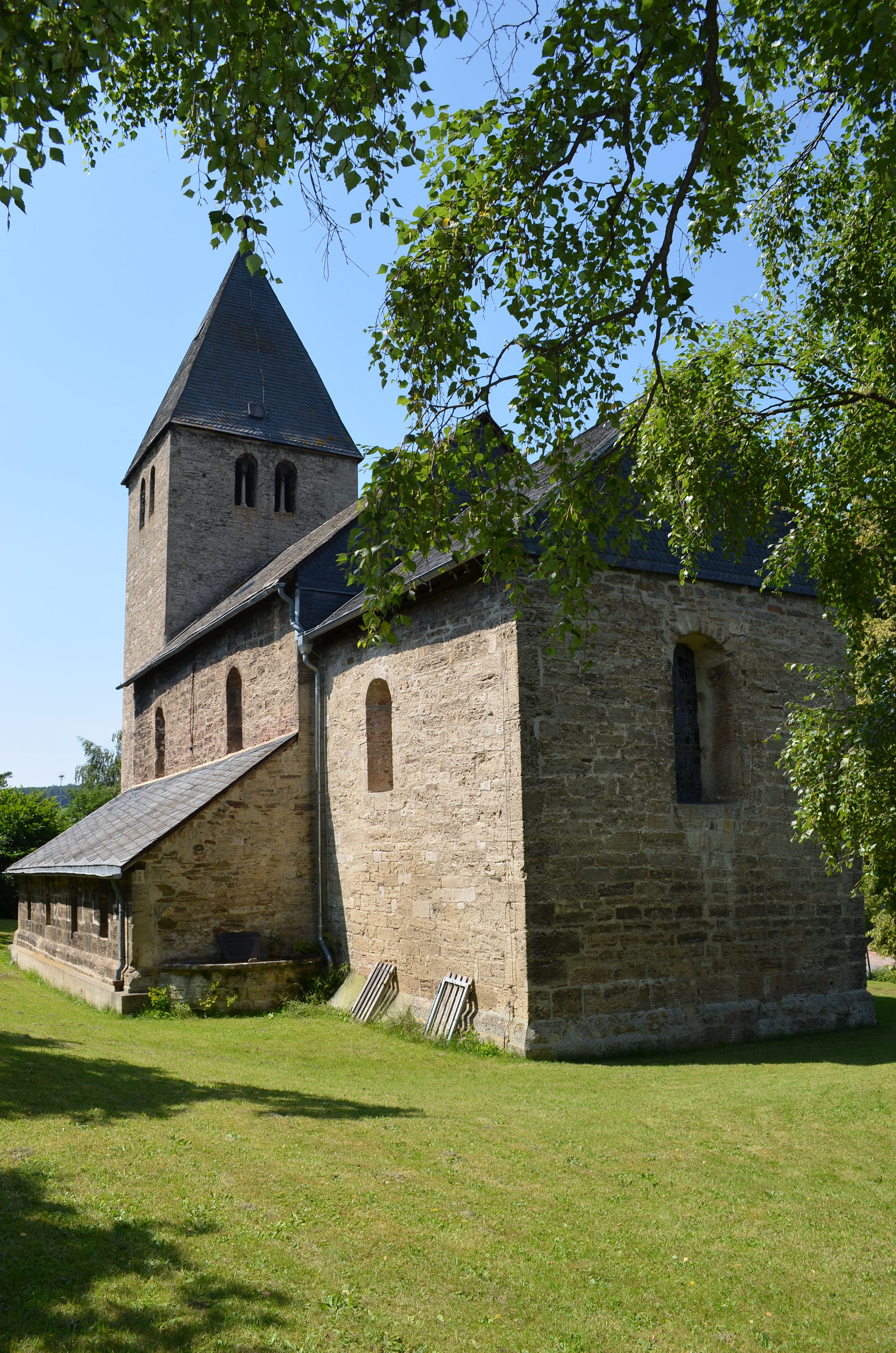
Santa Barbara church

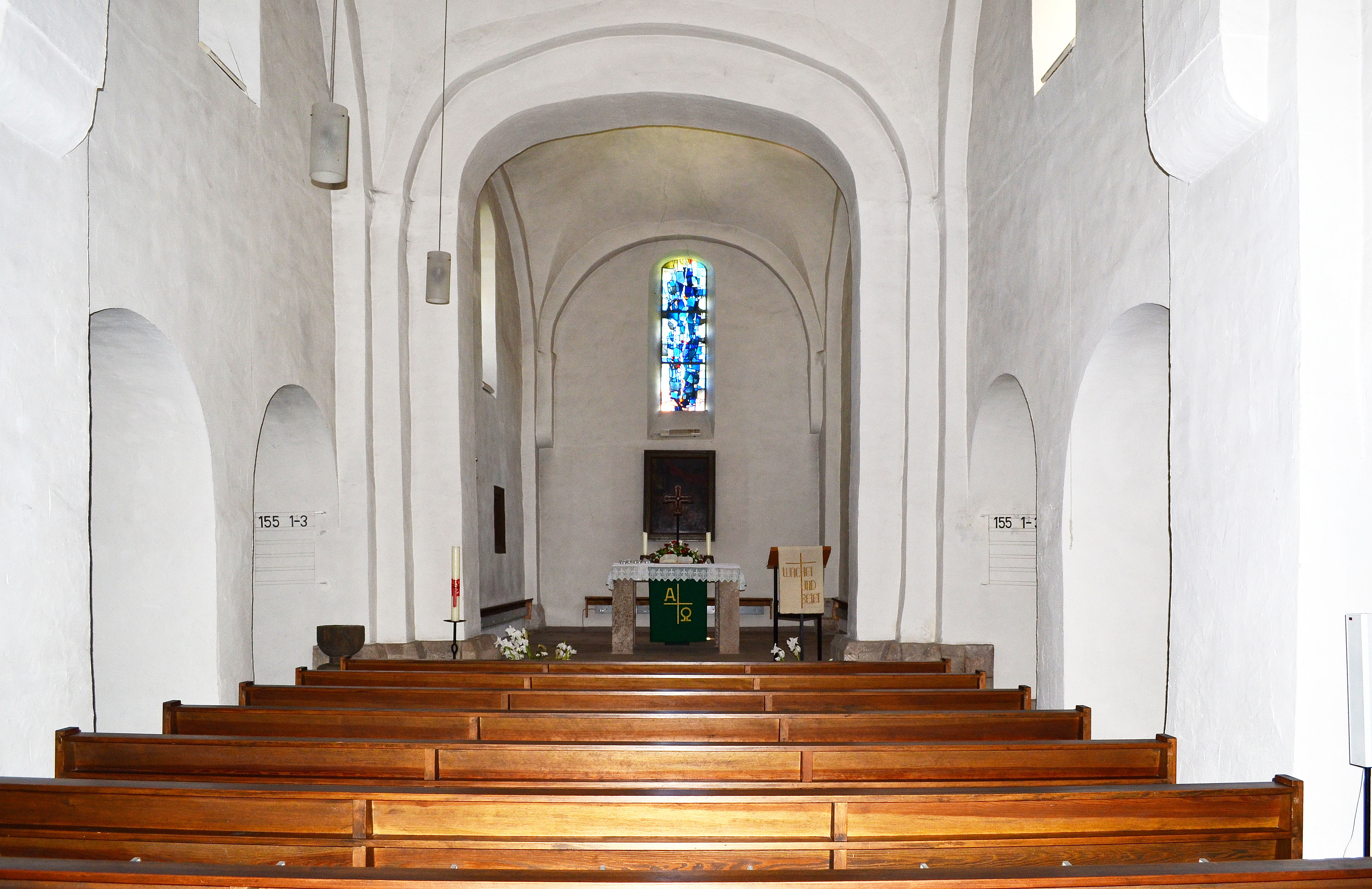
view to the altar

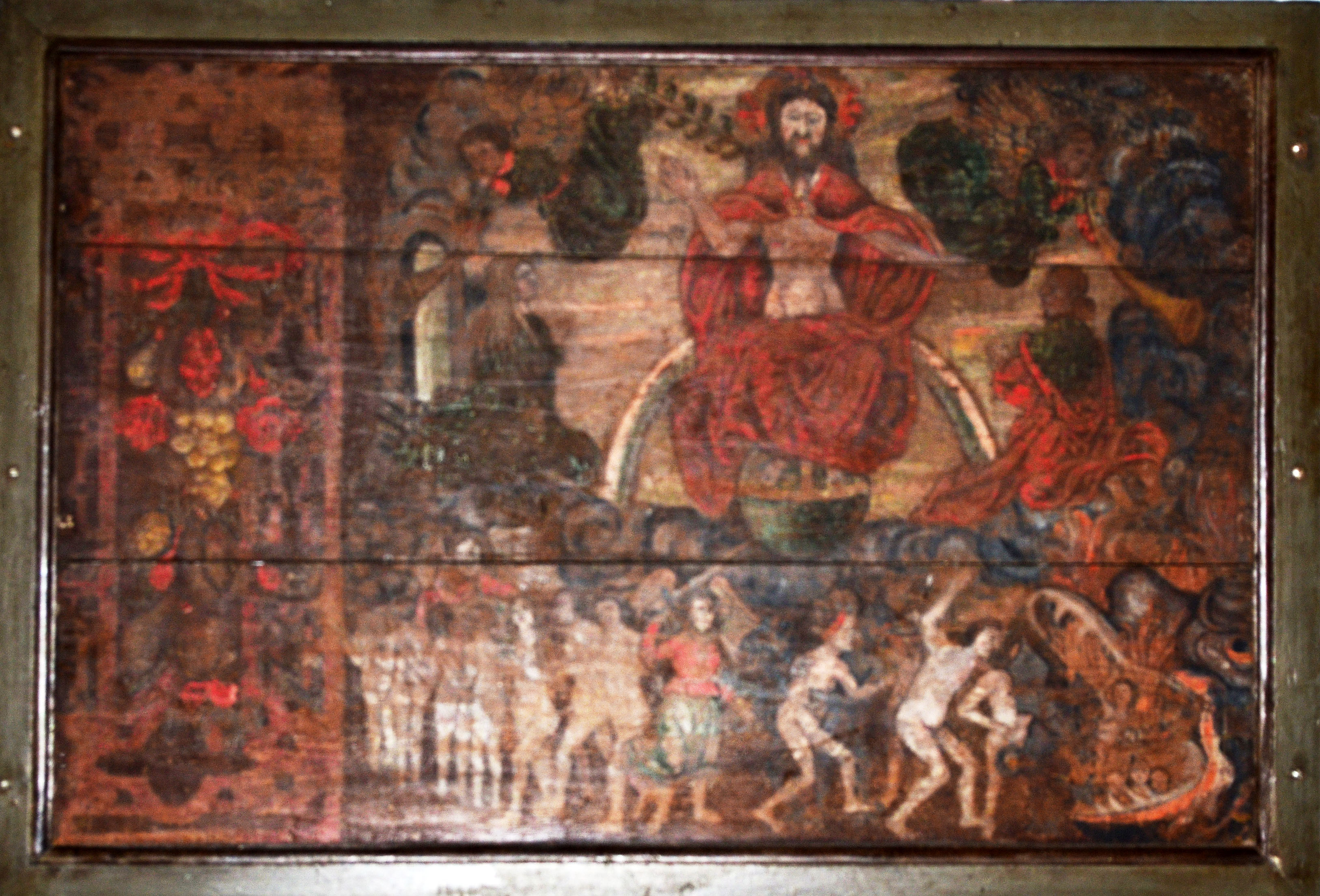
A historic wooden board in the church of Santa Barbara

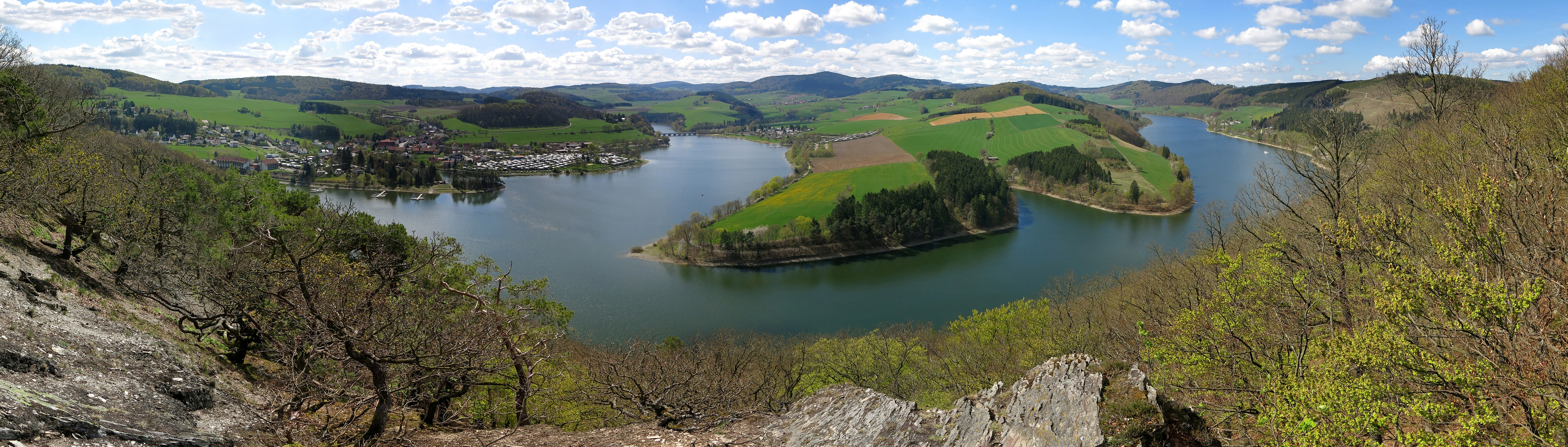
Heringhausen

== See also ==
- Willingen
