= Orenberg (Upland) =

Mountain of Waldeck-Frankenberg, Hesse, Germany

Coordinates: 51°17′31″N 8°37′17″E

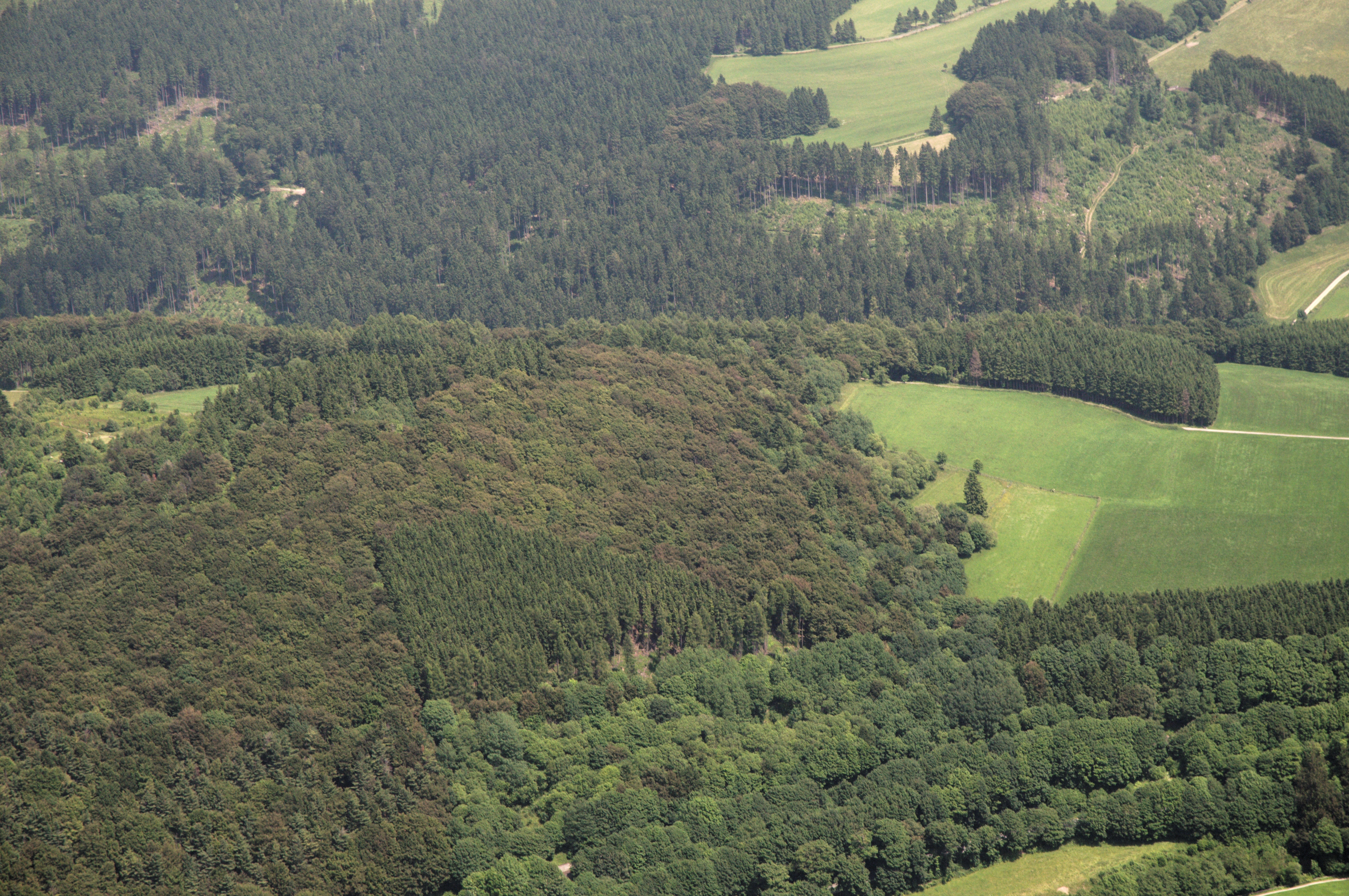

Highest point
- Elevation: 702 m (2,303 ft)

Geography
- Location: Landkreis Waldeck-Frankenberg, Hesse, Germany

Orenberg is a mountain of Landkreis Waldeck-Frankenberg, Hesse, Germany.
