= Karl Schüßler =

German cross-country skier (1924–2023)

Karl Schüßler (19 March 1924 – 7 January 2023) was a West German cross-country skier who competed in the 1950s. He competed in the 50 km event at the 1952 Winter Olympics in Oslo, but did not finish.

Schüßler was born in Willingen on 19 March 1924. He died in Willingen on 7 January 2023, at the age of 98.
