= Holzbach (Diemel) =

River in Germany

Location
- Country: Germany
- States: Hesse

Physical characteristics
- Mouth
  - location: Diemel
  - coordinates: 51.3491°N 8.7235°E

Basin features
- Progression: Diemel→ Weser→ North Sea

Holzbach (German pronunciation: [ˈhɔlt͡sˌbax]) is a small river of Hesse, Germany. It is a left tributary of the Diemel near Giebringhausen.

== See also ==
- List of rivers of Hesse
