= Sähre =

Mountain in Hesse, Germany

Coordinates: 51°18′N 8°40′E

Highest point
- Elevation: 726 m (2,382 ft)

Geography
- Location: Landkreis Waldeck-Frankenberg, Hesse, Germany

Sähre is a mountain of Landkreis Waldeck-Frankenberg, Hesse, Germany.
