= Hopperkopf =

Mountain in Hesse, Germany

Coordinates: 51°14′50″N 8°35′54″E

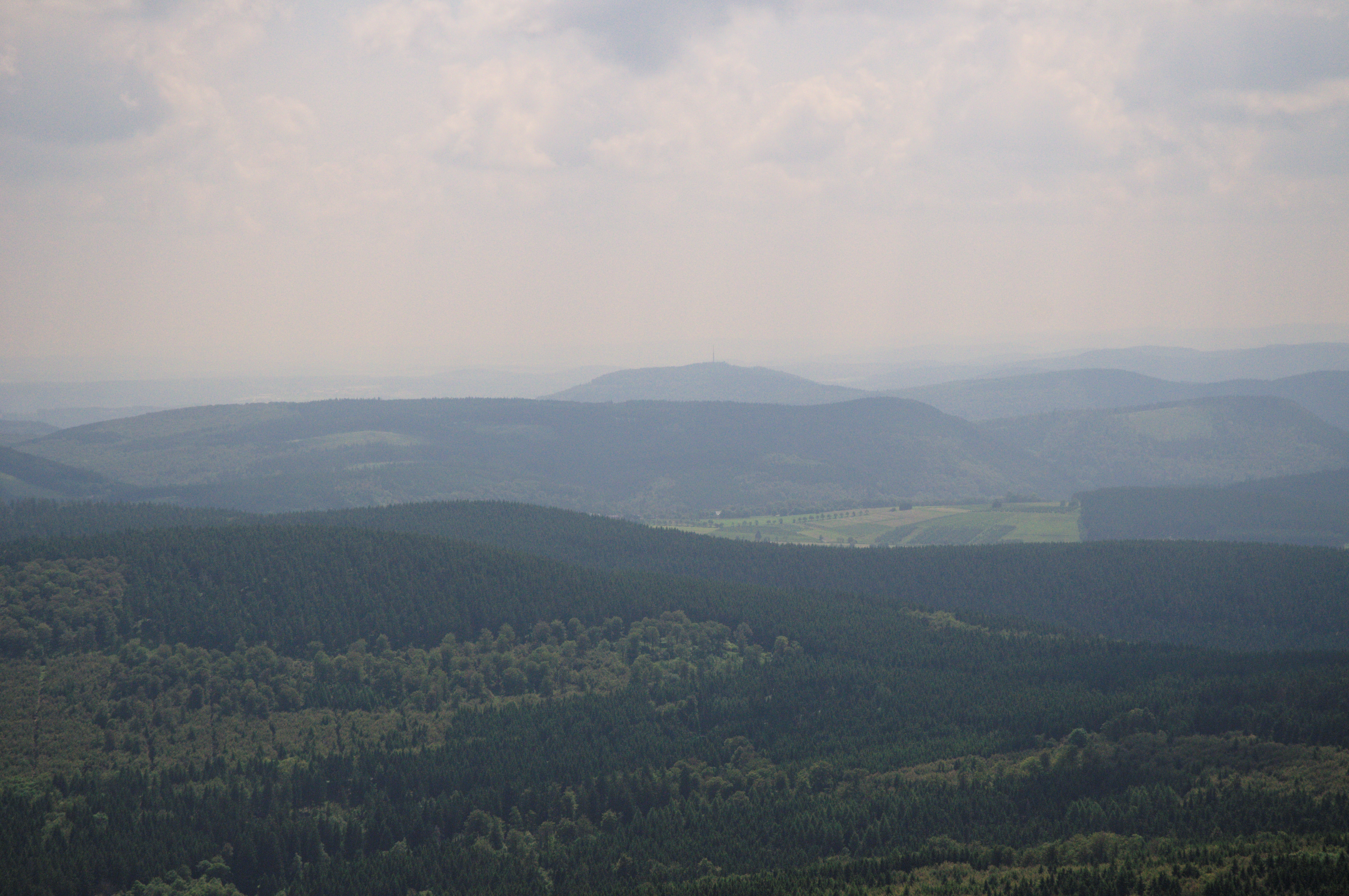

Highest point
- Elevation: 832.3 m (2,731 ft)

Geography
- Location: Landkreis Waldeck-Frankenberg, Hesse, Germany

Hopperkopf is a mountain of Landkreis Waldeck-Frankenberg, Hesse, Germany.
