= Itter (Diemel) =

River in Germany

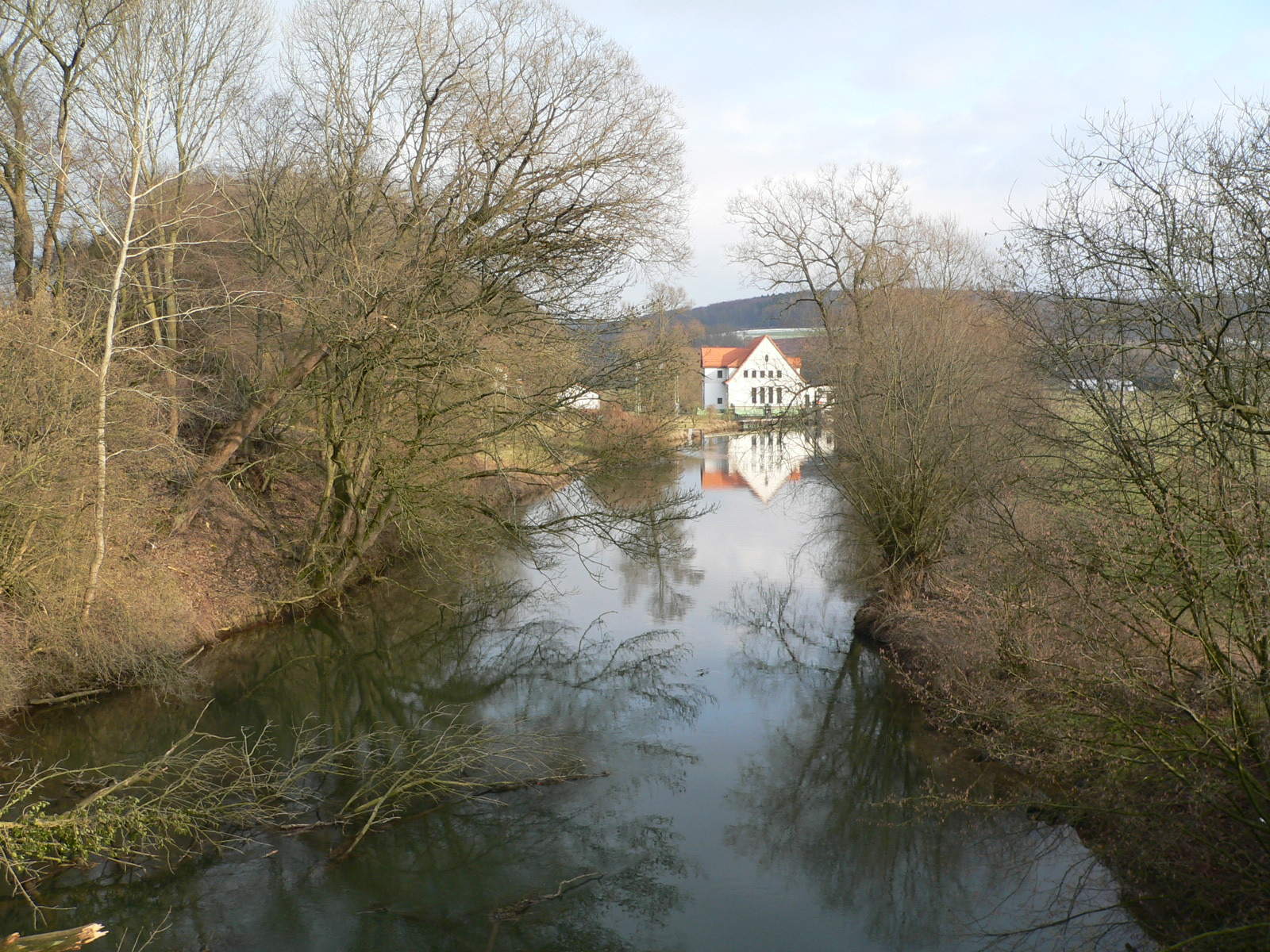

Location
- Country: Germany
- States: Hesse; North Rhine-Westphalia

Physical characteristics
- Mouth
  - location: Diemelsee
  - coordinates: 51°21′59″N 8°41′11″E
- Length: 19.3 km (12.0 mi)

Basin features
- Progression: Diemel→ Weser→ North Sea

The Itter (German pronunciation: [ˈɪtɐ]) is a river of Hesse and of North Rhine-Westphalia, Germany. It is a left tributary of the Diemel in the Waldeck-Frankenberg district in Hesse and in the Hochsauerland district in North Rhine-Westphalia. It flows through Willingen.

== See also ==
- List of rivers of Hesse
- List of rivers of North Rhine-Westphalia
