= Hochheideturm =

Observation tower with artificial climbing wall in Germany

Coordinates: 51°16′43″N 8°35′59″E

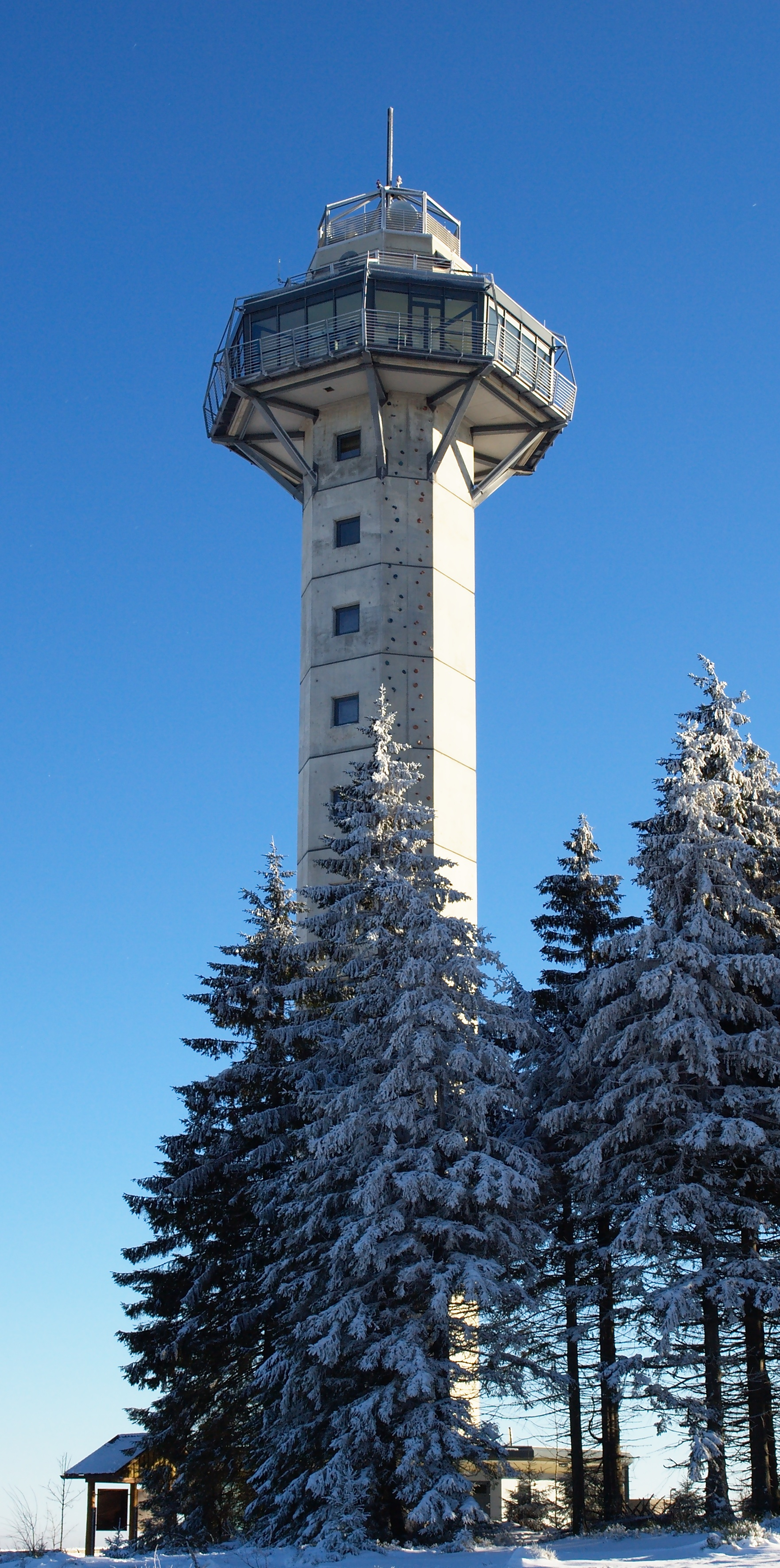

Hochheideturm is a 59-metre-high (194 ft) observation tower, with a completely glassed prospect platform on 831 metres high, located in Ettelsberg, Germany, near Willingen. The northwest side of the tower is the highest artificial climbing wall of Europe (height: 41 metres).

== Construction ==
Hochheideturm was designed by Karl Suck in Korbach and is constructed of reinforced concrete construction with octagonal cross section.

Erection of Hochheideturm, which belongs to Ettelsberg aerial ropeway GmbH & CO. kg, cost 2 million euro and started in November 2001, after construction permit was given on 16 October 2001. On 31 January 2002 its foundation was finished and on 15 April 2002 the above ground construction work. Over the prospect platform there is an engineering floor, in which transmitters for police radio services are installed.

Celebration for the tower was on 16 August 2002, with final the above ground construction work occurring on 27 September 2002. One day later it was already open for the public. The official inauguration took place on 18 October 2002.

== See also ==
- List of towers
