= Mittelsberg =

Mountain in Hesse, Germany

Coordinates: 51°16′34″N 8°35′00″E

Highest point
- Elevation: 801 m (2,628 ft)

Geography
- Location: Landkreis Waldeck-Frankenberg, Hesse, Germany

Mittelsberg is a mountain in Landkreis Waldeck-Frankenberg, Hesse, Germany.
