= Mühlenkopfschanze =

Ski jumping hill in Willingen, Germany

Coordinates: 51°16′30″N 8°36′55″E

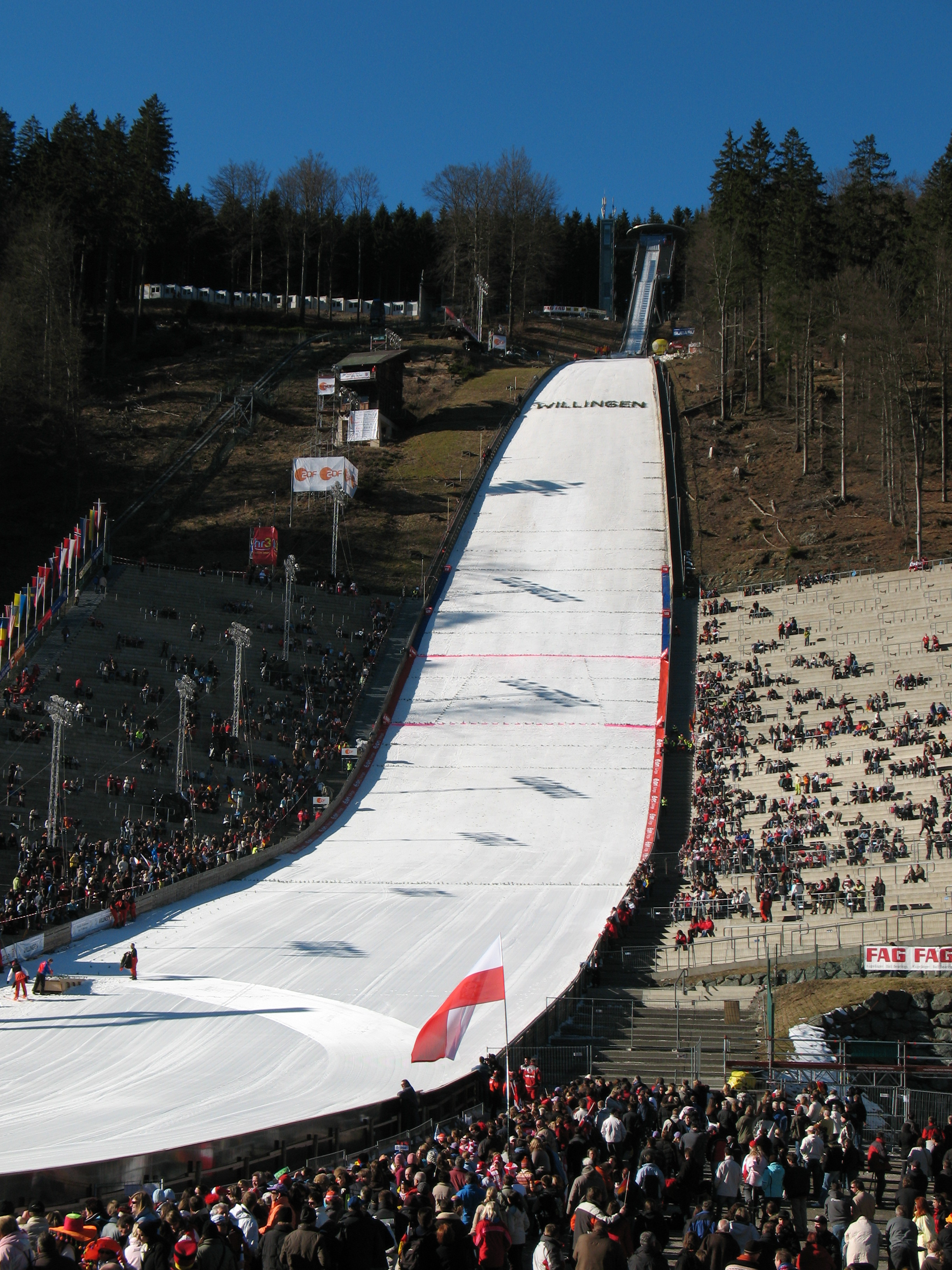
- Location: Willingen, Germany
- Opened: 1951
- Renovated: 2000, 2013

Size
- K–point: K-130
- Hill size: HS147
- Longest jump (unofficial / fall): 161.5 metres (530 ft) (Slovenia) Timi Zajc (3 February 2023)
- Hill record: 155.5 metres (510 ft) (Norway) Johann André Forfang (3 February 2024)

Mühlenkopfschanze is the largest ski jumping hill in the world located in Willingen (Hessen), Germany with a K-point of 130 metres (430 ft) and Hill size of 147 metres (482 ft).

The hill is located on the north-eastern, forested slope of the Mühlenkopf peak (815 m above sea level) in the Rothaar Mountains, from which the facility takes its name and is a regular venue in the FIS Ski jumping World Cup.

== Hill parameters ==
- Construction point: 130 m
- Hill size (HS): 147 m
- Official hill record: 155.5 metres (510 ft) – (Norway) Johann André Forfang (3 February 2024)
- Hill record: 161.5 metres (530 ft) – (Slovenia) Timi Zajc (3 February 2023) – fall
- Inrun length: 100.0 m
- Inrun angle: 35°
- Take-off length: 6.7 m
- Take-off angle: 11°
- Take-off height: 3.25 m
- Landing angle: 35°
- Average speed: 93.6 km/h
- Homologation source:

== History ==
The first ski jumping hill on the Mühlenkopf mountain was built in 1925, and its ceremonial opening took place in 1926. In 1950, it was expanded to the size of a large ski jumping hill with an inrun tower, and the inauguration took place on 14 January 1951. The Mühlenkopfschanze was the fourth largest at that time ski jump in the world.

The first World Cup competition in Willingen took place in the 1994/95 season. Initially, they were held every two years, but for many seasons Willingen has been a permanent fixture in the annual World Cup calendar.

In 2000, the facility underwent a thorough modernization, the old ski jumping hill with wooden starting tower was demolished and a new one was built in its place, where distances over 140 meters were possible. The K-89 normal hill, which was located directly next to the large K-120, on its right side, was closed down. The facility has artificial lighting and the audience capacity is 23,500.

Since the 2017/2018 season, the World Cup competitions in Willingen have been part of the Willingen Five series (in 2021, the name was changed to Willingen Six, when the last edition of the tournament was held). Its winners were, chronologically, Kamil Stoch, Ryōyū Kobayashi, Stephan Leyhe and Halvor Egner Granerud. The main prize in this mini-cycle was 25,000 euros.
