= Twistetal =

- Municipality
- Coat of arms

- Location of Twistetal within Waldeck-Frankenberg district
- Interactive map of Twistetal
- Location within Germany Location within Hesse
- Coordinates: 51°19′N 08°57′E
- Country: Germany
- State: Hesse
- Admin. region: Kassel
- District: Waldeck-Frankenberg

Government
  - Mayor (2018–24): Stefan Dittmann (FDP)

Area
  - Total: 74.08 km^{2} (28.60 sq mi)
- Elevation: 272 m (892 ft)

Population (2025-12-31)
  - Total: 4,167
  - Density: 56.25/km^{2} (145.7/sq mi)
- Time zone: UTC+01:00 (CET)
  - Summer (DST): UTC+02:00 (CEST)
- Postal codes: 34477
- Dialling codes: 05695
- Vehicle registration: KB
- Website: www.twistetal.de

Twistetal (German pronunciation: [ˈtvɪstətaːl], lit. 'Twiste Valley') is a municipality in Waldeck-Frankenberg in northwest Hesse, Germany, southwest of Bad Arolsen.

== Geography ==
=== Location ===
The municipality lies on the river Twiste, a tributary to the Diemel, itself a tributary to the Weser. Twistetal is only a short way downstream from, and southwest of, the Twistesee, a man-made lake. It is located about 6 kilometers southwest from Bad Arolsen.

=== Neighbouring municipalities ===
Twistetal borders in the north and east on the town of Bad Arolsen, in the southeast on the town of Waldeck, in the southwest on the town of Korbach and in the west on the municipality of Diemelsee (all in Waldeck-Frankenberg).

=== Constituent municipalities ===
Twistetal consists of the following centres:

- Berndorf
- Elleringhausen
- Gembeck
- Mühlhausen
- Nieder-Waroldern
- Ober-Waroldern
- Twiste (main town and administrative seat)

== Politics ==
The municipality's mayor is Stefan Dittmann (FDP), elected in 2018. Twistetal's council is made up of 23 councillors, with seats apportioned thus, in accordance with municipal elections held in March 2021:

- CDU 7 seats
- FDP 5 seats
- SPD 4 seats
- Wählergemeinschaft Twistetal 4 seats
- Greens 3 seat

Note: Wählergemeinschaft Twistetal is a citizens' coalition.

== Infrastructure ==
Through Twistetal runs Federal Highway (Bundesstraße) 252 from Korbach to Bad Arolsen. Furthermore, Twiste is a stop on the RegionalExpress railway service from Kassel to Korbach.

== Outing destinations ==
Well known points of interest nearby are the Twistesee and the neighboring historic towns of Bad Arolsen and Korbach.

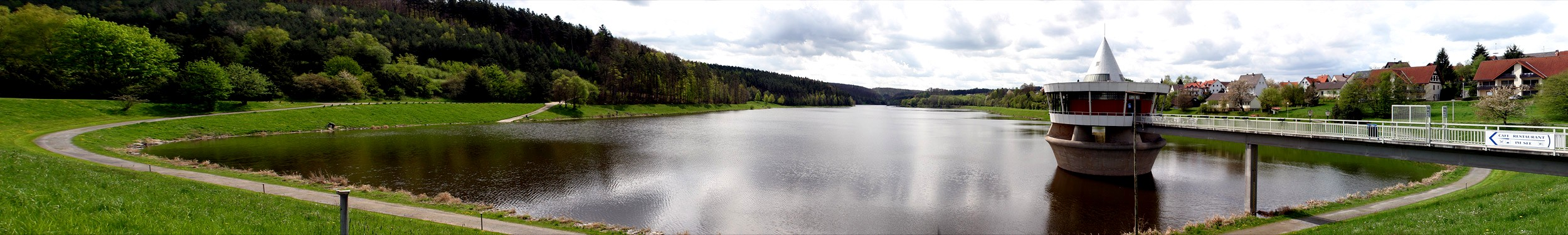
Panorama of Twistesee
