= Kohlenberg (Hesse) =

Mountain in Hesse, Germany

Coordinates: 50°58′00″N 8°35′33″E

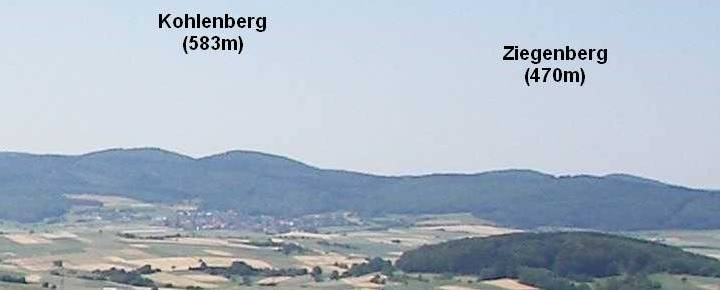

Highest point
- Elevation: 583 m (1,913 ft)

Geography
- Location: Landkreis Waldeck-Frankenberg, Hesse, Germany

The Kohlenberg is a hill in the county of Landkreis Waldeck-Frankenberg, Hesse, Germany.
