= Osterkopf =

Mountain in Waldeck-Frankenberg, Germany

Coordinates: 51°17′21″N 8°40′19″E

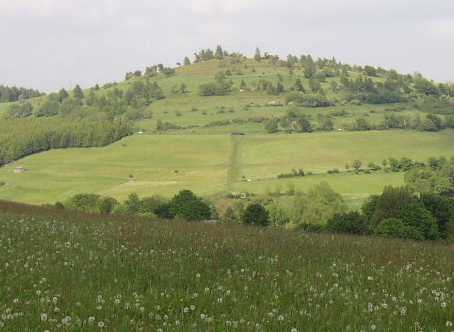

Highest point
- Elevation: 708.5 m (2,324 ft)

Geography
- Location: Landkreis Waldeck-Frankenberg, Hesse, Germany

Osterkopf is a mountain in Landkreis Waldeck-Frankenberg, Hesse, Germany.
