= Hohe Egge (Selter) =

- Location within Lower Saxony

Highest point
- Elevation: 395 m above sea level (NHN) (1,295.9 ft)
- Coordinates: 51°54′18″N 9°53′27″E

Geography
- Location: near Ammensen; counties of Hildesheim, Holzminden and Northeim, Lower Saxony (Germany)
- Parent range: Selter, Weser-Leine Uplands, Lower Saxon Hills

At 395 m above sea level (NHN), the Hohe Egge near Ammensen in the Lower Saxon counties of Hildesheim, Holzminden and Northeim is the highest point on the Selter in the Lower Saxon Hills.

== Geography ==
The Hohe Egge lies roughly southeast of the centre of the elongated ridge of the Selter. Its summit is in the county of Holzminden in the municipality of Delligsen – about 2.4 km (as the crow flies) east-southeast of Ammensen on the upper reaches of the Rheinbach stream. North of the hill lies Freden (Leine) and to the southeast is Erzhausen, in the valley of the Leine. To the south is Naensen and to the southwest, Stroit, which lies along the upper course of the Stroiter Bach. The northern hillside descends towards Freden in the county of Hildesheim. To the southeast, towards Erzhausen, and to the south and southwest, towards Naensen and Stroit, the slopes descend into the county of Norttheim. In a valley section in the southern side of the hill, in the borough of Einbeck, is the farmstead of Weddehagen.

Just under 400 metres northeast of the summit of the Hohe Egge along the crest of the Selter are the crags of the Selterklippen and, about 1 km southeast of the Hohe Egge at a height of 393.1 m is the upper basin of the Erzhausen Pumped Storage Plant.
