= Hegekopf =

Mountain in Hesse, Germany

Coordinates: 51°20′N 8°39′E

Highest point
- Elevation: 842.9 m (2,765 ft)

Geography
- Location: Landkreis Waldeck-Frankenberg, Hesse, Germany

Hegekopf is a mountain of Landkreis Waldeck-Frankenberg, Hesse, Germany.
