= Ettelsberg =

Mountain in Germany

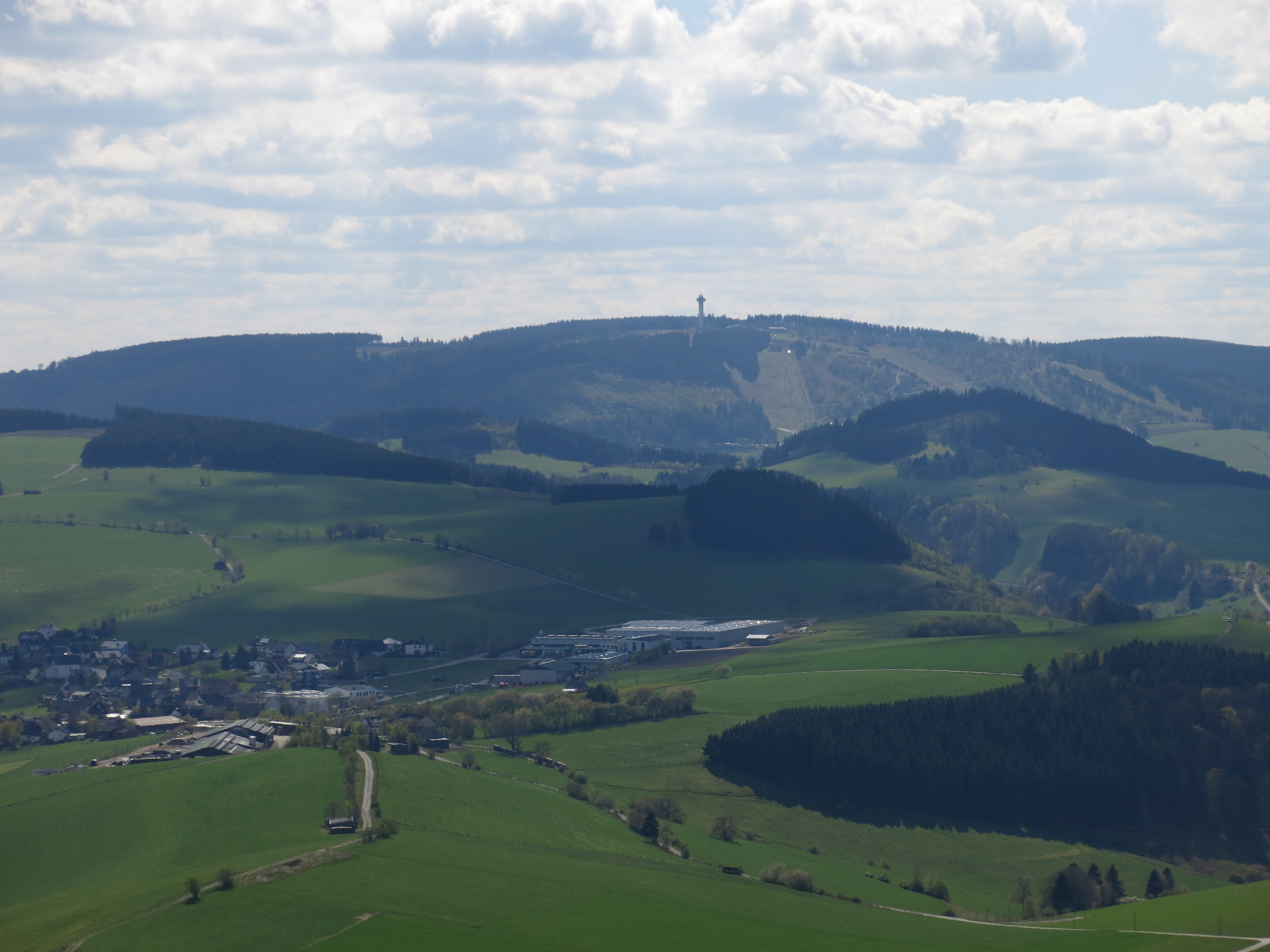
- Ettelsberg

Highest point
- Elevation: 837.7 m (2,748 ft)
- Coordinates: 51°16′40″N 8°35′51″E

Geography
- Location within Germany Location within Hesse
- Location: Waldeck-Frankenberg, Hesse, Germany

Ettelsberg is a mountain of Landkreis Waldeck-Frankenberg, Hesse, Germany.
