= Diemelsee (municipality) =

- Municipality
- Coat of arms

- Location of Diemelsee within Waldeck-Frankenberg district
- Interactive map of Diemelsee
- Location within Germany Location within Hesse
- Coordinates: 51°22′N 08°48′E
- Country: Germany
- State: Hesse
- Admin. region: Kassel
- District: Waldeck-Frankenberg
- Subdivisions: 13 Ortsteile

Government
  - Mayor (2023–29): Volker Becker

Area
  - Total: 121.59 km^{2} (46.95 sq mi)
- Elevation: 388 m (1,273 ft)

Population (2025-12-31)
  - Total: 4,440
  - Density: 36.5/km^{2} (94.6/sq mi)
- Time zone: UTC+01:00 (CET)
  - Summer (DST): UTC+02:00 (CEST)
- Postal codes: 34519
- Dialling codes: 05633
- Vehicle registration: KB
- Website: gemeinde-diemelsee.de

Diemelsee (German pronunciation: [ˈdiːml̩ˌzeː]) is a municipality in Waldeck-Frankenberg in northwest Hesse, Germany, and is part of the low mountain region called Upland. Adorf is the seat of this municipality.

== Geography ==
=== Location ===
Diemelsee lies on the river Diemel in the Diemelsee Nature Park just upstream from and southwest of the Diemelsee reservoir. The town of Korbach is found about 10 km to the southeast, and the town of Paderborn 39 km to the north.

=== Neighbouring municipalities ===
Diemelsee borders in the north on the town of Marsberg (Hochsauerlandkreis in North Rhine-Westphalia), in the northeast on the town of Bad Arolsen, in the east on the municipality of Twistetal, in the south on the town of Korbach, in the southwest on the municipality of Willingen (all in Waldeck-Frankenberg), and in the west on the town of Brilon (Hochsauerlandkreis).

=== Constituent municipalities ===
The municipality of Diemelsee came into being as part of municipal reform in 1971 through the voluntary merger of the following 13 centres:

- Adorf
- Benkhausen
- Deisfeld
- Flechtdorf
- Giebringhausen
- Heringhausen
- Ottlar
- Rhenegge
- Schweinsbühl
- Stormbruch
- Sudeck
- Vasbeck
- Wirmighausen

The municipality's administrative seat is in Adorf, which with a population of 1750 is also the biggest of the 13 centres.

== Politics ==
=== Municipal council ===
	CDU	SPD	FWG	FDP	total
1997	9	13	6	3	31 seats
2001	9	12	6	4	31 seats
2006	9	11	7	4	31 seats

Note: FWG is a citizens' coalition.

The council's 31 seats are apportioned in accordance with municipal elections last held on 26 March 2006. Results for the 1997 and 2001 elections are also shown.

=== Coat of arms ===
Diemelsee's civic coat of arms might heraldically be described thus: Party per bend wavy, above, in Or an eight-pointed star sable, below, in azure a five-petalled rose argent with centre Or and sepals vert.

The black eight-pointed star is the star of Waldeck.

== Culture and sightseeing ==
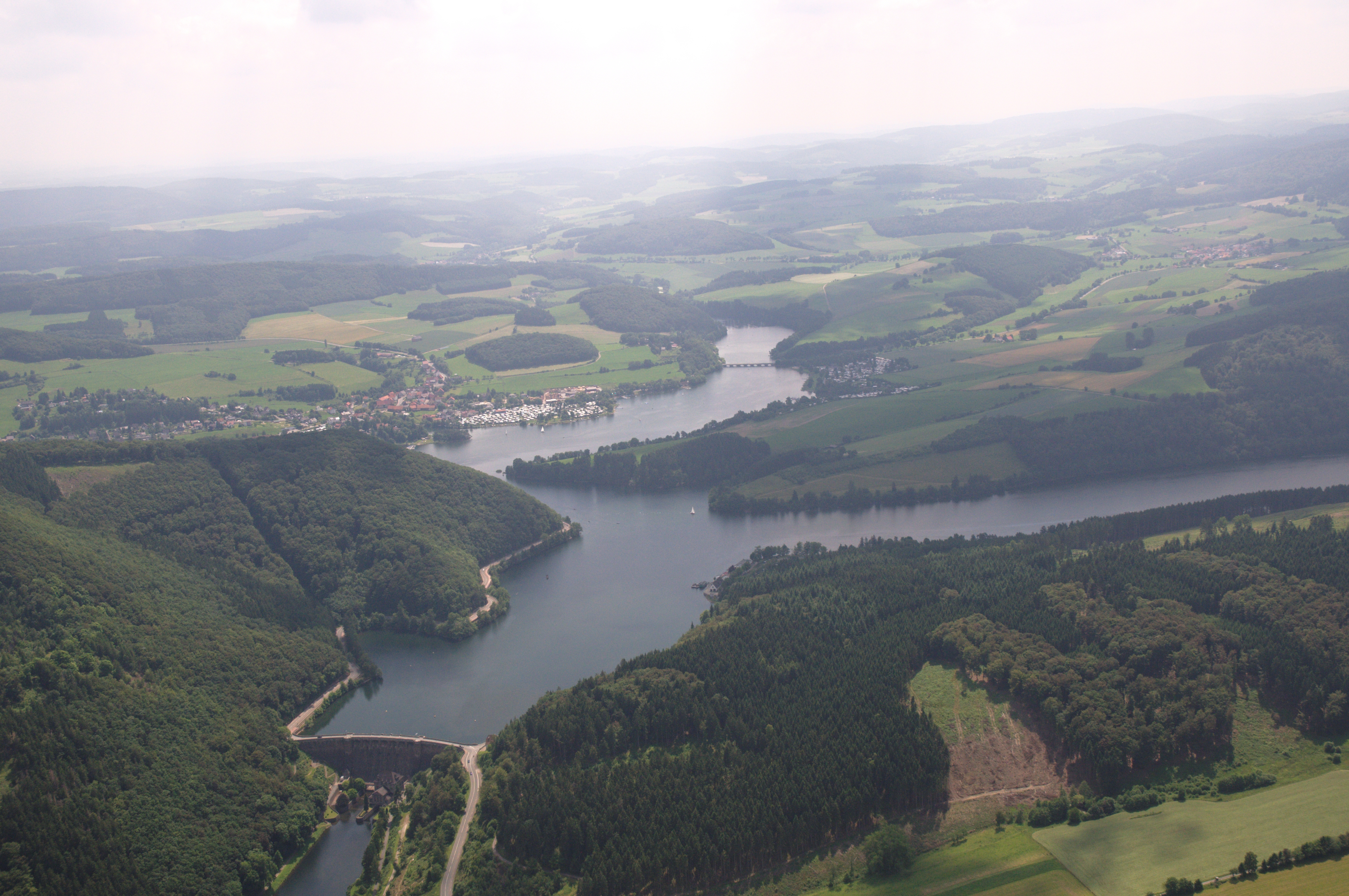
Aerial photo of Diemelsee 2013

=== Outings ===
Well known outing destinations near Diemelsee are the Diemelsee reservoir and the Upland (a German name, pronounced [ˈuː.plant], not as the English word). In Adorf is a visitors' mine, the Grube Christiane.

== Economy and infrastructure ==
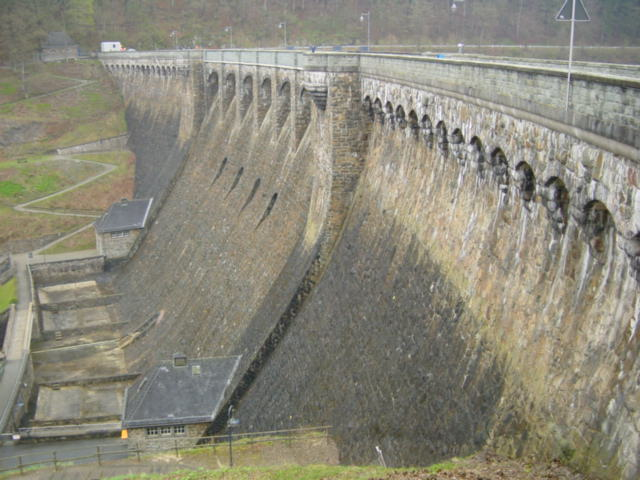
Diemel Dam

The inhabitants earn their livelihood mainly through agriculture, trades, small industry or the tourist trade.
