= Willingen =

- Municipality
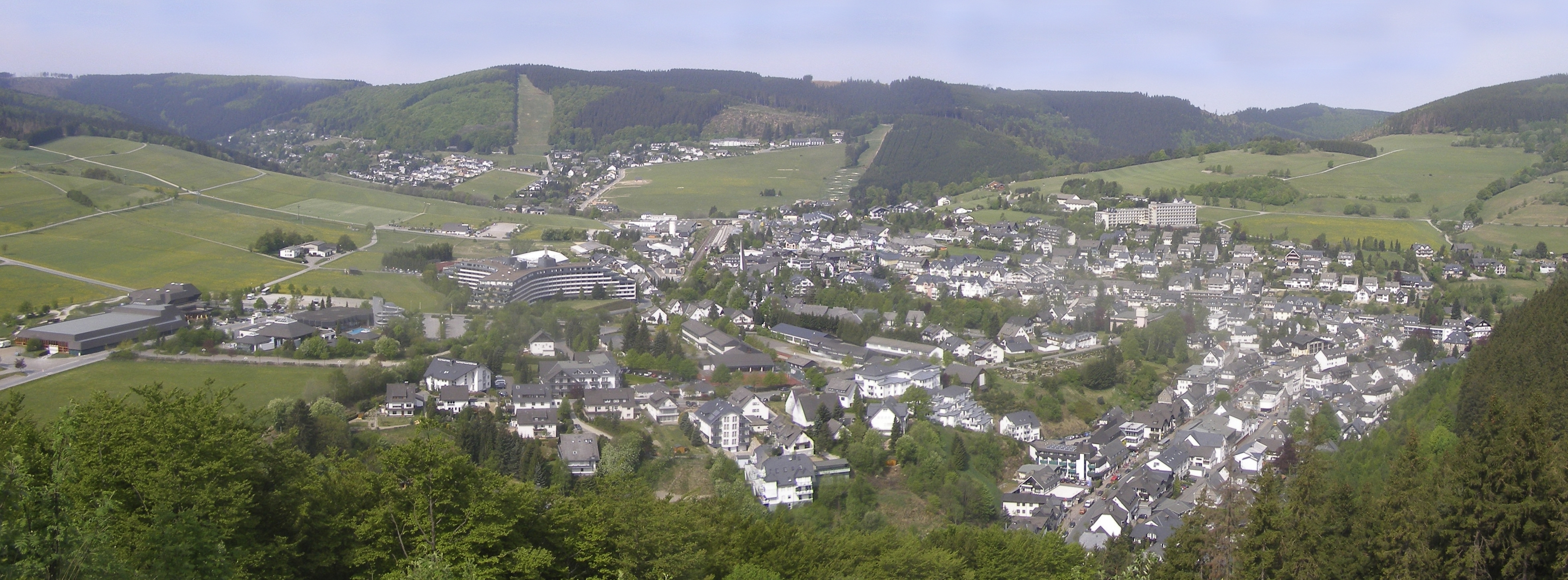
- Panorama of Willingen

- Coat of arms

- Location of Willingen within Waldeck-Frankenberg district
- Interactive map of Willingen
- Location within Germany Location within Hesse
- Coordinates: 51°17′42″N 08°36′29″E
- Country: Germany
- State: Hesse
- Admin. region: Kassel
- District: Waldeck-Frankenberg

Government
  - Mayor (2022–28): Thomas Trachte (Ind.)

Area
  - Total: 80.26 km^{2} (30.99 sq mi)
- Elevation: 584 m (1,916 ft)

Population (2025-12-31)
  - Total: 5,611
  - Density: 69.91/km^{2} (181.1/sq mi)
- Time zone: UTC+01:00 (CET)
  - Summer (DST): UTC+02:00 (CEST)
- Postal codes: 34508
- Dialling codes: 05632
- Vehicle registration: KB
- Website: www.gemeinde-willingen.de

Willingen (German pronunciation: [ˈvɪlɪŋən]; official name: Willingen (Upland)) is a municipality in Waldeck-Frankenberg in northern Hesse, Germany, some 80 km west of Kassel.

== Geography ==
=== Location ===
Willingen is found in Waldeck-Frankenberg district in the Upland. Its main town stretches between two river valleys, the Hoppecke in the west and the Itter in the east. The ski resort Skigebiet Willingen is near. It is located 60 km west of Kassel. Mühlenkopfschanze ski jump is also located here.

=== Neighbouring municipalities ===
Willingen borders in the north on the municipality of Diemelsee, in the east on the town of Korbach, in the south on the municipality of Medebach, and in the west on the towns of Winterberg, Olsberg and Brilon (all three in the Hochsauerlandkreis in North Rhine-Westphalia).

=== Constituent municipalities ===
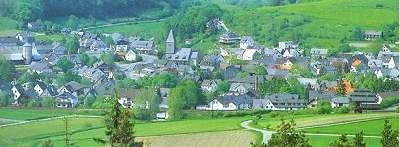
View from the Kahlen Pön (774 m) over Usseln

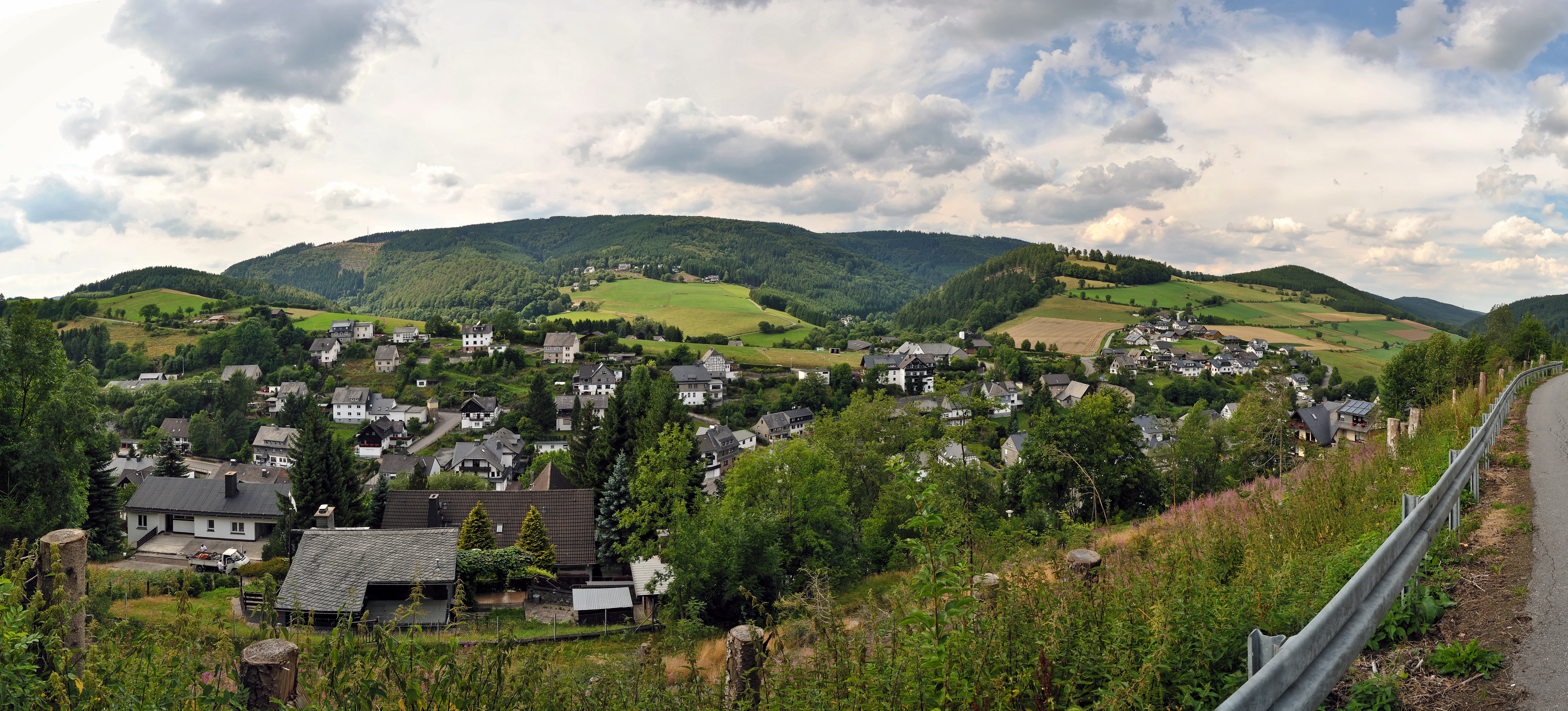
Panoramaview over Schwalefeld

Willingen consists of the following centres:

- Bömighausen, 300 inhabitants (as of 1 September 2003)
- Eimelrod, 582 inhabitants (as of 31 December 2006)
- Hemmighausen, 100 inhabitants
- Neerdar, 100 inhabitants
- Rattlar, 400 inhabitants
- Schwalefeld, 900 inhabitants
- Usseln, 2,100 inhabitants
- Welleringhausen, 100 inhabitants
- Willingen, 3,500 inhabitants

== History ==
Willingen was founded in 1874 in the second municipal reform by uniting the villages of Bömighausen, Eimelrod, Hemmighausen, Neerdar, Rattlar, Schwalefeld, Welleringhausen and the climatic spas of Usseln and Willingen. Until 1929, Willingen belonged to the Free State of Waldeck, after which it passed to Prussia.

== Politics ==
=== Municipal council ===
Willingen's council is made up of 31 councillors, with seats apportioned thus, in accordance with municipal elections held on 6 March 2016:

| CDU | 10 seats |
| SPD | 9 seats |
| FDP | 7 seats |
| FWG | 5 seats |

Note: FWG is a citizens' coalition.

== Coat of arms ==
The field is parted horizontally, below the middle, by a row of interlocking arrows between the gold above and the green below. It is meant, of course, to look like treetops, and refers to the Upland's extensive woods. There are two charges, one inside the other. The eight-pointed black star is the ubiquitous – in terms of the local civic heraldry – Star of Waldeck, borne centuries ago by the Counts of Waldeck when they held sway over the area. The snowflake is included as a charge within the star and is representative of the municipality's status as a winter resort.

The municipality was granted this coat of arms on 12 June 1974.

== Culture and sightseeing ==
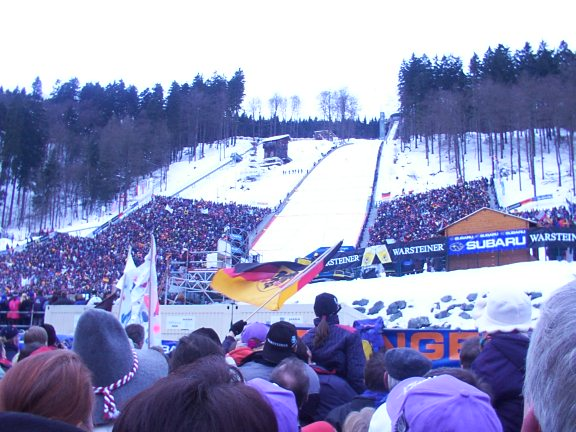
Mühlenkopfschanze at World Cup 2002

Willingen's landmark is the great railway bridge, "Das Viadukt", built about 1918. The municipality thrives mainly on tourism. There were 1.3 million overnight stays in 2003, and attractions include winter sports and bowling clubs.

=== Regular events ===
Among Willingen's sports events are the International Ski Federation's annual FIS Ski Jumping World Cup competition at the Mühlenkopfschanze, and the annual Mountainbike-Event at the Ettelsberg. Nearby lie the trails of Bike Arena Sauerland.

== Transport ==
Willingen lies on the Uplandbahn railway line between Korbach and Brilon-Wald.

== Gallery ==
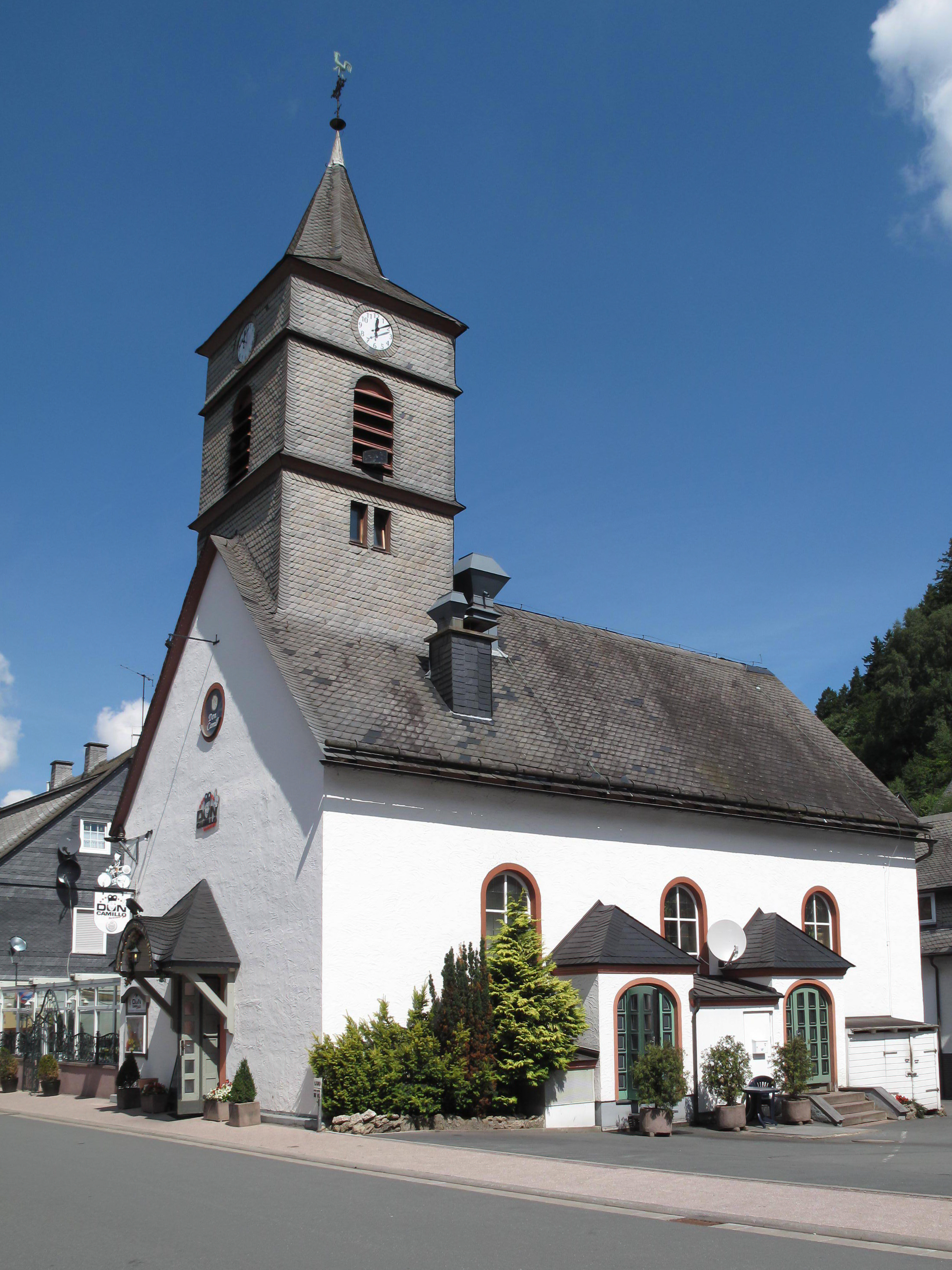
Willingen, bar/restaurant in former church building

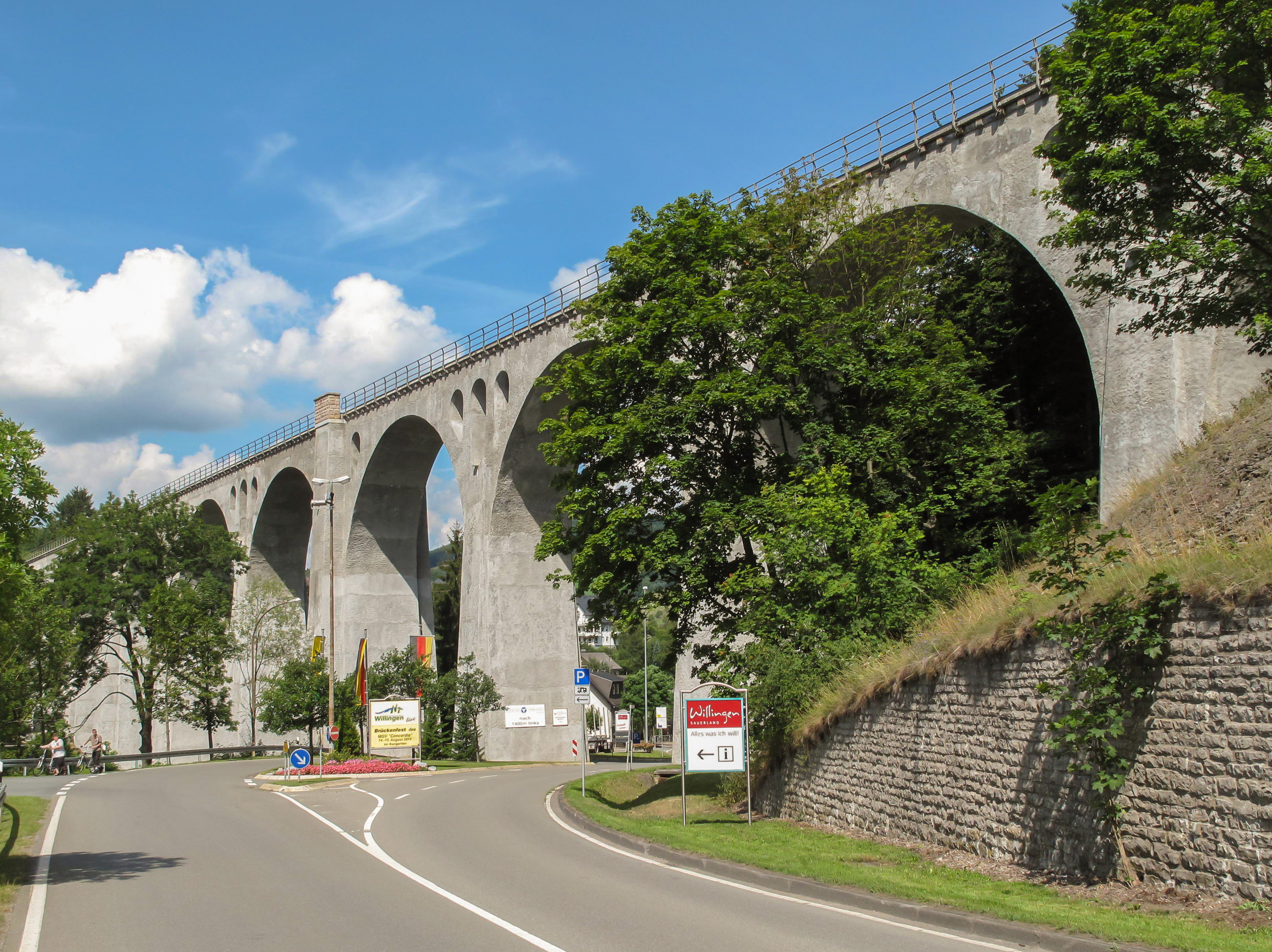
Willingen, viaduct

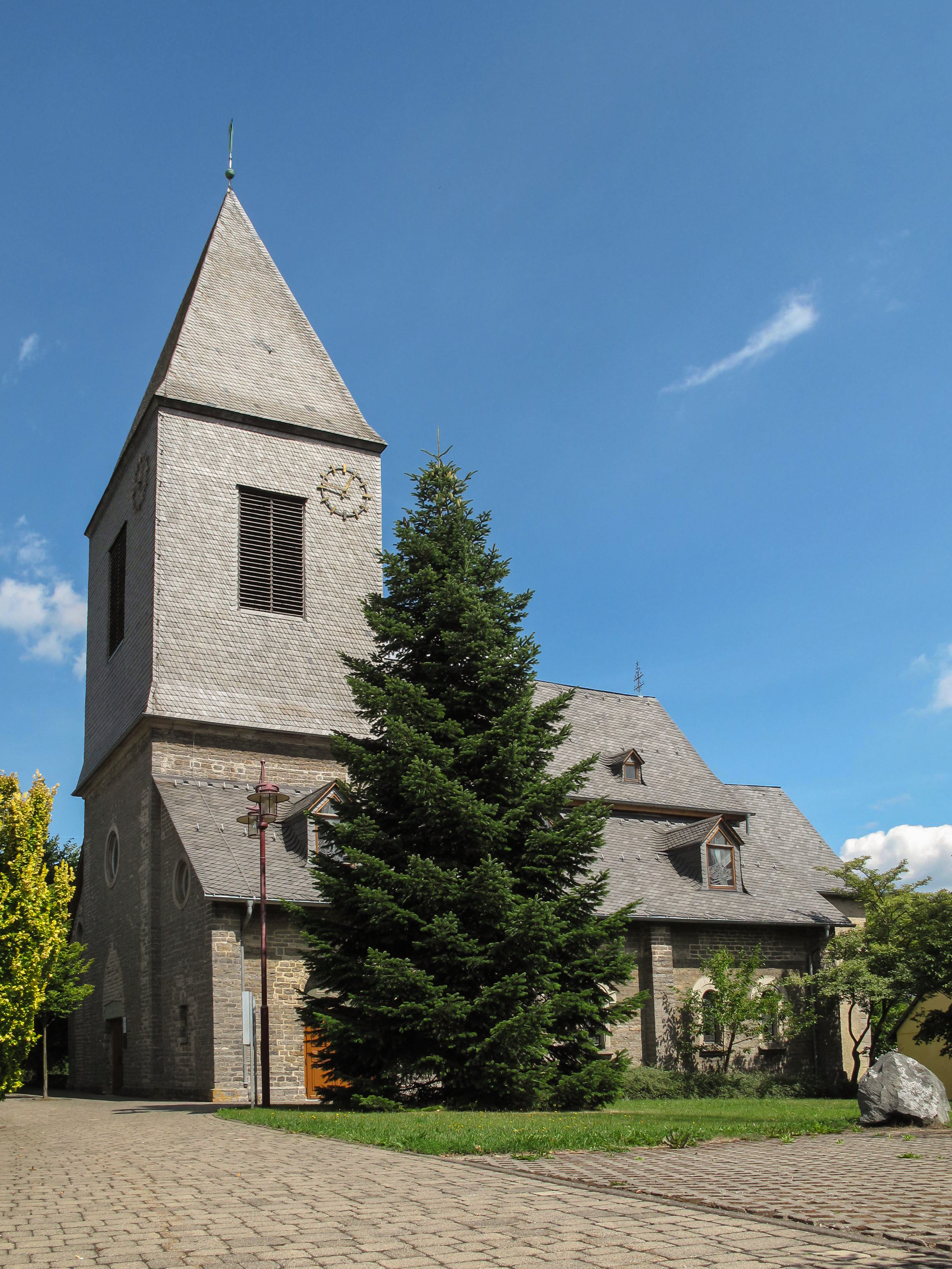
Usseln, church

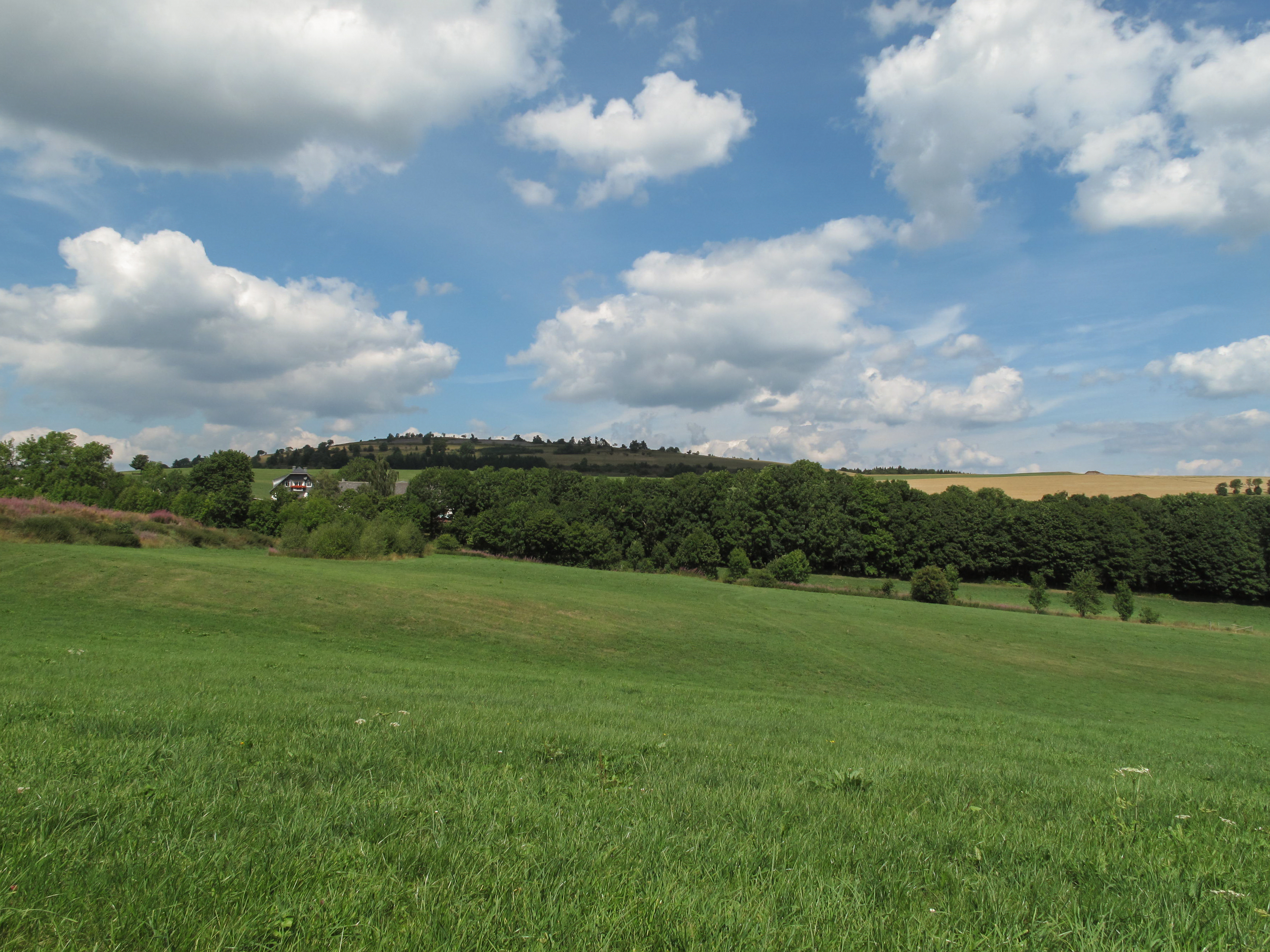
Between Usseln and Düdinghausen, panorama

== Notable people ==
- Heinrich Vogeler (born 1872), architect of Stryckhaus in Willingen
- Karl Schüßler (1924–2023), former cross-country skier, born in Willingen
- Wolfgang Paul (born 1940), former football trainer at SC Willingen
- Jochen Behle (born 1960), former cross-country skier and trainer in the cross-country skiing, lives in the district Schwalefeld and started for the SC Willingen
- Klaus Huber (born 1968), former ski jumping, ski jumping trainer at the SC Willingen
- Inga Schneider (born 1968), former biathlete, born in Willingen
- Petra Behle (born 1969), former biathlete, started for SC Willingen
- Anna Häfele (born 1989), ski jumping champion, started for SC Willingen
- Stephan Leyhe (born 1992), former ski jumper, born in Willingen
- Nadine Horchler (born 1986), former biathlete, started for SC Willingen

== See also ==
- Heringhausen (Diemelsee)
