= Waldeck-Frankenberg =

Coordinates: 51°16′09″N 8°51′24″E

- District
- Flag Coat of arms
- Country: Germany
- State: Hesse
- Adm. region: Kassel
- Founded: 1974-01-01
- Capital: Korbach

Government
  - District admin.: Jürgen van der Horst

Area
  - Total: 1,848.58 km^{2} (713.74 sq mi)

Population (31 December 2022)
  - Total: 159,154
  - Density: 86/km^{2} (220/sq mi)
- Time zone: UTC+01:00 (CET)
  - Summer (DST): UTC+02:00 (CEST)
- Vehicle registration: KB, FK, WA
- Website: landkreis-waldeck-frankenberg.de

Waldeck-Frankenberg is a Kreis (district) in the north of Hesse, Germany. Neighbouring districts are Höxter, Kassel, Schwalm-Eder, Marburg-Biedenkopf, Siegen-Wittgenstein, Hochsauerland.

== History ==
The district was created in 1972 by merging the two districts of Frankenberg and Waldeck. Much of the area of the district had previously been part of the Free State of Waldeck until 1929, and its predecessor the Principality of Waldeck and Pyrmont before 1918.

== Geography ==
The district is located in the mountains of the Sauerland, with the highest elevation in the district of 843 m (2,766 ft). With 1,848.58 km^{2} (713.74 sq mi), it's the largest district in Hessen.

Four artificial lakes created by dams are in the district, the biggest is the Edersee, which covers an area of 12 km^{2} (4.6 sq mi). The Eder is also the main river in the district; the Diemel in the north is a smaller river.

=== Mountains ===
- Osterkopf
- Sähre

=== Hills ===
- Kohlenberg

== Coat of arms ==
Blason
“Per bend sinister Azure a lion rampant issuant per fess Argent and Gules and Or a star with eight rays Sable.”

The coat of arms shows the lion of Hesse in chief. The eight-fold star in base is taken from the coat of arms of the counts and princes of Waldeck, and was also the coat of arms of the former district of Waldeck.

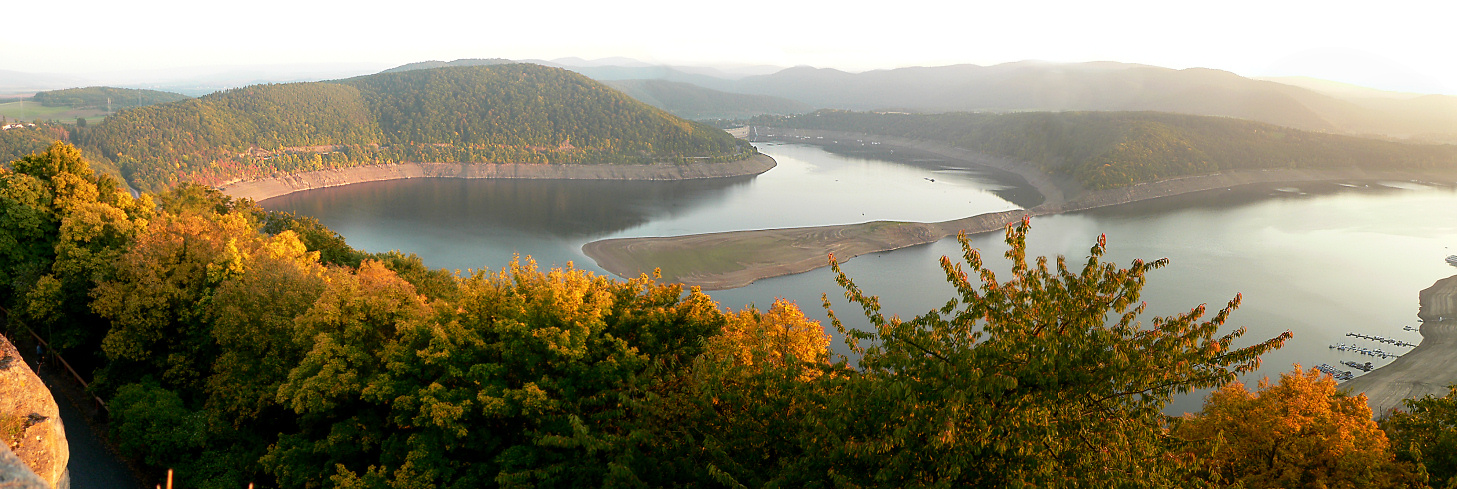
The Edersee with low water level

== Towns and municipalities ==
Clickable map of towns and municipalities in the district

- Towns
  - Bad Arolsen
  - Bad Wildungen
  - Battenberg (Eder)
  - Diemelstadt
  - Frankenau
  - Frankenberg (Eder)
  - Gemünden (Wohra)
  - Hatzfeld (Eder)
  - Korbach
  - Lichtenfels
  - Rosenthal
  - Volkmarsen
  - Waldeck
- Municipalities
  - Allendorf (Eder)
  - Burgwald
  - Diemelsee
  - Edertal
  - Haina (Kloster)
  - Twistetal
  - Vöhl
  - Willingen (Upland)
