= Schwalm-Eder =

Federal electoral district of Germany

169 Schwalm-Eder
- Electoral district for the Bundestag
- Schwalm-Eder in 2025
- State: Hesse
- Population: 235,900 (2019)
- Electorate: 185,944 (2021)
- Major settlements: Schwalmstadt; Frankenberg; Fritzlar
- Area: 2,263.0 km^{2}

Current electoral district
- Created: 1949
- Member: Vacant
- Elected: 2025

Schwalm-Eder is an electoral constituency (German: Wahlkreis) represented in the Bundestag. It elects one member via first-past-the-post voting. Under the current constituency numbering system, it is designated as constituency 169. It is located in northern Hesse, comprising the Schwalm-Eder-Kreis district and the southern part of the Waldeck-Frankenberg district.

Schwalm-Eder was created for the inaugural 1949 federal election. From 2009 to 2025, it was represented by Edgar Franke of the Social Democratic Party (SPD).

== Geography ==
Schwalm-Eder is located in northern Hesse. As of the 2021 federal election, it comprises the entirety of the Schwalm-Eder-Kreis district and the municipalities of Allendorf (Eder), Battenberg (Eder), Bromskirchen, Burgwald, Frankenau, Frankenberg, Gemünden (Wohra), Haina, Hatzfeld, Rosenthal, and Vöhl from the Waldeck-Frankenberg district.

== History ==
Schwalm-Eder was created in 1949, then known as Fritzlar-Homberg. In the 1976 election, it was named Fritzlar. It acquired its current name in the 1980 election. In the 1949 election, it was Hesse constituency 4 in the numbering system. In the 1953 through 1976 elections, it was number 129. From 1980 through 1998, it was number 127. In 2002 and 2005, it was number 172. In the 2009 election, it was number 171. In the 2013 through 2021 elections, it was number 170. From the 2025 election, it has been number 169.

Originally, the constituency comprised the districts of Frankenberg, Fritzlar-Homberg, and Ziegenhain. In the 1965 and 1969 elections, it also contained the municipality of Schiffelbach from the Landkreis Marburg district. In the 1972 election, it comprised the districts of Frankenberg and Fritzlar-Homberg, the municipality of Breitenbach am Herzberg from the Hersfeld-Rotenburg district, the municipality of Schiffelbach from the Landkreis Marburg district, and the Ortsteile of Berfa, Hattendorf, and Lingelbach in Alsfeld municipality from the Vogelsbergkreis district. In the 1976 election, it acquired borders similar to its current configuration, but excluding the municipalities of Felsberg, Guxhagen, Körle, Malsfeld, Melsungen, Morschen, and Spangenberg from Schwalm-Eder-Kreis. It acquired its current borders in the 2002 election.

Election	No.	Name	Borders
1949	4	Fritzlar-Homberg	Frankenberg district; Fritzlar-Homberg district; Ziegenhain district
1953	129	Fritzlar-Homberg	Frankenberg district; Fritzlar-Homberg district; Ziegenhain district
1957	129	Fritzlar-Homberg	Frankenberg district; Fritzlar-Homberg district; Ziegenhain district
1961	129	Fritzlar-Homberg	Frankenberg district; Fritzlar-Homberg district; Ziegenhain district
1965	129	Fritzlar-Homberg	Frankenberg district; Fritzlar-Homberg district; Ziegenhain district; Landkreis Marburg district (only Schiffelbach municipality)
1969	129	Fritzlar-Homberg	Frankenberg district; Fritzlar-Homberg district; Ziegenhain district; Landkreis Marburg district (only Schiffelbach municipality)
1972	129	Fritzlar-Homberg	Waldeck district; Frankenberg district; Fritzlar-Homberg district; Hersfeld-Rotenburg district (only Breitenbach am Herzberg municipality); Landkreis Marburg district (only Schiffelbach municipality); Vogelsbergkreis district (only Alsfeld municipality (only Berfa, Hattendorf, and Lingelbach Ortsteile))
1976	129	Fritzlar	Schwalm-Eder-Kreis district (excluding Felsberg, Guxhagen, Körle, Malsfeld, Melsungen, Morschen, and Spangenberg municipalities); Waldeck-Frankenberg district (only Allendorf (Eder), Battenberg (Eder), Bromskirchen, Burgwald, Frankenau, Frankenberg (Eder), Gemünden (Wohra), Haina (Kloster), Hatzfeld (Eder), Rosenthal, and Vöhl municipalities)
1980	127	Schwalm-Eder	Schwalm-Eder-Kreis district (excluding Felsberg, Guxhagen, Körle, Malsfeld, Melsungen, Morschen, and Spangenberg municipalities); Waldeck-Frankenberg district (only Allendorf (Eder), Battenberg (Eder), Bromskirchen, Burgwald, Frankenau, Frankenberg (Eder), Gemünden (Wohra), Haina (Kloster), Hatzfeld (Eder), Rosenthal, and Vöhl municipalities)
1983	127	Schwalm-Eder	Schwalm-Eder-Kreis district (excluding Felsberg, Guxhagen, Körle, Malsfeld, Melsungen, Morschen, and Spangenberg municipalities); Waldeck-Frankenberg district (only Allendorf (Eder), Battenberg (Eder), Bromskirchen, Burgwald, Frankenau, Frankenberg (Eder), Gemünden (Wohra), Haina (Kloster), Hatzfeld (Eder), Rosenthal, and Vöhl municipalities)
1987	127	Schwalm-Eder	Schwalm-Eder-Kreis district (excluding Felsberg, Guxhagen, Körle, Malsfeld, Melsungen, Morschen, and Spangenberg municipalities); Waldeck-Frankenberg district (only Allendorf (Eder), Battenberg (Eder), Bromskirchen, Burgwald, Frankenau, Frankenberg (Eder), Gemünden (Wohra), Haina (Kloster), Hatzfeld (Eder), Rosenthal, and Vöhl municipalities)
1990	127	Schwalm-Eder	Schwalm-Eder-Kreis district (excluding Felsberg, Guxhagen, Körle, Malsfeld, Melsungen, Morschen, and Spangenberg municipalities); Waldeck-Frankenberg district (only Allendorf (Eder), Battenberg (Eder), Bromskirchen, Burgwald, Frankenau, Frankenberg (Eder), Gemünden (Wohra), Haina (Kloster), Hatzfeld (Eder), Rosenthal, and Vöhl municipalities)
1994	127	Schwalm-Eder	Schwalm-Eder-Kreis district (excluding Felsberg, Guxhagen, Körle, Malsfeld, Melsungen, Morschen, and Spangenberg municipalities); Waldeck-Frankenberg district (only Allendorf (Eder), Battenberg (Eder), Bromskirchen, Burgwald, Frankenau, Frankenberg (Eder), Gemünden (Wohra), Haina (Kloster), Hatzfeld (Eder), Rosenthal, and Vöhl municipalities)
1998	127	Schwalm-Eder	Schwalm-Eder-Kreis district (excluding Felsberg, Guxhagen, Körle, Malsfeld, Melsungen, Morschen, and Spangenberg municipalities); Waldeck-Frankenberg district (only Allendorf (Eder), Battenberg (Eder), Bromskirchen, Burgwald, Frankenau, Frankenberg (Eder), Gemünden (Wohra), Haina (Kloster), Hatzfeld (Eder), Rosenthal, and Vöhl municipalities)
2002	172	Schwalm-Eder	Schwalm-Eder-Kreis district; Waldeck-Frankenberg district (only Allendorf (Eder), Battenberg (Eder), Bromskirchen, Burgwald, Frankenau, Frankenberg (Eder), Gemünden (Wohra), Haina (Kloster), Hatzfeld (Eder), Rosenthal, and Vöhl municipalities)
2005	172	Schwalm-Eder	Schwalm-Eder-Kreis district; Waldeck-Frankenberg district (only Allendorf (Eder), Battenberg (Eder), Bromskirchen, Burgwald, Frankenau, Frankenberg (Eder), Gemünden (Wohra), Haina (Kloster), Hatzfeld (Eder), Rosenthal, and Vöhl municipalities)
2009	171	Schwalm-Eder	Schwalm-Eder-Kreis district; Waldeck-Frankenberg district (only Allendorf (Eder), Battenberg (Eder), Bromskirchen, Burgwald, Frankenau, Frankenberg (Eder), Gemünden (Wohra), Haina (Kloster), Hatzfeld (Eder), Rosenthal, and Vöhl municipalities)
2013	170	Schwalm-Eder	Schwalm-Eder-Kreis district; Waldeck-Frankenberg district (only Allendorf (Eder), Battenberg (Eder), Bromskirchen, Burgwald, Frankenau, Frankenberg (Eder), Gemünden (Wohra), Haina (Kloster), Hatzfeld (Eder), Rosenthal, and Vöhl municipalities)
2017	170	Schwalm-Eder	Schwalm-Eder-Kreis district; Waldeck-Frankenberg district (only Allendorf (Eder), Battenberg (Eder), Bromskirchen, Burgwald, Frankenau, Frankenberg (Eder), Gemünden (Wohra), Haina (Kloster), Hatzfeld (Eder), Rosenthal, and Vöhl municipalities)
2021	170	Schwalm-Eder	Schwalm-Eder-Kreis district; Waldeck-Frankenberg district (only Allendorf (Eder), Battenberg (Eder), Bromskirchen, Burgwald, Frankenau, Frankenberg (Eder), Gemünden (Wohra), Haina (Kloster), Hatzfeld (Eder), Rosenthal, and Vöhl municipalities)
2025	169	Schwalm-Eder	Schwalm-Eder-Kreis district; Waldeck-Frankenberg district (only Allendorf (Eder), Battenberg (Eder), Bromskirchen, Burgwald, Frankenau, Frankenberg (Eder), Gemünden (Wohra), Haina (Kloster), Hatzfeld (Eder), Rosenthal, and Vöhl municipalities)

== Members ==
The constituency has been held by the Social Democratic Party (SPD) during all but three Bundestag terms since its creation. It was first represented by August-Martin Euler of the Free Democratic Party (FDP) from 1949 to 1957, followed by Kurt Wittmer-Eigenbrodt of the Christian Democratic Union (CDU) until 1961. Harri Bading of the SPD was elected in 1961 and served two terms. He was succeeded by Heinz Kreutzmann, who served from 1969 to 1983. Albert Pfuhl was then representative from 1983 to 1994, followed by Gerd Höfer until 2009. Edgar Franke was elected in 2009, and re-elected in 2013, 2017, and 2021.

Election	Member	Party	%
1949	August-Martin Euler	FDP	35.5
1953	August-Martin Euler	FDP	42.8
1957	Kurt Wittmer-Eigenbrodt	CDU	37.6
1961	Harri Bading	SPD	42.6
1965	Harri Bading	SPD	45.7
1969	Heinz Kreutzmann	SPD	48.9
1972	Heinz Kreutzmann	SPD	54.0
1976	Heinz Kreutzmann	SPD	50.5
1980	Heinz Kreutzmann	SPD	52.2
1983	Albert Pfuhl	SPD	48.1
1987	Albert Pfuhl	SPD	49.3
1990	Albert Pfuhl	SPD	47.8
1994	Gerd Höfer	SPD	48.1
1998	Gerd Höfer	SPD	52.3
2002	Gerd Höfer	SPD	52.3
2005	Gerd Höfer	SPD	50.1
2009	Edgar Franke	SPD	40.3
2013	Edgar Franke	SPD	42.3
2017	Edgar Franke	SPD	37.7
2021	Edgar Franke	SPD	39.3
2025	Vacant (Note: Anna-Marie Bischof (CDU) won with 30.1% but seat remained vacant due to insufficient second votes cover.)		

== Election results ==
=== 2025 election ===
Federal election (2025): Schwalm-Eder
Notes:	Blue background denotes the winner of the electorate vote. Pink background denotes a candidate elected from their party list. Yellow background denotes an electorate win by a list member, or other incumbent. A ✓ or ✗ denotes status of any incumbent, win or lose respectively.						
Party	Candidate	Votes	%	±%	Party votes	%	±%
CDU	Anna-Marie Bischof	45,653	30.1	▲6.1	41,681	27.4	▲5.9
AfD	Renate Glaser	36,357	24.0	▲13.6	36,109	23.7	▲12.9
SPD	Philipp Rottwilm	42,943	28.3	▼11.0	34,060	22.4	▼13.9
Greens	Maximilian Kohler	8,704	5.7	▼3.1	11,875	7.8	▼2.3
Left	Jürgen Bachmann	7,975	5.3	▲2.6	8,625	5.7	▲2.5
BSW					6,522	4.3	New
FDP	Andreas Rethagen	4,330	2.9	▼5.9	6,169	4.1	▼7.0
FW	Markus Lappe	5,767	3.8	▲0.8	3,081	2.0	▼0.4
Tierschutzpartei					2,270	1.5	▲0.1
PARTEI					726	0.5	▼0.4
Volt					610	0.4	▲0.2
BD					200	0.1	New
Humanists					91	0.1	0.0
MLPD					26	<0.1	0.0
Informal votes		1,854			1,538		
Total valid votes		151,729			152,045		
Turnout		153,583	84.2	▲8.1			
CDU gain from SPD	Majority	2,710	1.8	N/A			

=== 2021 election ===
Federal election (2021): Schwalm-Eder
Notes:	Blue background denotes the winner of the electorate vote. Pink background denotes a candidate elected from their party list. Yellow background denotes an electorate win by a list member, or other incumbent. A ✓ or ✗ denotes status of any incumbent, win or lose respectively.						
Party	Candidate	Votes	%	±%	Party votes	%	±%
SPD	✓ Edgar Franke	54,792	39.3	▲1.7	50,100	36.0	▲4.6
CDU	Anna-Maria Bischof	33,443	24.0	▼6.4	29,913	21.5	▼7.7
AfD	Albrecht Glaser	14,380	10.3	▼1.7	15,047	10.8	▼2.1
Greens	Bettina Hoffmann	12,360	8.9	▲3.3	14,089	10.1	▲3.5
FDP	Bastian Belz	12,234	8.8	▲2.3	15,422	11.1	▲1.9
FW	Markus Rainer Lappe	4,112	3.0	▲0.6	3,440	2.5	▲1.1
Left	Heidemarie Scheuch-Paschkewitz	3,761	2.7	▼2.8	4,411	3.2	▼3.3
Tierschutzpartei					1,996	1.4	▲0.5
PARTEI	Clara Luisa Baumann	2,024	1.5		1,209	0.9	▲0.2
dieBasis	Hermann-Theodor Ploppa	1,451	1.0		1,396	1.0	
Pirates					504	0.4	0.0
Independent	Alexander Klement	435	0.3				
Team Todenhöfer					270	0.2	
Gesundheitsforschung					251	0.2	
NPD					244	0.2	▼0.3
Bündnis C	Alfred Härtzsch	262	0.2		233	0.2	
Volt					215	0.2	
ÖDP					126	0.1	0.0
Humanists					92	0.1	
V-Partei3					73	0.1	▼0.1
Bündnis 21					48	0.0	
DKP					43	0.0	0.0
LKR					34	0.0	
MLPD					15	0.0	0.0
Informal votes		2,240			2,323		
Total valid votes		139,254			139,171		
Turnout		141,494	76.1	▼1.4			
SPD hold	Majority	21,349	15.3	▲8.1			

=== 2017 election ===
Federal election (2017): Schwalm-Eder
Notes:	Blue background denotes the winner of the electorate vote. Pink background denotes a candidate elected from their party list. Yellow background denotes an electorate win by a list member, or other incumbent. A ✓ or ✗ denotes status of any incumbent, win or lose respectively.						
Party	Candidate	Votes	%	±%	Party votes	%	±%
SPD	✓ Edgar Franke	53,892	37.7	▼4.7	44,847	31.4	▼5.2
CDU	Bernd Siebert (Note: Siebert entered the Bundestag on the CDU list after the resignation of Oswin Veith in March 2020.)	43,514	30.4	▼9.2	41,795	29.2	▼6.4
AfD	Albrecht Glaser	17,198	12.0		18,504	12.9	▲7.5
FDP	Elias Knell	9,298	6.5	▲4.3	13,118	9.2	▲4.5
Greens	Bettina Hoffmann	8,003	5.6	▼0.2	9,436	6.6	▼1.1
Left	Heidemarie Scheuch-Paschkewitz	7,852	5.5	▲0.5	9,270	6.5	▲1.0
FW	Matthias Köhler	3,330	2.3	▲0.8	1,968	1.4	▲0.2
Tierschutzpartei					1,287	0.9	
PARTEI					935	0.7	▲0.3
NPD					652	0.5	▼0.7
Pirates					519	0.4	▼1.3
BGE					180	0.1	
DM					173	0.1	
V-Partei³					161	0.1	
ÖDP					128	0.1	
DKP					33	0.0	
MLPD					26	0.0	0.0
BüSo					20	0.0	0.0
Informal votes		2,656			2,691		
Total valid votes		143,087			143,052		
Turnout		145,743	77.5	▲3.5			
SPD hold	Majority	10,378	7.3	▲4.6			

=== 2013 election ===
Federal election (2013): Schwalm-Eder
Notes:	Blue background denotes the winner of the electorate vote. Pink background denotes a candidate elected from their party list. Yellow background denotes an electorate win by a list member, or other incumbent. A ✓ or ✗ denotes status of any incumbent, win or lose respectively.						
Party	Candidate	Votes	%	±%	Party votes	%	±%
SPD	✓ Edgar Franke	57,944	42.3	▲2.0	50,052	36.5	▲2.6
CDU	Bernd Siebert	54,162	39.6	▲6.0	48,747	35.6	▲6.6
Greens	Hermann Häusling	7,884	5.8	▼0.9	10,498	7.7	▼1.6
Left	Heidemarie Scheuch-Paschkewitz	6,890	5.0	▼3.1	7,442	5.4	▼3.8
AfD					7,394	5.4	
FDP	Dennis Majewski	3,005	2.2	▼7.4	6,362	4.6	▼9.5
Pirates	Alexander Kaufmann	2,771	2.0		2,306	1.7	0.0
FW	Engin Eroglu	2,154	1.6		1,592	1.2	
NPD	Martin Braun	2,019	1.5	▼0.1	1,532	1.1	▼0.2
PARTEI					529	0.4	
REP					229	0.2	▼0.2
PRO					162	0.1	
SGP					58	0.0	
BüSo					46	0.0	▼0.1
MLPD					32	0.0	0.0
Informal votes		4,836			4,684		
Total valid votes		136,829			136,981		
Turnout		141,665	74.0	▼0.2			
SPD hold	Majority	3,782	2.7	▼4.0			

=== 2009 election ===
Federal election (2009): Schwalm-Eder
Notes:	Blue background denotes the winner of the electorate vote. Pink background denotes a candidate elected from their party list. Yellow background denotes an electorate win by a list member, or other incumbent. A ✓ or ✗ denotes status of any incumbent, win or lose respectively.						
Party	Candidate	Votes	%	±%	Party votes	%	±%
SPD	Edgar Franke	56,519	40.3	▼9.8	47,585	33.9	▼11.1
CDU	Bernd Siebert (Note: Siebert entered the Bundestag on the CDU list after the resignation of Lucia Puttrich in September 2010.)	47,053	33.6	▼0.4	40,592	28.9	▲0.4
FDP	Nils Weigand	13,487	9.6	▲4.8	19,854	14.2	▲4.3
Left	Heidemarie Scheuch-Paschkewitz	11,395	8.1	▲3.3	12,958	9.2	▲3.5
Greens	Engin Eroglu	9,370	6.7	▲2.2	12,935	9.2	▲2.0
Pirates					2,382	1.7	
NPD	Frank Körner	2,275	1.6	▼0.1	1,813	1.3	▼0.2
Tierschutzpartei					1,256	0.9	▲0.2
REP					556	0.4	▼0.4
DVU					128	0.1	
BüSo					119	0.1	0.0
MLPD					37	0.0	0.0
Informal votes		4,391			4,275		
Total valid votes		140,099			140,215		
Turnout		144,490	74.2	▼5.6			
SPD hold	Majority	9,466	6.7	▼9.5			

=== 2005 election ===
Federal election (2005):Schwalm-Eder
Notes:	Blue background denotes the winner of the electorate vote. Pink background denotes a candidate elected from their party list. Yellow background denotes an electorate win by a list member, or other incumbent. A ✓ or ✗ denotes status of any incumbent, win or lose respectively.						
Party	Candidate	Votes	%	±%	Party votes	%	±%
SPD	✓ Gerd Höfer	76,040	50.1	▼2.2	68,359	45.0	▼4.3
CDU	Bernd Siebert	51,474	33.9	▼1.4	43,426	28.6	▼4.0
Left	Peter Pawlak	7,402	4.9	▲3.6	8,738	5.8	▲4.7
FDP	Reinhold Hocke	7,328	4.8	▼1.0	14,995	9.9	▲2.3
Greens	Hermann Häusling	6,776	4.5	▼0.8	10,953	7.2	▲0.3
NPD	Barbara Schommer	2,608	1.7		2,237	1.5	▲1.1
REP					1,183	0.8	0.0
Tierschutzpartei					1,110	0.7	▲0.3
GRAUEN					532	0.4	▲0.2
SGP					159	0.1	
BüSo					109	0.1	0.0
MLPD					82	0.1	
Informal votes		5,175			4,920		
Total valid votes		151,628			151,883		
Turnout		156,803	79.8	▲0.7			
SPD hold	Majority	24,566	16.2				
