= Eder Uplands =

The Eder Uplands (German: Ederbergland, German pronunciation) refers to a region in North Hesse in Germany. It covers several municipalities that lies around the upper reaches of the Eder river on the edge of the Rothaar Mountains. The Eder Uplands includes a large part of the old county of Frankenberg, which was absorbed into Waldeck-Frankenberg in the wake of the administrative reforms.

In addition to Frankenberg, the municipalities of the Eder Uplands include Battenberg, Allendorf, Hatzfeld and Bromskirchen. The term Eder Uplands (Ederbergland) is used especially in the tourism industry.
