= Liesen =

- Ortsteil of Hallenberg
- Interactive map of Liesen
- Location within Germany Location within North Rhine-Westphalia
- Coordinates: 51°8′6.3″N 8°37′3.8″E
- Country: Germany
- State: North Rhine-Westphalia
- Admin. region: Arnsberg
- District: Hochsauerlandkreis
- Municipality: Hallenberg

Area
  - Total: 7.38 km^{2} (2.85 sq mi)
- Elevation: 450 m (1,480 ft)

Population (2010)
  - Total: 780
  - Density: 110/km^{2} (270/sq mi)
- Time zone: UTC+01:00 (CET)
  - Summer (DST): UTC+02:00 (CEST)
- Postal codes: 59969
- Dialling codes: 02984
- Vehicle registration: HSK
- Website: Official website

Liesen is a village and a civil parish (Ortsteil) of the German town of Hallenberg, the southernmost town of the Hochsauerland region in expiring massif of Rothaar at the border to Hessen, just about 15 km from Winterberg in North Rhine-Westphalia. As of 2010 its population was of 780.

== History ==
The village was first mentioned in 1313. As the two other Ortsteil of Hallenberg Liesen was, until 1974, an autonomous municipality belonging to the former District of Brilon and to the Amt Hallenberg.

== Geography ==
Liesen is located 3 km in north of Hallenberg, close to Hesborn and to the mountain range of Rothaargebirge. It is circa 5 km far from Bromskirchen, a municipality in the bordering state of Hesse. It is served by the road L617.

== See also ==
- Hallenberg
- Braunshausen
- Hesborn
