= Hesborn =

- Ortsteil of Hallenberg
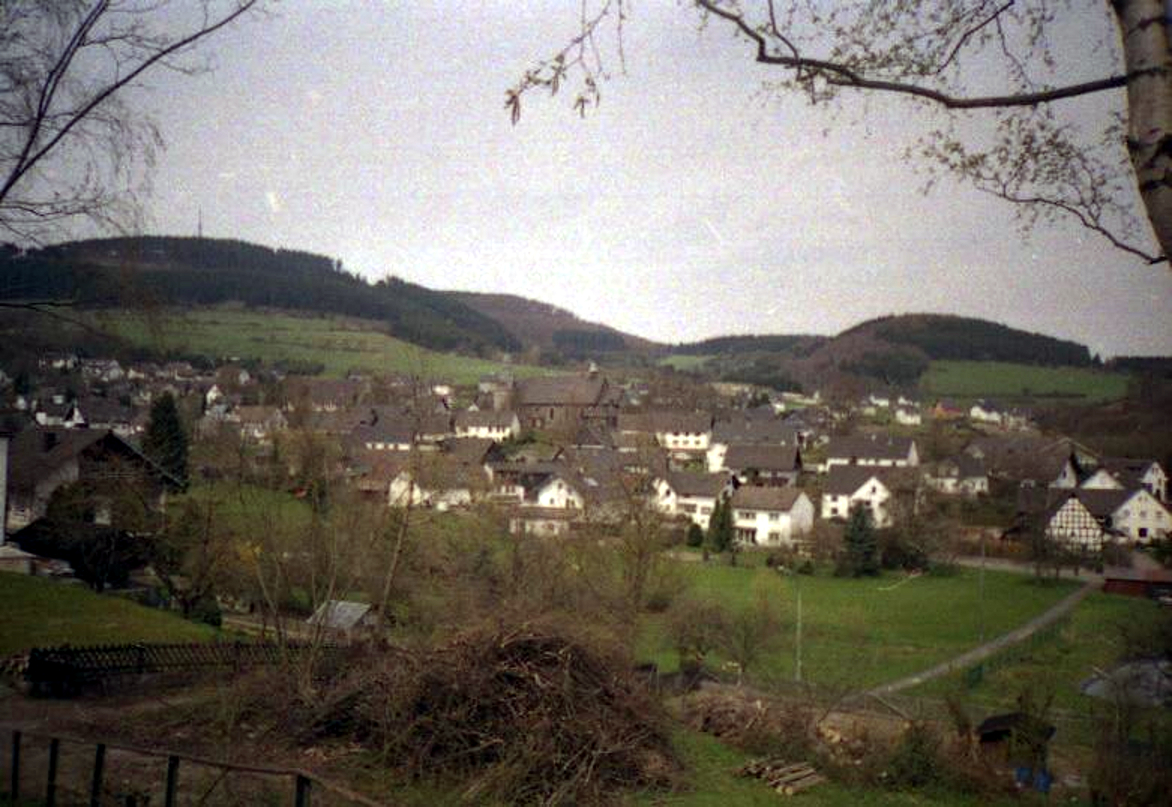
- Interactive map of Hesborn
- Location within Germany Location within North Rhine-Westphalia
- Coordinates: 51°8′58.78″N 8°37′38.79″E
- Country: Germany
- State: North Rhine-Westphalia
- Admin. region: Arnsberg
- District: Hochsauerlandkreis
- Municipality: Hallenberg

Area
  - Total: 14.18 km^{2} (5.47 sq mi)
- Elevation: 459–522 m (1,506–1,713 ft)

Population (2010)
  - Total: 1,060
  - Density: 74.8/km^{2} (194/sq mi)
- Time zone: UTC+01:00 (CET)
  - Summer (DST): UTC+02:00 (CEST)
- Postal codes: 59969
- Dialling codes: 02984
- Vehicle registration: HSK
- Website: Official website

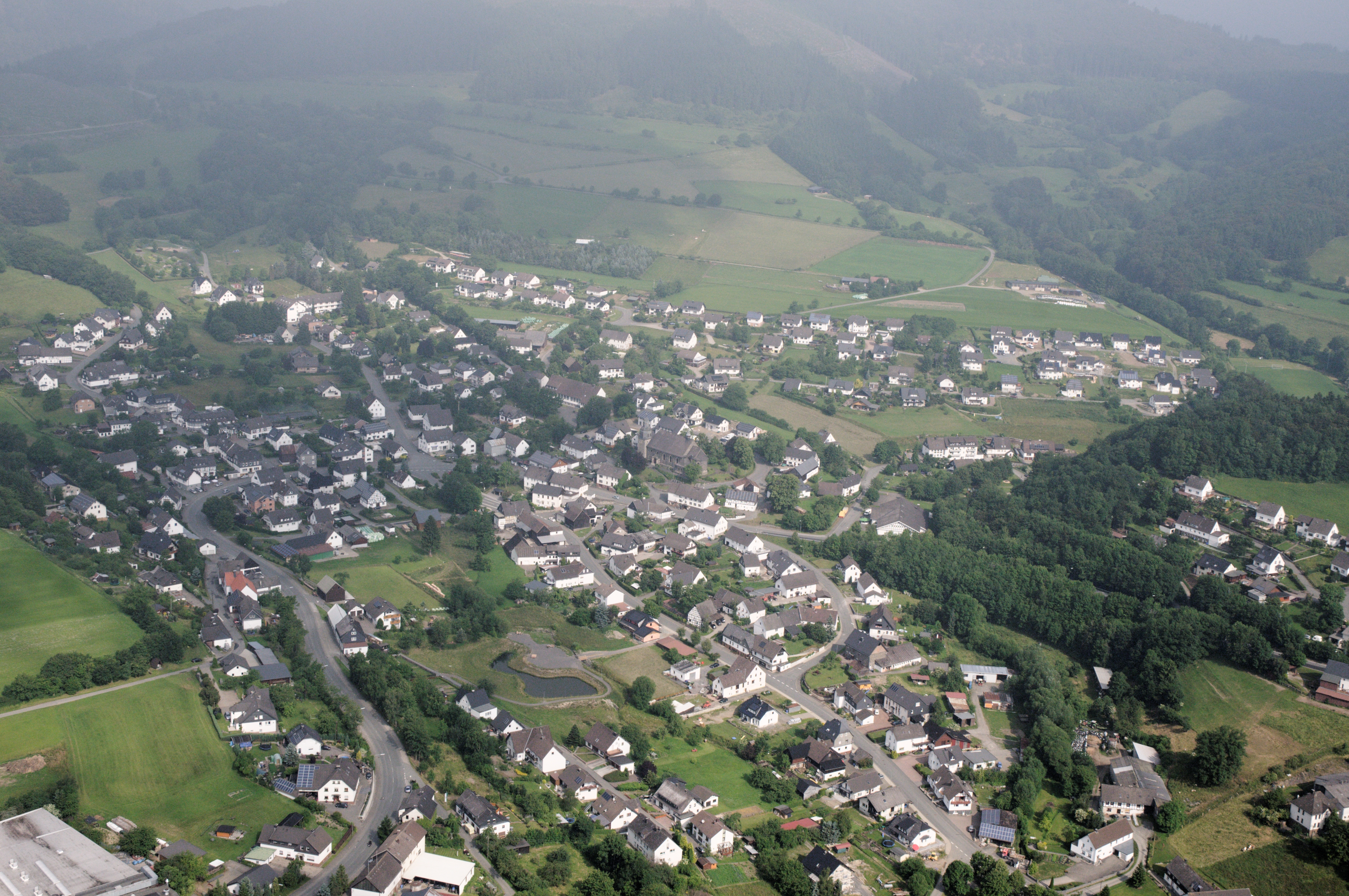
Hesborn 2013

Hesborn is a village and a civil parish (Ortsteil) of the German town of Hallenberg, located in the Hochsauerlandkreis district in North Rhine-Westphalia. As of 2010 its population was of 1,060.

== History ==
The village was first mentioned as Hersporen in 1126. As the two other Ortsteil of Hallenberg Hesborn was, until 1974, an autonomous municipality belonging to the former District of Brilon and to the Amt Hallenberg. In 1975 it was incorporated into the city of Hallenberg.

== Geography ==
Hesborn is located 4,5 km in north of Hallenberg, close to Liesen and to the Bollerberg, a mountain belonging to the mountain range of Rothaargebirge. It is 7 km far from Bromskirchen, a municipality in the bordering state of Hesse. It is served by the road L617 and crossed by the river Nuhne.

== See also ==
- Hallenberg
- Braunshausen
- Liesen
