= Hallenberg =

- Town
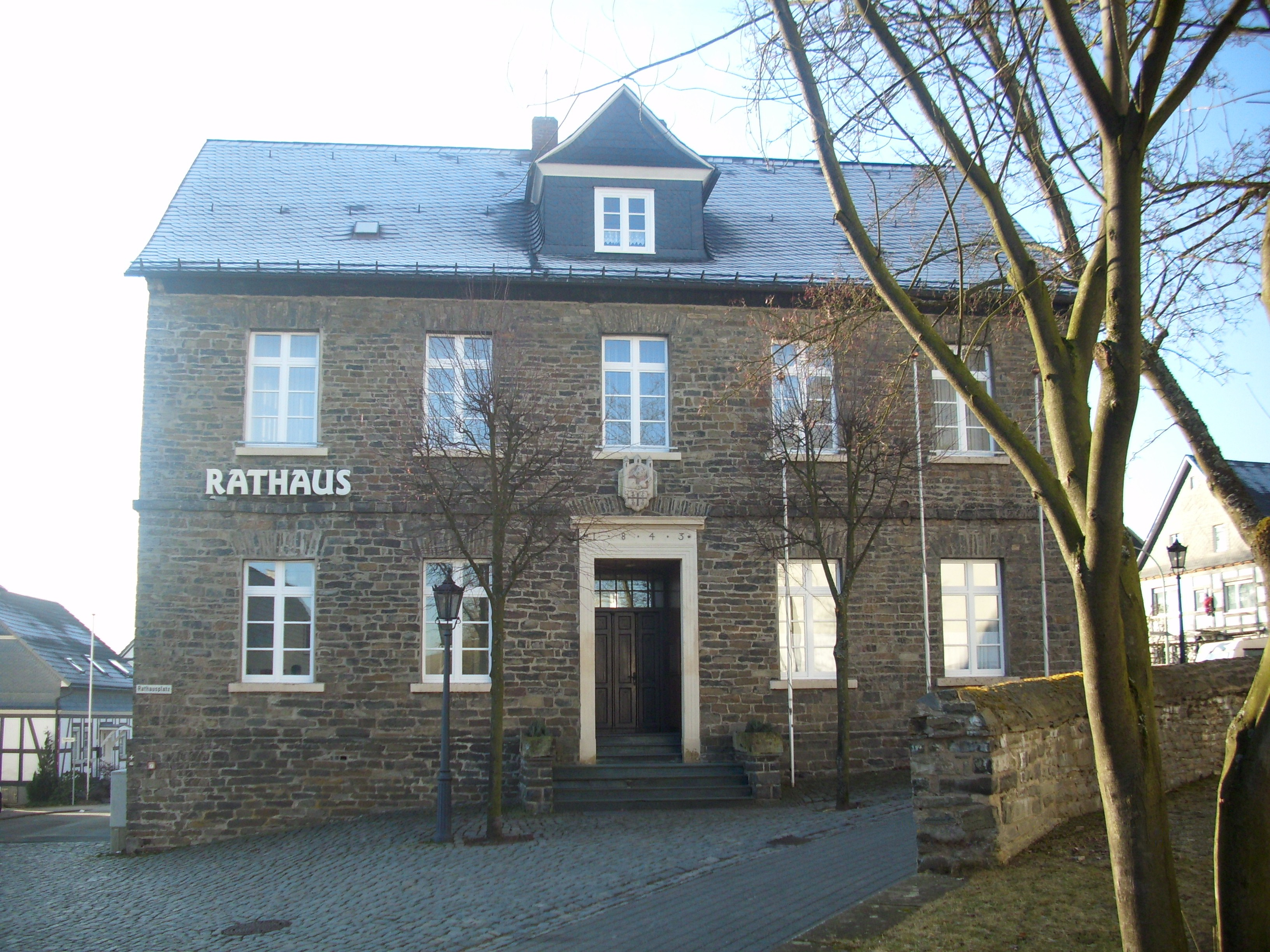
- Town hall

- Flag Coat of arms

- Location of Hallenberg within Hochsauerlandkreis district
- Interactive map of Hallenberg
- Location within Germany Location within North Rhine-Westphalia
- Coordinates: 51°06′42″N 08°37′23″E
- Country: Germany
- State: North Rhine-Westphalia
- Admin. region: Arnsberg
- District: Hochsauerlandkreis
- Subdivisions: 4

Government
  - Mayor (2020–25): Enrico Eppner (FDP)

Area
  - Total: 65.35 km^{2} (25.23 sq mi)
- Elevation: 420 m (1,380 ft)

Population (2025-12-31)
  - Total: 4,272
  - Density: 65.37/km^{2} (169.3/sq mi)
- Time zone: UTC+01:00 (CET)
  - Summer (DST): UTC+02:00 (CEST)
- Postal codes: 59969
- Dialling codes: 02984
- Vehicle registration: HSK
- Website: Official website

Hallenberg (German pronunciation: [ˈhalənˌbɛʁk]) is a town in the Hochsauerland district, in North Rhine-Westphalia, Germany.

== Geography ==
Hallenberg is situated approximately 15 km southeast of Winterberg and 35 km north of Marburg (in Hesse).

=== Neighbouring places ===
- Allendorf (in Hesse)
- Bad Berleburg
- Bromskirchen (in Hesse)
- Frankenberg, Hesse
- Lichtenfels, Hesse
- Medebach
- Winterberg

=== Division of the town ===
Hallenberg consists of 4 districts: the town proper and 3 villages:

- Hallenberg (2,660 inhabitants, 34.72 km²)
- Braunshausen (350 inhabitants, 9.08 km²)
- Hesborn (1,060 inhabitants, 14,18 km²)
- Liesen (780 inhabitants, 7,38 km²)

== Population ==
Historical population

Year	Pop.	±% p.a.
1965	4,536	—
1970	4,683	+0.64%
1975	4,744	+0.26%
1980	4,669	−0.32%
1985	4,631	−0.16%
1990	4,845	+0.91%
1995	4,997	+0.62%

Year	Pop.	±% p.a.
2000	4,732	−1.08%
2005	4,581	−0.65%
2010	4,391	−0.84%
2015	4,541	+0.67%
2020	4,490	−0.23%
2025	4,272	−0.99%

Source: Landesdatabank Nordrhein-Westfalen

== Personalities ==
- Adolf Winkelmann (born 1946), film director and producer

== Currency ==
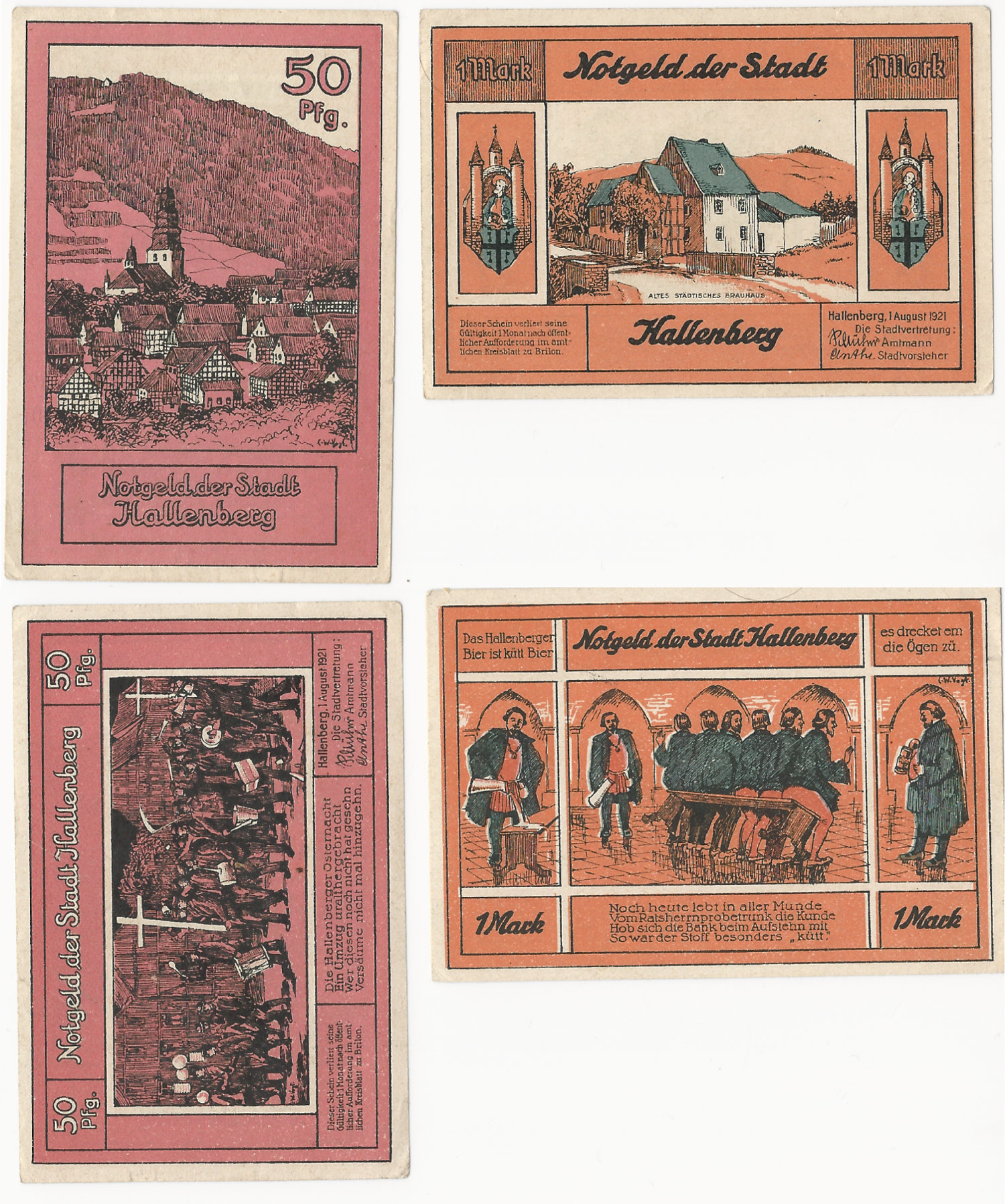
50 Pfg and 1 Mark Notgeld issued by Hallenberg in 1921

From 1917 until the 1920s Hallenberg, like many German towns, produced its own currency, known as Notgeld. During the First World War this was because the value of the official coinage exceeded its face value, so coins were hoarded or sold for their metal, and then from about 1923 the rate of hyperinflation meant that the central bank could not print and distribute the ever-higher banknote values quickly enough, so this was done locally.

== Gallery ==
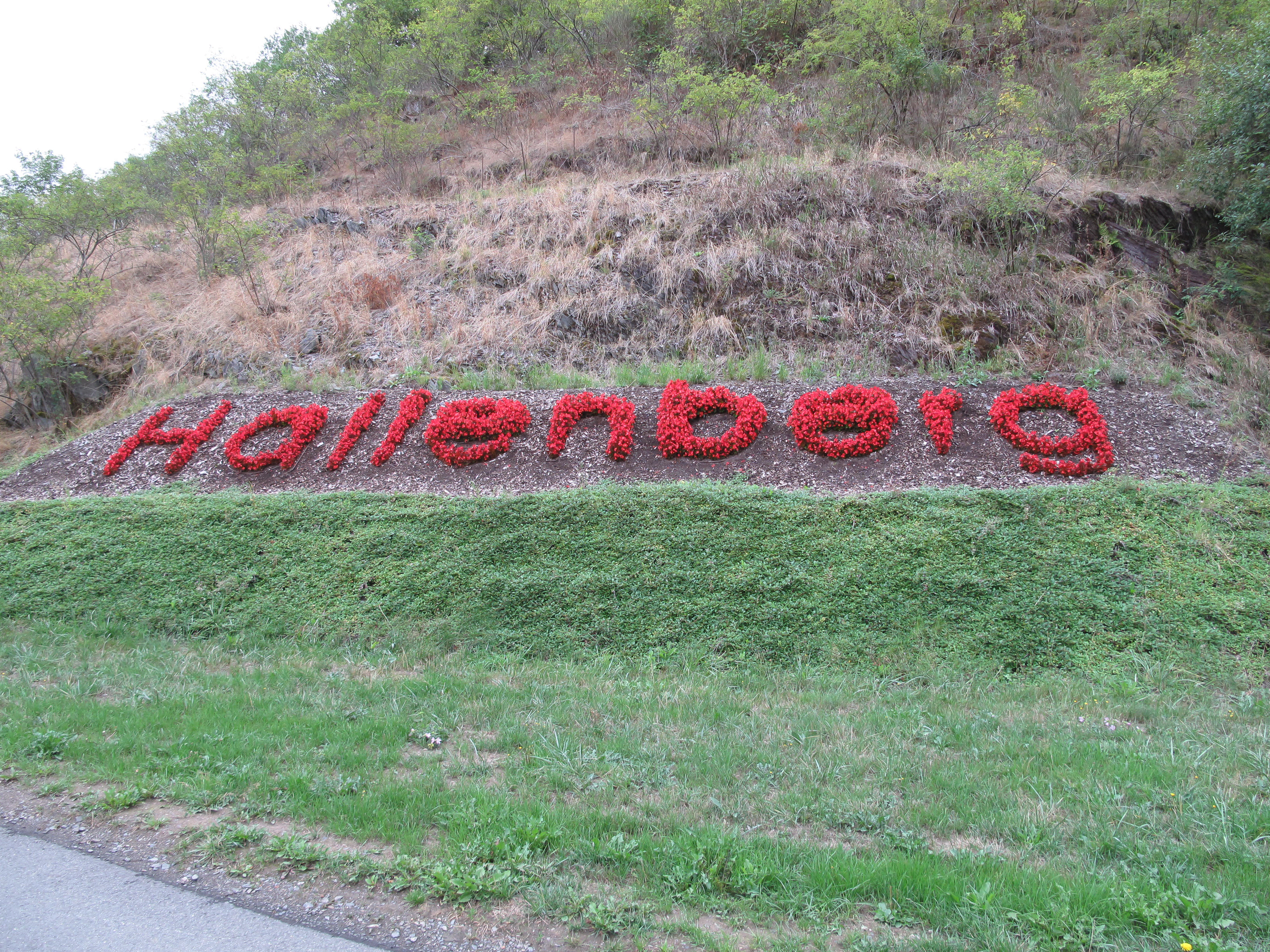
Hallenberg in flowers

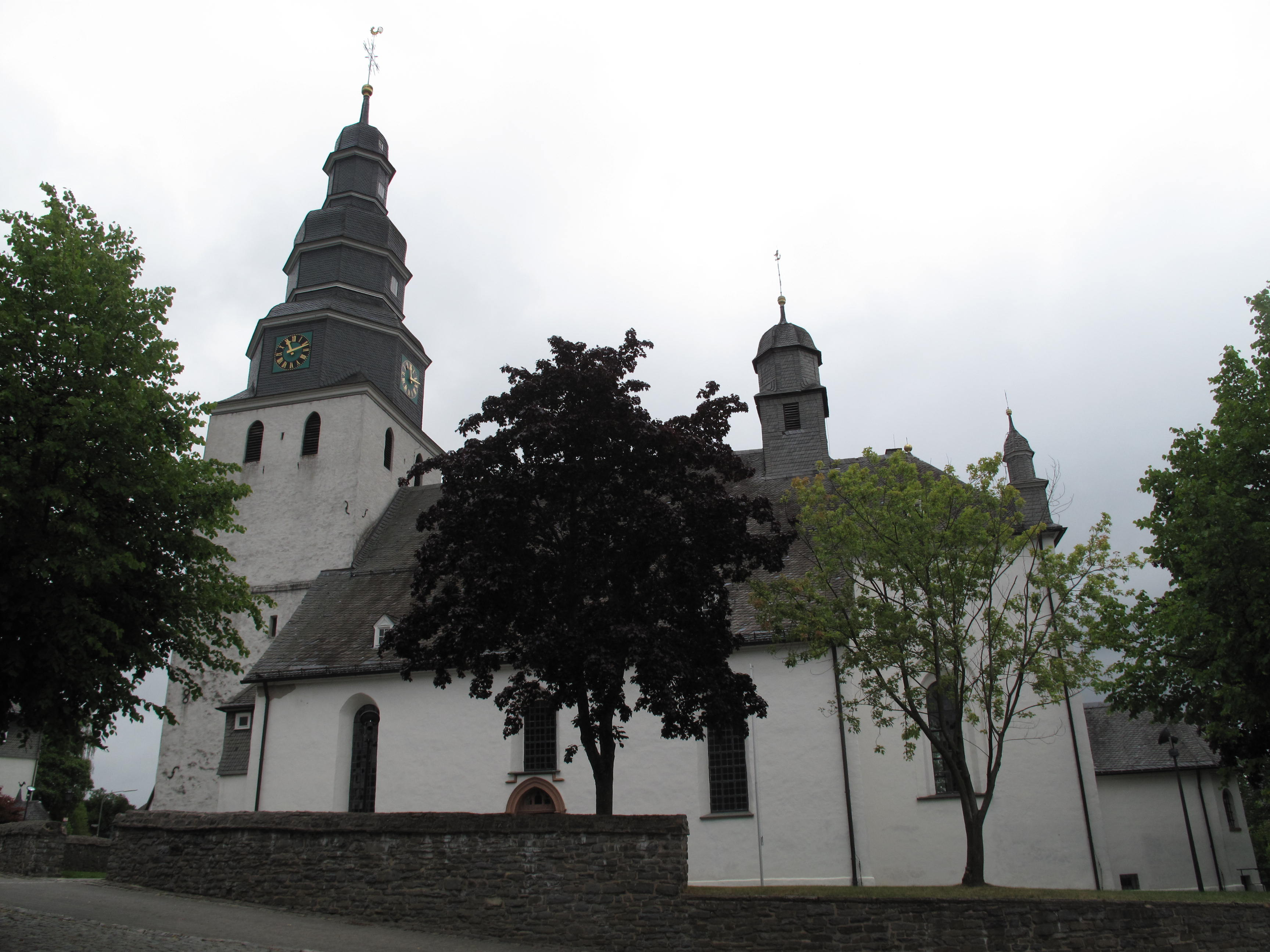
St. Heribert's church

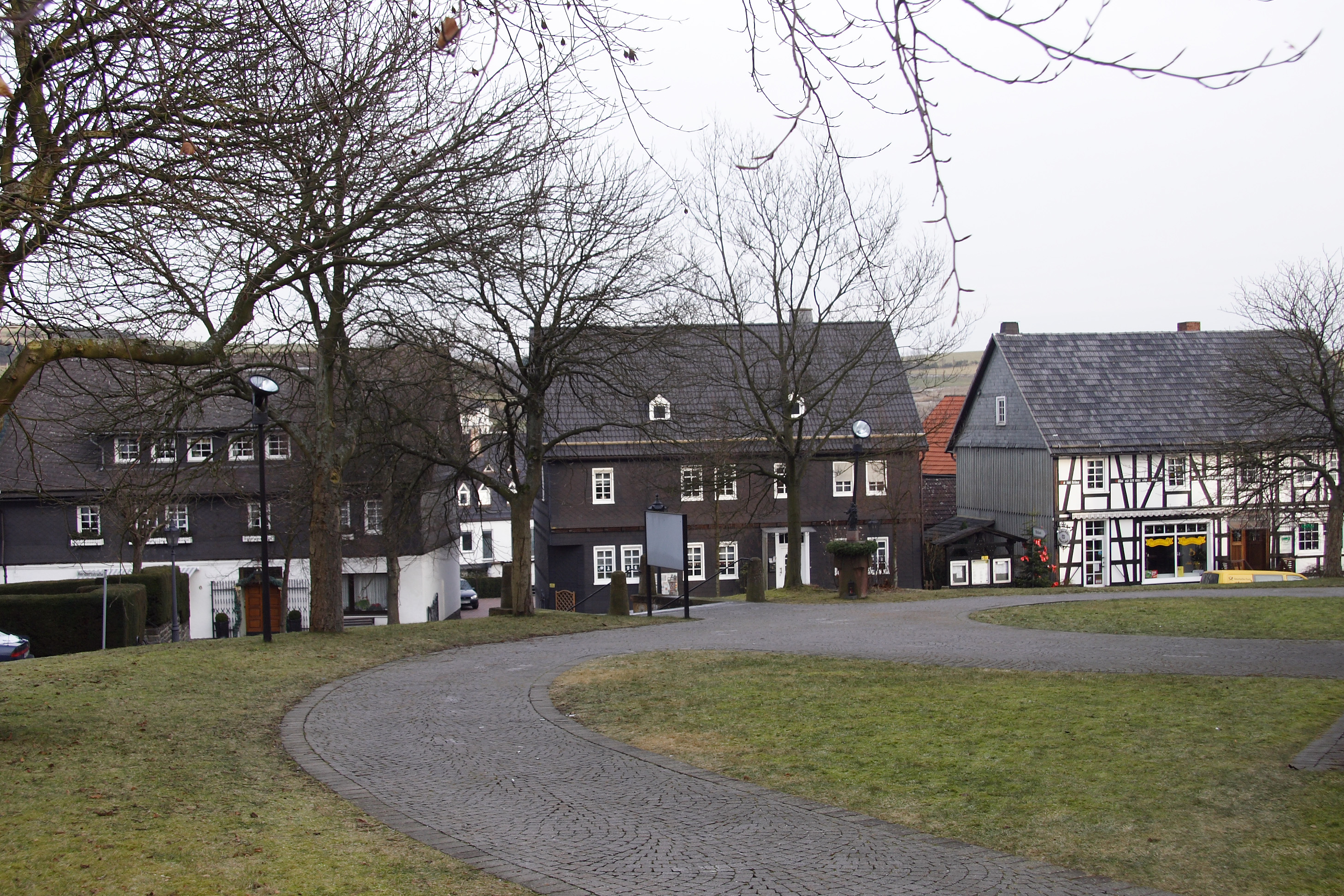
Buildings in Kirchstraße

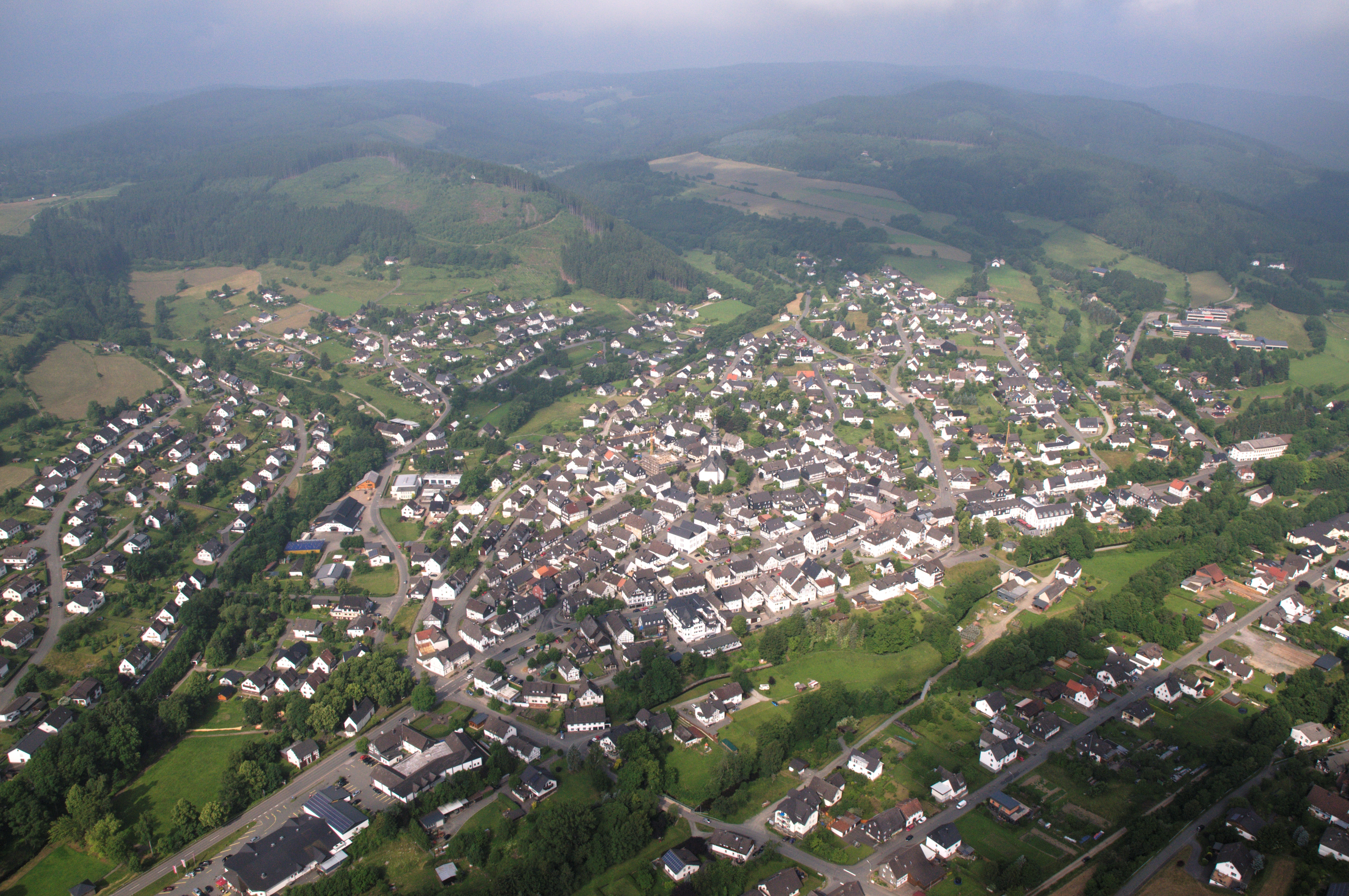
Hallenberg 2013
