= Lichtenfels, Hesse =

Lichtenfels
- Town
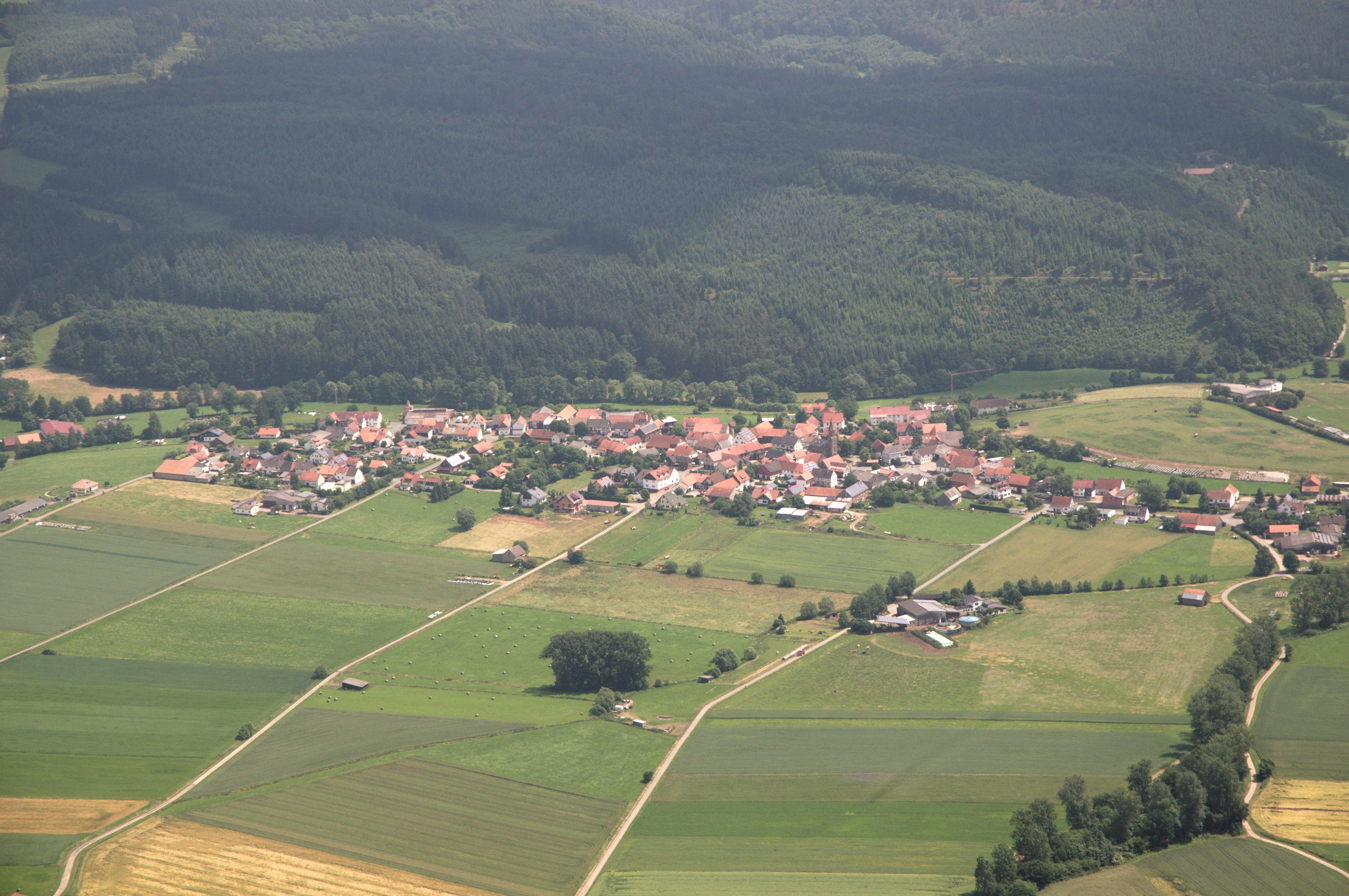
- Aerial photograph (2013)

- Coat of arms

- Location of Lichtenfels within Waldeck-Frankenberg district
- Interactive map of Lichtenfels
- Location within Germany Location within Hesse
- Coordinates: 51°9′N 8°48′E
- Country: Germany
- State: Hesse
- Admin. region: Kassel
- District: Waldeck-Frankenberg

Government
  - Mayor (2019–25): Henning Scheele

Area
  - Total: 96.77 km^{2} (37.36 sq mi)
- Elevation: 410 m (1,350 ft)

Population (2025-12-31)
  - Total: 4,011
  - Density: 41.45/km^{2} (107.4/sq mi)
- Time zone: UTC+01:00 (CET)
  - Summer (DST): UTC+02:00 (CEST)
- Postal codes: 35104
- Dialling codes: 05636
- Vehicle registration: KB
- Website: Stadt Lichtenfels

Lichtenfels (German pronunciation: [ˈlɪçtn̩ˌfɛls]) is a small town in Waldeck-Frankenberg district in northwest Hesse, Germany.

== Geography ==
=== Location ===
Lichtenfels lies at the northeast foot of the Rothaargebirge, some 80 km (50 mi) southwest of Kassel. It is not far from the western end of the Edersee in the southwest of the Waldecker Land. Bordering on the west is the Medebacher Bucht, or Medebach Bight, although this is not a bight in the conventional sense, being dry land. Bordering on the south is the Breite Struth (hills).

The municipal area, across which the town's outlying centres are broadly scattered, is crossed by the rivers Orke and Aar. In the northeast, it borders on the Itter Valley, in the east on the Eder Valley, beyond which rises the Kellerwald range, and in the south on the Nuhne Valley.

=== Extent of municipal area ===
With its area of nearly 100 km², almost 40% of which is wooded, Lichtenfels is among the largest and most wooded municipalities in the district.

=== Neighbouring municipalities ===
Lichtenfels borders in the north on the town of Korbach, in the east on the municipality of Vöhl, in the south on the town of Frankenberg (all in Waldeck-Frankenberg), and in the west on the towns of Hallenberg and Medebach (both in the Hochsauerlandkreis in North Rhine-Westphalia).

== Constituent municipalities ==
The town of Lichtenfels was made up from six municipalities and two towns: Dalwigksthal, Fürstenberg, Goddelsheim, Immighausen, Münden, Neukirchen, Rhadern and Sachsenberg.

== History ==
In 1971, as part of municipal reforms, the eight formerly independent municipalities joined together to form a new, greater municipality, choosing the name Lichtenfels after the castle, the oldest noble seat in Waldeck.

=== Dalwigksthal ===
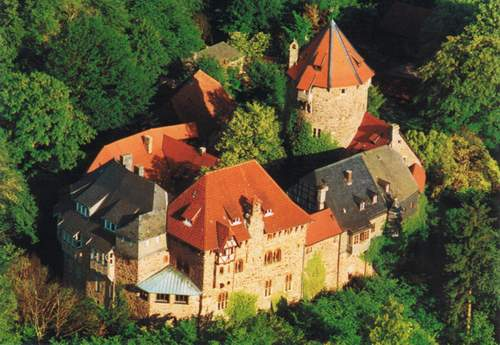
Castle Lichtenfels

For a long time after the Castle Lichtenfels was built high above the Orke about 800 years ago, almost nobody gave Dalwigksthal any thought. Lichtenfels's newest constituent municipality celebrated 150 years of existence in 2001. As a result of the Waldeck Law of 24 January 1851, the estates of Kampf, Sand and Lichtenfels as well as the settlements and mills found there were merged into the village of Dalwigksthal.

However, there is tell of a valley municipality in this place in the Middle Ages named Eisenbeck from the 14th century to the late 18th century. In 1598, this is recorded as Ensenbecke. The Castle Lichtenfels was built in 1189 by the Abbot of Corvey. Shortly thereafter, it was destroyed, but built anew between 1223 and 1230. On 21 July 1267, Corvey pledged to Count Adolf of Waldeck, among other things, Schloss Lichtenfels (the castle). After fierce feuds, Corvey had to pass entitlement to the castle's ownership to Count Otto of Waldeck for good in 1297.

The Archbishop of Cologne, as Duke of Westphalia, raised claim to the places Münden, Neukirchen and Rhadern in the Amt of Lichtenfels, which in the 16th and 17th centuries led to protracted trials and battles. In the course of these disagreements, the castle is assumed to have once again been destroyed early in the 17th century. A partial reconstruction was done in 1631, with a broader plan carried out between 1908 and 1914. In the late 1980s, an entrepreneurial family bought the castle, which by then was once again falling into disrepair and gave it a comprehensive makeover. Dalwigksthal's church, which for ages had belonged to the parish of Münden, is now part of the parish of Sachsenberg. Once, the chapel was a burying ground for the von Dalwigk family. Not much remains of the mediaeval chapel; only the Gothic quire is still preserved, likely built early in the 14th century. The current nave was newly built in 1620.

Lichtenfels's smallest constituent municipality has roughly 200 inhabitants.

=== Goddelsheim ===
Goddelsheim with its roughly 1,450 inhabitants is the biggest of Lichtenfels's constituent municipalities. The village lies 70 km southwest of Kassel. It is about 25 km east to the Edersee (dam) by road. The district seat of Korbach is roughly 10 km away. In 1988, Goddelsheim celebrated the village's 1100th anniversary of documentary mention. From one of King Arnulf's documents from 888 comes the first mention of Goddelsheim, but presumably, its history goes much further back. Witness to this is the discovery of some forgotten graves in the area that date back much earlier than the 9th century.

Things have not always been as peaceful in Goddelsheim as they are today. For instance, in 1548 and 1627, the Electors of Cologne tried to introduce the Catholic faith into the Evangelical village by force. Thanks to the resistance of the Schaaken Monastery, which held the patronage rights to Goddelsheim, the Electors' plans fell through.

Of the formerly three noble estates in the village, the last was divided up in 1904. Nevertheless, agriculture still plays a rôle. Furthermore, there are shops, handicraft businesses, a bank and a savings bank. Many people who live in Goddelsheim do not actually work there, but commute to jobs in Korbach or Frankenberg. Eleven clubs offer a variety of leisure activities. Goddelsheim is not only the biggest constituent municipality but also the seat of the town's administration. It has a church kindergarten, a primary school and Lichtenfels's central school (Mittelpunktschule).

=== Immighausen ===
The place that is now Lichtenfels's constituent municipality of Immighausen first came to history's attention about 850 when Countess Ida transferred her goods near Ymminchusen to Corvey Abbey. There are documents beginning in 1028. Over the ages the place has had many names, with its original name being recorded as Yraminchusen, followed by a succession of other forms: Ymmichusen (about 1190), Immyngchusen (about 1200), Ymenchusen (1336), Imminchusen (about 1350), Immickhusen (1422), Imminckhausen (1537) and Immeckusen (1541). History records that in 1028 a farm at Imminghusen was transferred by the Abbot of Corvey, at Emperor Conrad's behest, to the dowager Alvered's son. In 1189 the place was a Corvey fief under the Counts of Waldeck. The church at Immighausen was first mentioned in 1223 as being a chapel among the Schaaken Monastery's estates. The church has a square tower and a single nave. Immighausen is shaped by agriculture, but there is industry. The oldest club is the 110-year-old men's singing club "Liedertafel". Furthermore, there are the women's choir, the Landfrauen, the sport club with its subgroup the "Klostermönche" ("Monastery Monks") and the fire brigade. The Lichtenfels regional group of the Waldeck History Club (Waldeckischer Geschichtsverein) also has its seat in Immighausen. In the village live 402 people.

=== Rhadern ===
With roughly 370 inhabitants, Rhadern is the smallest of Lichtenfels's constituent municipalities. Its first documentary mention came in 1473, though already about 830, history mentions something about a place called Ryadra. Over the ages, Rhadern has had a number of different names. About 1020 the village was called Radirinhusen, about 1125, Rotheren. In 1336 when Count Heinrich of Waldeck pledged, among other things, this village to Count Johann of Nassau as a dowry for his daughter, it was called Rodern. Later names for it were Raderen (about 1350), Radehausen (1420) and Rädern (1738). In 1473, when Rhadern had its first documentary mention, the village was deserted. It was at this time that the von Dalwigk family were granted the forsaken hamlet along with the rest of the Amt of Lichtenfels as a fief. As of this time, Rhadern belonged to the Amt and the von Dalwigk Freistuhl of Lichtenfels. The chapel lying on the way out of the village towards Fürstenberg was separated from its mother church in 1260 and raised to a parish in its own right. Owing to the church's destruction, the municipality was parochially united with Fürstenberg in the 15th century. Rhadern parishioners even had their own entrance to the church there, and their own pews. About 1700, the municipality was parochially united with Münden. Once the chapel had been built anew in 1755, Rhadern once again had its own church, which was expanded in the 1970s. The centre of the small chapel is a winged altar. The villagers are kept busy as members of various clubs, there being, besides the fire brigade and the Lichtenfels sporting municipality a music club with various subgroups, the "Discoteam" and the Landfrauen ("Country Women") with a dance group.

=== Neukirchen ===
Up the Nuhne at the boundary with Rengershausen was a village or farm called "Aweshausen" or "Auweshausen". The field names in the area, "Auf der Aue" and "Auf der Junkernaue" recall the former centre. In 1336, Count Heinrich IV of Waldeck pledged, among other things, the village of Nuwenkyrchen to Count Johann of Nassau as a dowry for his daughter (see also Rhadern above), which also gave Neukirchen its first documentary mention. Already by 1301, though, history records a Ditmar von Nuwenkyrchen, Juryman at Sachsenberg, proof that there had already been a settlement there for some time before the Count's daughter's wedding. In the disputes between the Electors of Cologne and Waldeck, which had begun in 1533, the Elector of Cologne claimed, among other properties, Neukirchen. By 1663, however, Cologne had forgone its claim to the village, thus also bringing an end to the Electors' attempts to reintroduce the Catholic faith into the municipality. Neukirchen was a branch of the parish of Münden and in the 18th century temporarily a parish in its own right. Today it belongs to the parish of Sachsenberg. The church with its rectangular nave was newly built in 1864 by the master mason Gülich from Sachsenberg where an older forerunner church had once stood which had to be torn down. How the church looked before the new building was put up is not known with any certainty, as there are no reliable indications. The first new church, which was the village's namesake (Neukirchen ≈ new church), must have been built sometime before 1336 – the time of Neukirchen's first documentary mention – but a more precise indication of its building date is not possible.

The first part of what is today Neukirchen arose as a scattered village – one with an irregular layout – and nowadays forms the upper village. It was purely a farming municipality, and by all indications arose from a lordly estate. By and by arose also the lower village as a thorpe, or linear village. It harboured day labourers, workers and craftsmen. The schoolhouse was built in 1785. After the Second World War, a bigger school was built, which was closed in 1976. In this village, shaped by agriculture, live 488 people. Many of them are active in the five clubs.

=== Münden ===
In 1028, Emperor Konrad acknowledged that the Abbot of Corvey Abbey had given the dowager Alvered the estate at Gimundia for her lifelong use, thereby giving Münden its first documentary mention. Late in the 13th century, Corvey Abbey pledged the Amt of Münden to Count Otto of Waldeck. In a disagreement between Corvey and the Counts of Waldeck, Münden was awarded to the Counts in 1321 through arbitration. Münden, too, was included in Count Heinrich IV's pledge to Count Johann of Nassau as part of the former's daughter Elisabeth's dowry (see also Rhadern and Neukirchen above). As of 1473, Münden, which until then had been seat of a Corvey and later Waldeck Amt, belonged to the von Dalwigk Amt of Lichtenfels. In the disputes between the Electors of Cologne and Waldeck, Cologne also claimed Münden. However, as with Neukirchen, the Electors forwent their claim in 1663.

Today, Münden, lying between Dalwigksthal and Medebach in Westphalia, belongs to Lichtenfels as a constituent municipality. Earlier names for the village besides Gimundia were Gemundi (1120), Gimunden (1125), Munden (1298), Gemonden (1321), Gemunden (1336, 1473) and Dreckmünden (1679). The village lies about 1,500 m from North Rhine-Westphalia and is home to about 420 people.

=== Fürstenberg ===
Fürstenberg, once Waldeck's and Hesse's smallest town, was first mentioned as a town in 1254. Remains of the old town wall can still be seen in the historic town core. This little town in the Waldecker Land is wrapped in many stories and sagas. One of them is the Hedgehog Saga (Igelsage) which has also given the town the name "Igelstadt". It says that a hedgehog kept Count Heinrich of Waldeck from coming a cropper when his horse shied before it. To this day, the Igelfest (Hedgehog Festival) is still celebrated in Fürstenberg on the Monday before Whitsun.

== Politics ==
=== Town council ===
The town council's 23 seats are apportioned thus, in accordance with municipal elections held on 26 March 2006:

CDU	8 seats
SPD	7 seats
FDP	4 seats
WGL	3 seats
Unabhängig Pro Lichtenfels	1 seat

Note: The last two named are citizens' coalitions.

== Culture and sightseeing ==
- Castle Lichtenfels
- Schloss Reckenberg (stately home)
- Schaaken Monastery ruins

=== Fürstenberg ===
- Village shop
- Nordic walking school
- "Nordic walking paradise"
- Nature study diorama
- Kneipp centre

=== Sachsenberg ===
- Village pond
