= Braunshausen =

- Ortsteil of Hallenberg
- Interactive map of Braunshausen
- Location within Germany Location within North Rhine-Westphalia
- Coordinates: 51°6′51.18″N 8°40′47.68″E
- Country: Germany
- State: North Rhine-Westphalia
- Admin. region: Arnsberg
- District: Hochsauerlandkreis
- Town: Hallenberg
- Founded: 1474

Area
  - Total: 9.08 km^{2} (3.51 sq mi)
- Elevation: 356–405 m (1,168–1,329 ft)

Population (2010)
  - Total: 350
  - Density: 39/km^{2} (100/sq mi)
- Time zone: UTC+01:00 (CET)
  - Summer (DST): UTC+02:00 (CEST)
- Postal codes: 59969
- Dialling codes: 02984
- Vehicle registration: HSK

Braunshausen is a village and a civil parish (Ortsteil) of the German town of Hallenberg, located in the Hochsauerlandkreis district in North Rhine-Westphalia. As of 2010 its population was of 350.

== History ==
The village was founded in 1474. As the two other Ortsteil of Hallenberg Braunshausen was, until 1974, an autonomous municipality belonging to the former District of Brilon and to the Amt Hallenberg.

== Geography ==
Braunshausen is located in the south-eastern corner of the Hochsauerlandkreis, close to the borders with Hesse and to Rengershausen, a village belonging to the town of Frankenberg. It is 4,5 km far from Hallenberg.

== See also ==
- Hallenberg
- Liesen
- Hesborn
