= Battenberg (Eder) =

- Town
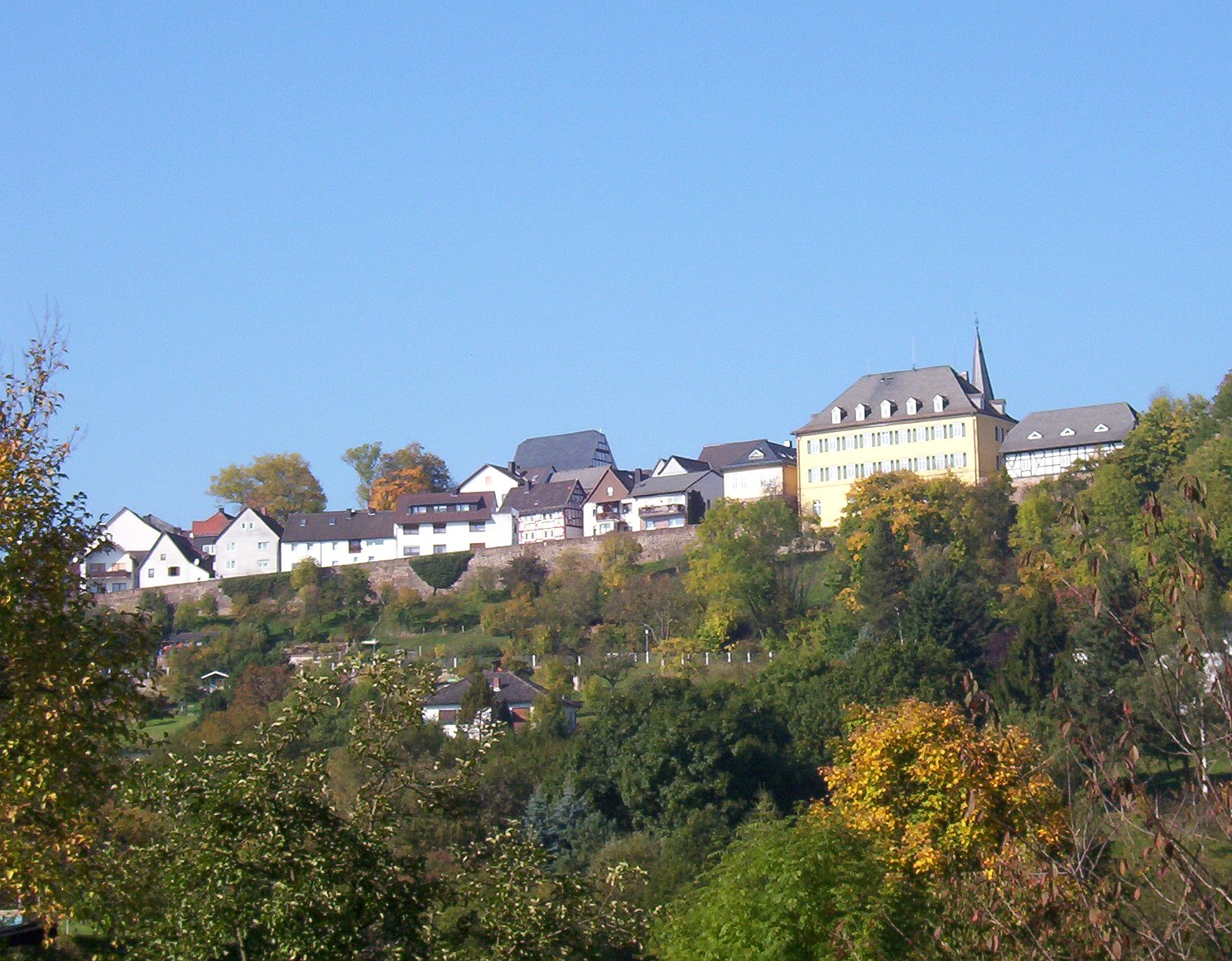
- Oberstadt (Upper Town) with Neuburg (New Castle)

- Coat of arms

- Location of Battenberg within Waldeck-Frankenberg district
- Interactive map of Battenberg
- Location within Germany Location within Hesse
- Coordinates: 51°01′N 08°39′E
- Country: Germany
- State: Hesse
- Admin. region: Kassel
- District: Waldeck-Frankenberg
- Subdivisions: 4 Ortsteile

Government
  - Mayor (2020–26): Christian Klein

Area
  - Total: 64.71 km^{2} (24.98 sq mi)
- Elevation: 340 m (1,120 ft)

Population (2025-12-31)
  - Total: 5,463
  - Density: 84.42/km^{2} (218.7/sq mi)
- Time zone: UTC+01:00 (CET)
  - Summer (DST): UTC+02:00 (CEST)
- Postal codes: 35088
- Dialling codes: 06452
- Vehicle registration: KB
- Website: www.battenberg-eder.de

Battenberg (German pronunciation: [ˈbatn̩ˌbɛʁk]) is a small town in the district of Waldeck-Frankenberg in the state of Hesse, Germany. It is located on the river Eder, a tributary of the Fulda, which flows into the Weser, and lies at the southeastern edges of the Rothaar Mountains. The closest larger cities are Marburg, Siegen, and Kassel, and the town is approximately equally far away from Frankfurt am Main, Cologne, and Dortmund.

In 1624, Battenberg was incorporated into the Landgraviate of Hesse-Darmstadt (since 1806 the Grand Duchy of Hesse) as part of the so called Hessian Hinterland, an almost-exclave, which was connected to Upper Hesse (de) only through a tiny corridor west of Gießen. The "Hinterland" was annexed by the Kingdom of Prussia in 1866, and merged with the territories of the former Duchy of Nassau, to form the Province of Hesse-Nassau in 1868. From 1918 on, the town lay in the Free State of Prussia, and since 1945, it is in the federal state of Hesse.

Battenberg is the origin of the medieval House of Battenberg (de), which was not related to the House of Hesse and ruled over the County of Battenberg (de) until it died out in 1310, and of the Battenberg family (in German called the "Haus Battenberg" = "House of Battenberg"), a morganatic branch of the Hesse-Darmstadt branch of the House of Hesse, which ruled over, among others, the Landgraviate of Hesse-Darmstadt (later the Grand Duchy of Hesse) until 1918, and the Landgraviate of Hesse-Kassel (later the Electorate of Hesse) until its annexation by Prussia in 1866. The literal translation of Battenberg, "Mountbatten" (Berg = mountain), is used by members of the British royal family.

The Battenberg cake and hence also the Battenburg markings both indirectly derive their name from the town.

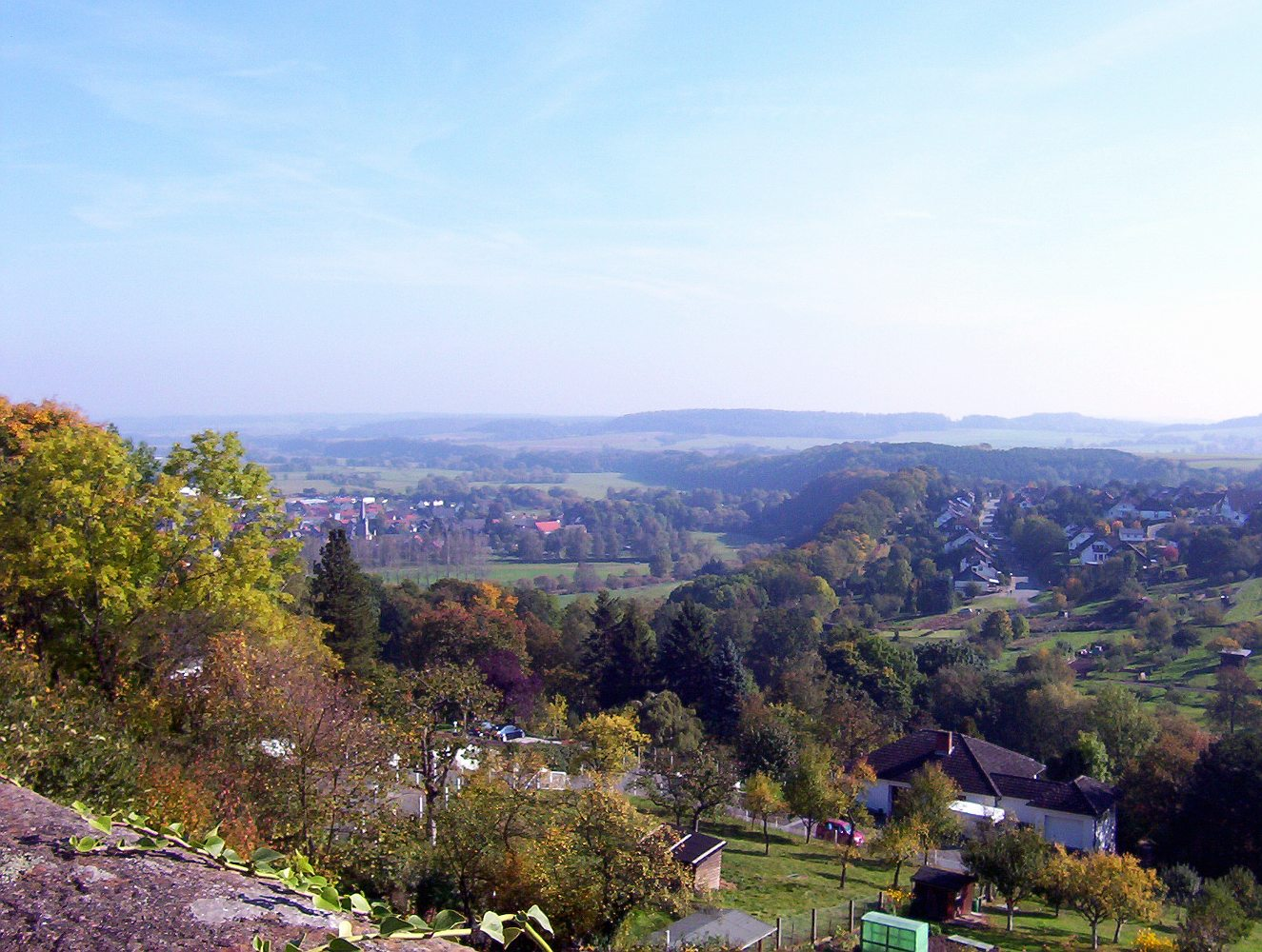
View from the upper town (Oberstadt) down into the Eder valley

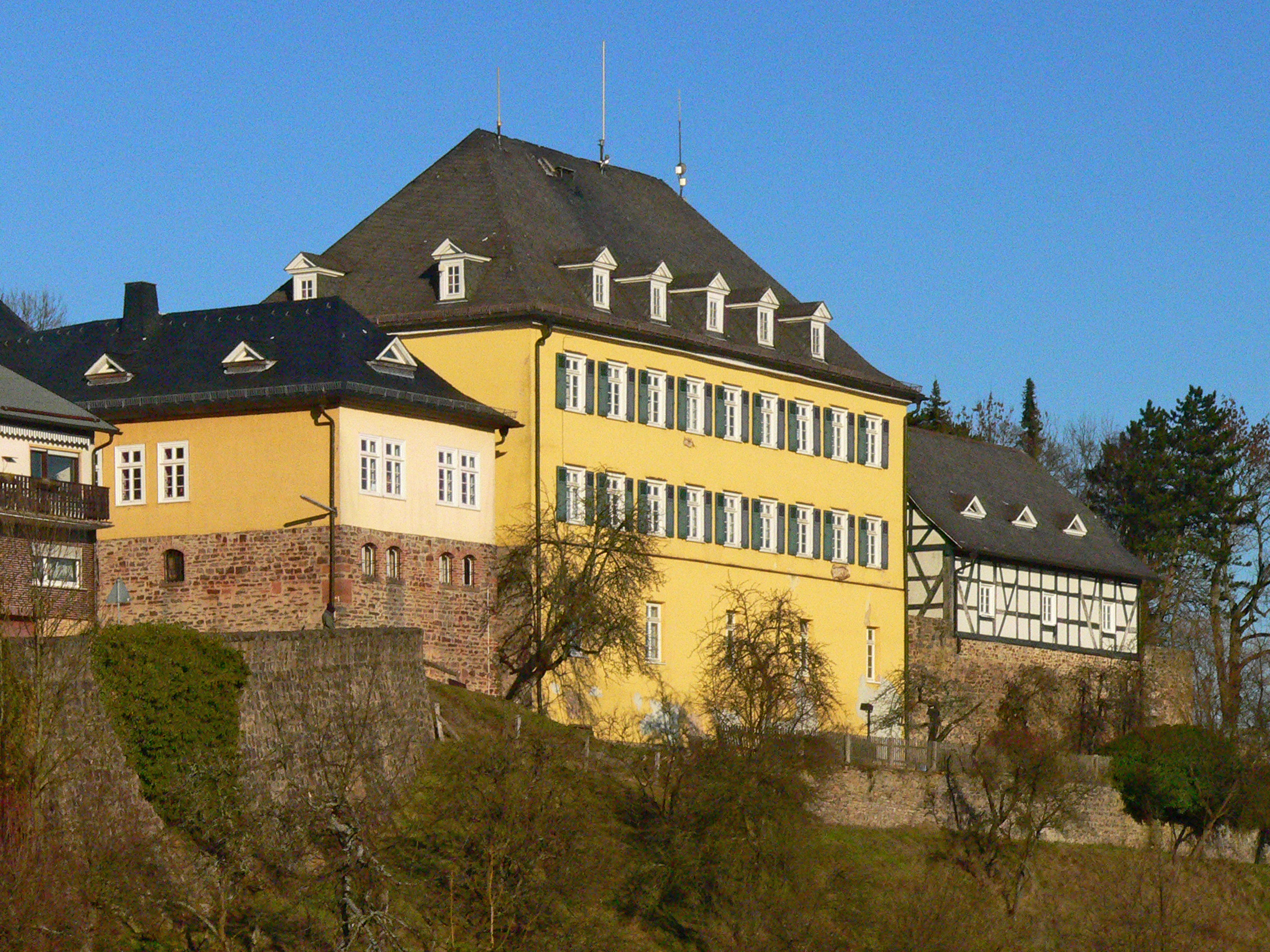
"Neuburg" (New Castle) (de:Neuburg (Battenberg)), sometimes also called "Schloss Battenberg" (Battenberg Palace)

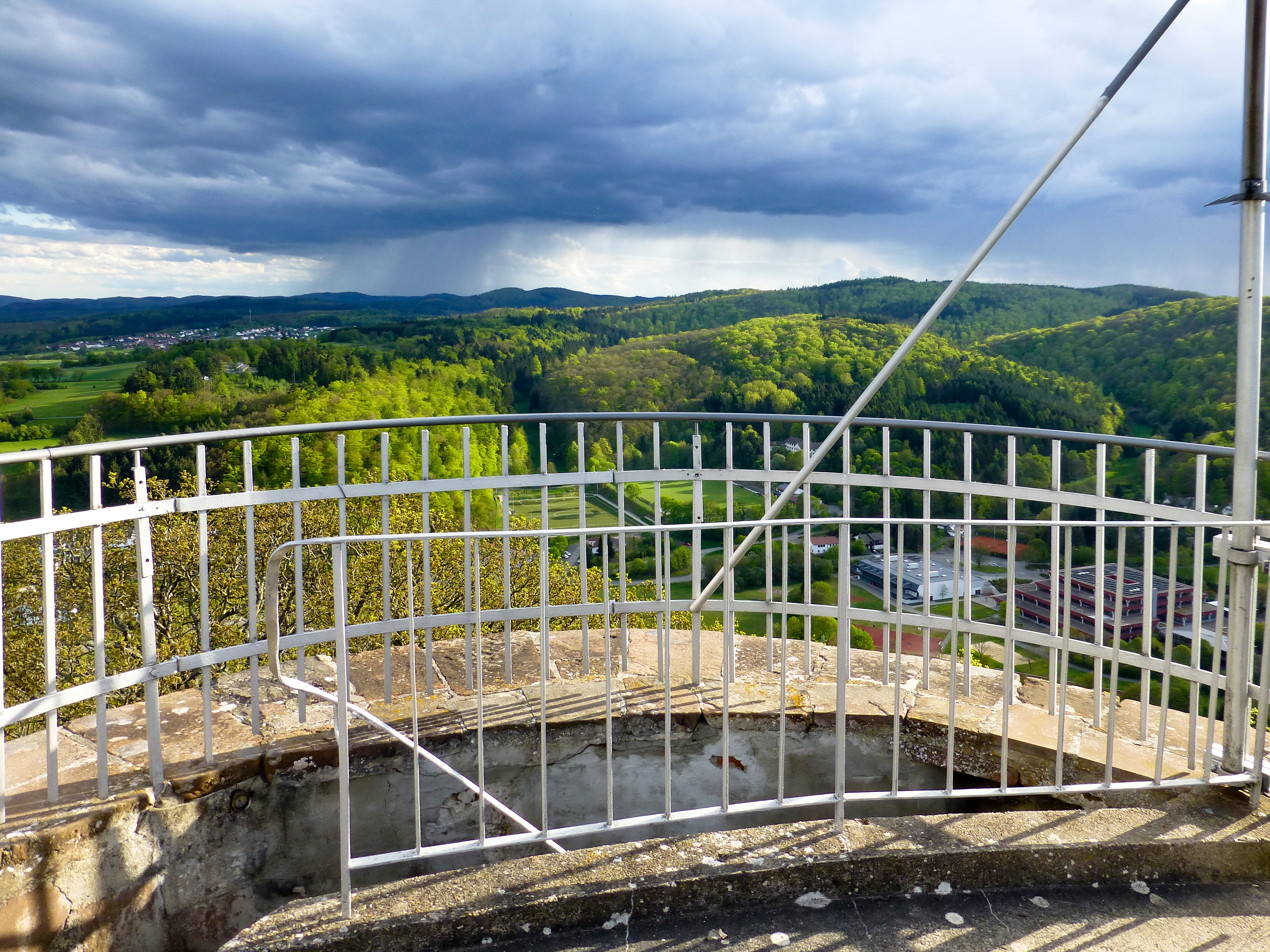
View from the ruin of the Kellerburg (de:Kellerburg)

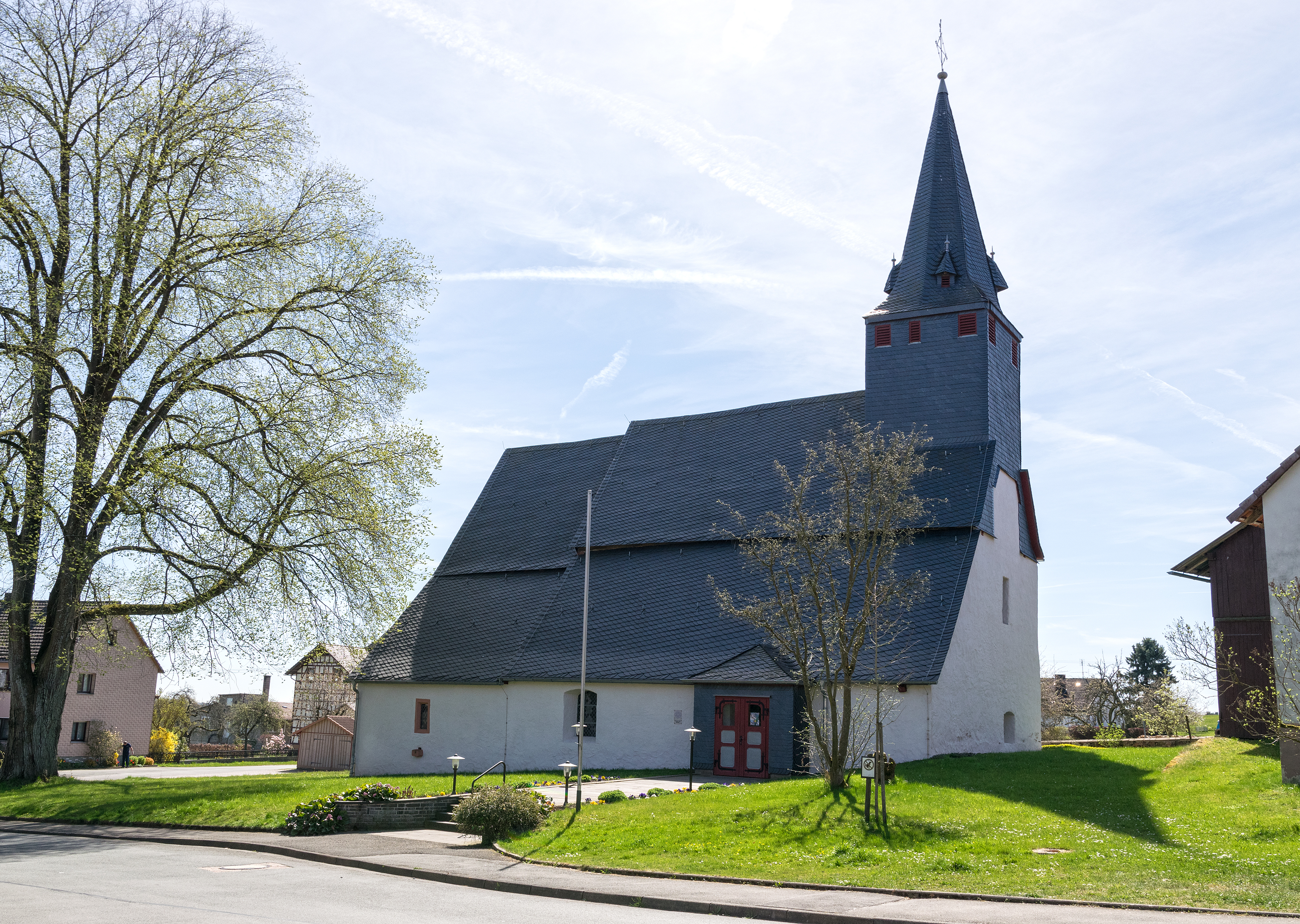
Church of Battenberg-Frohnhausen (de:Frohnhausen (Battenberg))

== Geography ==
=== Location ===
The centre of Battenberg lies in the Ederbergland, or Eder Highland, to which the Burgwald abutting the town to the east also belongs, on the southern edge of the Sauerland and the Rothaargebirge. Lying between 320 and 650 m above sea level, the town is also crossed by the river Eder.

=== Neighbouring municipalities ===
Battenberg borders in the north on the municipality of Bromskirchen, in the northeast on the municipality of Allendorf, in the southeast on the municipality of Burgwald (all three in Waldeck-Frankenberg), in the south on the municipality of Münchhausen am Christenberg (Marburg-Biedenkopf), and in the west on the towns of Hatzfeld (Waldeck-Frankenberg) and Bad Berleburg (Siegen-Wittgenstein in North Rhine-Westphalia).

=== Incorporated villages ===
Battenberg consists of:

- Battenberg proper including the tiny hamlet of Neu-Jägersdorf (de:Neu-Jägersdorf), also known as "Kröge", on the other side of the Eder.

and the incorporated villages of:

- Berghofen (de:Berghofen (Battenberg))
- Dodenau (de:Dodenau)
- Frohnhausen (de:Frohnhausen (Battenberg)): the farthest away from Battenberg proper.
- Laisa (de:Laisa)

Right next to Battenberg proper on the western side of the Eder is Battenfeld (de:Battenfeld), a district of the neighbouring town of Allendorf (Eder).

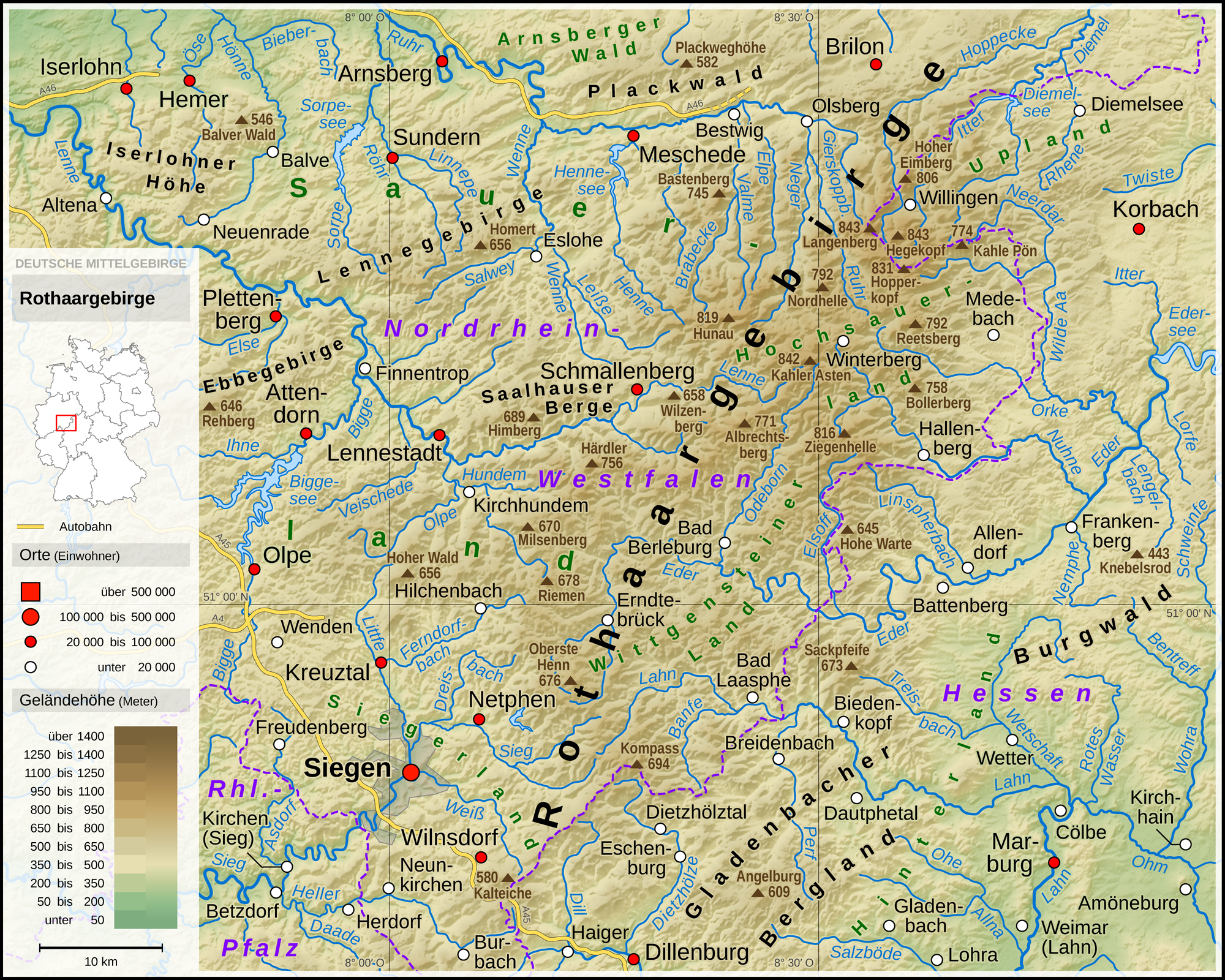
Map of the Rothaar Mountains with Battenberg visible at the eastern edges of the mountains, the Eder Uplands

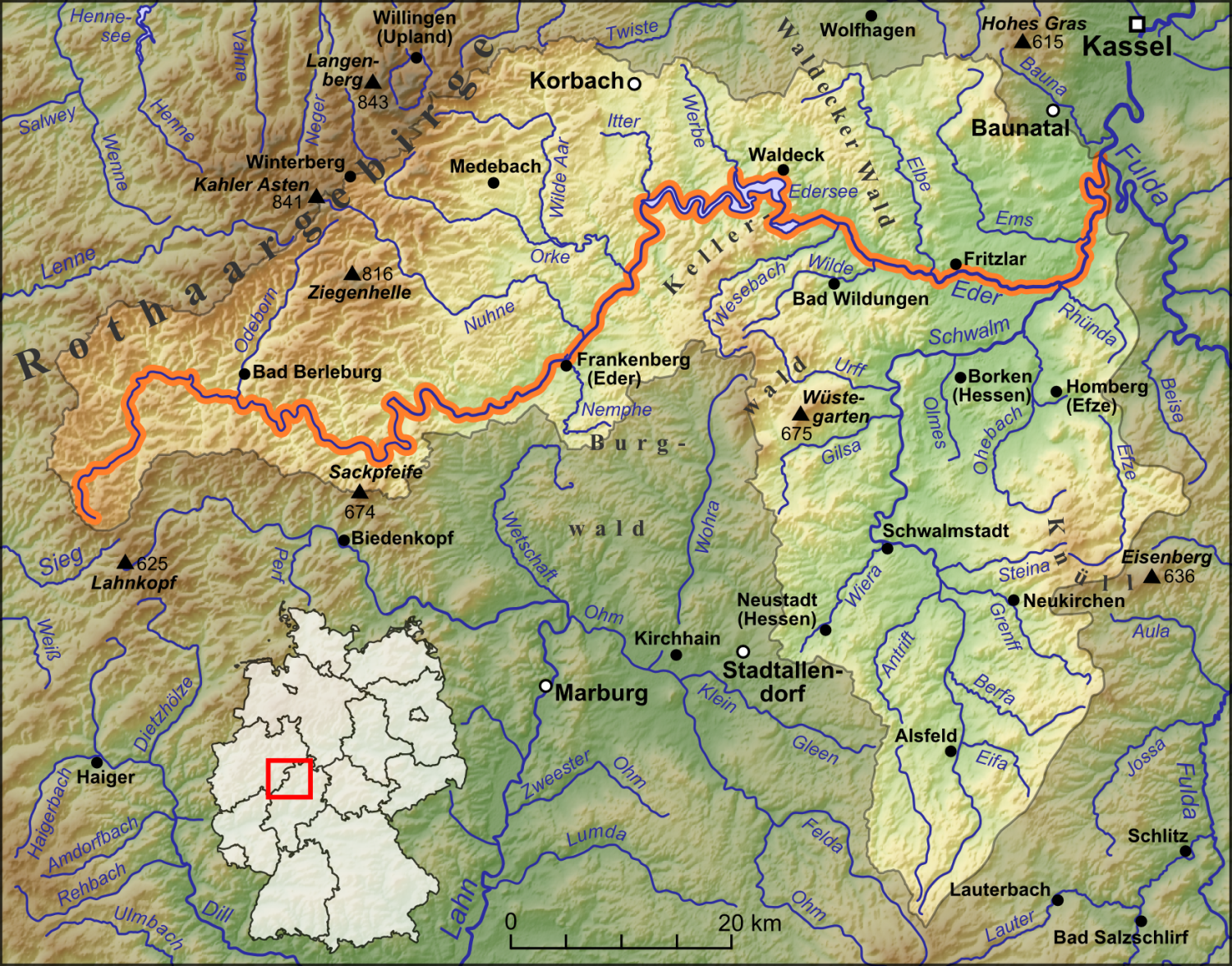
The course of the Eder. Battenberg (not on the map) is located approximately in the middle between Frankenberg (Eder) and the Sackpfeife mountain. The Eder flows into the Fulda near Edermünde-Grifte (de:Grifte). Kassel is visible in the northeast, on the Fulda, and Marburg in the south, on the Lahn.

Location of Battenberg within the district of Waldeck-Frankenberg

== History ==
In 778 fighting took place near Laisa and Battenfeld as part of Charlemagne's Saxon Wars. A branch of the Wittgenstein noble family began calling themselves the "Counts of Battenberg" in 1214 – compare Sayn-Wittgenstein. In 1232, Battenberg had its first documentary mention, and two years later it was granted town rights. The early-Gothic church dates from 1249. In 1297, the town's ownership was transferred to the Archbishops of Mainz. In 1464, the Amt of Battenberg passed to Hesse. In 1932, Battenberg became part of the Frankenberg/Eder district. As part of municipal reform in 1974, the districts of Frankenberg (including Battenberg) and Waldeck united to form the district of Waldeck-Frankenberg.

The dynasty of the counts of Battenberg ceased to exist in 1314, their castle was demolished throughout the following centuries. When Prince Alexander von Hessen-Darmstadt, the brother of the grand duke of Hesse, married Julia von Hauke, the orphaned daughter of the former Deputy Minister of War of Congress Poland, their liaison was not considered befitting of his rank. Therefore her brother-in-law made her countess of Battenberg in 1851 and princess of Battenberg in 1858. With her husband, who agreed to carry the same title and name, she lived near Seeheim-Jugenheim at "Schloss Heiligenberg", a re-modelled manor. Her sons Ludwig Alexander and Heinrich Moritz both served the British empire, their families anglicized their name to Mountbatten (Berg means "mountain, hill" in German) in 1917.

=== Population development ===
31 December 1988	: 5,099 inhabitants
31 December 1991	: 5,602 inhabitants
31 December 1995	: 5,693 inhabitants
31 December 2000	: 5,752 inhabitants
31 December 2004	: 5,701 inhabitants

== Politics ==
=== Town council ===
Municipal elections held on 6 March 2016 apportioned the town council's 31 seats thus:

Party name	Number of seats
CDU	6 seats
SPD	6 seats
Bürgerliste Stadt Battenberg	6 seats
Bürgerliste der Stadtteile Laisa, Frohnhausen und Berghofen	6 seats
Bürgerliste Dodenau	5 seats
FDP	2 seats

Note: Bürgerlisten are "citizens' lists", not actual political parties.

=== Coat of arms ===
Battenberg's civic coat of arms might heraldically be described thus: Per pale sable and argent.

The tinctures come from the arms borne by the town's old overlords, the Counts of Battenberg(a branch of the Counts of Wittgenstein). Battenberg's arms have their roots in the 13th century, putting them among Hesse's oldest municipal coats of arms.

Various other charges have appeared in the arms over the centuries, however. Sometimes it was a tower, the Count of Battenberg and the Archbishop of Mainz, the Archbishop by himself, or the Wheel of Mainz. One version even showed the same simple composition seen here, but with gules (red) instead of sable (black). This would have made the arms identical to those currently borne by Buchloe in Bavaria.

=== Town partnerships ===
- Senonches, France
- Romsey, United Kingdom
- Litvínov, Czech Republic
- Horní Jiřetín, Czech Republic
- Loon op Zand, Netherlands

=== Adoption ===
- In 1954, Battenberg "adopted" Sudeten Germans who had been driven out of the municipality of Obergeorgenthal (Horní Jiřetín) in the Brüx district.

== Notable people ==
- Andreas Steinhöfel (born 1962), writer and translator
- Leonie Schwertmann (born 1994), volleyball player
