= Allendorf (Eder) =

- Municipality
- Coat of arms

- Location of Allendorf within Waldeck-Frankenberg district
- Interactive map of Allendorf
- Location within Germany Location within Hesse
- Coordinates: 51°02′N 08°41′E
- Country: Germany
- State: Hesse
- Admin. region: Kassel
- District: Waldeck-Frankenberg
- Subdivisions: 8 Ortsbezirke

Government
  - Mayor (2023–29): Carsten Schäfer (Ind.)

Area
  - Total: 77.01 km^{2} (29.73 sq mi)
- Elevation: 306 m (1,004 ft)

Population (2025-12-31)
  - Total: 7,473
  - Density: 97.04/km^{2} (251.3/sq mi)
- Time zone: UTC+01:00 (CET)
  - Summer (DST): UTC+02:00 (CEST)
- Postal codes: 35108
- Dialling codes: 06452/06451
- Vehicle registration: KB
- Website: www.allendorf-eder.de

Allendorf with Viessmann factory

Allendorf (Eder) (German: [ˈaləndɔʁf]) is a municipality which situated in the north west of Hesse, Germany. The municipality is within the Waldeck-Frankenberg district in a rural region called the upper Eder Valley. The Burgwald range is located east of Allendorf while the Breite Struth hills are in Allendorf's west.

With regard to towns, Allendorf lies to the west of Frankenberg/Eder (12 km) and to the east of Battenberg (2.6 km) and Biedenkopf (21 km). In the north of Allendorf are Hallenberg (12 km), Winterberg (26 km), and Korbach (39 km). In its south is the university city Marburg (32 km).

Allendorf is internationally known because of the heating company Viessmann, which has its headquarters in Allendorf/Eder. Moreover, the FC Ederbergland – an amalgamation of the football divisions of the SV Allendorf and the TSV Battenberg – successfully plays in the Hessian regional league. Allendorf is also attractive to tourists because of its half-timbered houses and the surrounding idyllic landscape.

== Geography ==
=== Neighbouring municipalities ===
Allendorf borders in the east on the town of Frankenberg, in the southeast on the municipality of Burgwald, and in the south and west on the town of Battenberg (all in Waldeck-Frankenberg). To its north is North Rhine-Westphalia (Bad Berleburg and Hallenberg).

=== Constituent municipalities ===
The municipality Allendorf/Eder consists of the following Ortsbezirke:

- Allendorf (first mentioned 1107)
- Battenfeld (first mentioned 778)
- Bromskirchen
- Haine (first mentioned 850)
- Neuludwigsdorf-Dachsloch-Seibelsbach
- Osterfeld (first mentioned 1774)
- Rennertehausen (first mentioned 1274)
- Somplar

== History ==
=== Foundation ===
In 1107, Allendorf had its first documentary mention as Count Kunimund's donation to the Imperial Abbey of Hersfeld. The municipality passed with the Amt of Battenberg first to the High Principality (Oberfürstentum) of Marburg in 1567, and then to Hesse-Darmstadt in 1623. In 1866, it became part of the Prussian district of Battenberg, in 1932 the Frankenberg district, and in 1974 the Waldeck-Frankenberg district. Since Hesse's municipal reforms in 1971, Allendorf (Eder) with the outlying centres of Battenfeld, Rennertehausen, Haine and Osterfeld form a municipality on the broad Eder plains. On 1 January 2023, the former municipality Bromskirchen was merged into Allendorf.

=== Coat of arms ===
The coat of arms of Allendorf consists of two yellow outside-turned crescents over a silver six-pointed star on a blue background. This municipal coat of arms was conferred to Allendorf on 11 April 1967 by the interior ministry of the state Hesse. The adoption of it was recommended by Karl E. Demandt in his certificate from 1 March 1967. This recommendation was based on research done by Carl Knetsch (†1938), director of the municipal archives of Marburg, and by Hans Joachim von Brockhusen, an archivist and librarian.

According to Knetsch and Brockhusen's research, the coat was originally the coat of arms of the lineage "von Allendorf (Aldindorf, Altendorf)," which ceased to exist in the 15th century. However, there has not been found any evidence yet for Knetsch and Brockhusen's conclusion that the municipal coat of arms earlier served as the coat of arms of that family. It remains unclear on which documentary basis Knetsch ascribes this coat of arms to the lineage von Allendorf. A draft of the arms which was found among his notes was probably based on a sandstone made relief which can be found at the church of Battenfeld and which probably dates from the 15th century. The relief is a marshalled coat of arms. On the left side (from the viewer's perspective) there is the coat of arms of the family von Biedenfeld, while on the right side there is the coat of arms that consists of the two half-moons and the star. A heraldic interpretation of this marshalled coat of arms could be that a man of the von Biedenfelds was married to a woman of a family that had the two crescents and the star in their coat of arms. Perhaps Knetsch concluded from a family tree of the von Biedenfelds and their engagement in building operations at the church that this must be the coat of arms of the von Allendorfs.

Norbert Henkel, author of the chronicles of Allendorf, criticises that since the actual coat of arms of the family von Allendorf is not testified in records, the arms found at the church of Battenfeld cannot definitively be ascribed to a family von Allendorf. Therefore, the real origin of the municipal coat of arms remains unknown. According to Henkel, the coat of arms belongs to the family of a woman that married one of the von Biedenfelds. This couple must have been in one way or another engaged in the building or renovation of the church of Battenfeld.

== Politics ==
=== Mayors ===
1821 to 1824	Heinrich Konrad Born I.
1825 to 1831	Johannes Strieder
1831 to 1837	Heinrich Konrad Born I.
1838 to 1850	Johannes Wickenhöfer
1850 to 1862	Heinrich Konrad Born II.
1862 to 1886	Karl Stockhausen
1886 to 1913	Philipp Amend
1913 to 1924	Konrad Amend
1924 to 1939	Christian Huft
1939 to 1945	Heinrich Steber
1945 to 1948	Wilhelm Hess
1948 to 1969	Heinrich Jakobi
1970 to 1999	Robert Amend
since 2000	Claus Junghenn

=== Municipal council ===
Allendorf's council is made up of 31 councillors, with seats apportioned thus, in accordance with municipal elections held on 27 March 2011:

- CDU 11 seats
- SPD 9 seats
- FDP 1 seat
- BLO 10 seats

Note: BLO is citizens' coalition.

==== Constituent municipality heads ====
- Allendorf: Strieder, Reinhold (BLA)
- Battenfeld: Gasse, Dietmar (CDU)
- Rennertehausen: Clemens, Erich
- Haine: Eckel, Günther
- Osterfeld: Lassek, Wolfgang (BLO)

=== Partnerships ===
Allendorf maintains partnership links with:

- Bonneval near Chartres, France, since 1981.

== Sightseeing ==
- The Battenfeld Church is a Romanesque cross-shaped basilica from the 12th and 13th centuries within which are preserved two case bays in the nave and the crossing with groin vaults and a domelike vault in the quire.
- The Allendorf Old Church (Alte Kirche Allendorf) is from late Gothic times and has a bulky quire tower whose flat spire (tented on all sides with a short roof ridge) is set on the long sides with two bay windows, giving it an interesting profile. It was built in 1496.
- Rennertehausen Church is a half-timbered church from 1609 with a loft and interesting pulpit.
- Haine Church is a half-timbered, opulently decorated church. It was built in 1676.
- The Altes Steinbackhaus ("Old Stone Bakehouse") is in Rennertehausen, at Im Wiesenhof 9.
- There are local history museums in outlying centres.
- The Stedefelsen (crags), 200 m downstream from Rennertehausen's Eder weir, are a geological treasure from Zechstein times.
- The Historical Border between Hesse-Darmstadt and Hesse-Kassel (or Hesse-Cassel) runs through the municipal area from north to south. Many border stones – the oldest from 1650 – are preserved and looked after.
- There are many fine half-timbered houses in all centres.

== Infrastructure ==
=== Educational Facilities ===
Allendorf's school has existed since 1965. Before it was renamed "Schule am Goldberg" it was called "Mittelpunktschule Allendorf." It normally accommodates a primary school and a Hauptschule. Lately, however, it has been reduced to being only a primary school because of demographic and educational changes. Its pupils come from Allendorf, Battenfeld, Bromskirchen, Haine, Osterfeld, and Rennertehausen.

Secondary schools can be found in Battenberg and Frankenberg. Battenberg's comprehensive school (Gesamtschule Battenberg) offers all three types of schools (Hauptschule, Realschule, and Gymnasium). It puts a special emphasis on media education. As it is newly refurbished, it is a well-equipped all-day school. Pupils who go to Gymnasium in Battenberg have to change to Frankenberg after their tenth grade in order to pass their A-levels. Frankenberg's Edertalschule is a traditional Gymnasium with a special emphasis put on musical education. There is also a vocational college (Berufsfachschule) called "Hans-Viessmann-Schule" in Frankenberg.

=== Sports Grounds ===
Allendorf and its constituent municipalities offer a broad variety of well-equipped public sports grounds, which are regularly used by local clubs and schools. The largest sports ground is the stadium in Allendorf, which is called "Sportstadion im Ried." It is an arena type B and consists of 6 running tracks with Rekortan-surface, a sandpit for long jump, a high jump or pole vault pit, a lawn, and a shot put area. Unroofed standing terraces for approximately 6000 people can be found on the south-western side of the arena.

In addition to the football ground of the stadium, there are four separate football grounds and one artificial grass pitch, which reflects that almost every constituent municipality has its own football association and that FC Ederbergland regularly exercises on one of the football grounds in Allendorf's sports centre.

Apart from football grounds and athletics sports stadiums, there are also a boules pit, an ice rink which is used as a skateboard park in summer, an indoor riding hall surrounded by several outdoor riding arenas, an indoor tennis centre with three hard courts as well as four outdoor tennis courts. Three additional tennis courts can be found in Rennertehausen.

Further sports grounds are a gymnasium belonging to the local school, two bowling facilities in Allendorf and Haine with two bowling alleys each, three indoor shooting ranges and one outdoor shooting stand. Finally, one can also consider the airport as a sports ground since it is regularly used by the aviation sport association.

=== Municipality Halls ===
Municipal authorities and administration are housed in the municipality centre in Allendorf. Moreover, each village belonging to Allendorf has its own municipality hall which is used for municipality meetings, private parties, sports and cultural events. The municipality halls in Haine and the municipality centre in Allendorf are equipped with two skittle alleys, which can be rented.

=== Transport ===
==== Streets ====
Near Allendorf two major roads, B236 and B253, meet. The B236 runs along a north–south axis connecting Allendorf with Winterberg and Marburg. The well-developed B253 connects Allendorf with Frankenberg, Korbach, and Biedenkopf. To reach the nearest autobahn, which is the A45 near Dillenburg, it takes approximately one hour (50,4 km). The B3, a two-laned major road that is connected with the autobahn network, can be reached in approximately half an hour after 25,9 km near Marburg.

In addition to these long distances to clearways, the traffic situation is impaired by frequent radar controls and speed limits on B236 between Münchhausen and Marburg as well as sloping and winding roads on B253 when passing the Sackpfeife.

==== Railways ====
Allendorf is associated with the railway network and has its own railway station. Since 14 November 1966 passenger service on the local railway between Winterberg and Frankenberg has been discontinued. The track was largely converted into a walking and bicycle trail. On 30 May 1981, the railway line Frankenberg – Bad Berleburg was likewise closed for passenger service. The track is now used only for goods transport. Today, Allendorf is not served by trains any more. The nearest railway stations on the railway line Marburg – Frankenberg are Münchhausen, Birkenbringhausen and Frankenberg.

==== Airports ====
Allendorf has a small airport (Allendorf Airport), which is run by the heating company Viessmann and shared with the local aviation sports club. The paved runway is 1240m long and illuminated at night. There are no scheduled or charter flights. Frankfurt Main Airport, Paderborn Airport and Düsseldorf Airport are the nearest airports with regular passenger flights.

== Clubs and associations ==
=== Volunteer fire brigades in the municipality ===
- FFW Allendorf (1927)
- FFW Rennertehausen (1931)
- FFW Battenfeld (1930)
- FFW Haine (1960)

=== Sport clubs ===
- Sportverein 1924 Allendorf (Eder) e. V.
- SV 1923 Rennertehausen e.V.
- SG Battenfeld e.V.
- TSV Haine e.V.
- Türkgüçü Allendorf
- FC Ederbergland

=== Shooting clubs ===
- Schützenverein Allendorf (Eder)
- Schützenverein 1930 e.V. Rennertehausen

=== Youth clubs ===
- Jugendclub Allendorf (Eder)
- Jugendclub Rennertehausen
- Jugendclub Battenfeld

=== German Red Cross ===
- DRK Ortsgruppe Allendorf

=== Ars Scribendi ===
- Branch office of the international body for furthering literary and writing arts, Ars Scribendi
