= Hatzfeld =

- Town
- Flag Coat of arms

- Location of Hatzfeld within Waldeck-Frankenberg district
- Interactive map of Hatzfeld
- Location within Germany Location within Hesse
- Coordinates: 51°0′N 8°33′E
- Country: Germany
- State: Hesse
- Admin. region: Kassel
- District: Waldeck-Frankenberg
- Subdivisions: 6 Stadtbezirke

Government
  - Mayor (2018–24): Dirk Junker

Area
  - Total: 58.51 km^{2} (22.59 sq mi)
- Elevation: 330–430 m (1,080–1,410 ft)

Population (2025-12-31)
  - Total: 2,838
  - Density: 48.50/km^{2} (125.6/sq mi)
- Time zone: UTC+01:00 (CET)
  - Summer (DST): UTC+02:00 (CEST)
- Postal codes: 35116
- Dialling codes: 06467
- Vehicle registration: KB
- Website: www.hatzfeld-eder.de

Hatzfeld (Eder) (German pronunciation: [ˈhatsfɛlt]) is a small town in Waldeck-Frankenberg district in Hesse, Germany.

== Geography ==
=== Location ===
Hatzfeld lies in west Hesse 25 km northwest of Marburg and north of the Sackpfeife (674 m-high mountain) in the valley of the Eder.

=== Neighbouring municipalities ===
Hatzfeld borders in the north and east on the town of Battenberg (Waldeck-Frankenberg), in the south on the town of Biedenkopf (Marburg-Biedenkopf), and in the west on the town of Bad Berleburg (Siegen-Wittgenstein in North Rhine-Westphalia).

=== Constituent municipalities ===
The town of Hatzfeld consists of the centres of Biebighausen, Eifa, Hatzfeld (main town), Holzhausen, Lindenhof and Reddighausen

== History ==
Hatzfeld had its first documentary mention in 1138. In 1340, the municipality was granted town rights. After the Hatzfeld branch of the House of Hatzfeld died out in 1570, half of the town, and later the whole, passed to the County of Hesse. In 1866, Hatzfeld passed to Prussia, and under Prussian law lost its town rights in 1885. After Prussia was dissolved, Hatzfeld once again became a town in 1950.

=== Reddighausen ===
Reddighausen, nowadays one of Hatzfeld's constituent municipalities, had its first documentary mention in 1278, at that time still under the name Redinchusen. Already by 1840 Reddighausen had 474 inhabitants; nowadays (as of 2000) there are roughly 900.

=== Lindenhof ===
Lindenhof is a hamlet and one of Hatzfeld's constituent municipalities. Its name, unlike what might be assumed, has nothing to do with linden trees, even though there is a "namesake" tree growing in the municipality ("Linden" is Linde – plural, Linden – in German), but rather with linen (Leinen), which in earlier times was woven here. In 1993, Lindenhof celebrated 300 years of existence, even though various sources point to a greater age.

What is known is that in 1693, a Hatzfeld townsman named Eckhardt went into the lovely dale here and acquired a newly built agricultural estate. In 1712, there were already six households in Lindenhof. In 1892, the hamlet got its own schoolteacher, who taught in a private house. In 1895, there were 77 people living in Lindenhof. In 1939, Lindenhof got its own school, which lasted until 1965 when its functions were transferred to a new central school in Hatzfeld.

By the beginning of the First World War, 21 residential buildings had appeared in the dale, although some of them were in the separate hamlet of Hof Roda.

In 1991-1992, what is arguably Hesse's smallest half-timbered church was consecrated in Lindenhof.

=== Photograph gallery ===
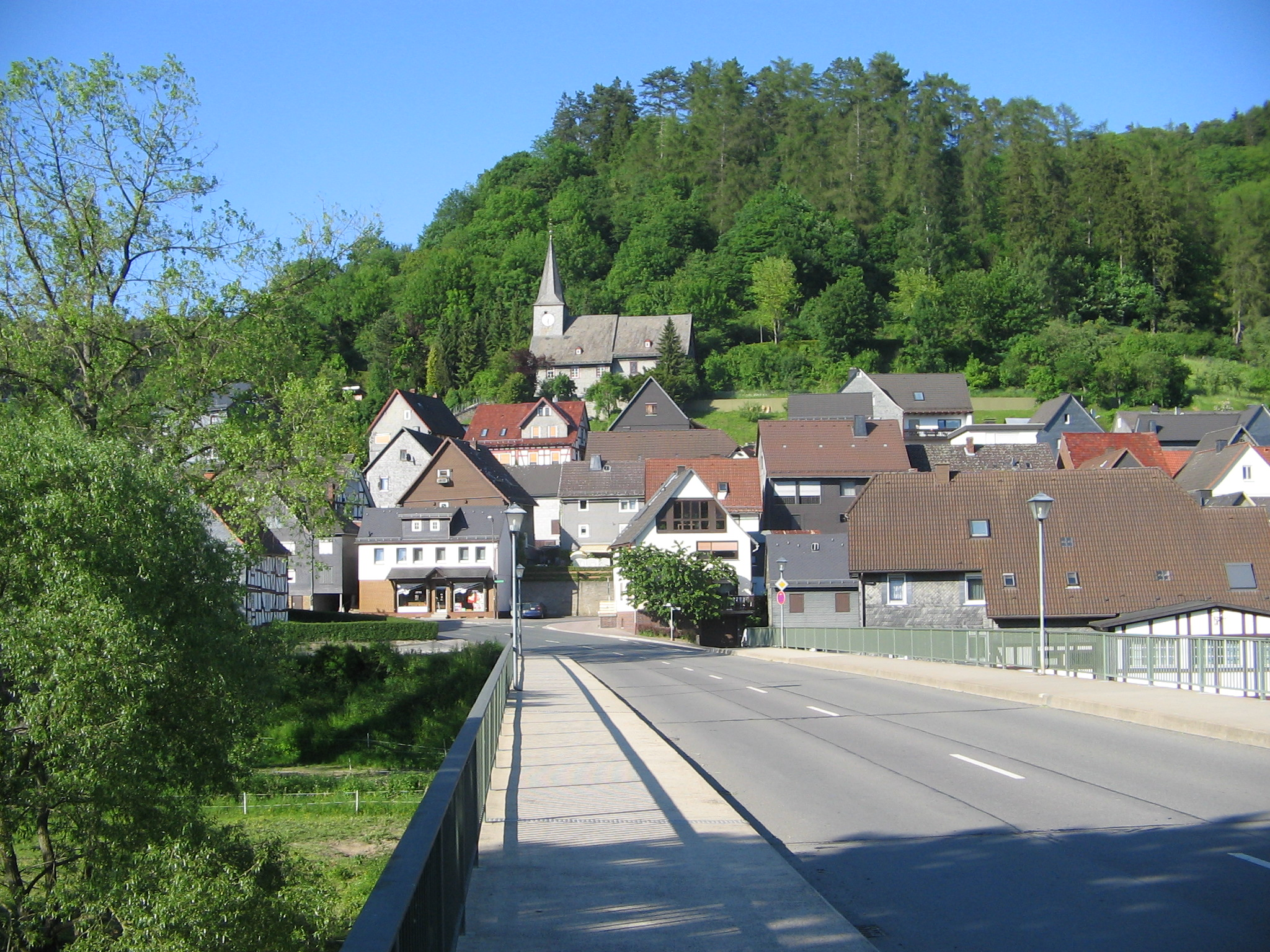
Hatzfeld summer 2006

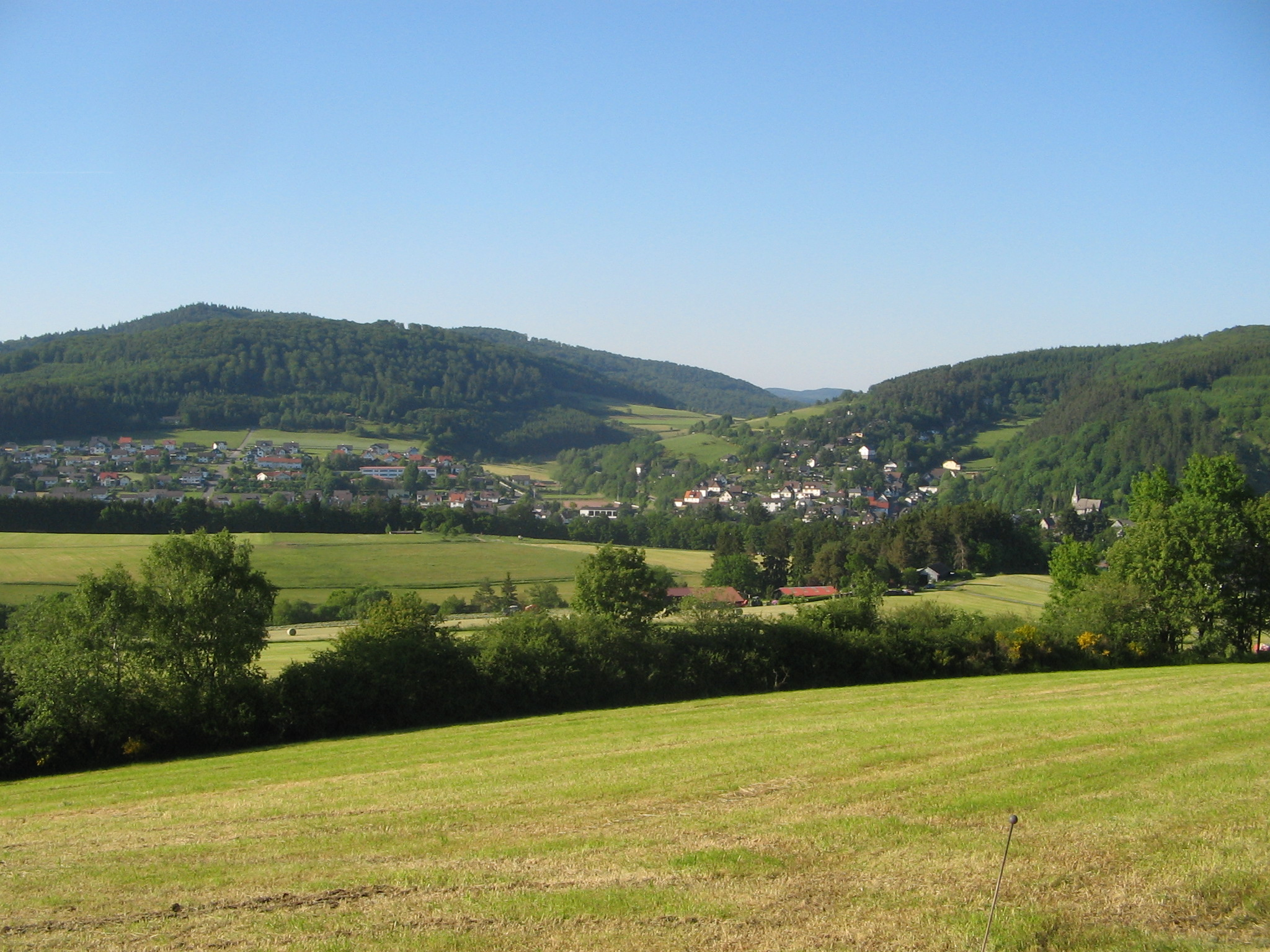
View over Hatzfeld

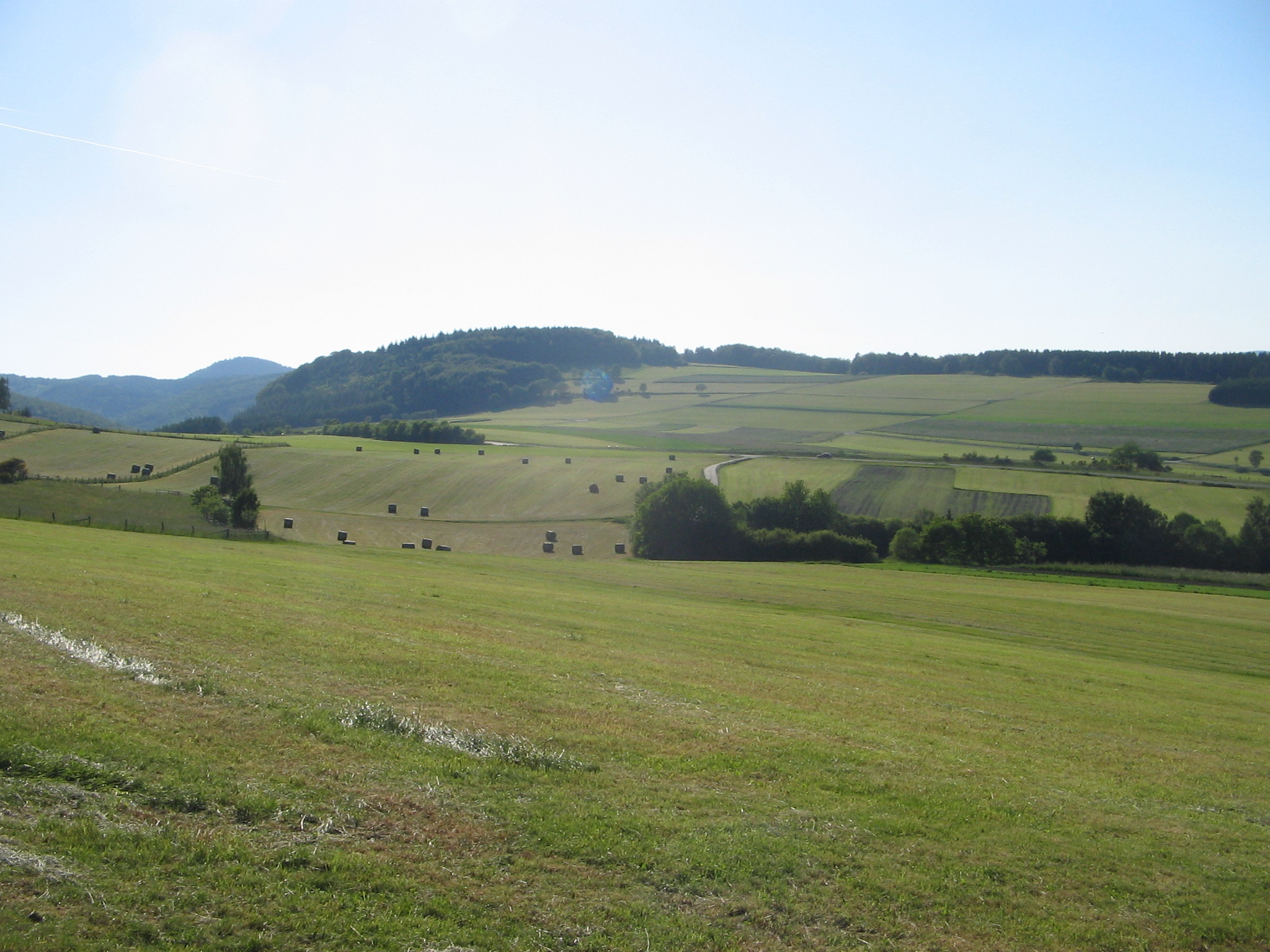
View over the "Ahlefeld"

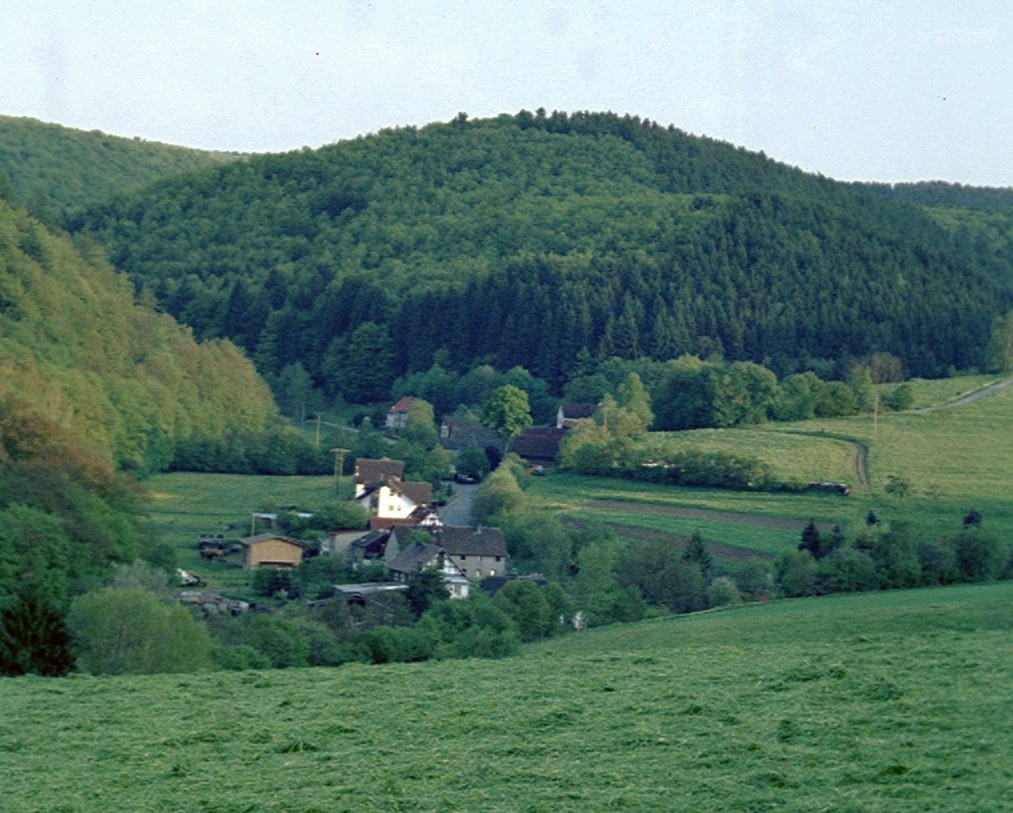
Lindenhof 2005

Old Lindenhof school ca. 1940

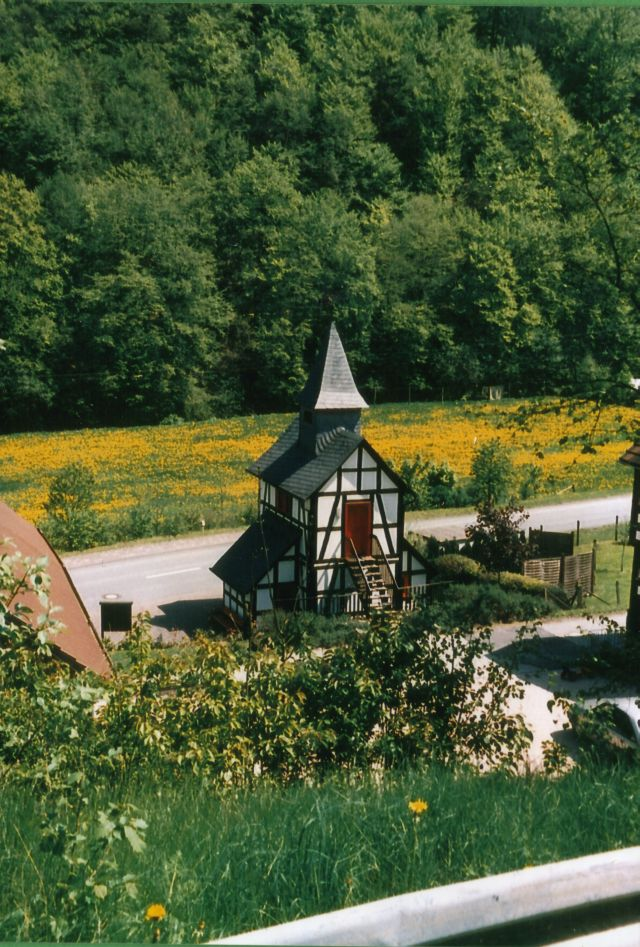
Lindenhof Church

== Politics ==
=== Town council ===
The town council's 23 seats are apportioned thus, in accordance with municipal elections held on 26 March 2006:

Bürgerliste Reddighausen	6 seats
SPD	4 seats
CDU	3 seats
Bürgerliste Holzhausen	3 seats
Bürgerliste Hatzfeld	3 seats
Bürgerliste Eifa	2 seats
FDP	2 seats

Note: The Bürgerlisten are "citizens' lists" rather than actual parties.

=== Coat of arms ===
The current civic coat of arms was conferred in 1950, but the charges shown within it date back to the 14th century, from which time an old town seal is known. The arms show a town wall with a gateway flanked by towers. Also in the arms above the gateway is an inescutcheon showing the arms of the Lords (later also Counts and Princes) of Hatzfeld, who died out in 1570. The size and shape of the various charges in the arms have changed over the ages.

=== Town partnerships ===
Hatzfeld maintains partnership links with the following:

- Cloyes-sur-le-Loir, département of Eure-et-Loir, France since 1979

== Sport and leisure ==
Tourism plays an important rôle in Reddighausen, which is a state-recognized resort with a comprehensive network of hiking trails. There is also a combination woodlore and bird-protection path in Hatzfeld (main town), and at the Sackpfeife are found a winter sport centre, and also a summer toboggan run.

In Lindenhof is a wildfowl haven run by the Naturschutzbund Deutschland, a non-governmental organization dedicated to nature conservation.

== Churches ==
- Evangelical-Lutheran Church

== Literature ==
- H. Reimer: Historisches Ortslexikon für Kurhessen; Marburg: Elwert, 1974; ISBN 3-7708-0509-7; S.304
