= Bromskirchen =

- Borough of Allendorf (Eder)
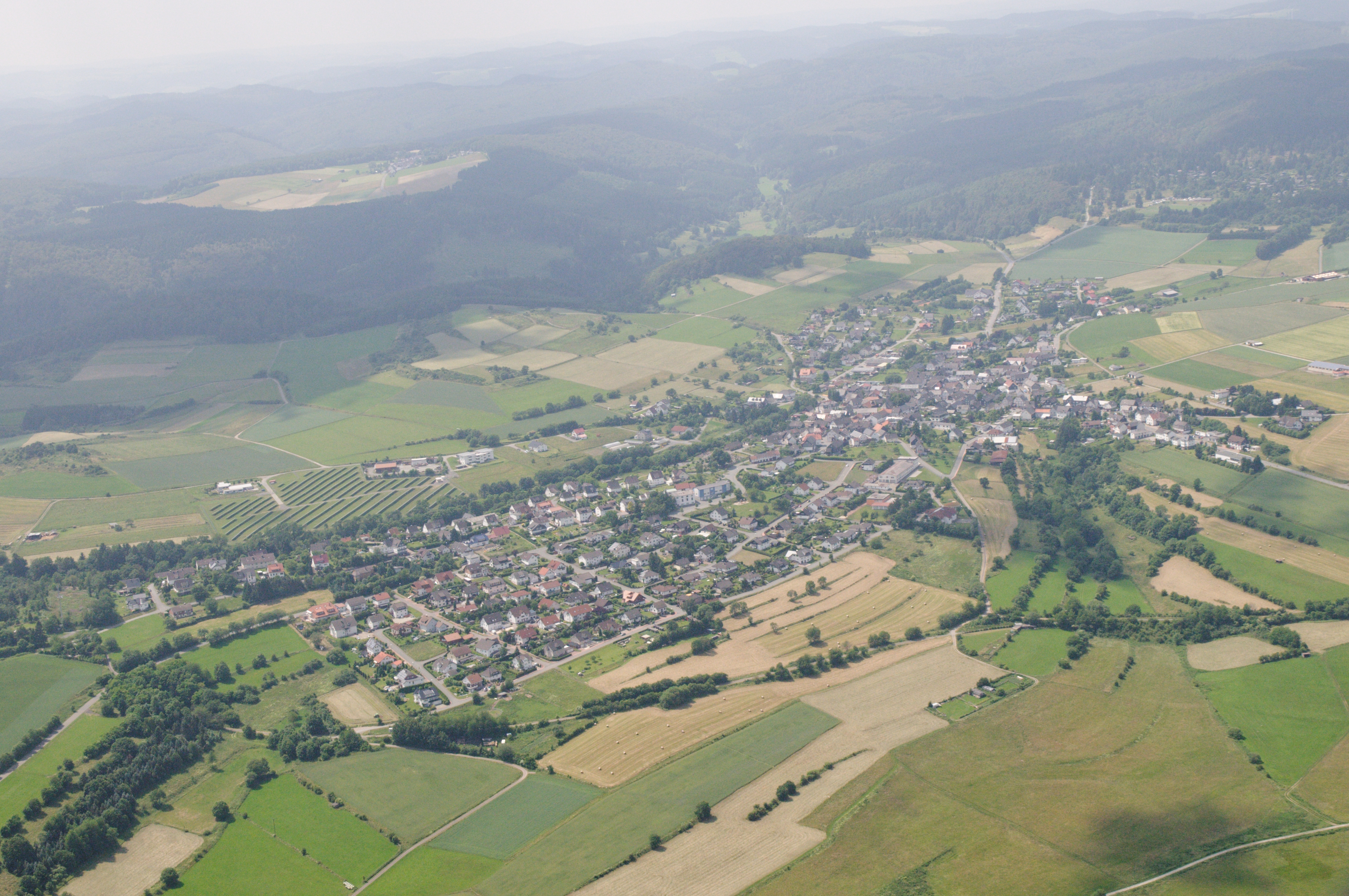
- Aerial photograph (2013)

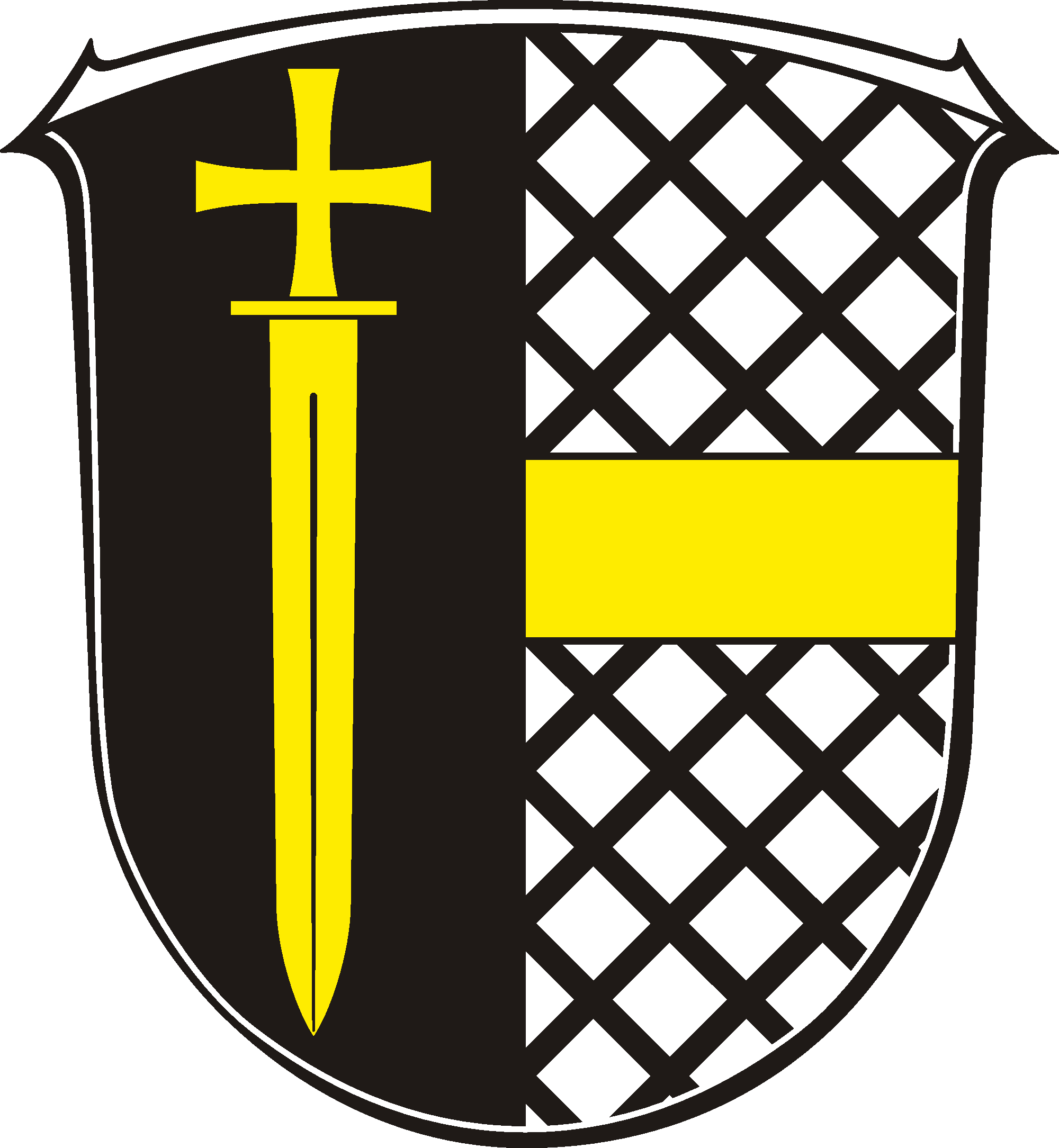
- Coat of arms
- Interactive map of Bromskirchen
- Location within Germany Location within Hesse
- Coordinates: 50°58′N 08°52′E
- Country: Germany
- State: Hesse
- Admin. region: Kassel
- District: Waldeck-Frankenberg
- Municipality: Allendorf (Eder)
- Subdivisions: 5 Ortsteile

Area
  - Total: 35.23 km^{2} (13.60 sq mi)
- Elevation: 414 m (1,358 ft)

Population (2021-12-31)
  - Total: 1,917
  - Density: 54.41/km^{2} (140.9/sq mi)
- Time zone: UTC+01:00 (CET)
  - Summer (DST): UTC+02:00 (CEST)
- Postal codes: 59969
- Dialling codes: 02984
- Vehicle registration: KB
- Website: www.bromskirchen.de

Bromskirchen is a village and a former municipality in Waldeck-Frankenberg in Hesse, Germany. On 1 January 2023, it was merged into the municipality of Allendorf (Eder).

== Geography ==
=== Location ===
Bromskirchen lies at the edge of the Rothaargebirge in southwest Waldeck-Frankenberg, right on the boundary with North Rhine-Westphalia's district of Hochsauerlandkreis.

More than 70% of the community's area is wooded.

=== Neighbouring communities ===
Bromskirchen borders in the north on the town of Hallenberg (Hochsauerlandkreis in North Rhine-Westphalia), in the east on the town of Frankenberg, in the south on the community of Allendorf and the town of Battenberg (all three in Waldeck-Frankenberg), and in the west on the town of Bad Berleburg (Siegen-Wittgenstein in North Rhine-Westphalia).

=== Constituent communities ===
- Bromskirchen
- Dachsloch
- Neuludwigsdorf
- Seibelsbach
- Somplar

== History ==
Bromskirchen had its first documentary mention in 1238 in an account from the Archbishopric of Mainz. After the Thirty Years' War, the village passed to Hesse-Darmstadt, and in 1866 to Prussia.

For centuries, the village's livelihood was based on agriculture on scant land, and the forest.

=== Population development ===
Year	1990	1991	1992	1993	1994	1995	1996	1997	1998	1999	2000	2001	2002	2003	2020
Inhabitants	1,852	1,868	1,896	1,895	1,858	1,879	1,895	1,920	1,913	1,952	1,961	1,958	1,940	1,916	1,905

=== Coat of arms ===
Bromskirchen's civic coat of arms might heraldically be described thus: Party per pale, dexter in sable a sword Or with hilt per cross pattée Or, sinister in argent a lattice per lozengy sable, thereover a fess Or.

These arms were conferred on 12 November 1982. The sword stands for the local patron saint, Saint Martin of Tours, who is actually depicted in some Hessian civic coats of arms (see Amöneburg and Neustadt (Hesse)). The cross stands for the church, thereby making it a canting element for the —kirchen name ending (which means "church"). The other half of the arms comes from those borne by the Lords of Winter, the local rulers from the 15th to 18th century. The black and silver (or white, or indeed grey, as it appears in this article) were the old County of Battenberg colours.

=== Partnerships ===
Bromskirchen maintains partnership links with:

- Arrou, département of Eure-et-Loir, France, since 1978

== Culture and sightseeing ==
Bromskirchen's town hall was built between 1619 and 1621. It is a half-timbered house with ornamental carvings.

== Economy and infrastructure ==
Bromskirchen is an economic centre and offers more than 900 jobs in its working trades, the greatest share of which is held by the firm Hoppe AG, a leading manufacturer of door and window fittings.
