= Altastenberg =

Village in North Rhine-Westphalia, Germany

Coordinates: 51°11.39166′N 8°27.9417′E

Altastenberg is a village in the borough of Winterberg in North Rhine-Westphalia, Germany. It is a state-recognised spa, is classed as one of the mountain villages in the borough and, at just under 800 m. above NN, is also the highest village in the Sauerland.

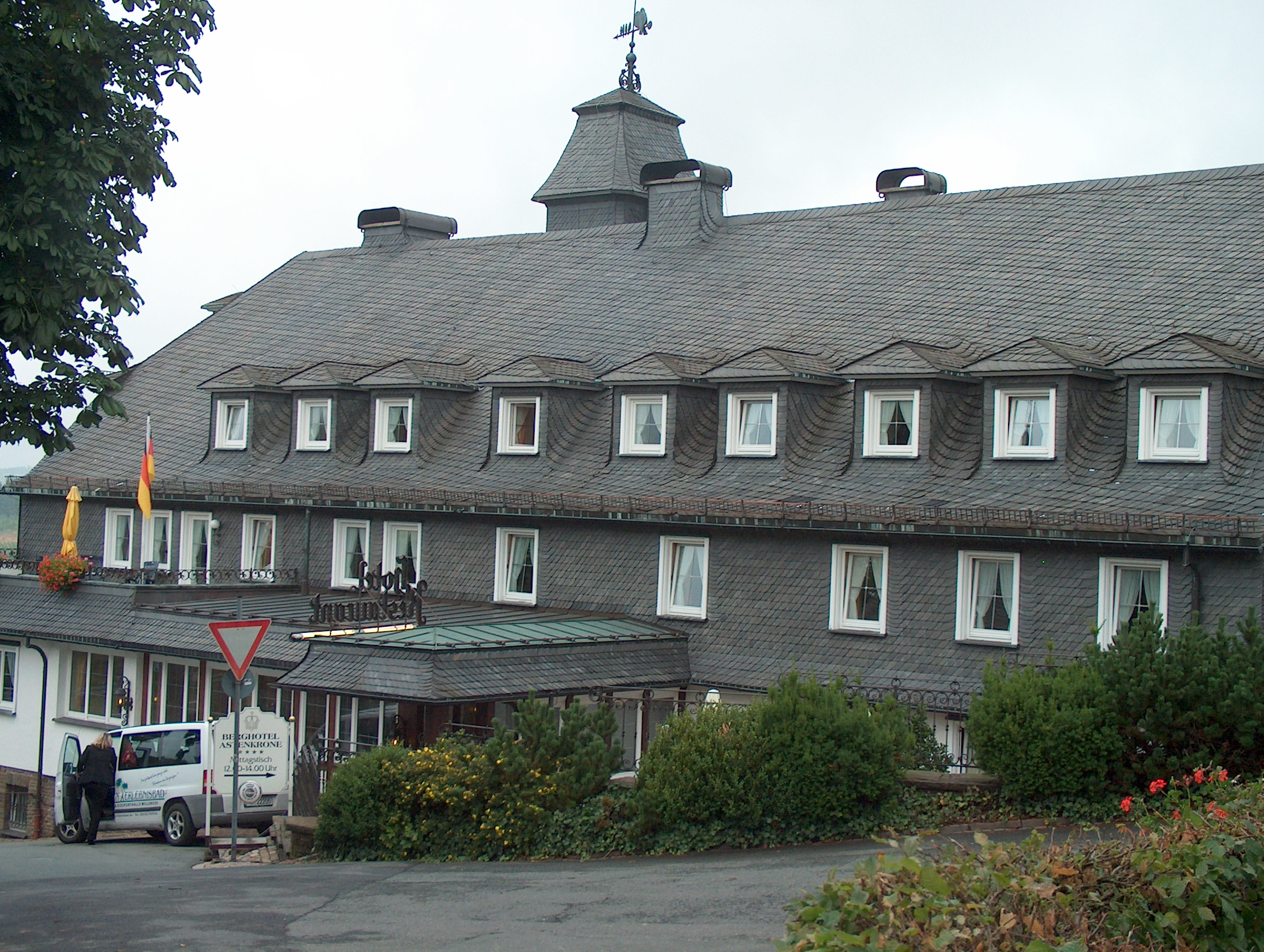
The Astenkrone mountain hotel in Altastenberg.

== Geography ==
Altastenberg lies in the Hochsauerland district about 2 km northwest of the Kahler Asten (841,9 m) and only a little west of the Bremberg (809 m), about 5 km (as the crow flies) west of Winterberg and between the sources and upper reaches of the river Lenne to the south and the Neger to the northwest. It is located near the crest of the Rothaargebirge mountain range, along which part of the Rhine-Weser watershed runs.

== History ==
The village, originally called Lichtenscheid according to early descriptions of land ownership, was established around 1540 by Johann von Hanxleden, when he settled charcoal burners and herdsmen there. This resulted in conflict with the townsfolk of Winterberg who had a claim to the land. Right up to the end of the Electorate of Cologne, which ruled the region, the Count of Waldeck claimed the right at least to levy taxes in the Lichtenscheid area, if not to rule it directly, because he had rented the land to Hanxleden. Around 1600 the village fell within the jurisdiction of the court at Oberkirchen, whose presiding judge was Kaspar von Fürstenberg at that time. Around 1563 the village probably had three farms. This number steadily increased to six in 1600, ten in 1630 and fourteen in 1720. In 1630 four witches were prosecuted and executed by burning.

Up to 1785 the village was within the parish of Winterberg St James (St. Jakobus). Their dead were buried in the churchyard of the Winterberg parish church. In 1729 it is noted in the parish records of Winterberg St James that every farmer had to provide a sled load of wood to the vicar annually. On delivery they would receive a mug of beer, a little bread and butter and hay for the horses. Since the 18th century there had only been a chapel at Altastenberg until a new church was built in 1971/72.

From the 18th century the village was called Altastenberg ("Old Astenberg") to distinguish it from a newly established village south of the Kahler Asten which was named Neuastenberg ("New Astenberg").

The early inhabitants of the Altastenberg were herdsmen, charcoal burners and cart drivers. The manufacture and sale of wooden articles for itinerant tradesmen and work in the slate mines in the neighbouring village of Nordenau offered modest secondary income for the poor farmers.

== Tourism ==
Today tourism is the main source of income in Altastenberg. The village is well known for its winter sport facilities. It is only a few hundred metres to the nearby skiing complex known as the Skiliftkarussell Winterberg. Immediately at the entrance to the village there are ski lifts, a langlauf trail (Loipe) and a ski jump (the Westfalenschanze). The so-called Sahnehang slopes are used in winter by skiers, snowboarders and tobogganists. In summer, too, the village is popular because it offers other sport and leisure facilities. The surrounding area is ideal for walking and hiking. Altastenberg lies on the Rothaarsteig long-distance hiking trail which runs over the Kahler Asten. There is also a one kilometre-long mountain bike arena for cyclists which has routes with various degrees of difficulty.

== Politics ==
Parish council chairman since 2007: Jörg Burmann (SPD), Local history curator: Hermann Pfennig (CDU)

== Sources ==
- Klaus Hamper: Winterberg Hochsauerland. Landschaft Geschichte Brauchtum, Winterberg (ca. 1967).
- Elisabeth Hanschmidt/Paul Aust: Winterberg mit den Dörfern am Kahlen Asten, Münster 1992.
- Alfred Bruns: Die Oberkirchener Hexenprotokolle, in: Hexen – Gerichtsbarkeit im kurkönischen Sauerland, Schmallenberg-Holthausen 1984.
