= Neuastenberg =

Coordinates: 51°9′38″N 8°28′59″E

Neuastenberg is a village in the borough of Winterberg in North Rhine-Westphalia, Germany.

With about 560 inhabitants it is the largest mountain village in the borough.

== Geography and history ==
Neuastenberg lies at a height of 690 to 790 m on the crest of the Rothaargebirge mountain range in Hochsauerland district. It is located on the southern slopes of the Kahler Asten, about 6 kilometres southwest of Winterberg and between the upper reaches of the river Lenne to the north and the Odeborn to the south.

The history of the village goes back to the 18th century and is closely linked to the history of Winterberg and Bad Berleburg.

== Tourism ==
Neuastenberg is especially well known for its winter sport facilities - the Postwiesen ski region, the Biathlon stadium of the Neuastenberg-Langewiese Sports Club and the indoor go-cart track at the Dorint Hotel. In addition there has been a private initiative in Neuastenberg to establish the West German Winter Sport Museum, completed with an attached restaurant.
