= Bremberg (Rothaar) =

Mountain in North Rhine-Westphalia, Germany

- Location within North Rhine-Westphalia

Highest point
- Elevation: 810 m above sea level (NN) (2,657.5 ft)
- Coordinates: 51°11′22″N 8°29′43″E

Geography
- Location: Sauerland, North Rhine-Westphalia, Germany
- Parent range: Rothaargebirge

The Bremberg is a mountain, 809 m above sea level (NN) high, in the Rothaar Mountains range in the district of Hochsauerland, in North Rhine-Westphalia, Germany.

The mountain lies just under 3 km west-southwest of the ski resort of Winterberg, about 1 km west-southwest of the Poppenberg (745.5 m) and around 1.3 km (as the crow flies) north-northeast of the Kahler Asten (841.9 m). Part of the Rhine-Weser watershed runs over the Bremberg.

On and around the Bremberg is part of the ski area known as the Skiliftkarussell Winterberg with langlauf trails (Loipen), a langlauf stadium, which often hosts international competitions, ski lifts and their associated pistes and, on the eastern spur of the mountain, a toboggan run and a small ski jump.

== See also ==
- List of mountains and hills in North Rhine-Westphalia
