= Westfeld (Schmallenberg) =

- Stadtteil of Schmallenberg
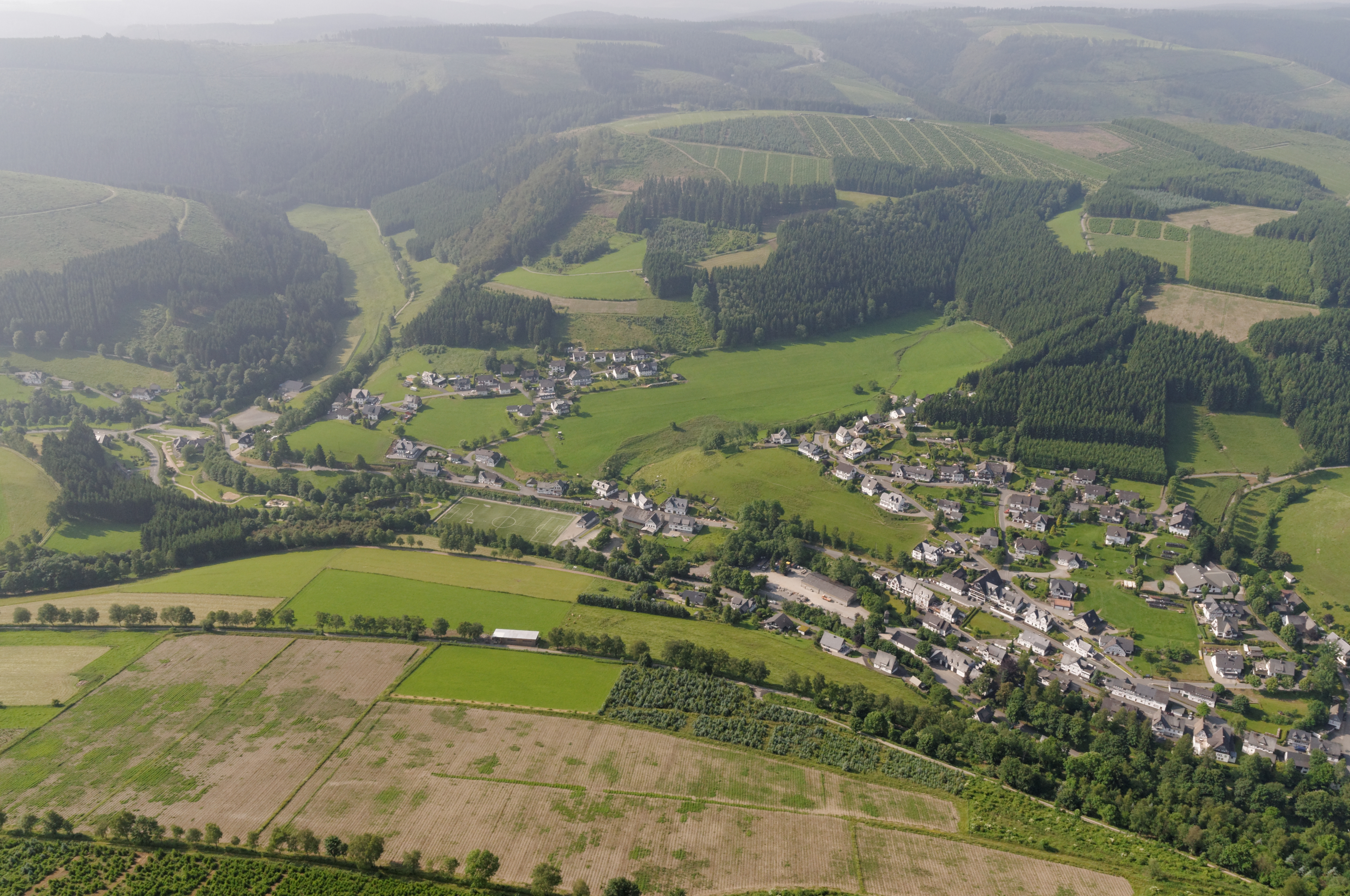

- Flag
- Interactive map of Westfeld
- Location within Germany Location within North Rhine-Westphalia
- Coordinates: 51°9′43″N 8°24′54″E
- Country: Germany
- State: North Rhine-Westphalia
- Admin. region: Arnsberg
- District: Hochsauerlandkreis
- Town: Schmallenberg

Population (2021-12-31)
  - Total: 734
- Time zone: UTC+01:00 (CET)
  - Summer (DST): UTC+02:00 (CEST)

Westfeld is a locality in the municipality Schmallenberg in the High Sauerland District in North Rhine-Westphalia, Germany.

The village has 725 inhabitants and lies in the east of the municipality of Schmallenberg at a height of around 487 m. The river Lenne flows through the village. Westfeld borders on the villages of Ohlenbach, Hoher Knochen, Inderlenne, Lengenbeck, Nordenau and Altastenberg.

The first written document mentioning Wederichvelden dates from 1072 in a charter from Grafschaft Abbey of bishop Anno of Cologne. The village used to belong to the municipality of Oberkirchen in Amt Schmallenberg until the end of 1974.

== Gallery ==
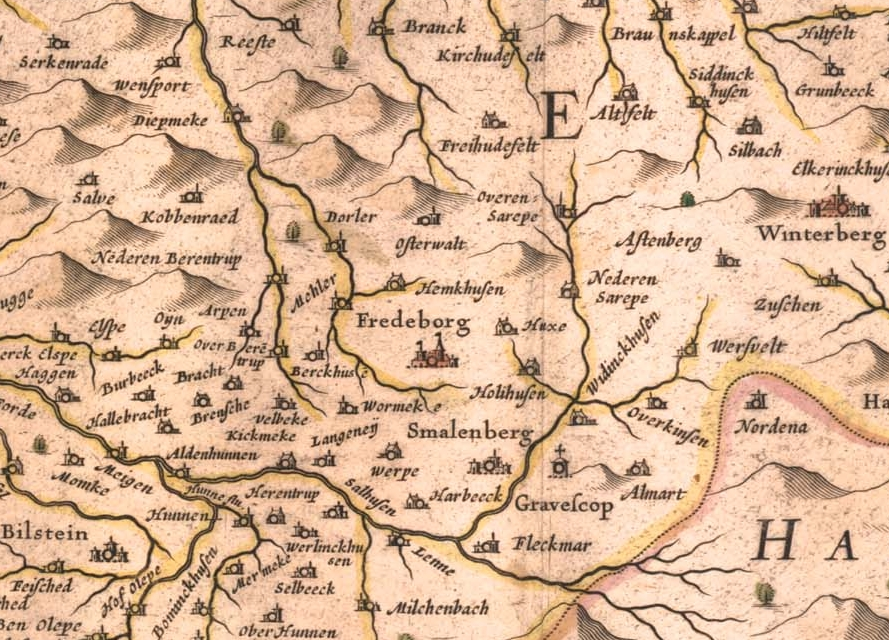
„Wersvelt“ 1645 - Westphalia Ducatus (Duchy of Westphalia)

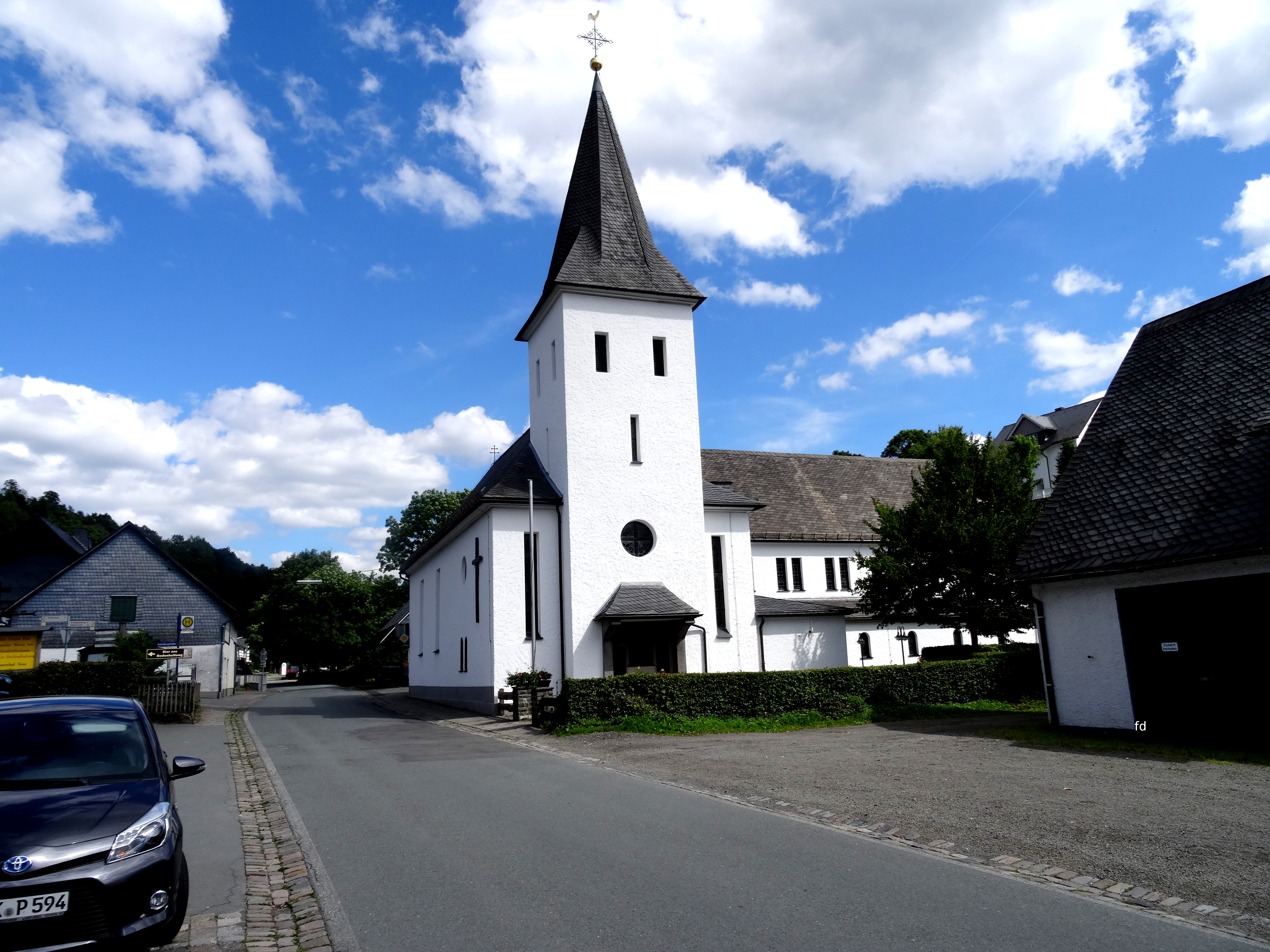
Saint Blaise Church
