= Sindernbach =

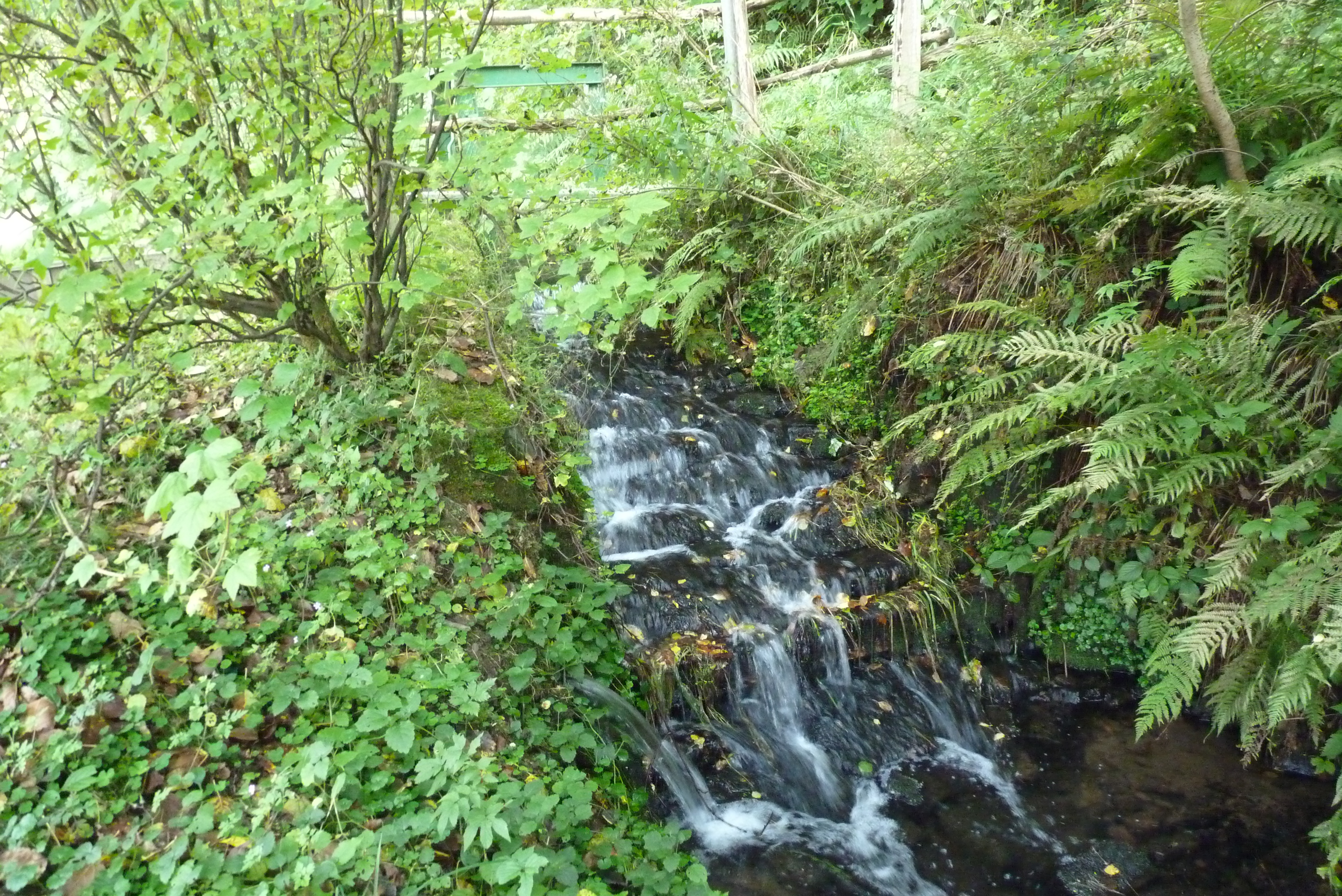

Location
- Country: Germany
- State: North Rhine-Westphalia

Physical characteristics
- Source
  - location: on the east of the Mountain Lahnkopf, Rothaar Mountains
  - elevation: 570 m (1,870 ft)
- Mouth
  - location: in the village Nenkersdorf in the Sieg
  - coordinates: 50.8959°N 8.1948°E
  - elevation: 365 m (1,198 ft)
- Length: 3.58 km (2.22 mi)
- Basin size: 3.471 km^{2} (1.340 sq mi)

Basin features
- Progression: Sieg→ Rhine→ North Sea
- Tributaries
  - left: Nickseifen, Birkenborn
  - right: Butzbach

Sindernbach (German pronunciation: [ˈzɪndɐnbax]) is a river of North Rhine-Westphalia, Germany, which is 3.58 kilometers in length. It has its source on the east of the mountain Lahnkopf in the Rothaar Mountains in an elevation of 570 meters, and it flows into the river Sieg in the village of Nenkersdorf in an elevation of 365 meters above sea level.

== See also ==
- List of rivers of North Rhine-Westphalia
