= Skiliftkarussell Winterberg =

Ski resort in North Rhine-Westphalia, Germany

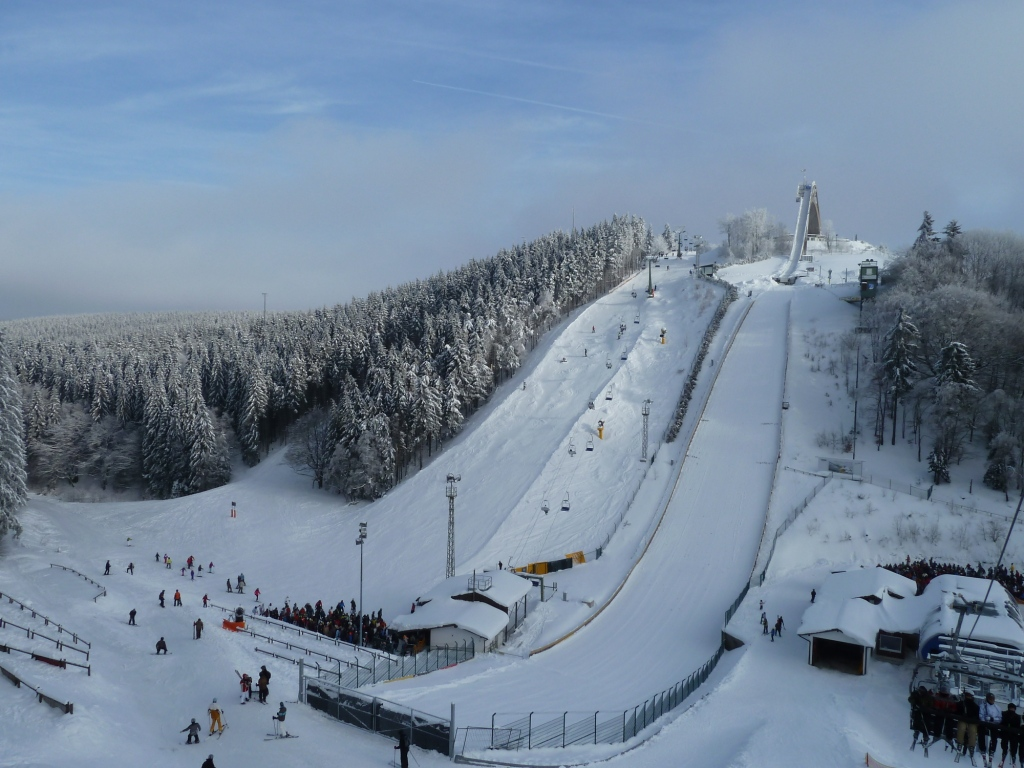
Skiliftkarussell Winterberg

Skiliftkarussell Winterberg is one of the major ski resorts in central Germany. It is located near the town of Winterberg in the Hochsauerland region in North Rhine-Westphalia. As an international destination, popular especially with skiers from the Netherlands, it attracts nearly 900,000 visitors annually. Nearby ski resorts are Altastenberg, Postwiese and Willingen.

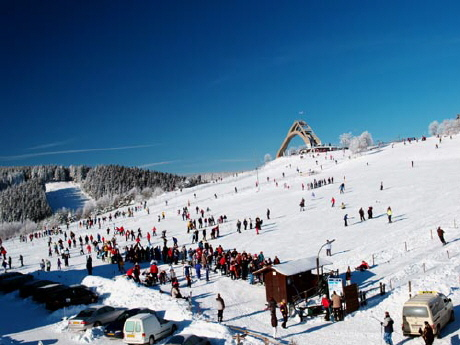
Herrloh hill

== Description ==
Skiliftkarussell Winterberg is located in a forested low mountain range called Rothaargebirge, approx. 120 km N of Frankfurt, 70 km W of Kassel and 110 km E of Cologne. The highest points are Kahler Asten ( 842 m above sea level (NN)), Bremberg (809 m), Kappe (776 m), Poppenberg (746 m) and Herrloh (733 m).

The ski resort offers 25 ski lifts:

- 2 eight-person detachable chairlifts,
- 6 six-person detachable chairlifts,
- 4 four-person chairlifts,
- 1 double chairlift,
- 7 T-Bar-lifts,
- 4 carpet lifts and
- 2 toboggan lifts (1 chairlift is also used for both skiing and toboggan)

The network of ski slopes adds up to a length of 23 km and consists mainly of easy and intermediate ski runs. The steepest ski run is the FIS slalom run at Kappe, featuring the greatest vertical drop of 190 metres. Snowmaking was increasingly set up since the 1990s, to ensure snow safety, today it covers 95% of the slopes. The ski resort also offers night skiing on Wednesdays, Fridays and Saturdays. the resort usually opens up in December and closes by the end of March.

== Summer ==
In summer, the ski resort offers a terrain park for downhill biking. The chair lift at Kappe operates to carry cyclists uphill. At Poppenberg, there are also several mountainboarding cross-country runs.

== Additional facilities ==
In addition to the skiing slopes, there are numerous trails for Cross-country skiing in the vicinity of Winterberg. The Winterberg bobsled track at Kappe is a regular venue for international competitions in bobsleigh, sledding and Skeleton. In Germany, it is also known for hosting the wok racing event, invented by the German TV entertainer Stefan Raab. The St. George ski jump is a landmark of Winterberg, and used to be the venue for German Championships in the Nordic combined sport. Today it is used as a training facility by the local ski club.

== See also ==
- List of ski resorts in the German Central Uplands
