= Sauerland =

Rural, hilly area in North Rhine-Westphalia, Germany

Coordinates: 51.2500°N 8.0000°E

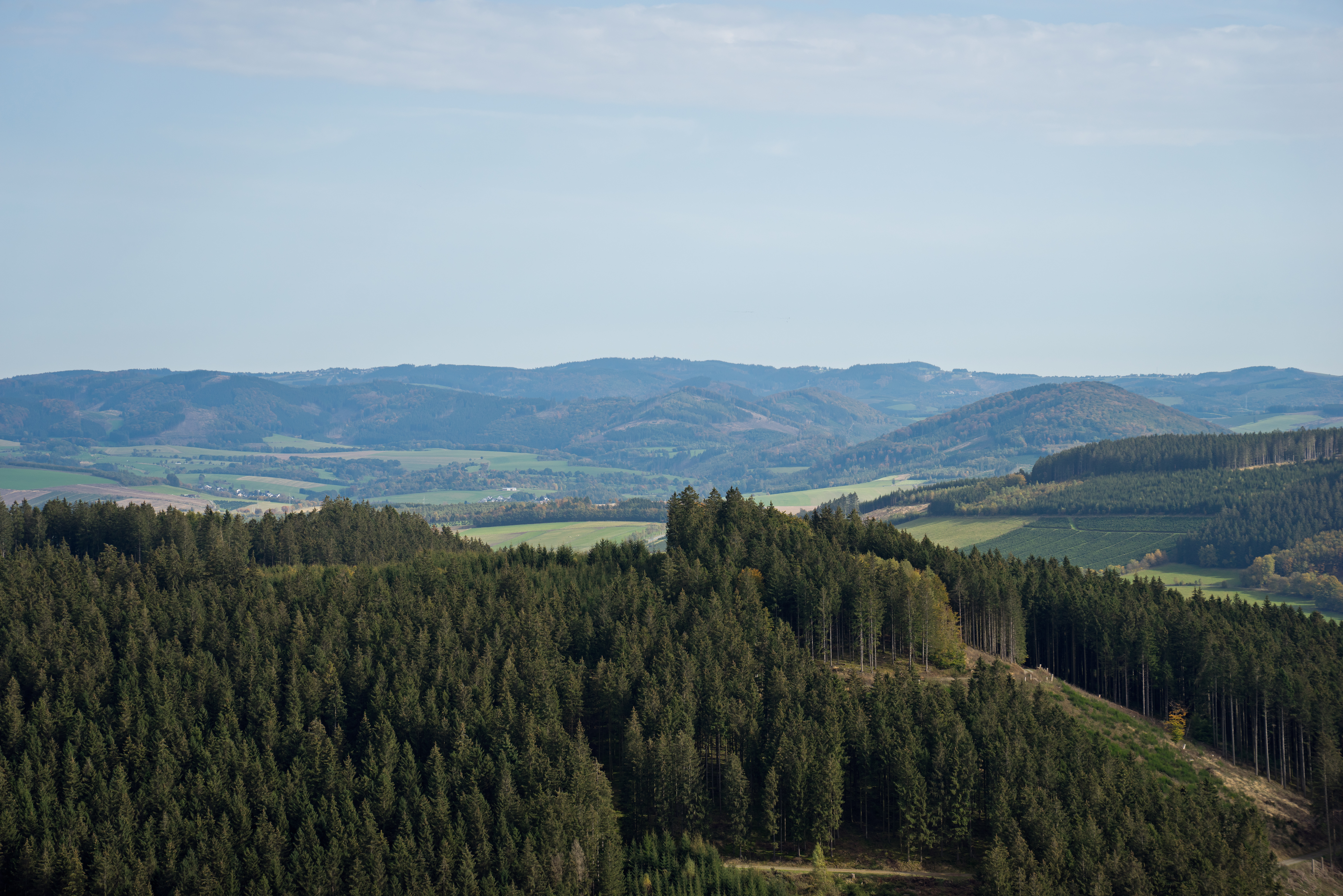
Hills of the Sauerland

Sauerland, North Rhine-Westphalia, Germany

The Sauerland (German: [ˈzaʊɐlant]) is a rural, hilly area spreading across most of the southeastern part of the German federal state of North Rhine-Westphalia and a small northwestern part of Hesse, in parts heavily forested and, apart from the major valleys, sparsely inhabited.

The Sauerland is the largest tourist region in North Rhine-Westphalia, in particular for mountain biking and cycling, water sports and scenic recreation. The town and Skiliftkarussell of Winterberg in the Hochsauerlandkreis is a major winter sport resort.

== Etymology ==
The name Sauerland is first mentioned as Suderland in an official document from 1266. After 1400 the letter 'd' started to disappear. Therefore, Sauerland = southern country is the most convincing meaning, opposed to the theory that Sauer is from the German word sauer meaning sour (poor "sour" soil). Linguistically, "suder-“ is similar to the Old Saxon sûðar (southbound).

== History ==
Before 1800 the western part of the Sauerland was part of the County of the Mark based in Altena; the eastern part adhered to the County of Arnsberg, later became known as the Duchy of Westphalia and was owned by the Archbishops and Electorate of Cologne. The Duchy of Limburg covered a very small area in the lower Lenne river valley. After the Napoleonic Wars the area became part of Prussia and was integrated into the new province of Westphalia. After World War II, Westphalia was merged with the new federal state of North Rhine-Westphalia. Today, the Sauerland consists of the districts Märkischer Kreis, Olpe and Hochsauerland. The western part of the Hessian district Waldeck-Frankenberg is also attributed to the Sauerland because of its geomorphological, as well as its sociocultural similarity, and the stark contrast to the rest of the adjoining Hessian landscape.

== Geography ==
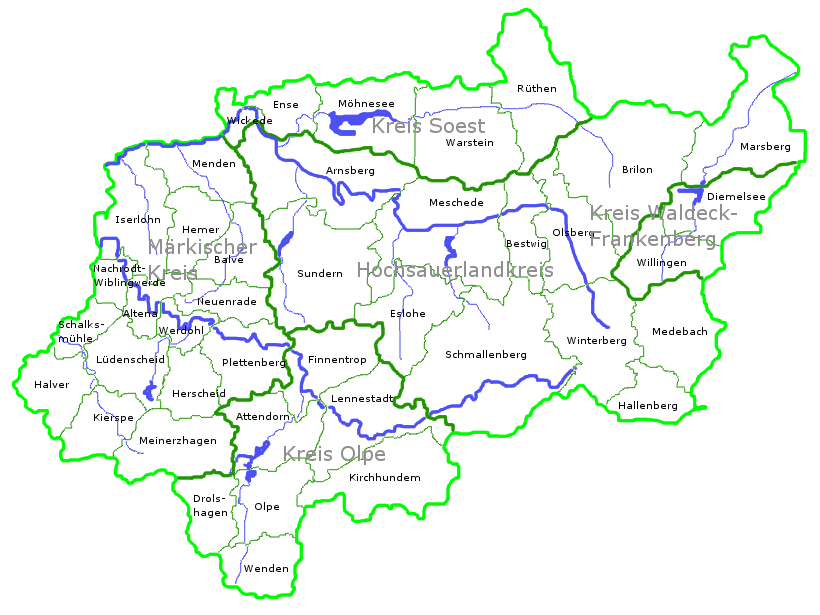
Map of the Sauerland showing district and municipal borders (green) as well as rivers, reservoirs and lakes (blue)

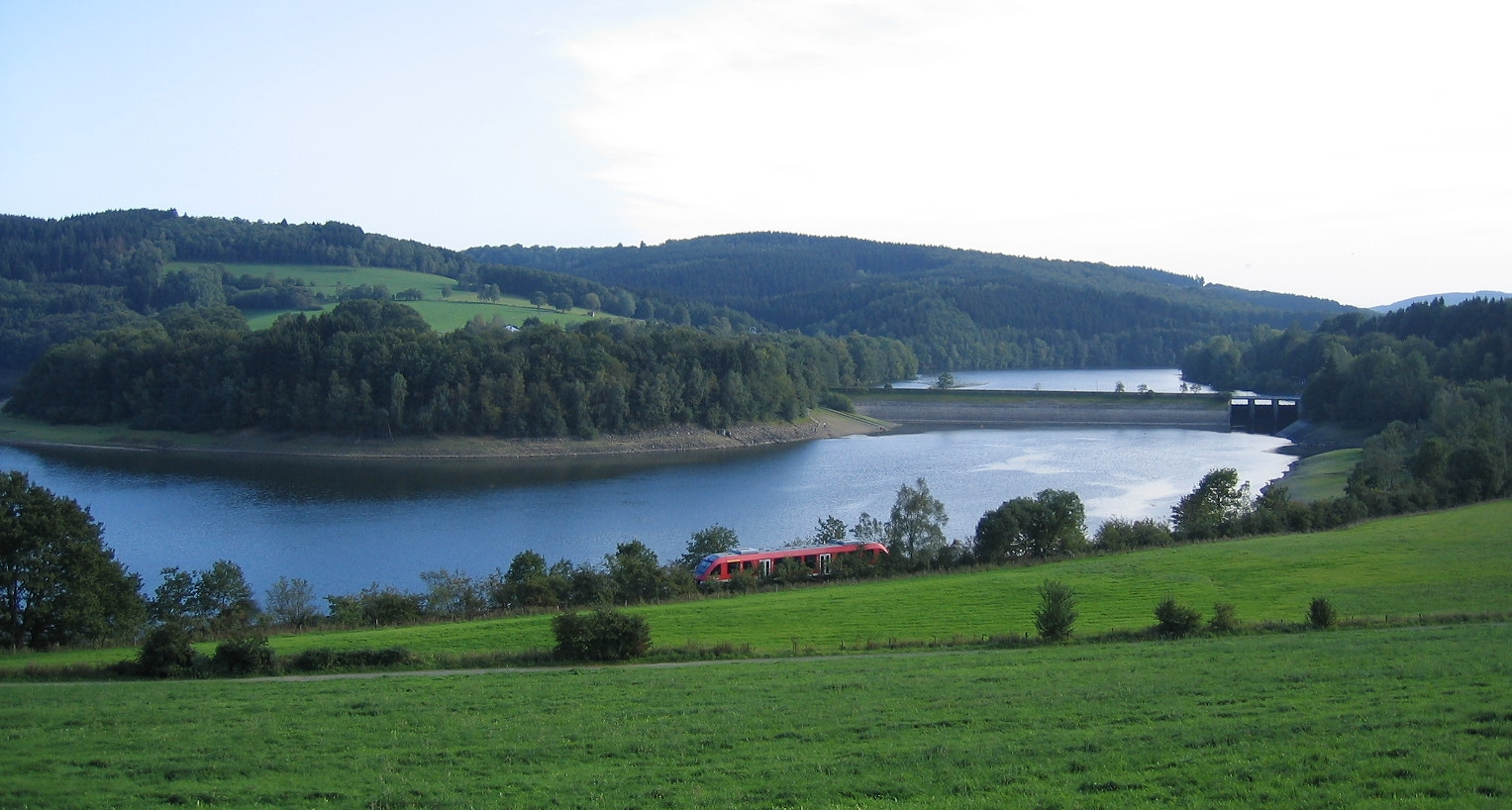
Biggesee between Olpe and Attendorn

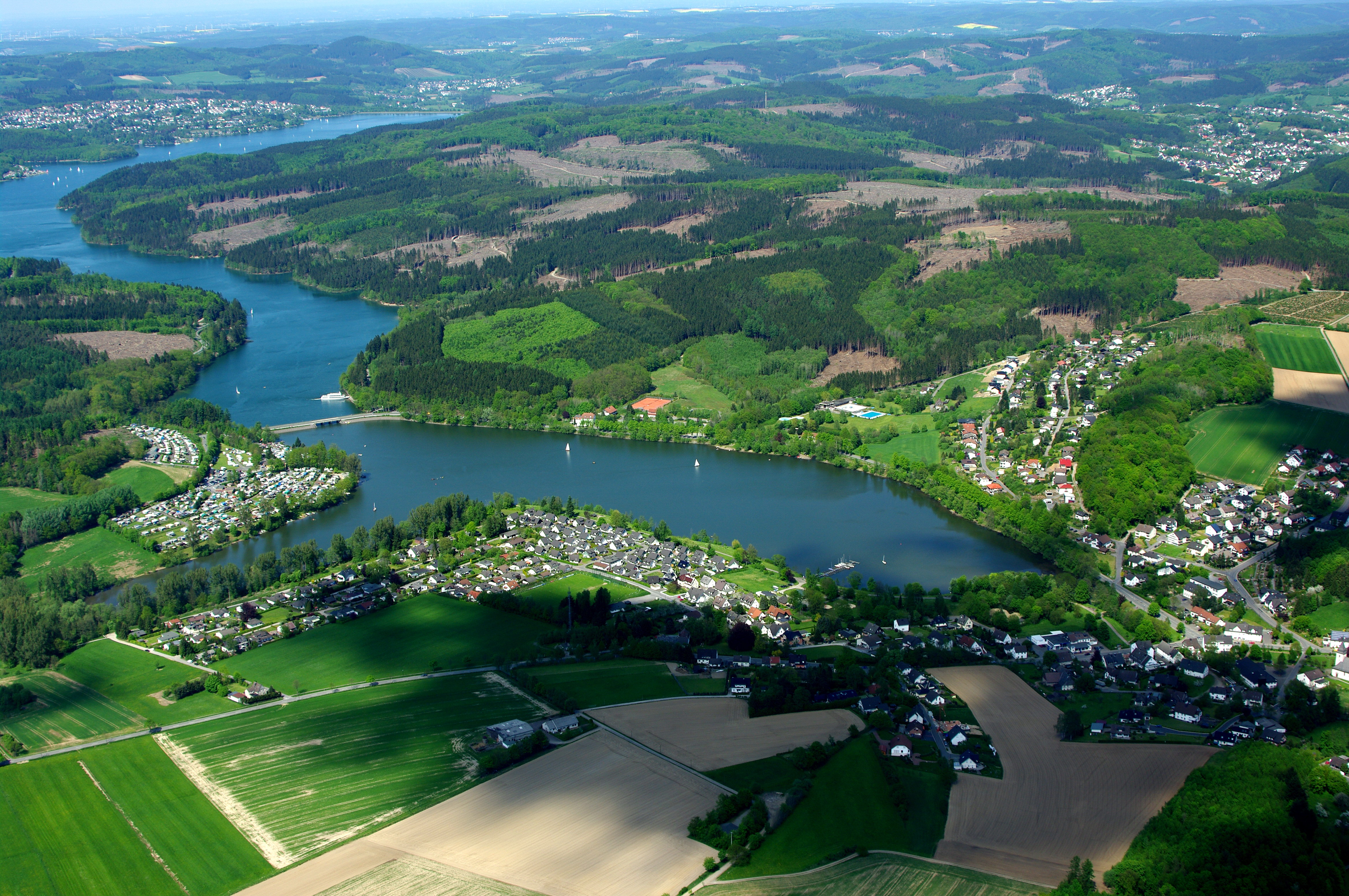
Sorpe Reservoir in the Hochsauerland

To the west the hills continue into the Bergisches Land, to the south into the Siegerland, and to the north-east into the Teutoburg Forest. The major rivers of the Sauerland are the Ruhr and the Lenne. Several artificial lakes were created on the smaller rivers by building dams to store water for the nearby Ruhr area, the biggest reservoirs being the Möhne and Bigge. Although the highest elevation of the Sauerland is the Langenberg (843 m) near Olsberg, the much more renowned summit, which is well known for the nearby skiing facilities, its weather station and observation tower, is the slightly lower Kahler Asten (842 m) near Winterberg. Both Langenberg and Kahler Asten are peaks in the Rothaargebirge mountains.

=== Dams and reservoirs (lakes) ===
The Sauerland has six reservoir lakes.

- Sorpesee
- Biggesee
- Hennesee
- Listersee
- Diemelsee
- Möhnesee

=== Geology ===
The Sauerland is part of the Rhine Massif (Rheinisches Schiefergebirge) including 'Bergisches Land', Westerwald, Siegerland, and, separated by the Rhine valley, the Eifel, Hohes Venn and Hunsrück. The Rheinisches Schiefergebirge was subjected to folding and faulting in the Variscan orogeny in Carboniferous times and eroded to a peneplain in the Permian. The tectonic uplift to the present-day low mountain range began approximately 500,000 years ago and is still going on.

Most of the bedrock underneath the Sauerland originates from a Middle and Upper Devonian period, when it was under a marginal and shallow sea. This has meant that slates, sandstones and greywackes are the most abundant rock types in the Sauerland. In some areas limestones from an ancient reef fringe prevail and are karstified. The Sauerland has several caves, especially in the northern part, the biggest caves being in Attendorn and Balve. In some areas of the Sauerland the occurrence of lead-zinc-silver-ores led to the development of a considerable mining industry, the center of which was the town of Meggen. Mining in this area lasted until the late second half of the 20th century, today there is no active mining in the Sauerland. The sandstones, greywackes and quartzites of the Sauerland as well as, to a minor extent, the limestones are still exploited in numerous quarries. Some of these caves are now becoming modest tourist attractions.

== Fauna and flora ==
Several areas of the Sauerland have the status of biological reserves.

The biodiversity of the Sauerland is significant. It is the main habitat of many species within Germany, for example for the wisent, the black stork, the Eurasian eagle-owl, the great grey shrike, the red-backed shrike and the whinchat. There have been reports of free-roaming wolves, which had been wiped out in Germany until a few specimens returned to the country in 2000.

In 2007, Cyclone Kyrill caused severe damage to the coniferous forests. In addition, massive outbreaks of bark beetles have been killing up to 60% of forest areas in some regions of the Sauerland.

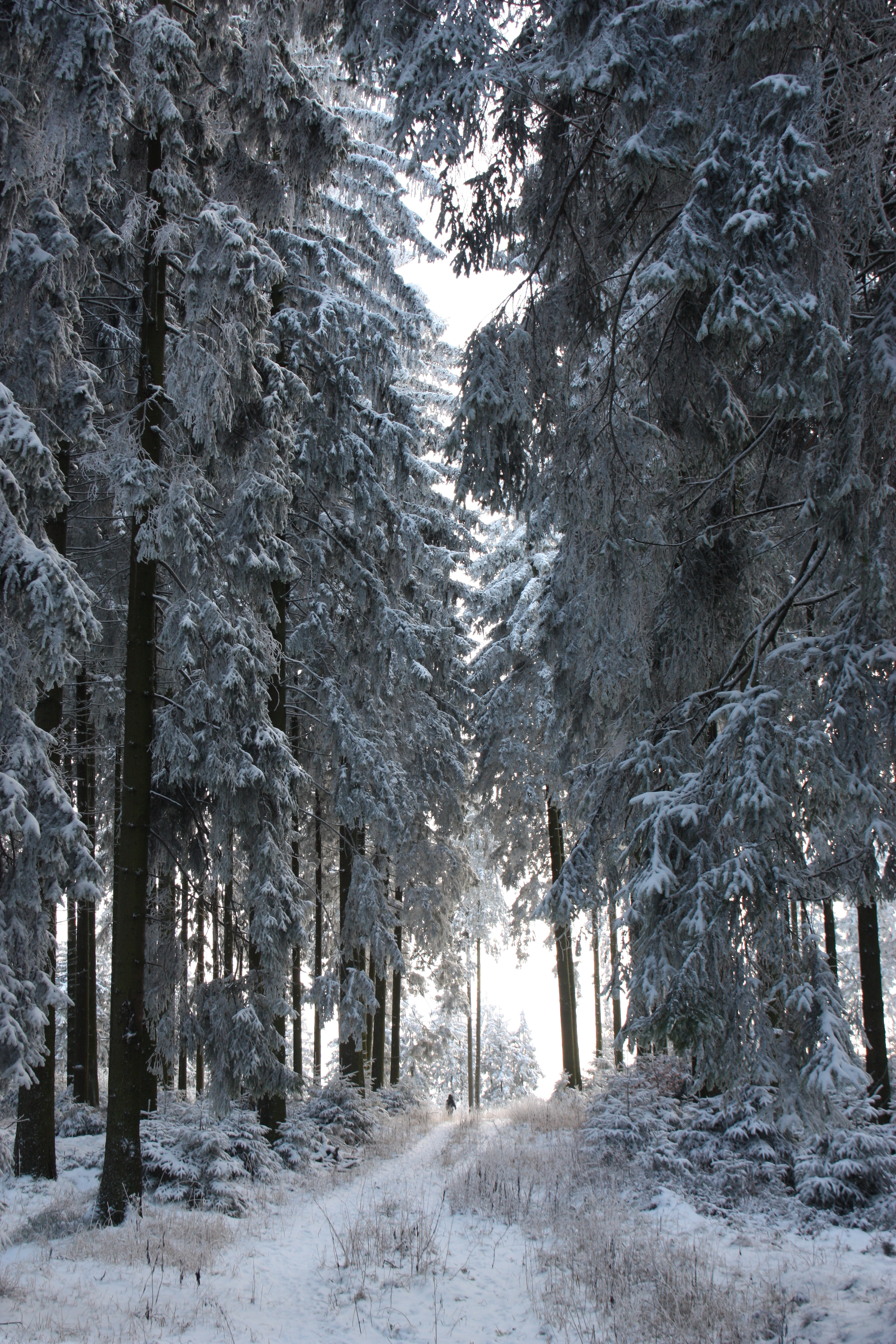
Winter in the Sauerland near Meschede

== Towns and municipalities ==
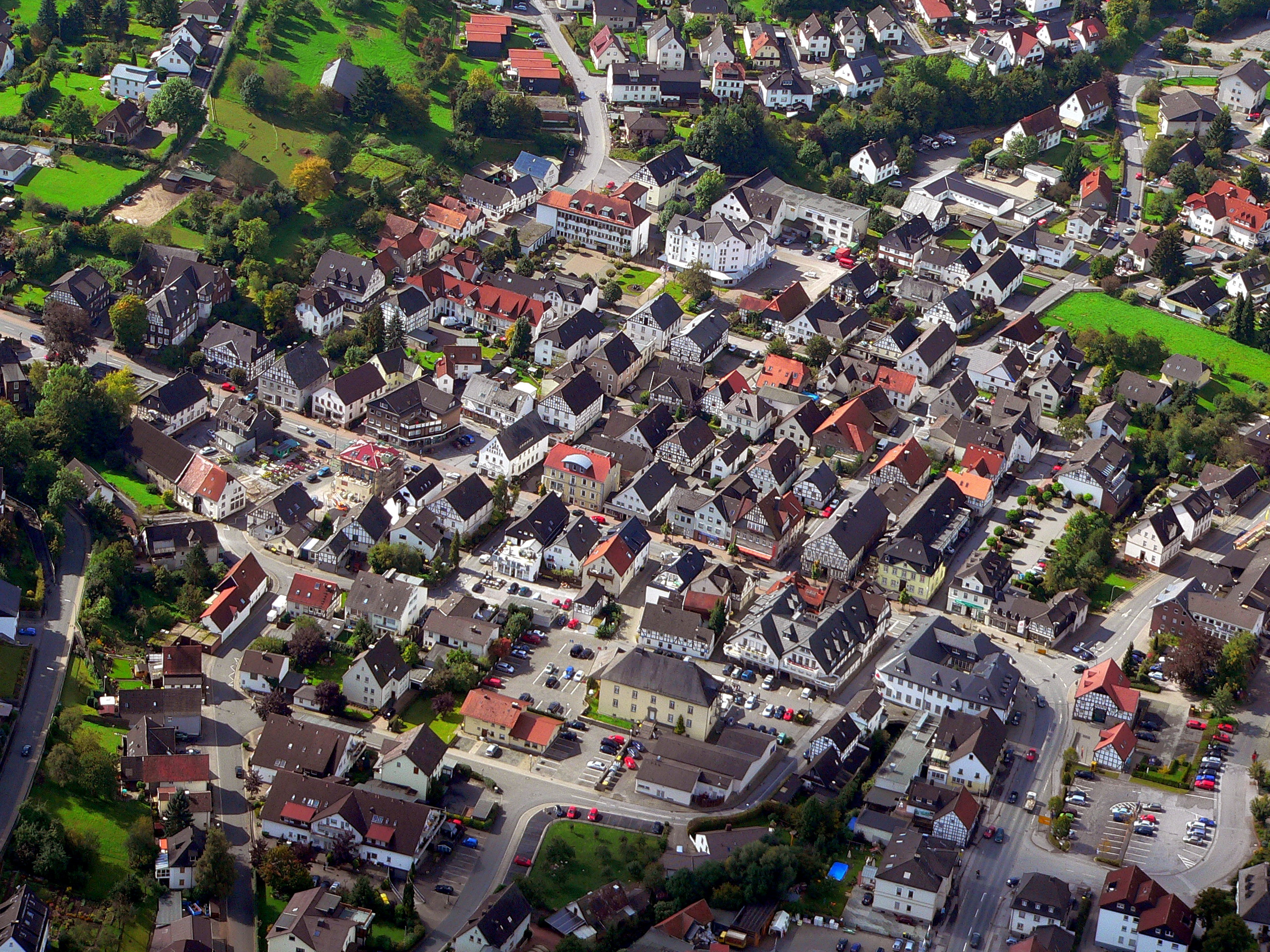
Town centre of Balve in 2007

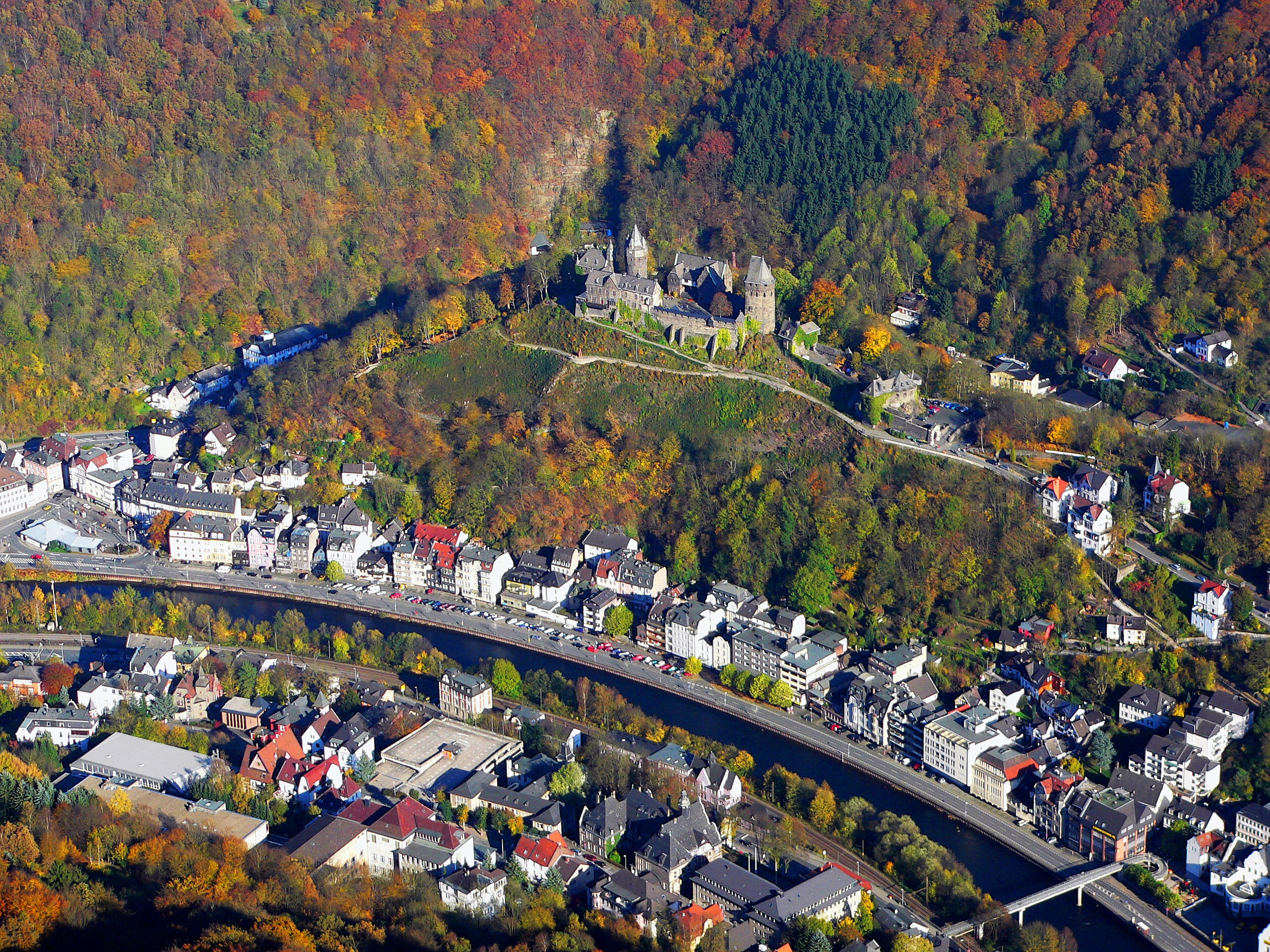
Castle and Lenne in Altena in 2005

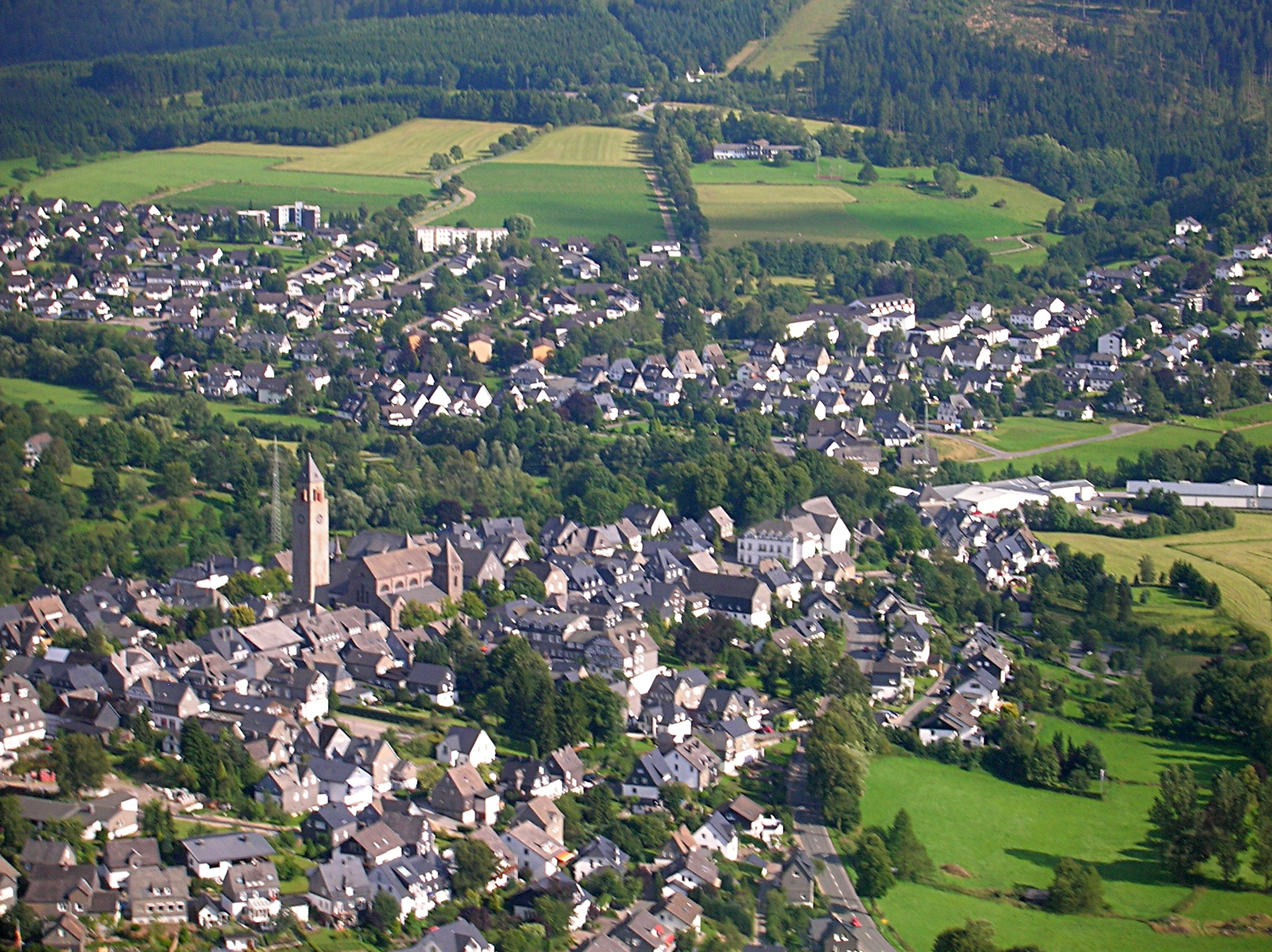
Town centre of Schmallenberg in 2010

The largest town of the Sauerland is Iserlohn; other larger towns are Lüdenscheid and Arnsberg. Meschede is the home of an abbey. Another abbey is located in Bestwig.

=== Hochsauerlandkreis ===
- Arnsberg
- Brilon
- Hallenberg
- Marsberg
- Medebach
- Meschede
- Olsberg
- Schmallenberg
- Sundern
- Winterberg
- Bestwig
- Eslohe

=== Märkischer Kreis ===
- Altena
- Balve
- Halver
- Hemer
- Herscheid
- Iserlohn
- Kierspe
- Lüdenscheid
- Meinerzhagen
- Menden
- Nachrodt-Wiblingwerde
- Neuenrade
- Plettenberg
- Schalksmühle
- Werdohl

=== Olpe ===
- Attendorn
- Drolshagen
- Lennestadt
- Olpe
- Finnentrop
- Kirchhundem
- Wenden

=== Soest ===
- Ense
- Möhnesee
- Rüthen
- Warstein

=== Waldeck-Frankenberg ===
- Upland

== Economy ==
Parts of the Sauerland, especially the major valleys in the northwest, represent an old industrial region. The availability of iron ore and the abundance of wood and water allowed iron production long before the Ruhr area's industrialisation and the mining of its coal took place. Today there are only a few remnants of this early heavy industry; wire production is still important in Altena and a number of small factories still occupy the old industrial areas. Warsteiner is Germany's largest privately owned brewery.

=== Tourism ===
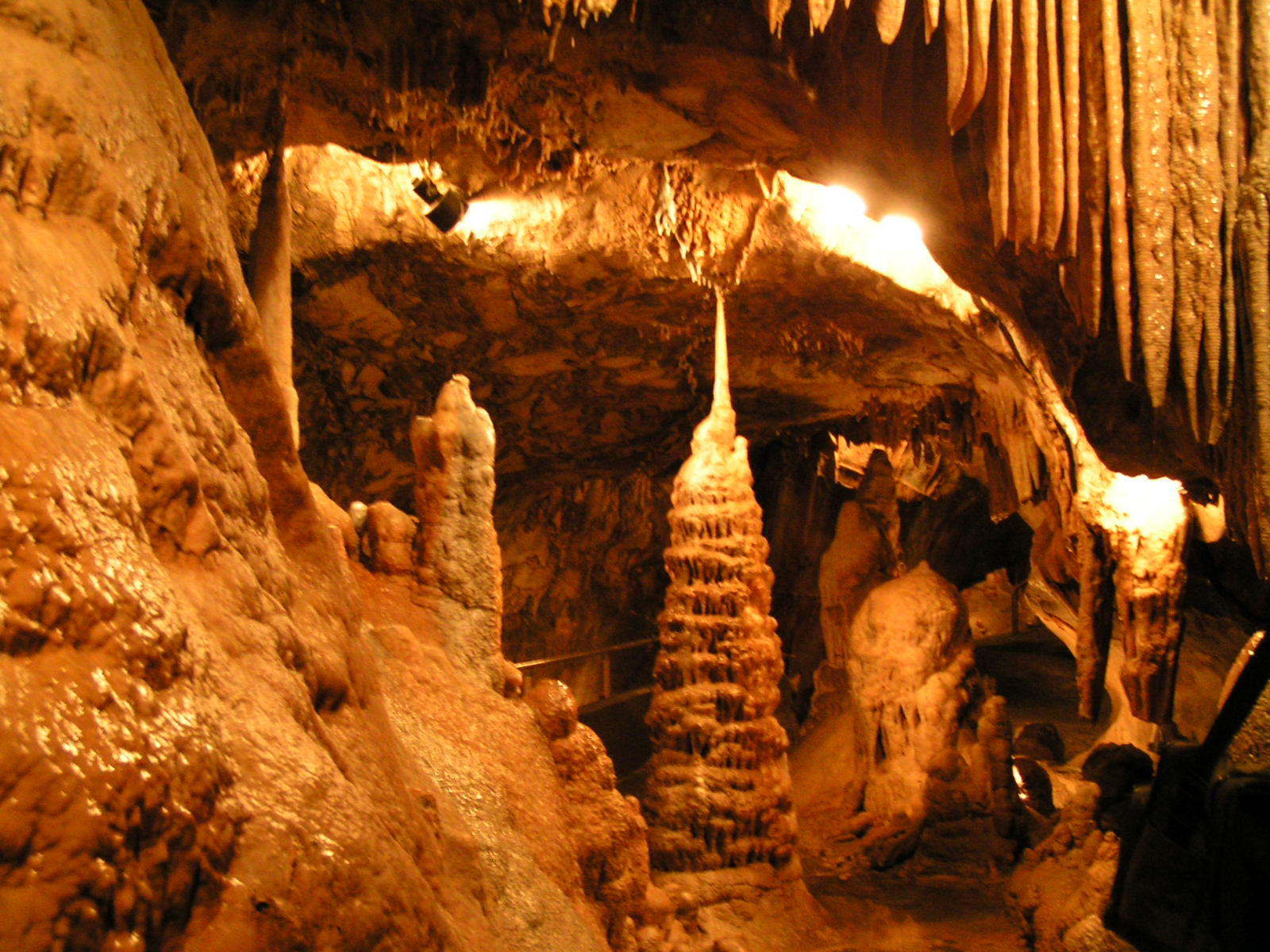
The "Emperor Chamber" in the Dechen Cave at Iserlohn

Sauerland has become a popular tourist area, attracting many visitors from the Ruhr Area and relatively nearby Netherlands. The forests and picturesque small towns are attractive for hikers and outdoor sports. There are more than 30,000 km (19,000 mi) of tagged hiking trails in the Sauerland region, maintained by the Sauerland hiking association (SGV). Some of the towns have the title of Bad (Spa) because of their good air quality and stimulating climate. Winter sports are popular in the Sauerland. The bobsleigh track in Winterberg is widely known in Germany, as well as the ski jumping in Willingen. Sauerland also has a successful theme park called Fort Fun.

Balve Cave is one of the biggest prehistorical caves of Europe and is situated in Balve. The largest accessible limestone cave outside the Alps is the Atta Cave in Attendorn.

=== Transport ===
The Sauerland can be reached by car or train. The drive either via the BAB 4 from Cologne or via the BAB 45 and BAB 46 from Dortmund, takes about one hour; from Kassel or Frankfurt-Rhine-Main (via the Sauerlandlinie) the journey takes about two hours. The closest commercial airport is Dortmund Airport.

- A 4 Bundesautobahn 4
- A 44 Bundesautobahn 44
- A 45 Bundesautobahn 45 (Sauerlandlinie)
- A 46 Bundesautobahn 46

In the region, railways were once the most important means of transportation, but between 1950 and 1990 many smaller branch lines were closed and rail travel is now only present in the major valleys.

The most important lines are:

- Ruhr-Sieg-Strecke: Hagen – Iserlohn-Letmathe – Werdohl – Finnentrop – Lennestadt – Siegen (2 trains per hour, Abellio Rail NRW)
- Ruhrtalbahn: Hagen – Arnsberg – Bestwig – Brilon – Meschede – Warburg (1-2 trains per hour, DB Regio NRW)
- Volmetalbahn: Hagen – Lüdenscheid-Brügge – Meinerzhagen – Overath – Köln (one train per hour, DB Regio NRW)

== See also ==
- Arnsberg Forest Nature Park
- Sauerländer Heimatbund
- List of castles in North Rhine-Westphalia
- List of nature parks in Germany
- Festspiele Balver Höhle
