= Kahler Asten =

Mountain in North Rhine-Westphalia, Germany

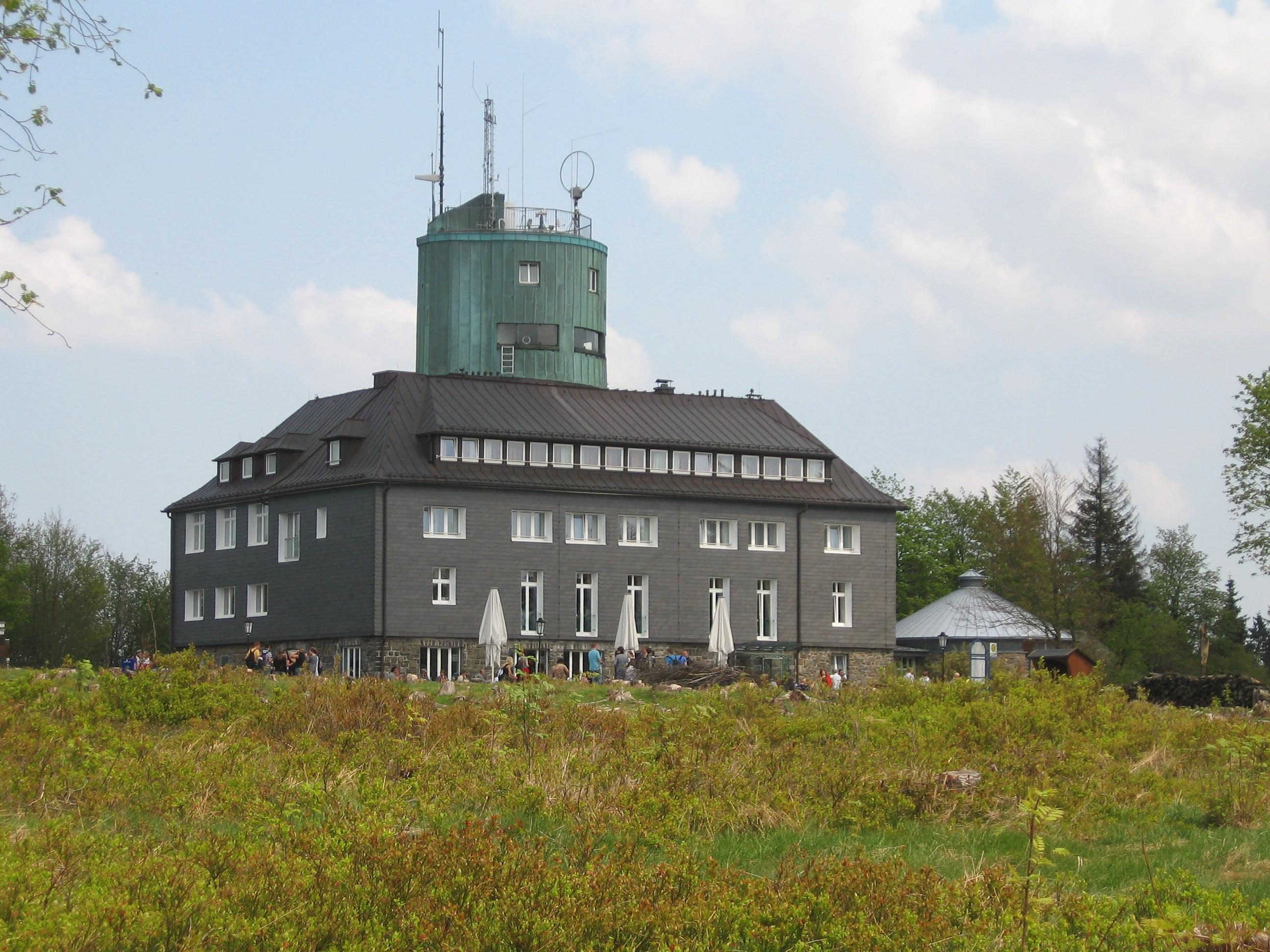
- View over the mountain heath to the Asten tower

Highest point
- Elevation: 841.9 m above sea level (NN) (2,762 ft)
- Isolation: 12 km
- Coordinates: 51°10′46″N 8°29′20″E

Geography
- Location within North Rhine-Westphalia
- Location: Hochsauerland, North Rhine-Westphalia, Germany
- Parent range: Rothaargebirge

The Kahler Asten (German pronunciation: [ˌkaːlɐ ˈʔastn̩]) is an 841.9-metre-high mountain in the Rothaar range in the district of Hochsauerland, in the German state of North Rhine-Westphalia. It is a popular destination, receiving more than 500,000 visitors annually.

== Geography ==
The Kahler Asten is located in the northwestern part of the Rothaargebirge in the Hochsauerland region, a little southwest of Winterberg between the villages of Altastenberg, Neuastenberg and Lenneplätze.

=== Climate ===
The climate of the Kahler Asten is characterized by high precipitation spread mostly evenly across the year, with a slight peak in winter, resulting in an often massive snowpack. In the Köppen-Geiger climate classification system it is classified as Cfb (warm-summer oceanic), but bordering Dfb (warm-summer humid continental/hemiboreal) and also Cfc (subpolar oceanic), as only four months have a mean temperature above 10°C; when using the 0°C rather than the -3°C threshold, it is even Dfb proper, like many locations in the higher reaches of Germany's uplands.

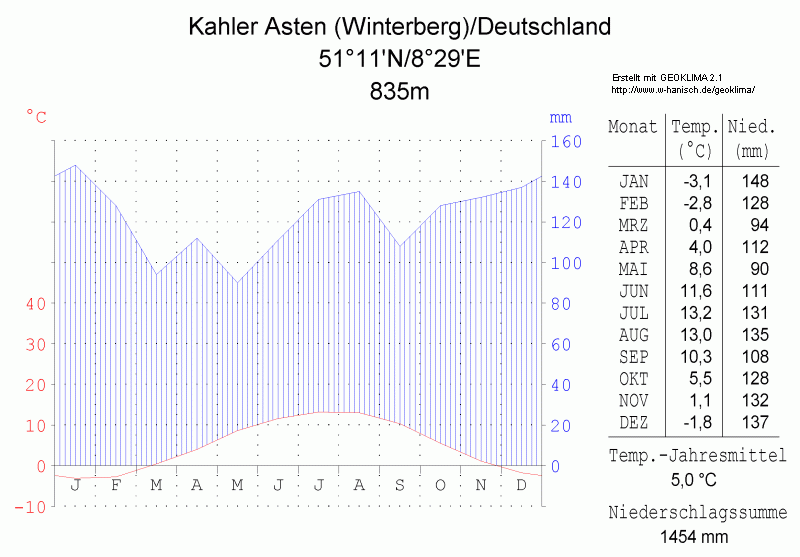
Climatic diagram - Kahler Asten

Climate data for Kahler Asten: 839m (1991−2020)
| Month | Jan | Feb | Mar | Apr | May | Jun | Jul | Aug | Sep | Oct | Nov | Dec | Year |
|---|---|---|---|---|---|---|---|---|---|---|---|---|---|
| Mean daily maximum °C (°F) | 0.1 (32.2) | 0.7 (33.3) | 4.2 (39.6) | 9.3 (48.7) | 13.4 (56.1) | 16.4 (61.5) | 18.4 (65.1) | 18.3 (64.9) | 13.9 (57.0) | 9.0 (48.2) | 4.0 (39.2) | 1.1 (34.0) | 9.1 (48.3) |
| Daily mean °C (°F) | −1.9 (28.6) | −1.5 (29.3) | 1.2 (34.2) | 5.4 (41.7) | 9.3 (48.7) | 12.2 (54.0) | 14.3 (57.7) | 14.1 (57.4) | 10.5 (50.9) | 6.2 (43.2) | 2.0 (35.6) | −0.8 (30.6) | 5.9 (42.7) |
| Mean daily minimum °C (°F) | −3.8 (25.2) | −3.6 (25.5) | −1.3 (29.7) | 2.1 (35.8) | 5.7 (42.3) | 8.6 (47.5) | 10.9 (51.6) | 10.8 (51.4) | 7.8 (46.0) | 4.1 (39.4) | 0.2 (32.4) | −2.7 (27.1) | 3.2 (37.8) |
| Average precipitation mm (inches) | 136.9 (5.39) | 102.3 (4.03) | 103.1 (4.06) | 75.0 (2.95) | 86.9 (3.42) | 95.7 (3.77) | 112.6 (4.43) | 105.9 (4.17) | 110.2 (4.34) | 113.0 (4.45) | 122.9 (4.84) | 141.3 (5.56) | 1,305.8 (51.41) |
| Average snowy days (≥ 1 cm) | 25.1 | 24.4 | 19.5 | 6.3 | 0.4 | 0.0 | 0.0 | 0.0 | 0.0 | 0.7 | 8.4 | 21.6 | 107.2 |
Source: NOAA

Climate data for Kahler Asten, elevation: 839m 1981–2010 normals
| Month | Jan | Feb | Mar | Apr | May | Jun | Jul | Aug | Sep | Oct | Nov | Dec | Year |
|---|---|---|---|---|---|---|---|---|---|---|---|---|---|
| Mean daily maximum °C (°F) | −0.1 (31.8) | 0.4 (32.7) | 3.7 (38.7) | 8.4 (47.1) | 13.3 (55.9) | 15.7 (60.3) | 18.0 (64.4) | 17.7 (63.9) | 13.6 (56.5) | 9.0 (48.2) | 3.6 (38.5) | 0.7 (33.3) | 8.7 (47.6) |
| Daily mean °C (°F) | −2.2 (28.0) | −1.9 (28.6) | 1.0 (33.8) | 4.9 (40.8) | 7.7 (45.9) | 11.9 (53.4) | 14.2 (57.6) | 14.1 (57.4) | 10.6 (51.1) | 6.4 (43.5) | 3.6 (38.5) | −1.3 (29.7) | 5.8 (42.4) |
| Mean daily minimum °C (°F) | −4.2 (24.4) | −4.1 (24.6) | −1.6 (29.1) | 1.5 (34.7) | 5.6 (42.1) | 8.1 (46.6) | 10.4 (50.7) | 10.4 (50.7) | 7.5 (45.5) | 3.9 (39.0) | −0.3 (31.5) | −3.3 (26.1) | 2.8 (37.1) |
| Average precipitation mm (inches) | 150.4 (5.92) | 110.2 (4.34) | 128.0 (5.04) | 85.4 (3.36) | 92.5 (3.64) | 103.5 (4.07) | 114.0 (4.49) | 104.7 (4.12) | 127.6 (5.02) | 119.0 (4.69) | 134.7 (5.30) | 147.9 (5.82) | 1,417.9 (55.81) |
Source: Météoclimat

== Height ==
Erroneously, the Kahle Asten is often said to be the highest mountain in North Rhine-Westphalia or even sometimes in the whole of northwest Germany, because it is shown on the WDR weather map. In fact the highest peak is the 843.1-metre-high Langenberg on the state border with Hesse; and the nearby summit of the Hegekopf (842.9 m) in Hesse, where the Rothaar Mountains merge into the Upland near Willingen, is even higher. The height of the Kahle Asten on the latest topographical maps is given as 841.9 m, but its height is also recorded on a marker stone at the spot as 842 m. The Kahle Asten is therefore only the third highest mountain in the region, but the most well known by far.

== Watershed ==
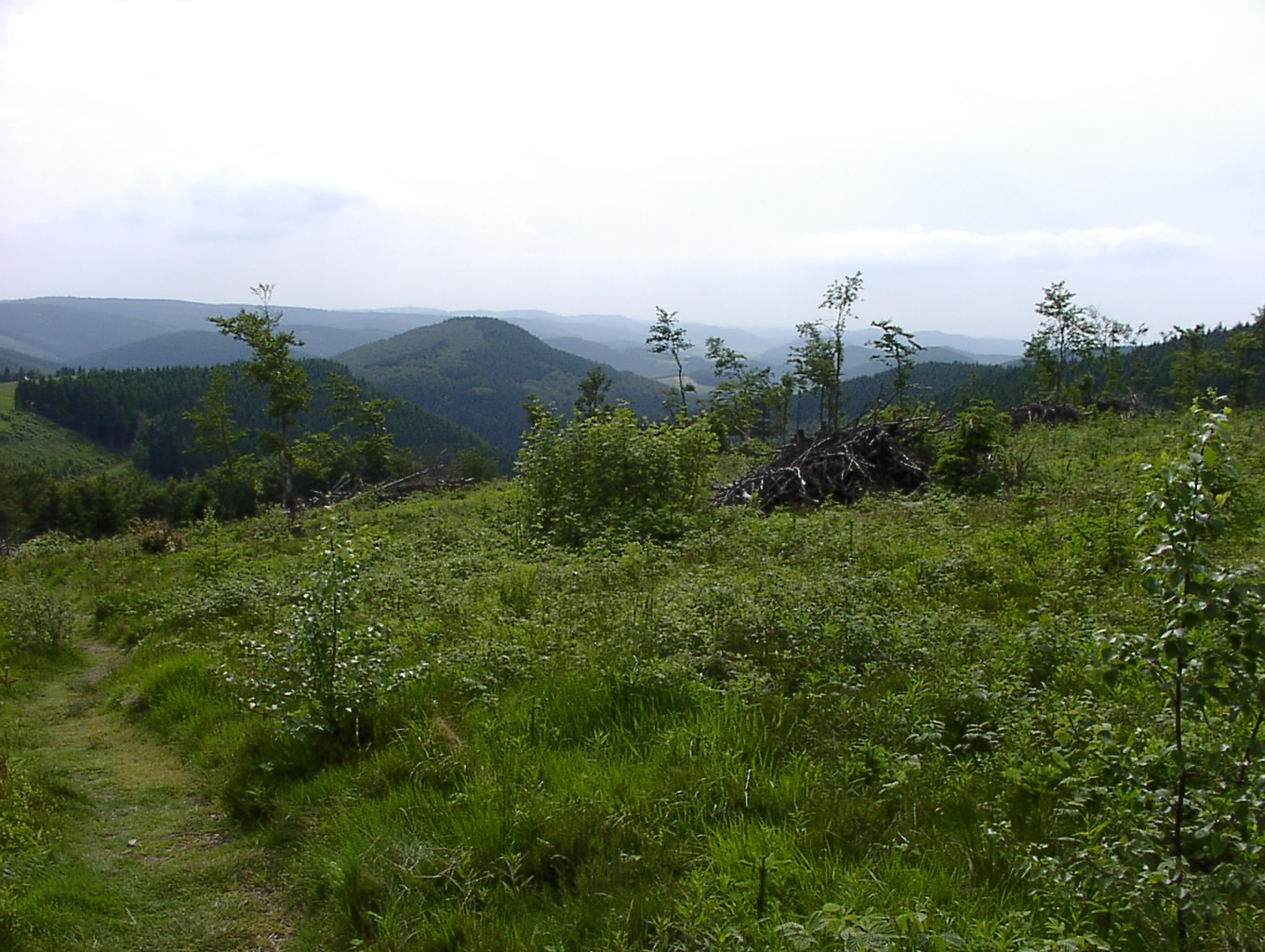
View from the Kahle Asten

Part of the Rhine-Weser watershed runs over the Kahler Asten, and the Lenne also has its source near the summit. The enclosed spring, which only wells up from time to time, is located at a height of 820 m and is thus the highest river source in northwest Germany. The Lenne flows west into the Ruhr and on into the Rhine. Another stream, the Odeborn, emerges on the southeast slope of the mountain, whilst the Sonneborn rises on the northeast side and flows southeast. These two streams reach the Weser via the Eder and Fulda rivers.

== Weather station ==
There is a permanent German Weather Service weather station on the Kahler Asten which is part of the weather bureau at Essen. It has contributed significantly to the public's awareness of the mountain.

== Hochheide ==
The summit of the Kahler Asten is part of a mountain heath. Because many rare and threatened species live there, it has been placed under conservation protection as part of the Kahler Asten nature reserve and Special Area of Conservation (48.69 ha). Hardly any trees grow on the heath, because the vegetation is kept short by sheep grazing. In places, however, natural reforestation has already taken a strong hold because the grazing is insufficient. Through manual intervention using chain saws and strimmers, attempts are being made to stop this reforestation. The vegetation consists mainly of common heather (Calluna vulgaris), mat-grass and subshrubs. Breeding birds on the heath include the meadow pipit and tree pipit. The black grouse used to breed here, but the population died out decades ago.

== Observation tower and hotel-restaurant ==
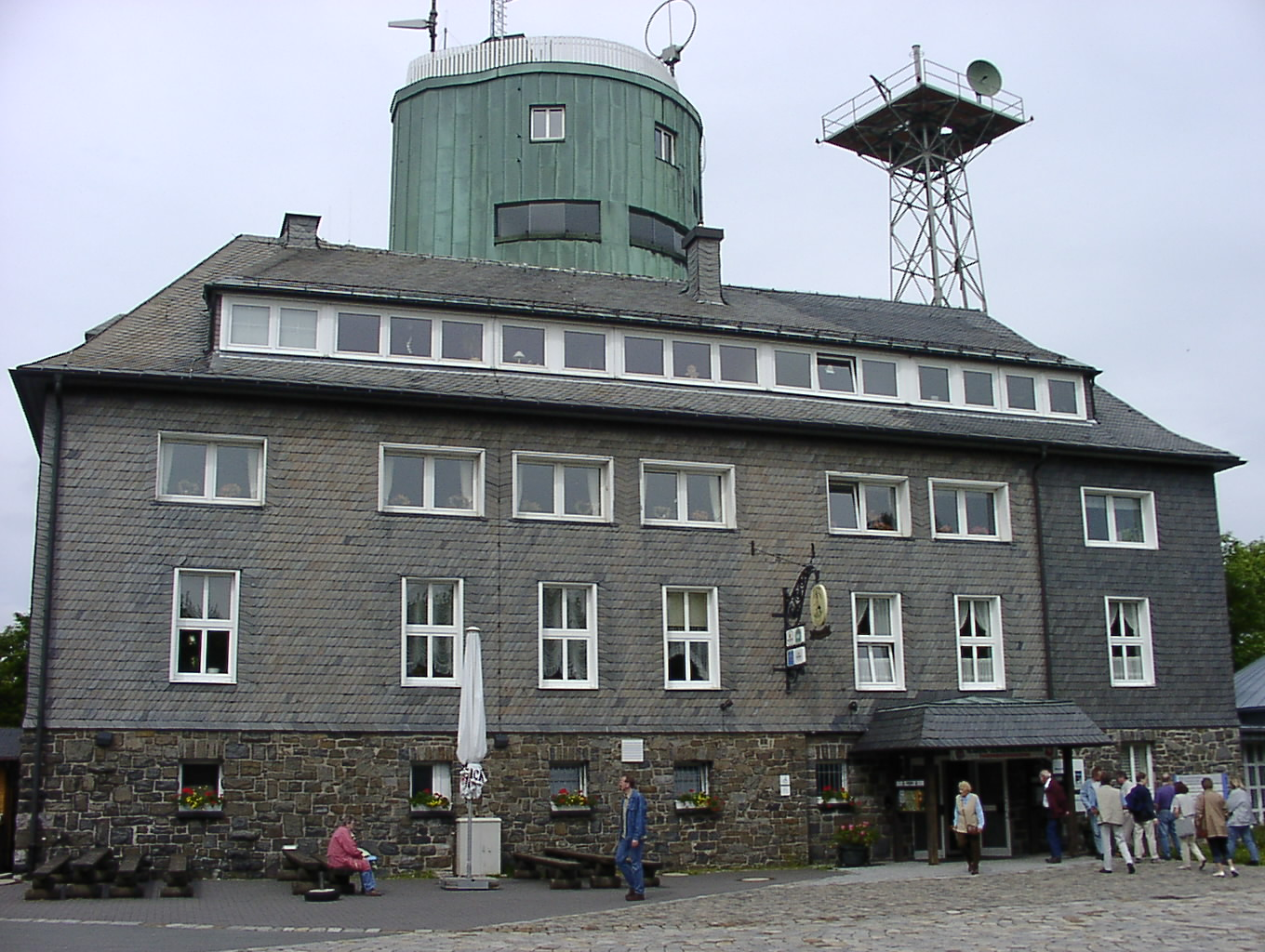
Restaurant and observation tower on the Kahle Asten

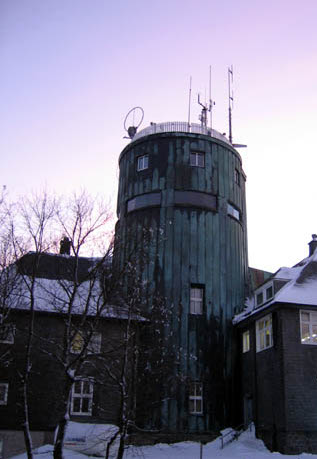
The Asten tower in winter

There is an observation tower on the summit of the Kahler Asten immediately next to the hotel-restaurant called the Astenturm (Asten tower). From the platform of the tower, which is 862 m above sea level (NN), there is a superb all-round view over the Rothaargebirge and other parts of the Sauerland. In very clear weather, even the Brocken mountain in the Harz (Saxony-Anhalt), 163 km away, can be seen without the aid of binoculars.

Plans for a monument on the Kahler Asten go back to the Vormärz period in the first half of the 19th century. As early as 1843 King Frederick William IV of Prussia visited the Kahler Asten. At the time it was planned to commemorate the 1000th anniversary of the Treaty of Verdun by building an observation tower as a monument. This treaty sealed the division of the Carolingian Empire into three kingdoms: West Francia, East Francia and Lotharingia and was seen as the beginning of the separate development of the French and German nations. During the 1848 year of revolutions the Asten tower was the target of a demonstration for the aims of the March revolution and of German unity.

Plans for a monument were not taken any further, however, until 1881. The foundation stone was laid on 22 June 1884 by the district administrator, Federath, in the presence of numerous honoured guests. In the same year the construction of a tower began. The 25-meter-high skeleton fell victim to an autumn storm, however. Rumours of faulty construction could not be proven in the subsequent legal action. By 1889 the district administrator was able to persuade private donors and the Westphalian provincial association to provide the means to rebuild the tower. It was opened in 1895.

Since 1900 the tower has been an official monument of the Province of Westphalia. Since 1918 the tower has also been a weather station.

The first renovations were needed in 1923 as a result of weather-induced metal fatigue. At the same time, the restaurant was built. New modification plans were started in 1930 and implemented in 1937. During the Second World War the tower was almost completely destroyed by a direct hit from artillery. The repair of war damage was not completed until 1955. In 1967 the damaged slate sheathing had to be replaced by copper. In 1995 an exhibition room was added. In 2004 ownership of the tower passed to Westphalia-Lippe Property Management, a subsidiary of the Westphalia-Lippe Regional Council (Landschaftsverband Westfalen-Lippe). A thorough renovation and refurbishment was then carried out by December 2005.

After its restoration the hotel-restaurant opened its doors again in December 2005 and the Astenturm itself was re-opened on 20 March 2006. It now has a self-service area, a restaurant area and 17 double rooms with 34 beds.

== Exhibition on the mountain ==
Since October 2008 visitors can learn more about the mountain at its summit through an exhibition called the Kahler Asten - the roof of Westphalia. The central themes of the exhibition are the nature reserve with its mountain heath, the weather station and the history of the Asten tower. In addition clips of amateur film from past decades are shown.

== Winter sport ==
The Kahler Asten and the surrounding area, with its sister mountains, out to about 40 kilometres is one of the most well-known winter sport regions in the German Central Uplands due to its good snow conditions. The Kahler Asten itself is part of the ski lift complex known as the Skiliftkarussell Winterberg.

== See also ==
- List of mountains and hills in North Rhine-Westphalia

== Literature ==
- Sluka, Klaudia (2006). Einfach Spitze. Westfalen Spiegel, Feb 2006. (pdf, 214 kB)
- Hochsauerlandkreis – Untere Landschaftsbehörde: Landschaftsplan Winterberg. Meschede 2008, p. 100
- Neueröffnung des Astenturms am 20. März 2006. In: Sauerland. 2/2006 S. 83-85
