= Odeborn =

River in Germany

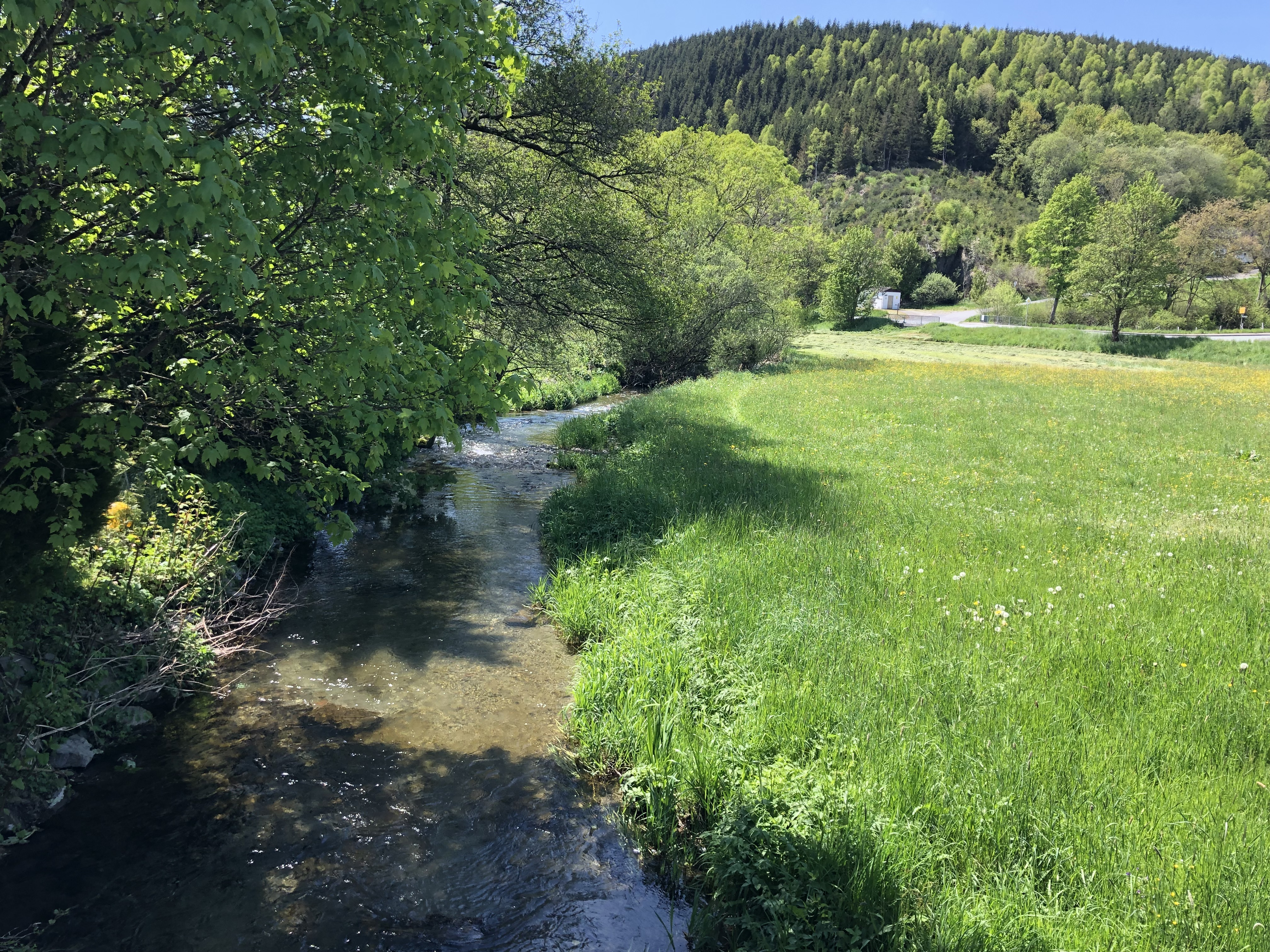

- Location within Germany

Location
- Country: Germany
- State: North Rhine-Westphalia

Physical characteristics
- Mouth
  - location: Eder
  - coordinates: 51.0302°N 8.3847°E
- Length: 21.2 km (13.2 mi)

Basin features
- Progression: Eder→ Fulda→ Weser→ North Sea

Odeborn is a river of North Rhine-Westphalia, Germany. It flows into the Eder near Bad Berleburg.

== See also ==
- List of rivers of North Rhine-Westphalia
