= Winterberg =

- Town
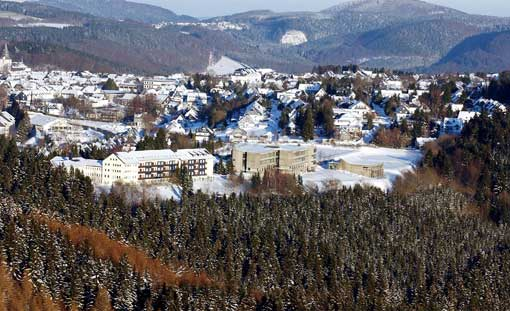
- Winter view of Winterberg in 2006

- Flag Coat of arms

- Location of Winterberg within Hochsauerlandkreis district
- Interactive map of Winterberg
- Location within Germany Location within North Rhine-Westphalia
- Coordinates: 51°12′N 08°31′E
- Country: Germany
- State: North Rhine-Westphalia
- Admin. region: Arnsberg
- District: Hochsauerlandkreis
- Subdivisions: 14

Government
  - Mayor (2020–25): Michael Beckmann (CDU)

Area
  - Total: 147.95 km^{2} (57.12 sq mi)
- Elevation: 450–600 m (1,480–1,970 ft)

Population (2025-12-31)
  - Total: 13,124
  - Density: 88.706/km^{2} (229.75/sq mi)
- Time zone: UTC+01:00 (CET)
  - Summer (DST): UTC+02:00 (CEST)
- Postal codes: 59955
- Dialling codes: 02981
- Vehicle registration: HSK
- Website: www.winterberg.de

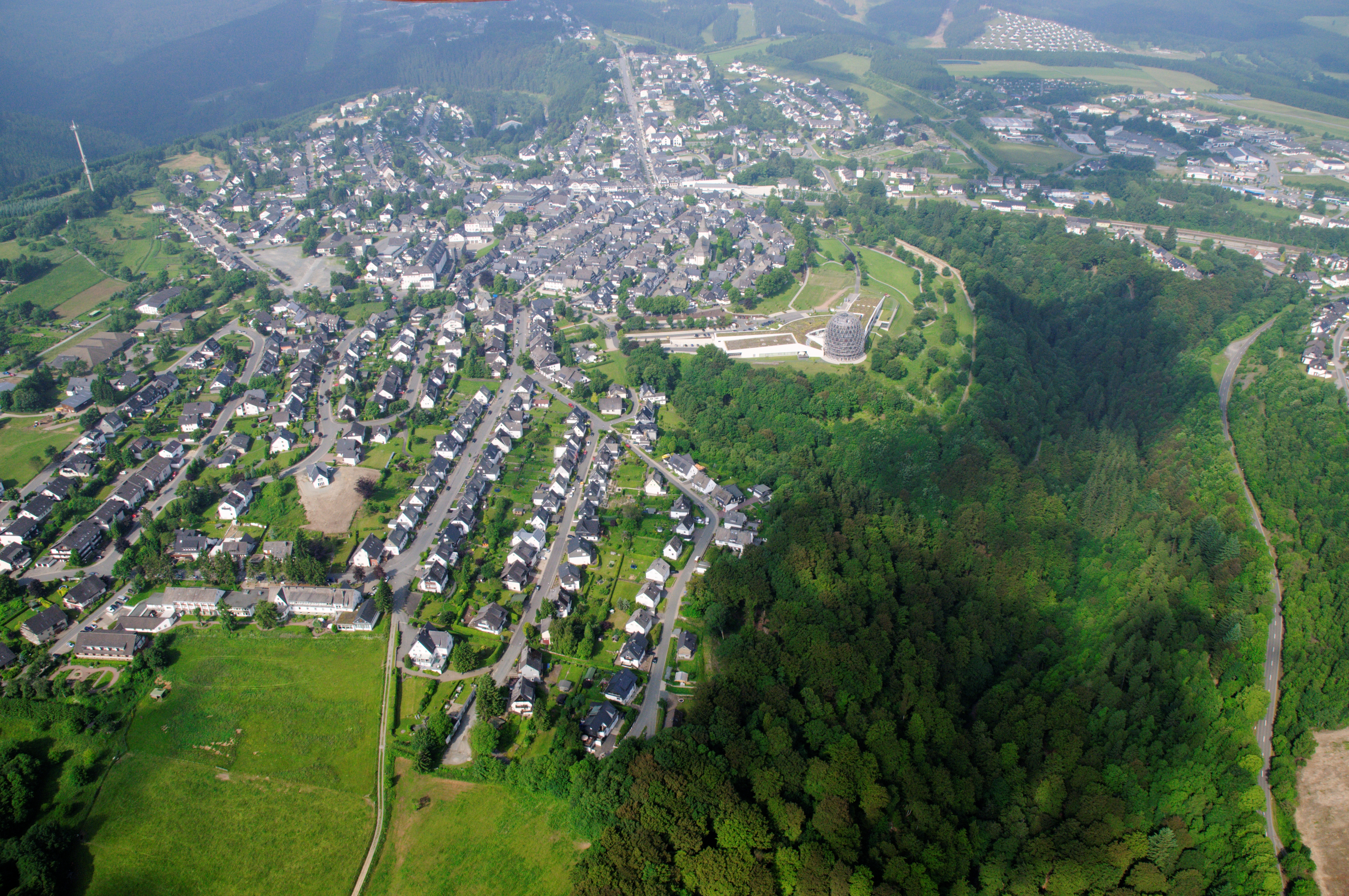
Winterberg

Winterberg (German pronunciation: [ˈvɪntɐˌbɛʁk]; Westphalian: Winnenmerg) is a town in the Hochsauerland district of North Rhine-Westphalia, central Germany and a major winter sport resort of the Wintersport Arena Sauerland.

== Geography ==
Winterberg is located in the middle of the Sauerland, at the source of the Ruhr and Lenne rivers.

=== Neighbouring municipalities ===
- Bad Berleburg
- Hallenberg
- Medebach
- Olsberg
- Schmallenberg

=== Division of the town ===
After the local government reforms of 1975 Winterberg consists of 15 districts:

- Altastenberg
- Altenfeld
- Elkeringhausen
- Grönebach
- Hildfeld
- Hoheleye
- Langewiese
- Lenneplätze
- Mollseifen
- Neuastenberg
- Niedersfeld
- Siedlinghausen
- Silbach
- Winterberg
- Züschen

== Climate ==
Winterberg experiences a humid continental climate (Köppen Dfb) like most of Germany, however also bordering on subarctic climate (Dfc), thanks to its altitude, with only having one average temperature above 10 °C and September only being barely above it. The summers are short and cool, while the winters are cold, but warmer than winters in the Alps or in the Ore Mountains. The growing season nonetheless lasts for only 100 days.

Depending on the definition the climate can also described as oceanic (Cfb), bordering on a subpolar oceanic climate (Cfc).

Climate data for Winterberg, 1961–1990
| Month | Jan | Feb | Mar | Apr | May | Jun | Jul | Aug | Sep | Oct | Nov | Dec | Year |
|---|---|---|---|---|---|---|---|---|---|---|---|---|---|
| Mean daily maximum °C (°F) | 0 (32) | 1 (34) | 3.9 (39.0) | 8.4 (47.1) | 13.5 (56.3) | 16.5 (61.7) | 18 (64) | 17.9 (64.2) | 14.9 (58.8) | 10.5 (50.9) | 4.3 (39.7) | 1.3 (34.3) | 9.2 (48.6) |
| Daily mean °C (°F) | −2 (28) | −1.6 (29.1) | 0.9 (33.6) | 4.5 (40.1) | 9.2 (48.6) | 12.1 (53.8) | 13.8 (56.8) | 13.6 (56.5) | 10.8 (51.4) | 7 (45) | 2 (36) | −0.9 (30.4) | 5.8 (42.4) |
| Mean daily minimum °C (°F) | −4.2 (24.4) | −4.1 (24.6) | −1.8 (28.8) | 0.9 (33.6) | 5.1 (41.2) | 8.1 (46.6) | 9.8 (49.6) | 9.9 (49.8) | 7.6 (45.7) | 4.4 (39.9) | −0.1 (31.8) | −3 (27) | 2.8 (37.0) |
| Average precipitation mm (inches) | 140.2 (5.52) | 96.1 (3.78) | 115.3 (4.54) | 93 (3.7) | 97.6 (3.84) | 114.4 (4.50) | 119 (4.7) | 96.2 (3.79) | 96.1 (3.78) | 104.7 (4.12) | 136.5 (5.37) | 151.2 (5.95) | 1,603.3 (63.12) |

== History ==
=== Town Origin ===
Winterberg was declared a city by Archbishop Konrad von Hochstaden (1238-’61) about 1270. The foundation of the city of Winterberg was presumably carried out together with the cloister in Küstelberg. Here indicates a document of 1276 in which the rights are regulated in the town between archbishop and cloister. In this document a church is mentioned in Winterberg whose precursor presumably goes back till the time about 1225. The city fortification seems to have granted in the 14th century first only very much restricted protection. The count von Waldeck conquered the town 1321. About 1357 Winterberg became destroyed by Gottfried IV. von Arnsberg during his war with the Cologne archbishop Wilhelm von Gennep. For the reconstruction the archbishop granted an at first ten-year-old tax freedom. This was extended in 1370 and 1374 in each case by other five years. At this time Winterberg owned the same town right like Hallenberg. Winterberg was a member of the Hanseatic League from the 13th until the 17th century. The town was in the middle of two trade roads, Heidenstrasse between Cologne and Kassel and Heerstrasse between Frankfurt am Main and Soest. The bad agricultural conditions led to the fact that trade played a central role as a life basis of the town.

=== Deserted Medieval Town ===
Between 1350 and 1500 the surrounding settlements of Wernsdorf, Merleheim, Haarfeld, Günninghausen and Elkeringhausen were abandoned by their inhabitants. They often moved to Winterberg while they maintained the possession rights on their land. The abandonment of the old settlements is likely related to the plague and also to the frequent feuds and lootings of the time, since bigger towns offered a better protection against enemy troops. Only the cities/towns of Winterberg, Hallenberg, Schmallenberg and Medebach were presumably inhabited at this time. The surrounding areas were most likely left completely deserted.

=== Modern times 'til the end of the Thirty Years' War (1500–1650) ===
By the acquisition of region "Marken" the area of Winterberg strongly extended. There were similar trends in neighbouring towns. At the beginning of the 16th century Winterberg expanded her farmland in the area of Astenberg. Thereby they came into conflict with the count of von Waldeck who owned rights in the neighbouring village Nordenau. From southwest her territorial claims overlapped with the county Wittgenstein. This quarrel stretched on with both opponents up to the end of the 18th century. In a comparison with Wittgenstein 1783 the debatable area was split. During the Thirty Years' War the neighbouring town Medebach and Hallenberg were 1634 destroyed by Hessian troops. Both had to suffer very much from contributions, lootings and murders. Besides, still the plague broke out soon afterwards. Both towns thereby had to register big population losses. This destiny seems to have saved the city of Winterberg to a great extent. An important clue for this is that in 1638/39 the town council could buy a new organ for 240 imperial talers. Vice versa this could be the trigger for a vain siege of the town about 1640. The Winterberger shooters repulsed the attacking Hessen and Sweden successfully.

=== Witch hunts ===
As in many other places in the Duchy of Westphalia, between the 16th and 18th centuries, witch trials and executions took place in Winterberg. The exact number is unknown because the source material is extremely poor. Documented witch trials took place in 1523, probably 1562, 1629 and possibly 1728. On November 19, 1993, at the site of the "Winterberger Halsgerichts" a monument was opened as a memorial to the victims of the 16th century witch hunts.

== Population ==
Historical population

| Year | Pop. | ±% p.a. |
|---|---|---|
| 1965 | 11,997 | — |
| 1970 | 12,629 | +1.03% |
| 1975 | 13,771 | +1.75% |
| 1980 | 15,166 | +1.95% |
| 1985 | 15,274 | +0.14% |
| 1990 | 14,229 | −1.41% |
| 1995 | 15,068 | +1.15% |

| Year | Pop. | ±% p.a. |
|---|---|---|
| 2000 | 14,848 | −0.29% |
| 2005 | 14,451 | −0.54% |
| 2010 | 13,566 | −1.26% |
| 2015 | 12,798 | −1.16% |
| 2020 | 12,442 | −0.56% |
| 2025 | 13,124 | +1.07% |

Source: Landesdatabank Nordrhein-Westfalen

== Points of interest ==
The second highest mountain of the Sauerland, the Kahler Asten in the Rothaargebirge, is located in the city area, which also contains the spring of the Lenne and Ruhr rivers.

== Transport ==
The nearest airports to Winterberg is Paderborn Lippstadt Airport (68 km away) and Dortmund Airport (97 km away). Frankfurt Airport is also at a reasonable distance, it is located 163 km away from the town.

== Sport ==
The city is one of the winter sports centers of the Sauerland, best known probably for the bobsleigh, luge, and skeleton track. In 2003, there were the first official World Wok Championships, initiated by Stefan Raab.

== Coat of arms ==
The arms show the city (the city walls only existed between 1261 and 1266) behind the patron of the city, Saint James, as Winterberg is located on one of the Ways of St. James.

== International relations ==
Winterberg is twinned with:

- Le Touquet (France) -- since 1974
- Rijssen - Holten (Netherlands) -- since 1974
- Rixensart (Belgium) -- since 1989
- Oberhof (Germany) -- since 1990
- Sölden (Austria) -- since 2018
- Holmenkollen (Norway) -- since 2018
- Bariloche (Argentina) -- since 2018
