= Nordenau =

- Stadtteil of Schmallenberg
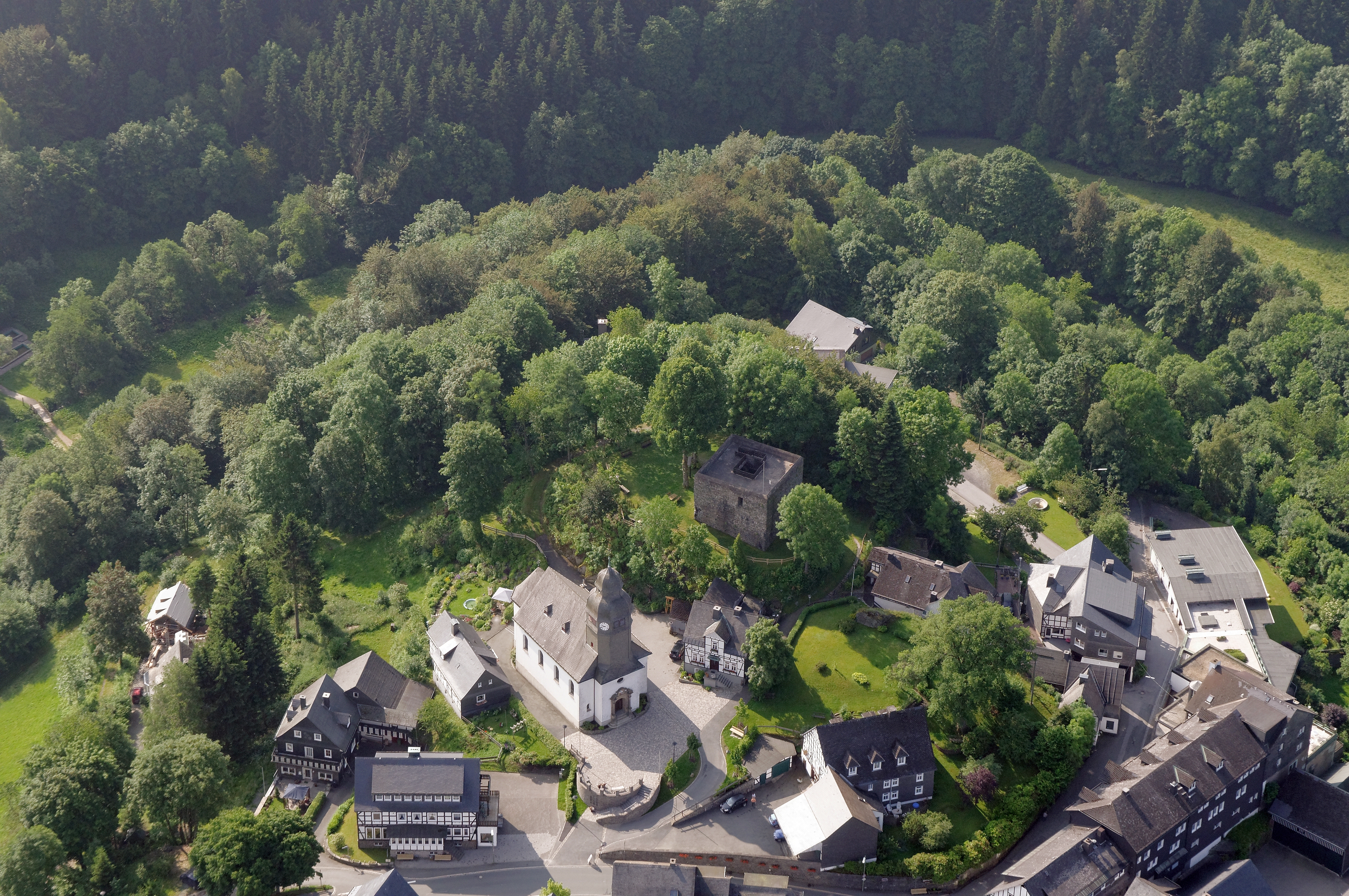
- Interactive map of Nordenau
- Location within Germany Location within North Rhine-Westphalia
- Coordinates: 51°10′32″N 8°25′27″E
- Country: Germany
- State: North Rhine-Westphalia
- Admin. region: Arnsberg
- District: Hochsauerlandkreis
- Town: Schmallenberg

Population (2021-12-31)
  - Total: 209
- Time zone: UTC+01:00 (CET)
  - Summer (DST): UTC+02:00 (CEST)

Nordenau is a locality in the municipality Schmallenberg in the High Sauerland District in North Rhine-Westphalia, Germany.

The village has 209 inhabitants and lies in the east of the municipality of Schmallenberg at a height of around 584 m. The river Nesselbach flows through the village. Nordenau borders on the villages of Nesselbach, Lengenbeck, Inderlenne, Westfeld and Ohlenbach.

Around 1200AD, the castle Norderna (today Rappelstein castle ruin) was built by the noblemen by Grafschaft beside the old Heidenstraße. The village used to belong to the municipality of Oberkirchen in Amt Schmallenberg until the end of 1974.

== Gallery ==
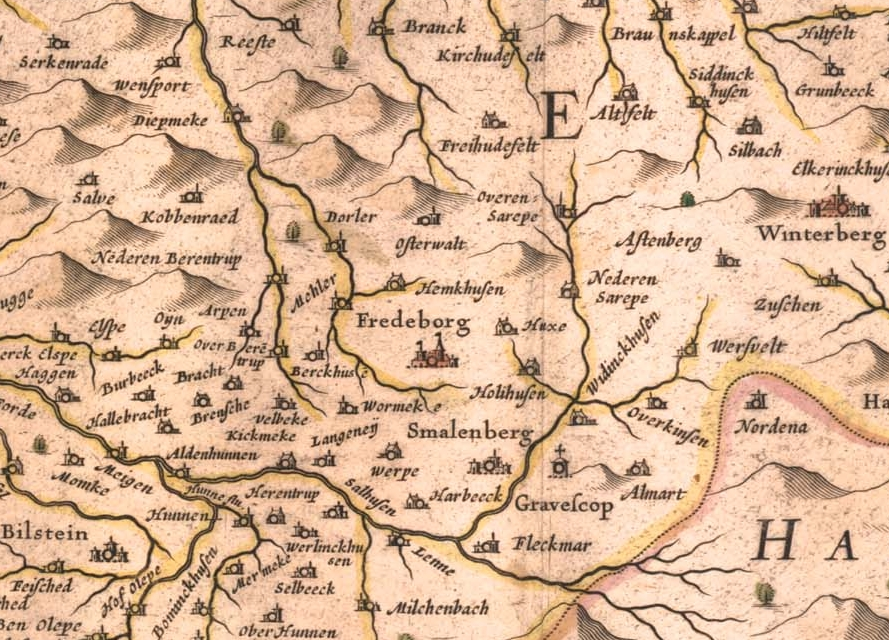
„Nordena“ 1645 - Westphalia Ducatus (Duchy of Westphalia)

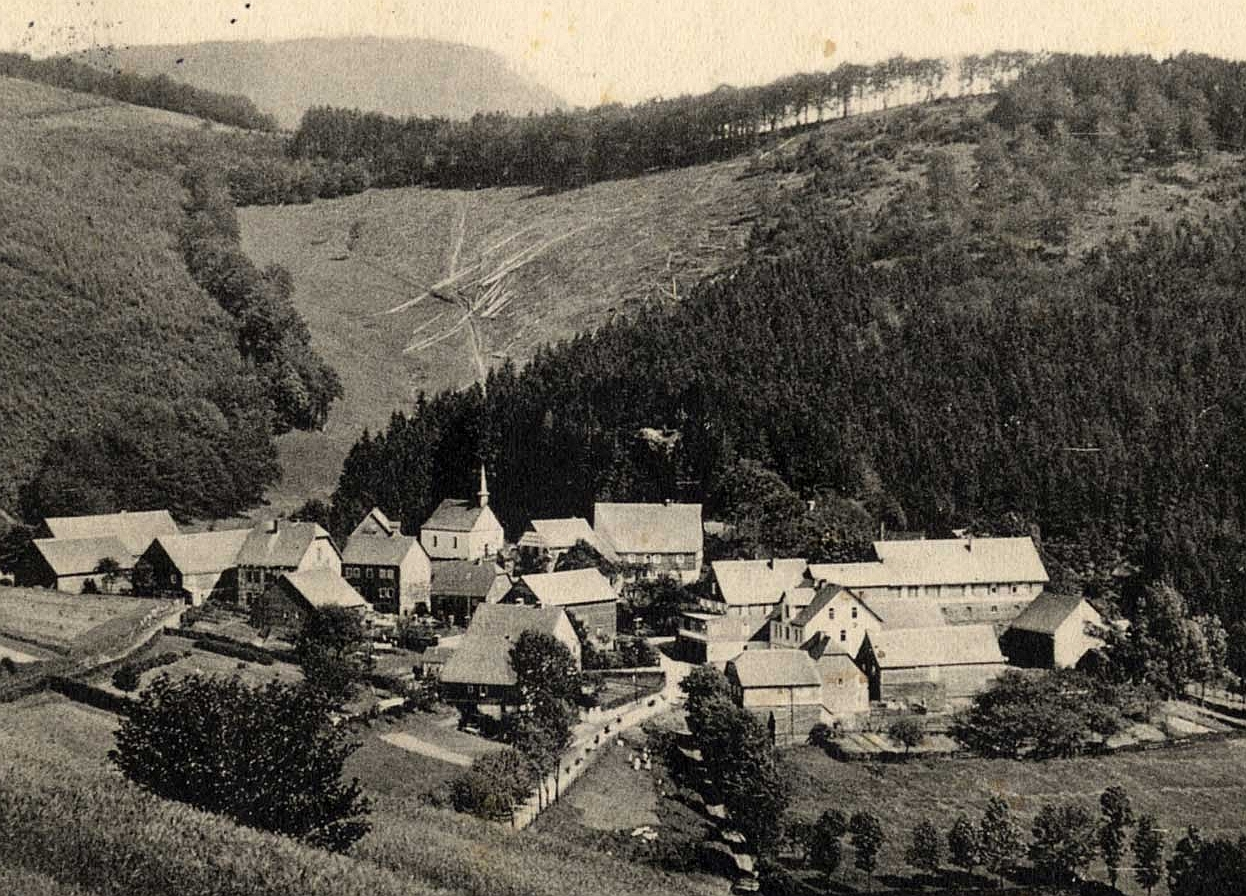
Nordenau 1914 (with the old chapel)

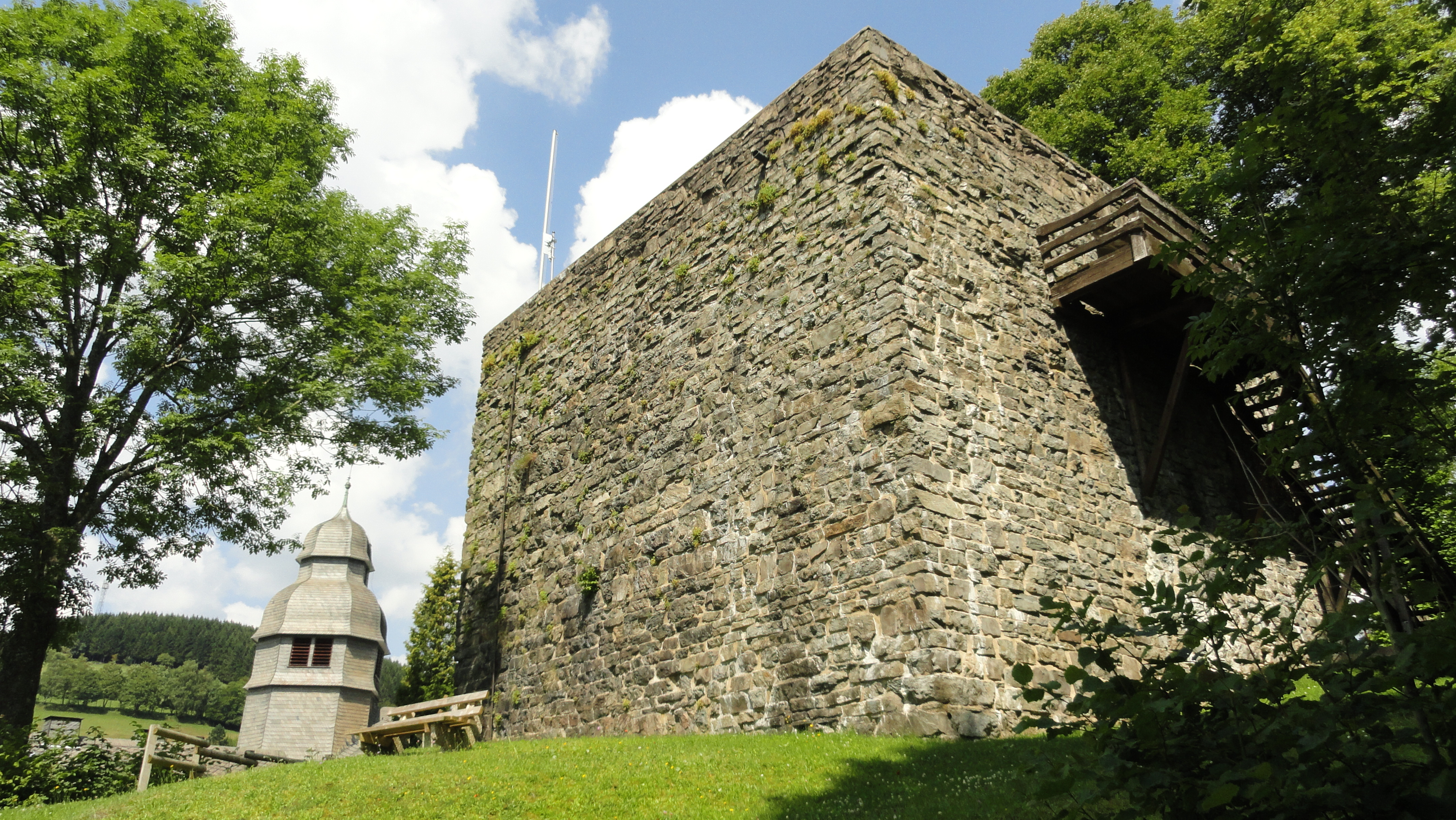
Rappelstein castle ruin

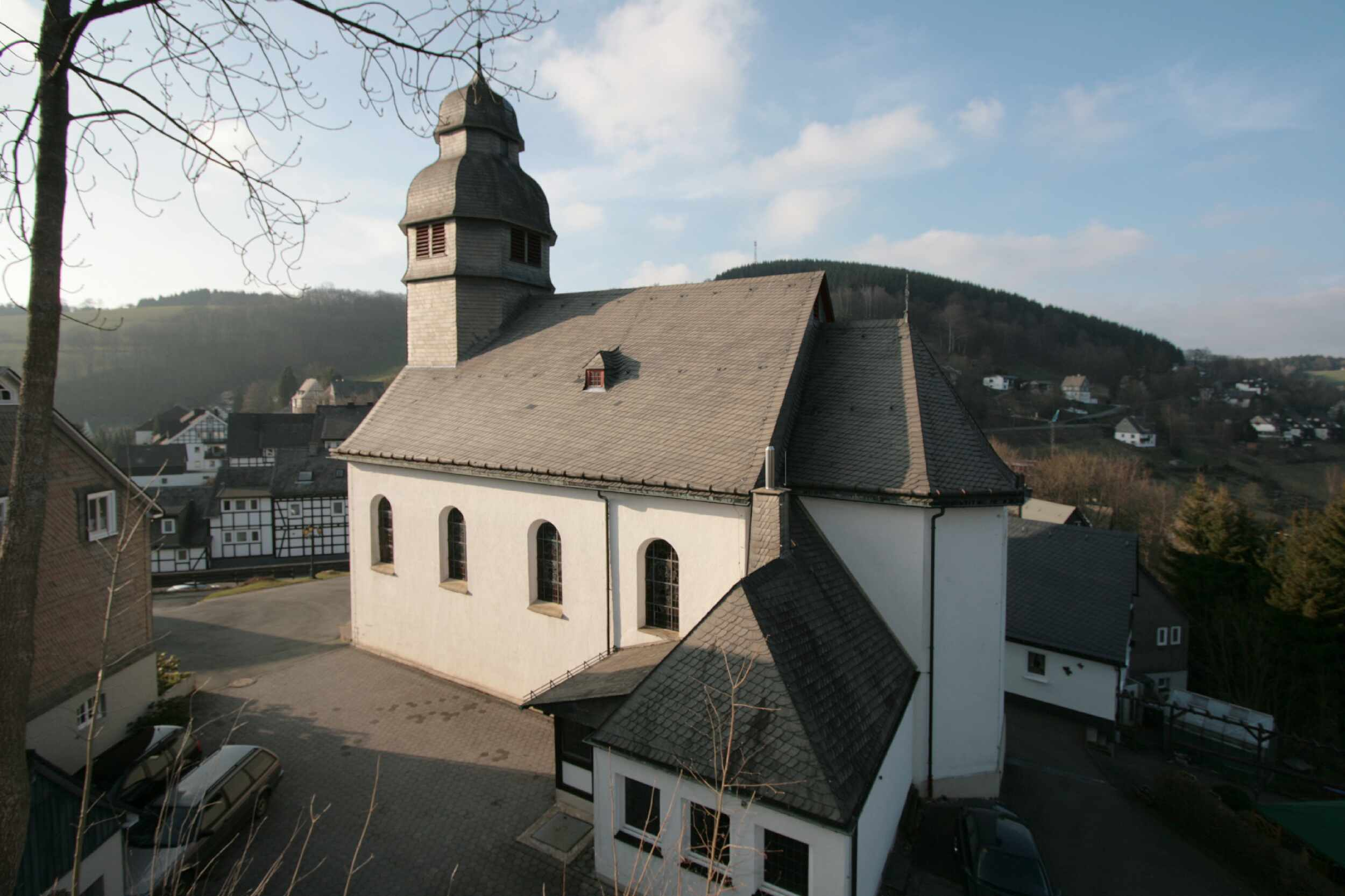
St. Hubertus Church
