= Rothaar Mountains =

Mountain range in North Rhine-Westphalia and Hesse, Germany

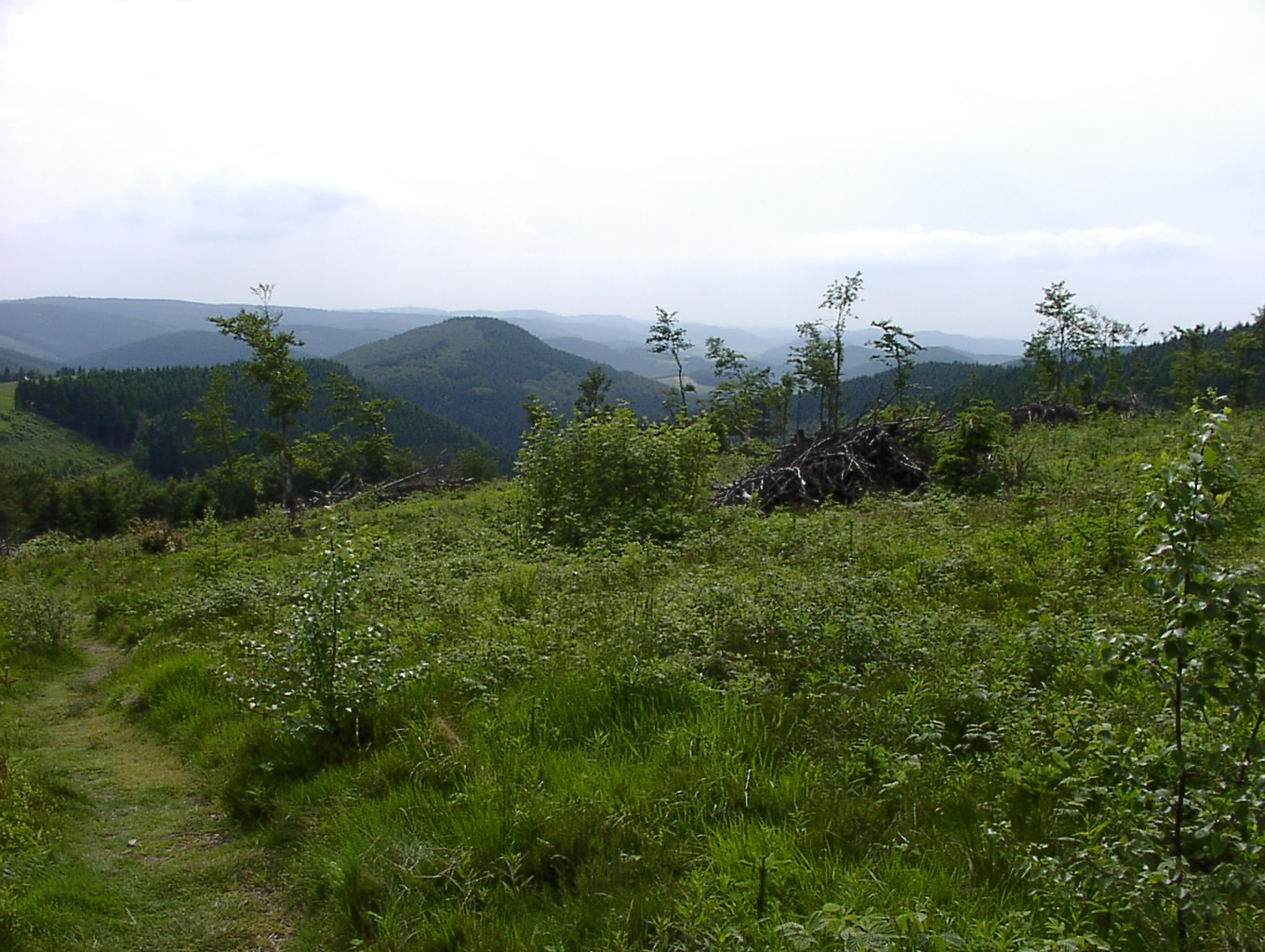
- Rothaar Mountains, view from Kahle Asten

Highest point
- Peak: Langenberg
- Elevation: 843 m above NN

Dimensions
- Area: 2,250 km^{2} (870 mi^{2})

Geography
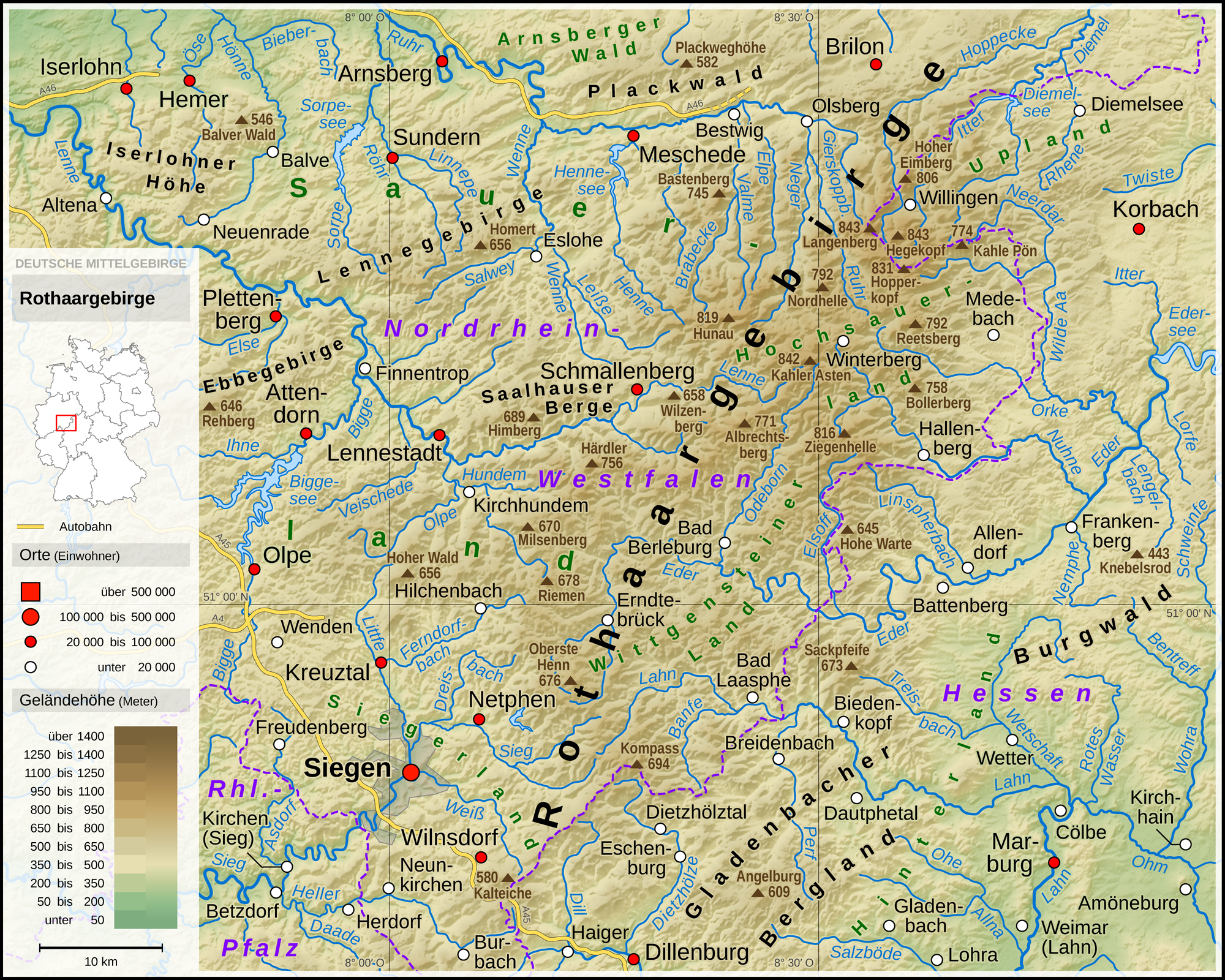
- Map of the Rothaar Mountains
- Country: Germany
- States: North Rhine-Westphalia and Hesse
- Range coordinates: 51°05′N 8°15′E
- Parent range: Rhenish Slate Mountains

Geology
- Orogeny: low mountains

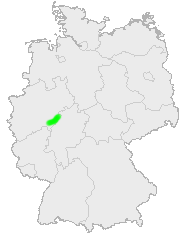
The location of the Rothaar Mountains in Germany

The Rothaar Mountains (German: Rothaargebirge, pronounced [ˈʁoːthaːɐ̯ɡəˌbɪʁɡə], also Rotlagergebirge), or Rothaar, is a low mountain range reaching heights of up to 843.1 m in North Rhine-Westphalia and Hesse, Germany.

It is believed that its name must once have been Rod-Hard-Gebirge, or "the cleared forest mountain range", as the range has nothing whatsoever to do with the colour red (rot in German), nor with hair (Haar).

== Geography ==
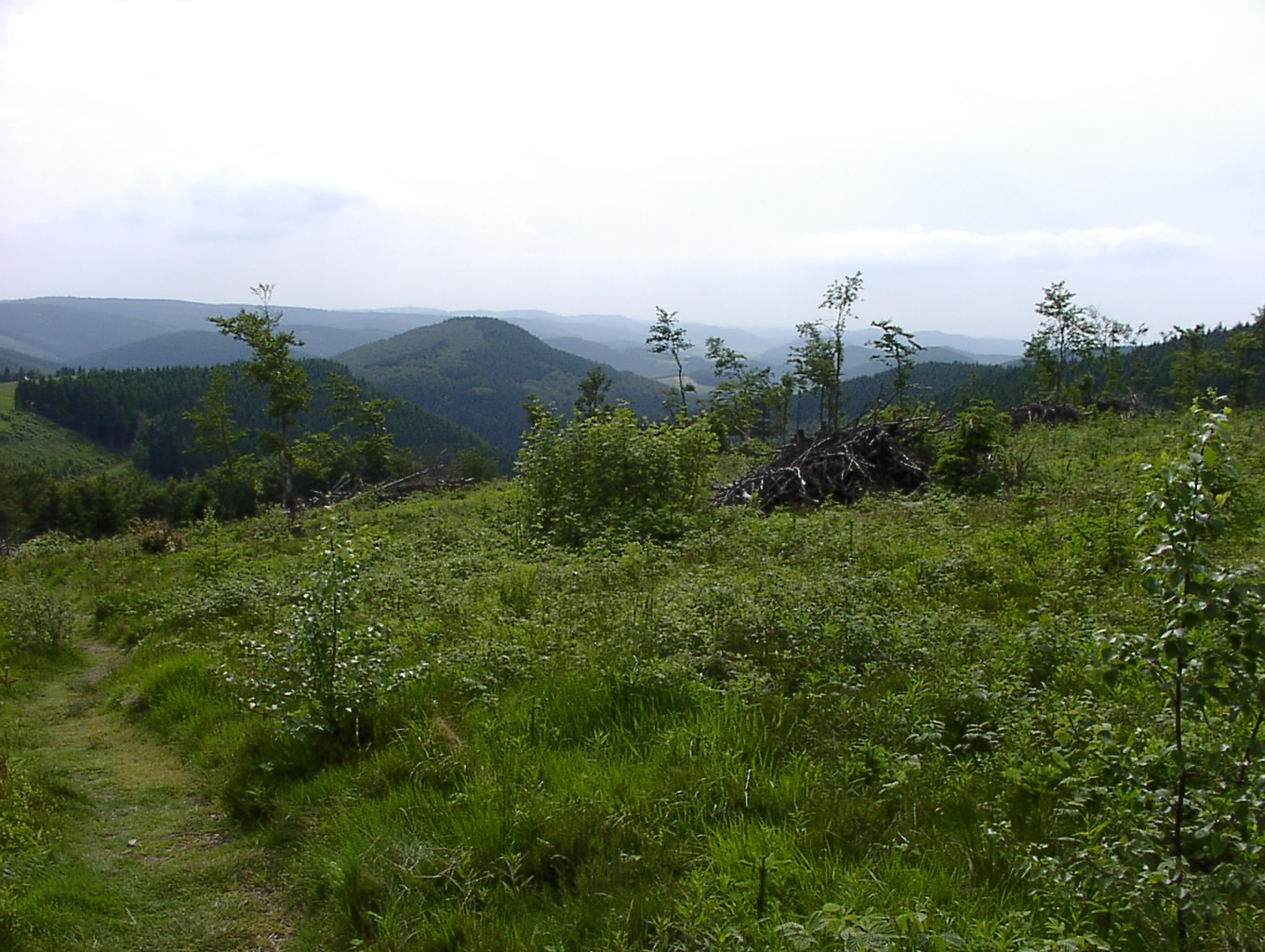
View from Kahler Asten, one of the range's highest peaks

=== Location ===
The thickly wooded Rothaar, rich in mineral deposits, is found (mostly) in Westphalia sandwiched between the Sauerland Mountain Range to the north, the Upland mountain range (northeastern foothills of the Rothaar) to the northeast, Wittgenstein Land to the southeast and the Siegerland to the southwest. The range's southeastern foothills are in Hesse, and is the only part that lies outside of Westphalia. It stretches from the upper Eder and the Lenne from the Kahler Asten (841 m) southwest of the Winterberg Tableland (Winterberger Hochfläche) some 30 km to the southwest and drops off steeply towards the west, but much less sharply towards the east.

The Rothaar is a narrow, banklike mountain chain, mostly over 600 m forming a large part of the Rhine Massif (Rheinisches Schiefergebirge). The highest peak in the Rothaar Mountains is the Langenberg at 843.1 m. The elevation of other mountains in the area are only slightly lower so that the individual mountains that make up the range hardly stand out from each other.

The Rothaar Mountains are more or less co-extensive with the Rothaar Mountain Nature Park, parts of which do, however, reach into adjacent areas.

=== Bodies of water ===
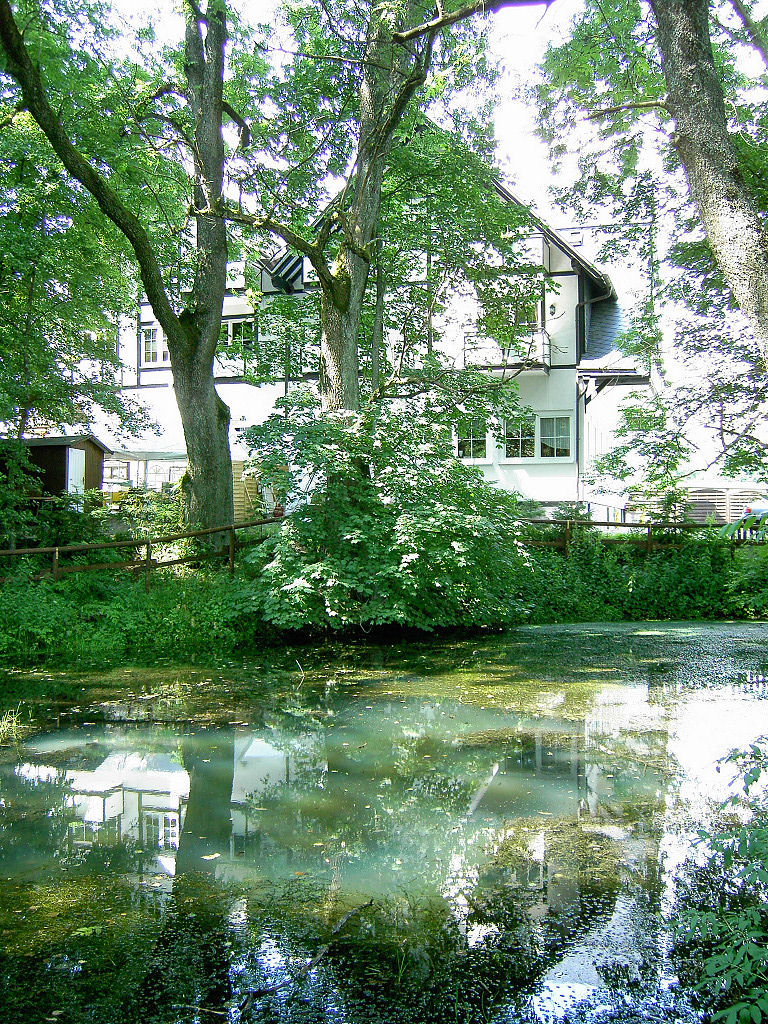
Source of the Lahn

In the northern Rothaar rise, among others, the rivers Diemel, Lenne, Neger, Nuhne, Odeborn, Orke, Ruhr, Wenne and Wilde Aa. In the south rise the Dill, Eder, Ferndorfbach, Ilse, Lahn and Sieg. Over the range runs the Rhine-Weser watershed. In the farthest southwest of the Rothaar are the Obernau and Breitenbach dams.

=== Mountains ===
Among the best known (but not necessarily the highest) of the Rothaar's peaks, which consist partly of porphyry, are (including all "Achthunderter", or "eight-hundreders", sorted by height):

- Langenberg (843.1 m)
- Hegekopf (842.9 m)
- Kahler Asten (841 m)
- Clemensberg (838 m)
- Ettelsberg (837.7 m)
- Hopperkopf (831 m)
- Hunau (818 m)
- Ziegenhelle (816 m)
- Wallershöhe (812 m)
- Bremberg (809 m)
- Hillekopf (801 m)
- Hoppernkopf (801 m)
- Ruhrkopf (696 m)
- Sackpfeife (674 m)
- Dreiherrnstein (673 m)
- Milsenberg (670 m)
- Ederkopf (655 m)
- Giller (653 m)
- Kindelsberg (617.9 m)

The German Wikipedia has a more exhaustive list of the Rothaar's many peaks.

=== Places ===
In the Rothaar Mountains and/or the Rothaar Mountain Nature Park or their outskirts are found, among others, these municipalities:

- Bad Berleburg
- Bad Laasphe
- Biedenkopf
- Erndtebrück
- Hallenberg
- Hatzfeld
- Hilchenbach
- Kirchhundem
- Kreuztal
- Lennestadt
- Medebach
- Schmallenberg
- Winterberg

== Activities ==
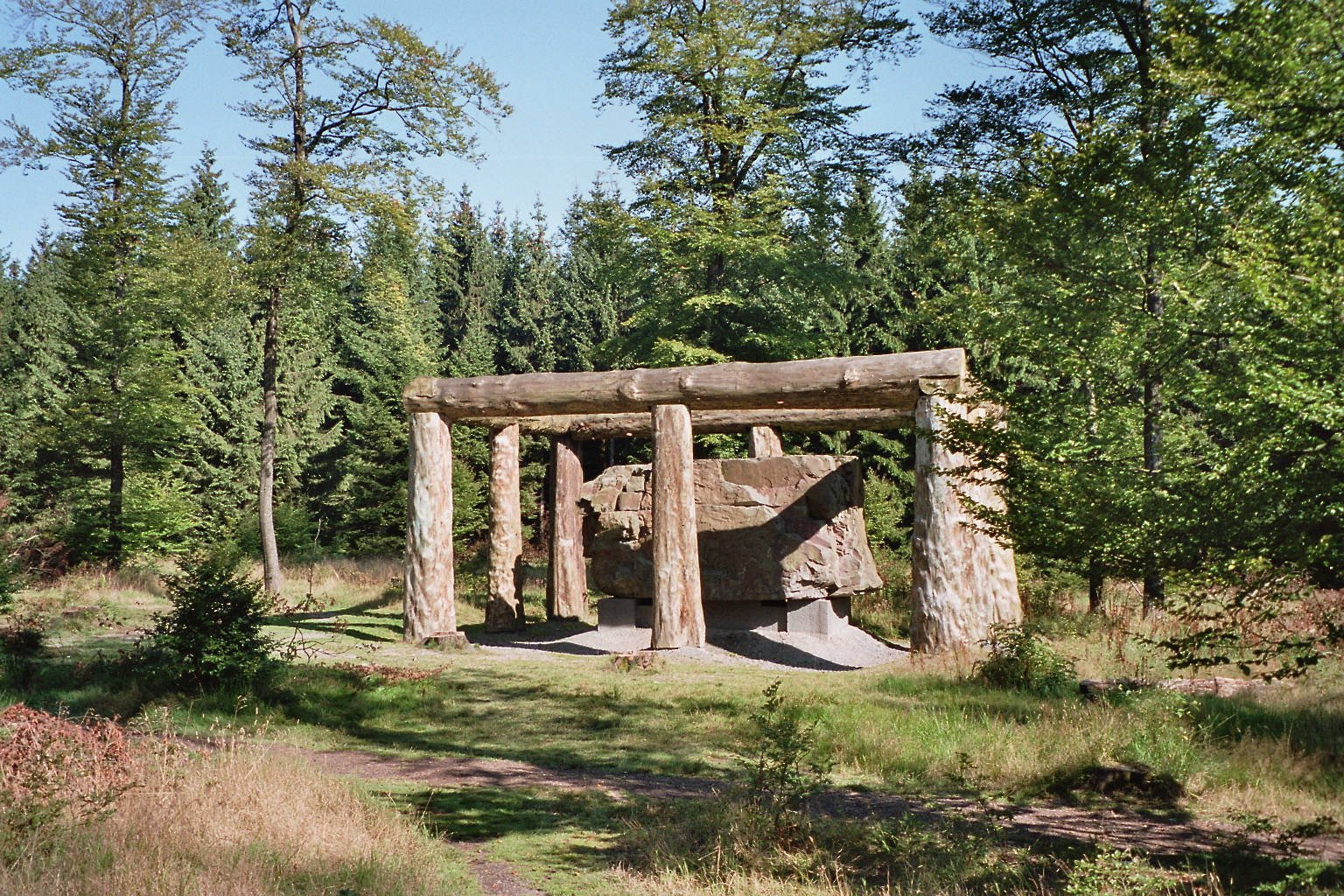
Sculpture Stone-Age Man near Bad Berleburg-Kühhude

Many hiking trails run through the Rothaar Mountains, including the Rothaar Path, a 154 km-long trail through the heights, and the Waldskulpturenweg ("Forest Sculpture Way") along which are found various sculptures and other artworks by different artists.

In winter, many sporting opportunities beckon visitors to the range. Suitable facilities for this include the Postwiesen skiing area (near Neuastenberg), the Skiliftkarussell Winterberg and Snow World Züschen.

Within or on the outskirts of the Rothaar are found the Panorama-Park Sauerland and Fort Fun Abenteuerland amusement parks.

== Free-ranging wisents ==
In 2011 began the reintroduction of free-ranging wisents into the Rothaar Mountains. The project is, however, not without its controversy in the region, with cultivators in particular worrying about possible damage that the creatures might do.
