= Bernd Noack =

German physicist

Bernd Rainer Noack
- Born: 17 February 1966; Korbach, Germany
- Education: University of Göttingen
- Known for: Machine learning control; Reduced-order modeling; Aerodynamic optimization
- Awards: CNRS Excellence Award (2014-2018); Fellow of the American Physical Society (2012); ANR Senior Chair of Excellence (2010); Richard von Mises Award (2005); Hugo Denkmeier Award (1993)
- Scientific career
- Fields: Closed-loop flow control for transport systems
- Workplaces: Harbin Institute of Technology, Shenzhen; CNRS, Paris; TU Berlin; UTRC, Max Planck Society; German Aerospace Center

Bernd Rainer Noack (born 17 February 1966, Korbach, West Germany) is a German physicist. His research and teaching area is closed-loop flow control for transport systems. Focus is placed on machine learning control and model-based nonlinear control using reduced-order modelling and nonlinear (attractor) closures. Currently investigated configurations include wakes, mixing layers, jets, combustor mixing and aerodynamic flows around cars and airplanes.

== Life ==
Bernd R. Noack is a National Talent and Distinguished Professor at Shenzhen University, China. Secondary affiliations include Shenzhen Technology University, Harbin Institute of Technology, Technical University Berlin and University Carlos III of Madrid. He received his degree as diploma physicist from the Georg-August-University, Göttingen, in 1989. He stayed on to receive his physics doctorate in 1992 under Helmut Eckelmann. In the sequel, he had positions at the Max-Planck-Institut für Strömungsforschung, Göttingen, the German Aerospace Center, Göttingen, the University of Göttingen, and the United Technologies Research Center (East Hartford, CT, USA) before he joined Technische Universität Berlin heading the group "Reduced-Order Modelling for Flow Control" at the School V "Transport and Machine Systems". Later, he was Director of Research CNRS at Institute PPRIME, Poitiers and Laboratoire d'Informatique pour la Mécanique et les Sciences de l'Ingénieur (LIMSI), Paris-Saclay, France. In 2020, we became National Talent Profesor at Harbin Institute of Technology.

== Scientific work ==
Focus of Noack's work are physical theories and mathematical methods for turbulence control. One direction is the development of control-oriented nonlinear models and associated control design building on the Galerkin method, originally proposed by Boris Galerkin. He proposed the first mathematical Galerkin model for the two- and three-dimensional cylinder wake from Hilbert space considerations. Subsequent works employ the proper orthogonal decomposition and propose numerous enablers accounting for the pressure term, subscale turbulence and departures from the training set.

He has distilled three major facets of nonlinearity in dynamical least-order models:

- The role of the base flow in saturation of fluctuation level building on J. T. Stuart's mean field theory and generalizing the Landau model for a supercritical Hopf bifurcation.
- The interaction of two coherent structures at different frequencies via the base flow leading to coupled Landau oscillators.
- A statistical closure for the energy cascade of broadband dynamics via a finite time non-equilibrium thermodynamics (FTT) framework.

The associated control laws can be derived from energy considerations and have been applied to streamlined and bluff bodies.

Recently, Noack works on implementing the powerful methods of machine learning in turbulence control. Major breakthroughs are learning the control law in real-world experiments with Machine learning control (MLC) and an automated learning the control-oriented dynamical gray-box model from experimental data.

Supplementary projects include data visualization, phenomenological models, vortex models and entropy-based optimization in addition to a spectrum of model-free and model-based control approaches. The breadth of this research builds on a network of cross disciplinary collaborations with leading teams.

== Books and review articles ==
- Bernd R. Noack; Marek Morzynski; Gilead Tadmor, eds. (2011). Reduced-Order Modelling for Flow Control. Springer-Verlag. ISBN 978-3-7091-0758-4.
- Thomas Duriez; Steven L. Brunton; Bernd R. Noack (2016). Machine Learning Control - Taming Nonlinear Dynamics and Turbulence. Springer-Verlag. ISBN 978-3-319-40624-4.
- Steven L. Brunton; Bernd R. Noack (2015). "Closed-loop turbulence control: Progress and challenges". Applied Mechanics Reviews. 67 (5): 050801. Bibcode:2015ApMRv..67e0801B. doi:10.1115/1.4031175. S2CID 120783766.
- Steven L. Brunton; Bernd R. Noack; Petros Koumoutsakos (2020). "Machine learning for fluid mechanics". Annu. Rev. Fluid Mech. 52: 477–508. arXiv:1905.11075. Bibcode:2020AnRFM..52..477B. doi:10.1146/annurev-fluid-010719-060214. S2CID 166227999.
