= Axel A. Weber =

German economist, professor, and banker

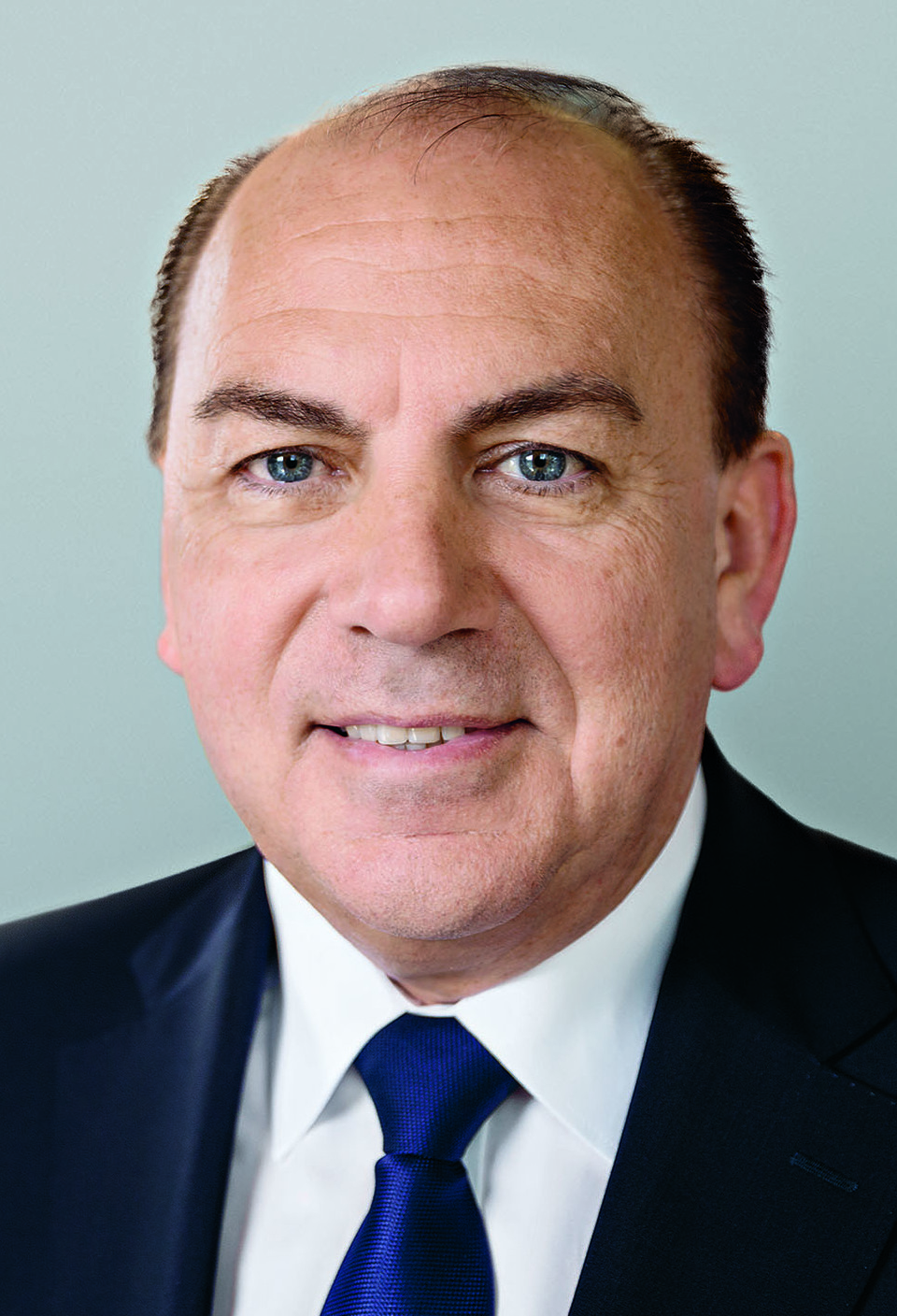
- Weber in 2014

8th President of the German Bundesbank
- In office 30 April 2004 – 30 April 2011
- Preceded by: Ernst Welteke
- Succeeded by: Jens Weidmann

Personal details
- Born: 8 March 1957 (age 69) Kusel, West Germany
- Education: University of Siegen; University of Konstanz
- Occupation: Economist, Professor, Banker

Axel Alfred Weber (born 8 March 1957) is a German economist, professor, and banker. He is currently a board member and chairman of Swiss investment bank and financial services company, UBS Group AG, and has announced his resignation effective 7 April 2022.

He was the president of the Deutsche Bundesbank and a member of the European Central Bank Governing Council from 30 April 2004 to 30 April 2011. He is also a member of the Group of Thirty.

== Early life and education ==
Weber was born in Kusel, Germany. He studied economics and public administration at the University of Constance from 1976 to 1982 and graduated with a master's degree (Diplom) in economics.

After obtaining a Dr. rer. pol. in economics from the University of Siegen, Germany in 1987, Weber pursued his scientific studies abroad at the University of London and Tilburg University. Between 1992 and 1993, Weber spent an academic year in Washington, D.C. while teaching. In 1994, Weber received his habilitation in Economics from the University of Siegen. He also holds honorary doctorates from the University of Duisburg-Essen and the University of Konstanz.

== Career ==
From 1982 to 1988 Weber worked as research assistant in the field of monetary economics at the University of Siegen and was awarded a Doctorate in 1987. After gaining his habilitation at the University Siegen in 1994, he was appointed Professor of Economic Theory at the University of Bonn, and moved to the Goethe University Frankfurt in 1998. He was also the Director of the Center for Financial Studies in Frankfurt am Main from 1998 to 2001 and of the Center for Financial Research at the University of Cologne from 2001 to 2004.

In 2001 Weber was appointed Professor of International Economics at the University of Cologne, and from 2002 to 2004 he was a Member of the German Council of Economic Experts. From 2002 until 2011 he was a member of the expert advisory panel to the Deutsche Bundesbank.

=== Bundesbank ===
Weber was appointed President of the Deutsche Bundesbank by the German finance minister Hans Eichel as successor of the resigning Ernst Welteke, and elected as a member of the Governing Council of the European Central Bank in 2004.

In this capacity, Weber also served on the Board of Directors for the Bank for International Settlements (BIS), as German governor of the International Monetary Fund and a member of the G7 and G20 Ministers and Governors during this time. From 2010 to 2011 he was also a member of the Steering Committees of the European Systemic Risk Board and the Financial Stability Board.

On 9 February 2011, Weber announced his resignation from his chairmanship of the Bundesbank, effective 30 April 2011, a year before the expiry of his term of office. The move was seen as throwing open the candidacy for president of the European Central Bank to others to succeed Jean-Claude Trichet starting 1 November 2011.

=== University of Chicago ===
From 2011 to 2012 Weber was a visiting professor at the University of Chicago Booth School of Business. As visiting professor, he taught two three-hour sessions of the course "Central Banking: Theories and Facts" on Mondays, in fall 2011. He attended the Federal Reserve Bank of Kansas City's Economic Policy Symposium in Moran near Jackson Hole, Wyoming, in summer 2011.

=== UBS AG ===
Weber was elected to the Board of Directors of the Swiss bank UBS AG at the 2012 AGM held on 3 May 2012 and of UBS Group AG in November 2014. He succeeded Kaspar Villiger as chairman of the Board of Directors. His appointment was announced in mid-2011, when Villiger had been expected to retire in 2013. Weber announced his resignation from UBS AG on 6 April 2022.

Weber has chaired the Governance and Nominating Committee since 2012 and became Chairperson of the Corporate Culture and Responsibility Committee in 2013.

== Other activities ==
=== Regulatory agencies ===
- China Banking and Insurance Regulatory Commission (CBIRC), Member of the International Advisory Council
- China Securities Regulatory Commission (CSRC), Member of the International Advisory Council
- Monetary Authority of Singapore (MAS), Member of the International Advisory Panel

=== Corporate boards ===
- Temasek Holdings, Member of the International Panel

=== Non-profit organizations ===
- Center for Economic and Policy Research (CEPR), Distinguished Fellow (since 2019)
- Institute of International Finance (IIF), Chairman of the Board (since 2016)
- German Institute for Economic Research (DIW), Chairman of the Board of Trustees (since 2015)
- Berggruen Institute, Member of the Council for the Future of Europe (since 2011)
- Swiss Finance Council, Member of the Board
- Trilateral Commission, Member of the European Group
- Swiss Bankers Association, Member of the Board
- International Monetary Conference, Member of the Board
- Financial Services Professional Board, Member of the Board
- Group of Thirty, Member
- Avenir Suisse, Member of the Board of Trustees
- IMD Foundation, Member of the Board
- European Financial Services Roundtable (EFR), Member
- European Banking Group, Member
- Monetary Authority of Singapore, Member of the International Advisory Panel
- University of Zurich, Member of the Advisory Board of the Department of Economics
- Zukunft Finanzplatz, Member of the Advisory Board

== Recognition ==
In late 2015, Weber was awarded the title of "European Banker of the Year 2014" in Germany by the International Association of Economic Journalists called the Group of 20+1. In the same year, Weber was also awarded the first Prix Marjolin Prize by the SUERF Council of Management.

== Personal life ==
Weber is married to Diane Chatterton and has two children.

== Selected works ==
- Weber, Axel A. (1988). Neue Klassische Makroökonomie, rationale Erwartungen und kontemporäre Information: Theoretische Analyse, ökonometrische Testprobleme und empirische Evidenz für die Bundesrepublik Deutschland unter Verwendung des Kalman-Filters. Schriften zurangewandten Ökonometrie. Vol. Heft 20. Frankfurt am Main: Verlag Haag & Herrchen. ISBN 3-89228-266-8.
- Weber, Axel A.; Agénor, Pierre-Richard; Miller, Marcus; Vines, David, eds. (1999). The Asian Financial Crisis: Causes, Contagion and Consequences. Cambridge University Press.
- Weber, Axel A.; Artis, Michael, eds. (1999). The Euro: A Challenge and Opportunity for Financial Markets. Routledge.
- Weber, Axel A. "Monetary Policy and Credibility: Theories and Facts". Mimeo.
