= Wilhelmine Halberstadt =

German educator and author

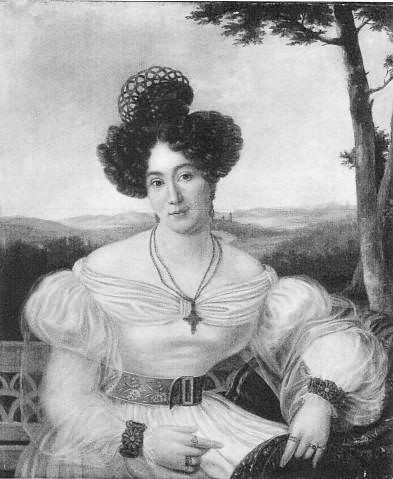
- Wilhelmine Halberstadt Artist unknown, ca 1835
- Born: Elisabeth Friederike Wilhelmine Halberstadt; 24 January 1776; Corbach, Hesse-Cassel, Holy Roman Empire
- Died: 11 March 1841; Kassel, Hesse, German Confederation
- Occupations: educator education pioneer author
- Parent(s): Carl Franz Halberstadt; Maria Christiane Speirmann/Schmidt

Wilhelmine Halberstadt (24 January 1776 – 11 March 1841) was a German educator and author.

== Biography ==
Elisabeth Friederike Wilhelmine Halberstadt was born in Corbach, a small town in the uplands west of Kassel. Carl Franz Halberstadt, her father, was a lawyer employed as a secretary by the Count Reuss. He had previously traveled extensively in Europe and later crossed the Atlantic, acquiring land in America. Upon his return, he married the childless widow Maria Christiane Speirmann (born Schmidt). After Maria's father was imprisoned for embezzlement of the family fortune, Carl Franz Halberstadt travelled back to America to sell his possessions there. During his journey, he was involved in a shipwreck after which he was never seen again.

Wilhelmine Halberstadt was intelligent and keen to educate herself quickly in order that she might become a teacher, which would enable her to bring an income into the family home to support her mother and siblings. Between 1806 and 1812 she was employed as a tutor-governess by the family of Johann Matthaeus Tesdorpf in Lübeck. During her time there, in 1808, Halberstadt wrote "Über Würde und Bestimmung der Frauen" ("On the dignity and fate of women"). She then returned to live with her mother and attempted to set up her own school in Trier. There, Halberstadt became engaged to Karl Borbstädt, a former government tax official and author. Together, they began to plan the creation of a major educational institution, possibly in Berlin. Karl Borbstädt took a trip to Berlin to make administrative arrangements, but he died from a sudden illness during the journey.

The Rhine Province (including Trier) suffered crop failures in 1816 and 1817. (Note: The "Volcanic winter" of 1816 and 1817 has subsequently been attributed to the 1815 eruption of Mount Tambora.) This led to austerity, which led to a growth in inter-denominational strife. In 1822 Halberstadt closed the school and began to work as a private tutor for families she knew and trusted. In 1822 she published "Gemälde häuslicher Glückseligkeit" (loosely,"Images of Domestic Happiness and Joy"), a substantial work on pedagogy, assembling her accumulated experience of teaching into just four volumes. Short of funds, she sent an unsolicited copy to the Russian emperor, (Note: The Russian royal family was of German provenance. The czar's empress-wife was from Karlsruhe. There was a large German-speaking expatriate community in Saint Petersburg at this time and it is likely that the czar would have read German without difficulty.) who in return sent her a substantial payment "in recognition".

It was not only the Emperor of Russia who had been impressed by her contributions. Frederick William III of Prussia had also become an admirer of her educational achievements in his Rhine Province, and made arrangements to provide her with a pension. When Halberstadt became aware of the king's intentions, she quickly wrote to him, asking if he would instead be willing to fund her new project. Her plan was to select the most suitable girls from orphanages and train them to become elementary school teachers. Girls from higher social classes were not, she insisted, really suitable for work as elementary school teachers. Her project was timely, since the Prussian King had recently appointed the kingdom's first Minister for Education. Halberstadt's project met with approval and the Education Minister, Karl vom Stein zum Altenstein received instructions to look at her proposals sympathetically. Due to ongoing religious disputes in the Rhine Province it was still not possible to pursue the project in Trier.

In 1823, Halberstadt set up an educational institution for daughters of the wealthy in Kassel. She also published a second edition of her book "On the dignity and fate of women" and a new teaching book: "Schulbuch, als erste Uebung im Lesen und Denken, nach der Lautmethode. Ein Geschenk für fleißige Kinder." ("Textbook, as a first exercise in reading and thinking phonetically. A gift for industrious children"). These two books were both widely welcomed, and the first of them was translated into French. In October 1831, she opened the first "Halberstädtsche Free school" for poor girls, followed by the "Halberstädtsche Fräuleinstiftung für vaterlose Töchter" ("Halberstadt young ladies' foundation for fatherless daughters") in 1833. The schools enjoyed great success for decades, and was taken over by the municipal schools board in 1876. To fund these two schools, she launched the "Ehrentempel europäischer Classiker" ("Honoured temple of European classics") monthly journal in 1835, which appeared in German, French and English. Through her foundation thousands of children were educated, clothed, fed and trained for life.
