= Korbach =

Korbach Hansestadt Korbach
- Town
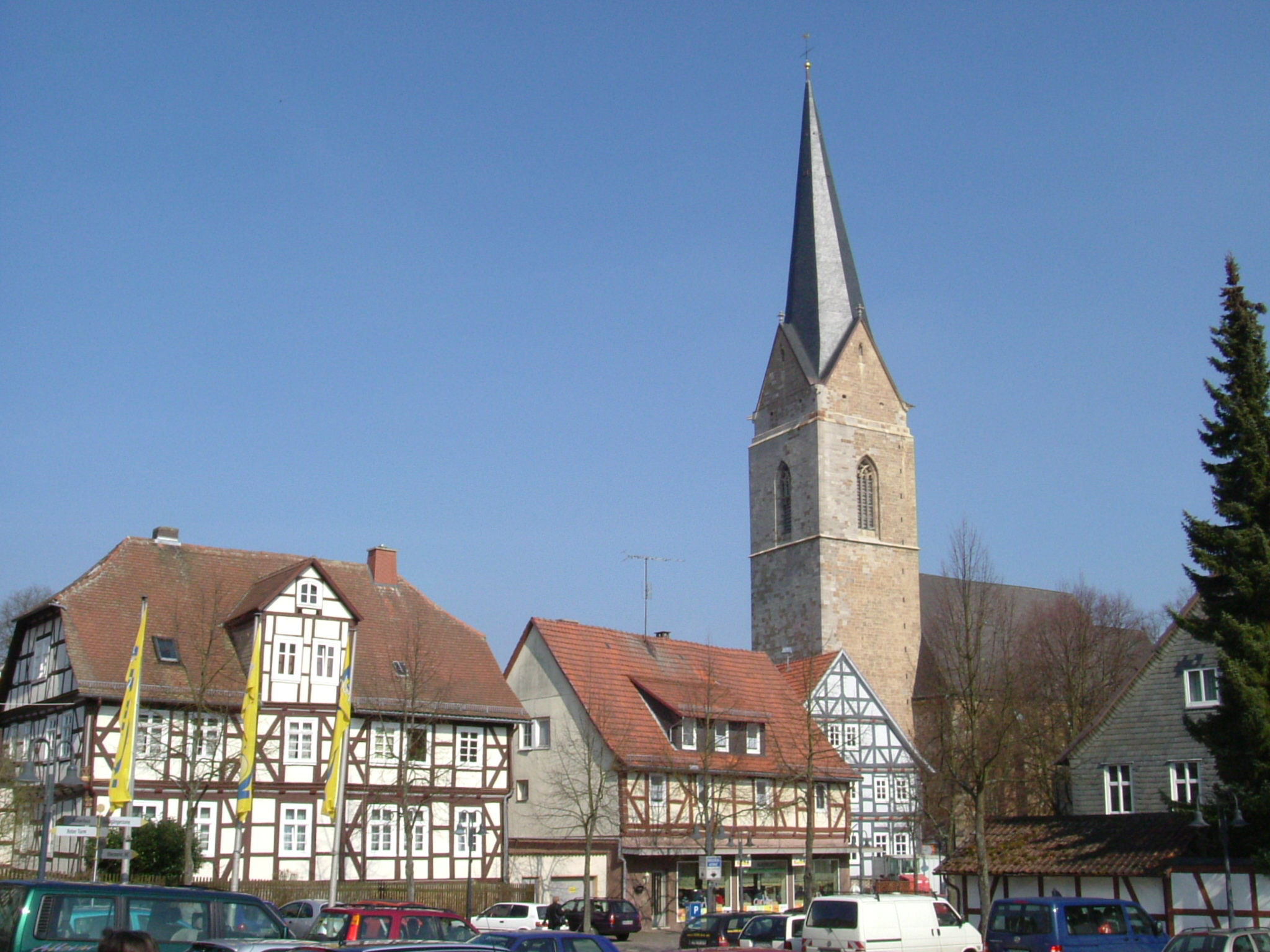
- Saint Nicholas Church

- Coat of arms

- Location of Korbach within Waldeck-Frankenberg district
- Interactive map of Korbach
- Location within Germany Location within Hesse
- Coordinates: 51°17′N 8°52′E
- Country: Germany
- State: Hesse
- Admin. region: Kassel
- District: Waldeck-Frankenberg

Government
  - Mayor (2018–24): Klaus Friedrich

Area
  - Total: 124.11 km^{2} (47.92 sq mi)
- Elevation: 384 m (1,260 ft)

Population (2025-12-31)
  - Total: 22,789
  - Density: 183.62/km^{2} (475.57/sq mi)
- Time zone: UTC+01:00 (CET)
  - Summer (DST): UTC+02:00 (CEST)
- Postal codes: 34497
- Dialling codes: 05631
- Vehicle registration: KB
- Website: Stadt Korbach

Korbach (German pronunciation: [ˈkɔʁbax]), officially the Hanseatic City of Korbach (German: Hansestadt Korbach), is the district seat of Waldeck-Frankenberg in northern Hesse, Germany. It is over a thousand years old and is located on the German Timber-Frame Road. In 2018, the town has hosted the 58th Hessentag state festival.

== Geography and geology ==
Korbach lies at the north-east edge of the Rhenish Slate Mountains (here known as the Waldeck'sches Upland, the second word being a German proper name, not the English word "upland"). Neighbouring towns and municipalities are, clockwise from the northwest, Willingen, Diemelsee, Twistetal, Waldeck, Vöhl, Lichtenfels (likewise all in Waldeck-Frankenberg) and Medebach (Hochsauerlandkreis in North Rhine-Westphalia).

The town lies on an unwooded tableland called the Waldecker Tafel that once harboured a great many wild chickens, leading to the townsfolk's nickname as "Feldhühnerchen" ( ≈ "little field chickens"). Not only the main town, but also outlying centres such as Lelbach (615 inhabitants), Lengefeld (512 inhabitants), Nordenbeck (195 inhabitants), Ober-Ense (228 inhabitants) and Nieder-Ense (272 inhabitants) lie on the Waldecker Tafel or at its edge. In the eastern part of the municipal area, where the outlying centres of Helmscheid (202 inhabitants), Strothe (250 inhabitants) and Meineringhausen (947 inhabitants) lie, begins the North Hesse Hills (nordhessisches Hügelland), which stretch from the Rhenish Slate Mountains to the Habichtswald range west of Kassel. In the west lie the constituent municipalities of Alleringhausen (91 inhabitants), Eppe (686 inhabitants), Nieder-Schleidern (193 inhabitants) and Hillershausen (334 inhabitants) in the foothills of the Sauerland. The highest peaks in the Korbach municipal area are the Widdehagen (635 m) near Rhena (584 inhabitants) and the Eisenberg (562 m), which despite its name – meaning "Iron Mountain" – is well known for gold-bearing ore found there. Perhaps more fittingly, the outlying municipality lying on the Eisenberg is called Goldhausen (329 inhabitants).

Through the main town runs the Kuhbach, a tributary to the Itter, itself a tributary to the Eder. In a grammatical quirk, the name "Kuhbach", which most German speakers would regard as masculine, is often locally inflected as though it were feminine – die Kuhbach instead of der Kuhbach.

The Korbacher Spalte, a 20 m-deep, up to 350 cm-broad and roughly 1 km-long cleft in the Earth's surface near Korbach, discovered in 1964, has yielded important fossil finds, indeed the only finds of Procynosuchus in the Northern Hemisphere.

Worth seeing is the Korbach Village Church, which stands in the middle of the town. Likewise worth visiting is the old castle inside the "Hühnenkeller" ringwall near Lengefeld.

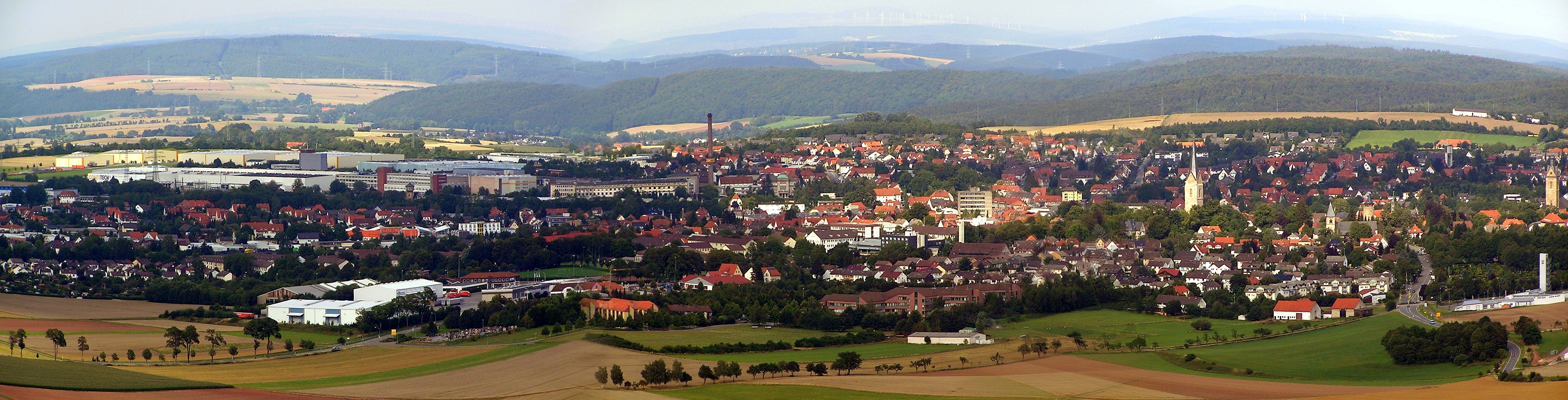
Panorama of Korbach from Eisenberg hill

== Population ==
(each time at 31 December)

- 1998 - 24,510
- 1999 - 24,552
- 2000 - 24,515
- 2001 - 24,490
- 2002 - 24,537
- 2003 - 24,503
- 2004 - 24,540

== History ==
=== Protohistory ===
On the hill upon which Saint Kilian's Church was later built, a Carolingian Imperial court already stood by 800. The name Korbach (earlier "Corbach") comes from the Old High German Curbechi ("choosing place on the brook"). Curbechi had its first documentary mention in 980 when Otto II, Holy Roman Emperor yielded Korbach, Lelbach and Rhena to Corvey Abbey. Also in other parts of the municipal area, clues can be found about settlement in early times, as for instance on the Wipperberg near Lengefeld.

=== Middle Ages and Early Modern Times ===
In 1188, the Bishop of Paderborn granted town rights under Soest law. Owing to Korbach's location at the crossroads of the Cologne-Leipzig and Frankfurt-Bremen commercial roads, handicrafts and trade quickly developed and Korbach blossomed. The Old Town was soon no longer big enough to house all the townsfolk. The merchants therefore settled in two new towns, the Upper and Lower New Town, outside town limits, although these towns did eventually merge into one. In the 14th century, Saint Kilian's Church (Kilianskirche) was built in the Old Town and St. Nicholas's Church (Nikolaikirche) in the New Town. In 1377, the Old Town and the New Town were at last united, and at the former townline arose the united town's town hall, which still stands today. In 1349, Charles IV, Holy Roman Emperor – although at the time he was still only King of the Romans – came to town for a visit. Korbach joined the Hanse and was first mentioned as a member town of the Hanseatic League in 1469, making Korbach the only town in the Bundesland of Hesse to have been a member of the Hanseatic League. In 1414, a double ring of walls surrounding the whole town was finished. Five town gates kept watch over the town's approaches: the Tränketor, the Dalwigker Tor, the Enser Tor, the Lengefelder Tor and the Berndorfer Tor. Only the Enser Tor still stands today. The Padberger Fehde from 1413 to 1418 was the culmination of the long border disputes and repeated attacks by the Lords of Padberg on the territory of the county of Waldeck and in particular the city of Korbach. This feud found a temporary with this conflict.

With the coming of the Reformation, the town, and indeed the whole County of Waldeck, became Protestant. Even nowadays, Korbach is still mostly Protestant, even though beginning in the 19th century, a great number of Catholics moved into the town. On the other hand, the outlying municipalities to the west on the boundary with North Rhine-Westphalia are almost wholly (Hillershausen) or mostly (Nieder-Schleidern, Eppe) Catholic.

In the Thirty Years' War, Korbach had to make ever greater contributions to the troops who were passing through. By the time the war ended, only half the town's houses were still fit to live in, and the town's population had fallen from 2600 to 1100. In 1664, a great town fire burnt almost all the residential houses down. There is only one half-timbered house in town today that was built before the fire. The Gothic stone churches and the stone warehouses from that time, on the other hand, are still well preserved.

==== Nieder-Ense ====
The constituent municipality of Nieder-Ense had its first documentary mention about 1010.

=== Modern Times ===
During the Seven Years' War the town was the site of the Battle of Korbach on 10 July 1760 between the French under the command of St. Germain and the Hanoverian, British and Hessian allies under Karl Wilhelm Ferdinand, the Hereditary Prince.

It was only towards the end of the 18th century that a modest prosperity was restored to Korbach. The town first achieved a new economic boom late in the 19th century. Contributing to this in no small measure was the new railway to Kassel that opened in 1893. Moreover, the industrialist Louis Peter established in 1907 a rubber and tire factory in Korbach. The town was mostly spared any great damage in further wars, particularly the two world wars. After the Second World War, the population rose sharply as those driven out of formerly German territories to the east flooded into town.

The rubber factory continues to dominate the development of the city. It is one of the production sites of Continental AG, one of the major companies in its sector.

== Politics ==
=== Town council ===
The town council's 31 seats are apportioned thus, in accordance with municipal elections held on 6 March 2016:

SPD	10 seats
CDU	8 seats
FWG	5 seats
Greens	3 seats
FDP	3 seats
Aktive Bürger	2 seats

=== Coat of arms ===
Korbach's civic coat of arms might heraldically be described thus: Party per fess, above, in azure a bishop argent with shawl and mitre trimmed Or, in his hand dexter upraised a book Or, in his hand sinister a crozier Or dexter, below, in Or a halved eight-pointed star sable.

The arms come from the town's oldest known seal, from 1236. The human figure in the chief is the Bishop of Paderborn, who granted Korbach town rights in 1188, although it could be his successor Bishop Wilbrand, who had the townsfolk swear him in as their overlord in 1227. The aforesaid seal was made not long after this. There is an erroneous belief that the human figure is Saint Kilian, the town's patron saint, but this is believed to be rather unlikely, as the figure looks like a bishop.

The eight-pointed star – only half of which appears in these arms – is quite a common charge in civic heraldry in Waldeck, the region in which Korbach lies, for the simple reason that it was the arms borne by the Counts of Schwalenberg-Waldeck, who were the town's rulers as the bishops' vassals beginning in 1227. The star shown on the original seal, however, was six-pointed (and again, halved). This was eventually changed to the eight-pointed version still seen now, to match the star in the counts' arms.

The objects that the bishop holds changed in the early days, with some old seals showing him without the book. Also, the original 1236 seal shows him with the two objects transposed, holding the staff in his right hand, not the book. Since 1377, however, the composition still seen today seems to have been settled on. The colours were chosen in 1947.

== Twin towns – sister cities ==
Korbach is twinned with:

- Avranches, France (1963)
- Waltershausen, Germany (1990)
- Pereslavl-Zalessky, Russia (1990)
- Pyrzyce, Poland (1998)
- Vysoké Mýto, Czech Republic (2000)

== Transport ==
Korbach lies on Federal Highways (Bundesstraßen) 251 (Kassel-Brilon) and 252 (Marburg-Paderborn), which both conveniently connect to the Korbach bypass (road). There is no direct connection to the Autobahn network anywhere in the municipal area, the nearest interchanges being on the A 44 near Diemelstadt and Zierenberg, either way about 30 km away. The town is also connected by state highways (Landesstraßen) to Medebach and Diemelsee.

Korbach is a railway hub where once four railway lines met, one through Brilon-Wald to the Ruhr area (the Uplandbahn), one southwards through Frankenberg to Marburg (the Untere Edertalbahn and Burgwaldbahn), one northeastwards through Volkmarsen to Kassel and one southeastwards through Waldeck to Wabern (the Ederseebahn). The Ederseebahn from Bad Wildungen to Korbach is out of service. The stretch running to Kassel was reopened on 4 October 1998 (then one of the first examples in Germany of a railway line being reactivated). The stretch as far as Korbach Süd was reopened on 29 September 1999 and the Untere Edertalbahn (stretch between Korbach Süd and Frankenberg) was reopened in September 2015, to connect with the Kellerwald-Edersee National Park. There is now a direct link from Korbach to Marburg with trains running every two hours.

Korbach is somewhat remarkable for a town its size in having two railway stations on the same line that are also both in service. Since the original one ("Hauptbahnhof" – Main Station) lay too far from the Old Town, a further station ("Korbach-Süd") was built 1.5 km farther south.

In 1997, a bus service was instituted in Korbach with two looping routes that partly intersect. These buses run at 40-minute intervals, thereby meet each other at the main railway station every 20 minutes. The system also connects important places within the town, such as the inner town, the town hospital or the school centre to both routes.

There are two airfields in Korbach, used only for sport flying and gliding.

== Sights ==
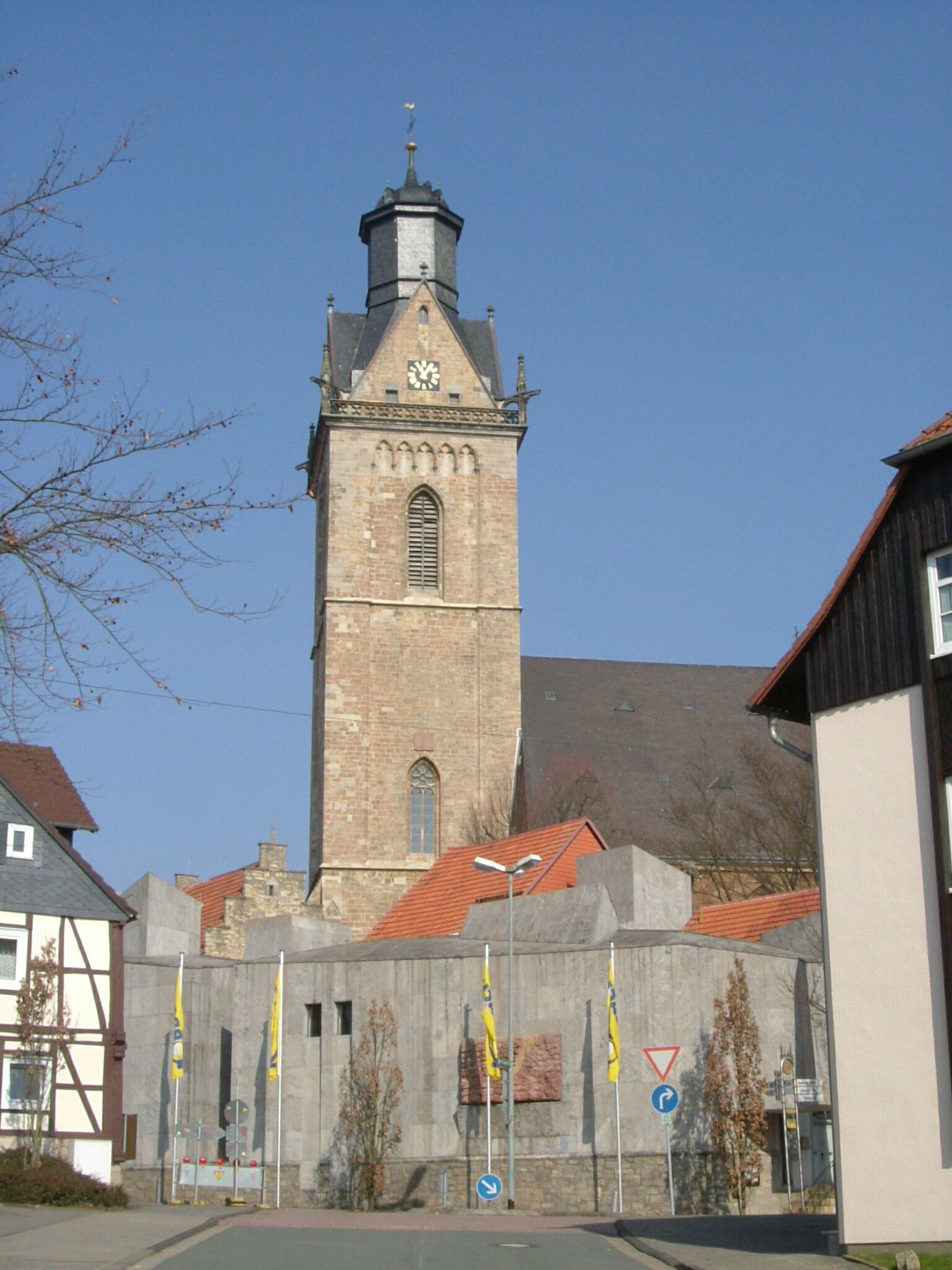
Kilianskirche church

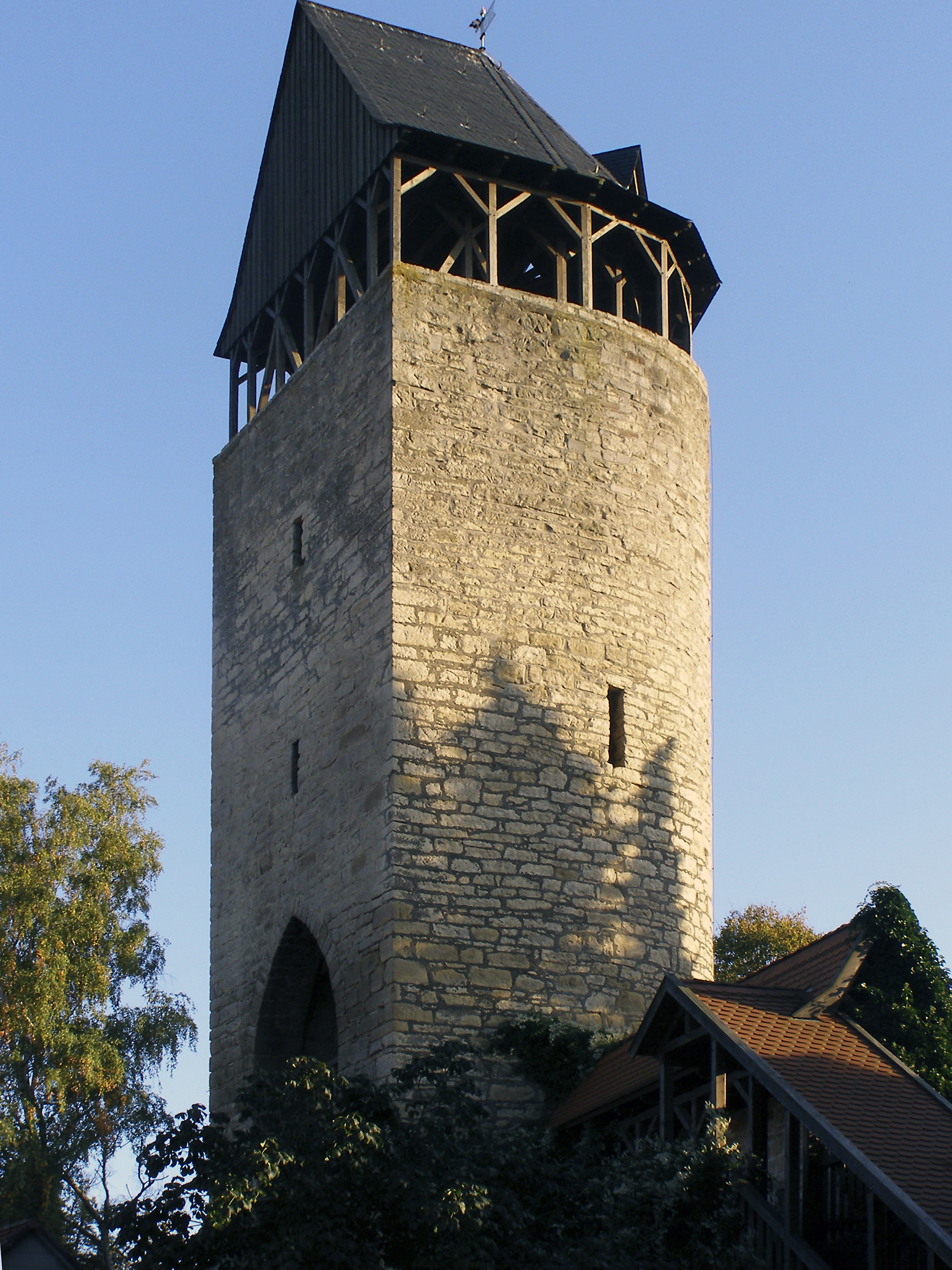
Tylenturm tower

- Wolfgang-Bonhage-Museum Korbach dedicated to the city's history.
- Kilianskirche (1450) and Nikolaikirche (1460)
- Alte Landesschule (1579)
- A medieval pillory
- Well preserved town wall and old town
- Several medieval stone buildings (warehouses)
- The bronze Night Watchman ("Nachtwächter") in the pedestrian precinct
- The Gold Trail (Goldspur), passing goldmining sites and explaining the history of gold at the Eisenberg.
- Nieder-Ense Church, built between 1130 and 1140, with Baroque altar by Josias Wolrad Brützel about 1700.
- Visitors' Mine, illustrating a goldminer's situation in the Middle Ages and his everyday work.
- Georg-Viktor Tower (tower), 24 m high, affords a panoramic view into the Upland as far as the Eder Uplands (Ederbergland), and of Eisenberg Castle ruins.

== Festivals ==
- Kiliansmarkt
- Viehmarkt (cattle market)
- Altstadt-Kulturfest (Old Town Cultural Festival)
- Mittelalterlicher Markt (Medieval Market)
- Weihnachtsmarkt (Christmas Market)

== Notable people ==
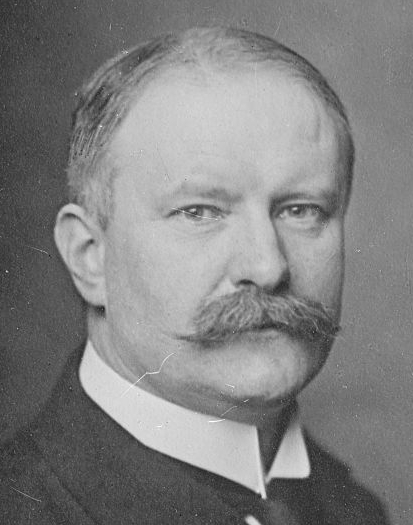
August Bier, 1908

- Daniel Angelocrater (1569–1635), theologian
- Konrad Samuel Schurzfleisch (1641–1708), historian, polymath and librarian
- Wilhelmine Halberstadt (1776–1841), educator and writer
- Christian Charles Josias von Bunsen (1791–1860), diplomat and scholar.
- Hermann Kümmell (1852–1937), surgeon
- August Bier (1861–1949), surgeon
- Horst Bingel (1933–2008), writer
- Ernst Welteke (born 1942), economist and politician
- Elke Heidenreich (born 1943), writer and television star
- Matthias Reim (born 1957), singer-songwriter
- Jochen Behle (born 1960), cross-country skiing trainer
- Bernd Noack (born 1966), physicist
- Rainer Schüttler (born 1976), tennis player
- Jan-Wilhelm Pohlmann (born 1986), politician

== Literature ==
- Stöcker, Hilmar G.: Niederense. Korbach : Stadtarchiv, 1978. 229 S. Waldecksche Ortssippenbücher; 16
