= Hermann Kümmell =

German surgeon (1852–1937)

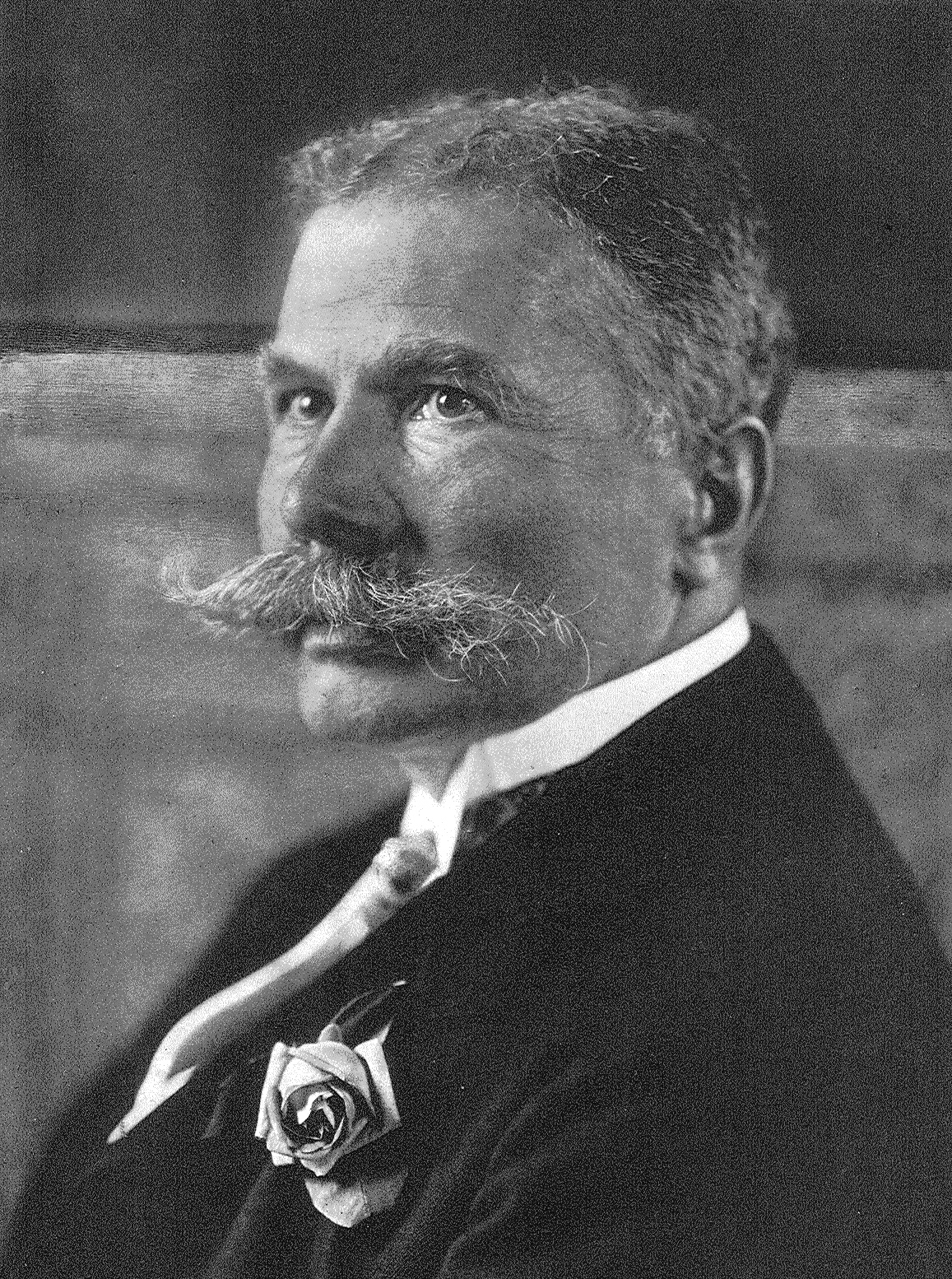
Hermann Kümmell (1905).

Hermann Kümmell (22 May 1852, Korbach, Waldeck-Pyrmont – 19 February 1937) was a German surgeon.

In 1875, he received his medical doctorate at Berlin, later working as an assistant physician to Max Schede (1833-1902) at the municipal hospital in Friedrichshain. In 1883 he became chief physician of the surgical department at the "Marienkrankenhaus" in Hamburg, and in 1895 was appointed surgeon-in-chief of the Allgemeinen Krankenhaus Hamburg-Eppendorf. In 1907 he became a titled professor, and in 1919 was a professor of surgery at the University of Hamburg.

Kümmell's work involved the treatment of fractures, bone implants and diseases of the spinal column. He also conducted extensive research of bladder and kidney disturbances, diseases of the chest, et al. He was among the first surgeons to advocate removal of the appendix in cases of recurrent appendicitis, and in 1886 attempted the first choledochotomy.

Among his numerous publications on surgery was Chirurgische Operationslehre, a three-volume work that he co-authored with August Bier (1861-1949) and Heinrich Friedrich Wilhelm Braun (1862-1934).

== Associated eponyms ==
- "Kümmell's disease": Also known as delayed post-traumatic osteonecrosis of a vertebral body.
- "Kümmell's point": A diagnostical point of appendicitis.
