= Ernst Welteke =

German economist and politician

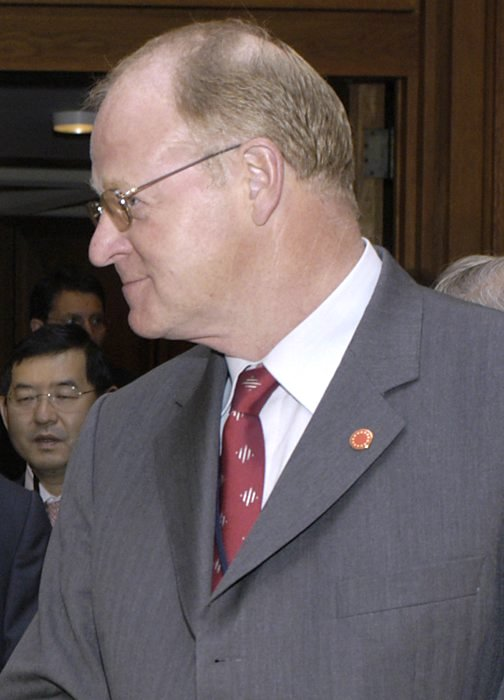

7th President of the German Bundesbank
- In office 1 September 1999 – 16 April 2004
- Preceded by: Hans Tietmeyer
- Succeeded by: Axel A. Weber

Personal details
- Born: 21 August 1942 (age 84) Korbach, Germany
- Party: Social Democratic Party of Germany
- Education: Goethe University Frankfurt
- Occupation: Economist

Ernst Welteke (born 21 August 1942) is a German economist and politician. He was the president of Deutsche Bundesbank from September 1999 until he resigned in 2004.

== Career ==
=== Political career ===
From 1974 until 1995, Welteke was a member of the Landtag of Hesse.

Welteke served as State Minister for Economic Affairs in the government of Minister President Hans Eichel of Hesse from 1991 until 1994. In 1994, he took over as State Minister of Finance.

=== President of the Bundesbank, 1999–2004 ===
Welteke was nominated by the government of Chancellor Gerhard Schröder as president of Bundesbank on 12 May 1999, and his term began on 1 September 1999.

When the Bundesbank studied the possibility of insider trading in relation to the September 11 attacks, Welteke stated that the German researchers found "almost irrefutable proof of insider trading", stating that "What we found makes us sure that people connected to the terrorists must have been trying to profit from this tragedy."

During his time in office, Welteke also publicly voiced disagreement with Schröder over the sale of the Bundesbank's gold reserves, at the time the world's second-largest after the United States. While Welteke proposed to set up a fund to distribute 5 billion euros from gold sales over five years for education and research purposes, Schröder held that was not enough to meet the country's spending needs.

In his role as president, Welteke was one of Germany's best-paid public officials, with an annual salary of 350,000 euros ($424,000). When the introduction of the physical euro took place on December 31, 2001, Welteke visited Berlin with his family for the celebration, and his stay at the Hotel Adlon was paid for by Dresdner Bank. In 2003, BMW, which owns a bank, paid for Welteke to spend a night on a yacht during the Monaco Grand Prix. Controversy over these incidents led to Welteke resigning from Bundesbank in April 2004.

In a statement published on the Bundesbank's Web site within hours of his resignation, Welteke accused Schröder's government of compromising the Bundesbank's independence. The Christian Democratic Union, then an opposition party, alleged that the German Finance Ministry had leaked details of Welteke's hotel bill. The government denied the allegations.

== Other activities ==
=== Corporate boards ===
- Banco Kwanza Invest, chairman of the Board (since 2008)
- Quantum Global, Member of the Advisory Board
- Fraport, Member of the Economic Advisory Group

=== Non-profit organizations ===
- Friedrich Ebert Foundation (FES), Member
- Official Monetary and Financial Institutions Forum (OMFIF), Member of the Advisory Board
