= Edertalschule Frankenberg =

Coordinates: 51°3′42″N 8°48′20″E

Edertalschule
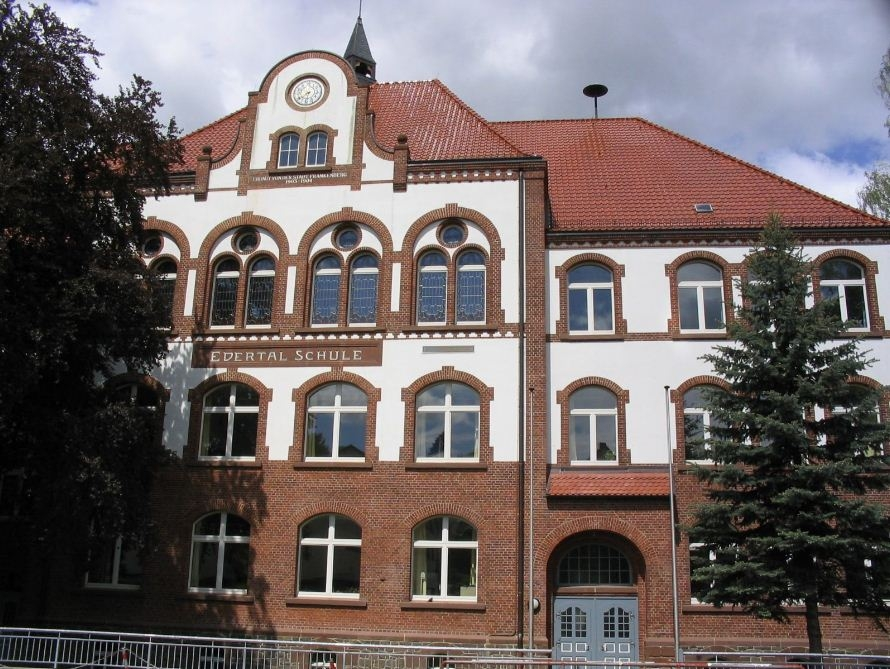

Location
- Frankenberg (Eder); Germany

Information
- Type: Gymnasium
- Established: 1922
- Headmaster: Claus-Hartwig Otto
- Enrollment: 1460 (as of 01.11.2012)
- Website: www.edertalschule.de

The Edertalschule is a traditional Gymnasium in Frankenberg (Eder). It is located in the southwestern part of the district Waldeck-Frankenberg in Hesse, and is the only Gymnasium in the old district of Frankenberg. Despite the more rural location, it is one of the largest Gymnasium in Hesse.

The Edertalschule has two specialty areas of emphasis that attract students, music and their MINT (Mathematik, Informatik, Naturwissenschaft und Technik) program.
