= Dortmund Signal-Iduna-Park station =

Railway station in Dortmund, Germany

Dortmund Signal-Iduna-Park
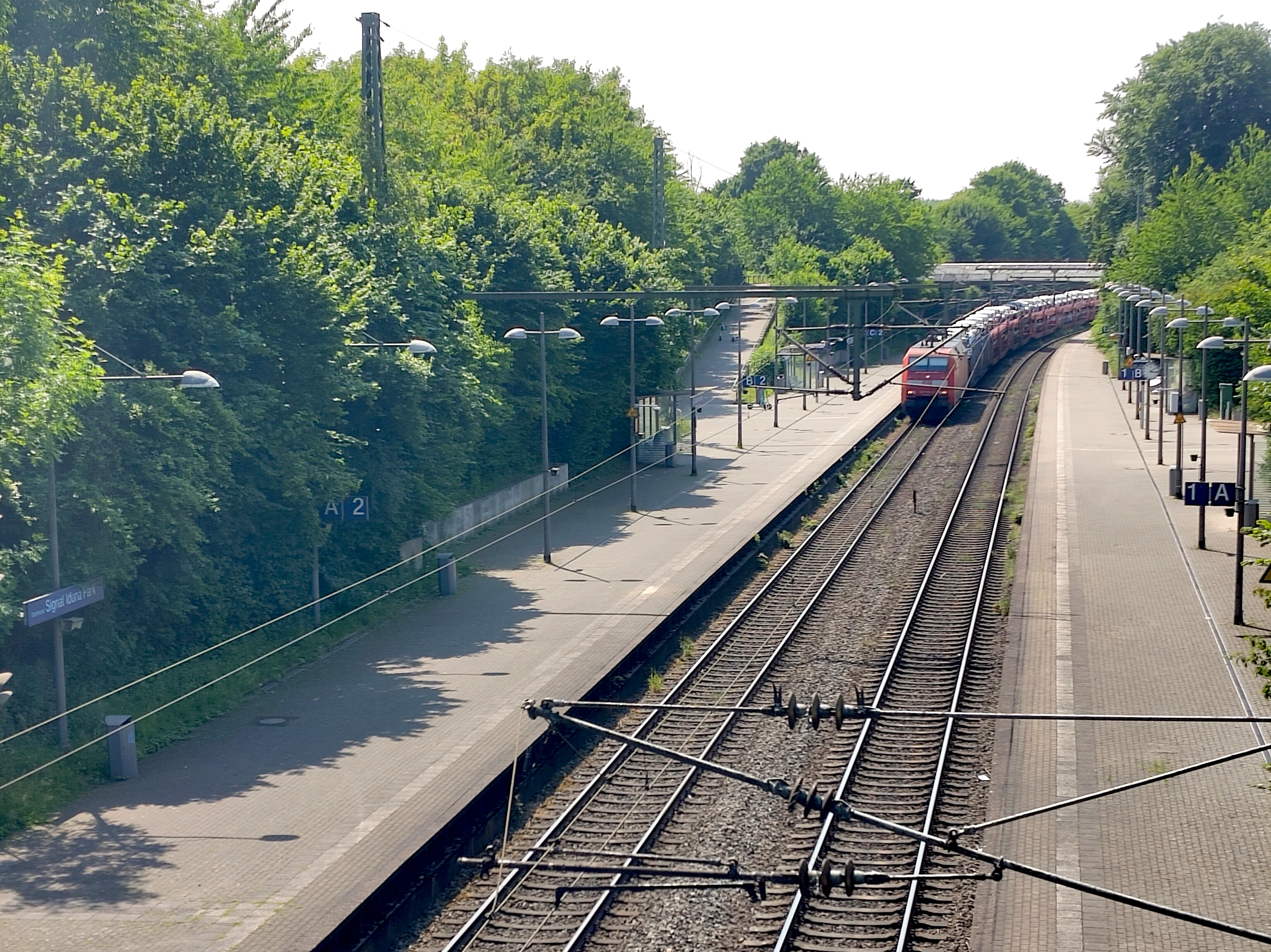
- Dortmund Signal-Iduna-Park in 2025

General information
- Location: Dortmund, NRW; Germany
- Coordinates: 51°29′26.4″N 7°27′27.3″E
- Owner: DB Netz
- Operator: DB Station&Service
- Lines: Dortmund–Iserlohn (Ardey Railway); Dortmund–Herdecke–Hagen (to Volme Valley Railway); Dortmund–Soest (Hellweg Railway)
- Platforms: 2 side platforms
- Tracks: 2
- Train operators: DB Regio NRW eurobahn

Construction
- Accessible: Yes

Other information
- Station code: 1297
- DS100 code: EDWH
- IBNR: 8001522
- Category: 4
- Fare zone: VRR: 372
- Website: www.bahnhof.de

Passengers
- 1,300

Services
Preceding station	DB Regio NRW	Following station
Dortmund Hbf Terminus	RB 52	Dortmund Tierpark towards Lüdenscheid
Dortmund Hbf Terminus	RB 53	Dortmund-Hörde towards Iserlohn
Preceding station		Following station
Dortmund Hbf Terminus	RB 59	Dortmund-Hörde towards Soest
Location
- Location within North Rhine-Westphalia

Dortmund Signal-Iduna-Park is a railway station on the Dortmund–Soest railway situated close to Signal Iduna Park stadium (also known as Westfalenstadion) in Dortmund in western Germany. The station was called Dortmund Westfalenhalle before December 2006. It is served by regional railway lines of Deutsche Bahn.

== Rail services ==
Line	Name	Route
RB 52	Volmetalbahn	Dortmund – Dortmund Signal-Iduna-Park – Hagen Hauptbahnhof – Lüdenscheid
RB 53	Ardey-Bahn	Dortmund – Dortmund Signal-Iduna-Park – Schwerte – Iserlohn
RB 59	Hellweg-Bahn	Dortmund – Dortmund Signal-Iduna-Park – Holzwickede – Unna – Soest

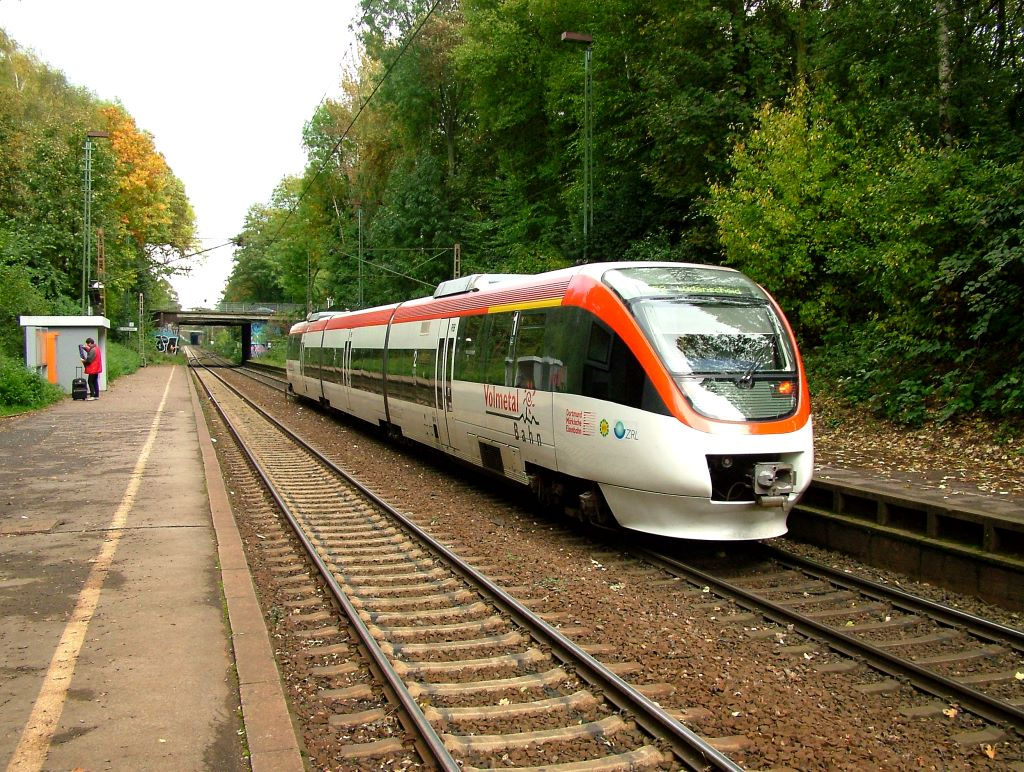
Dortmund-Märkische Eisenbahn train at the former Westfalenhalle halt, before the station was refurbished

When Borussia Dortmund play home games, the Dortmund-Sauerland-Express makes additional stops at this station.
