= Dortmund-Hörde station =

Railway station in Dortmund, Germany

Dortmund Hörde
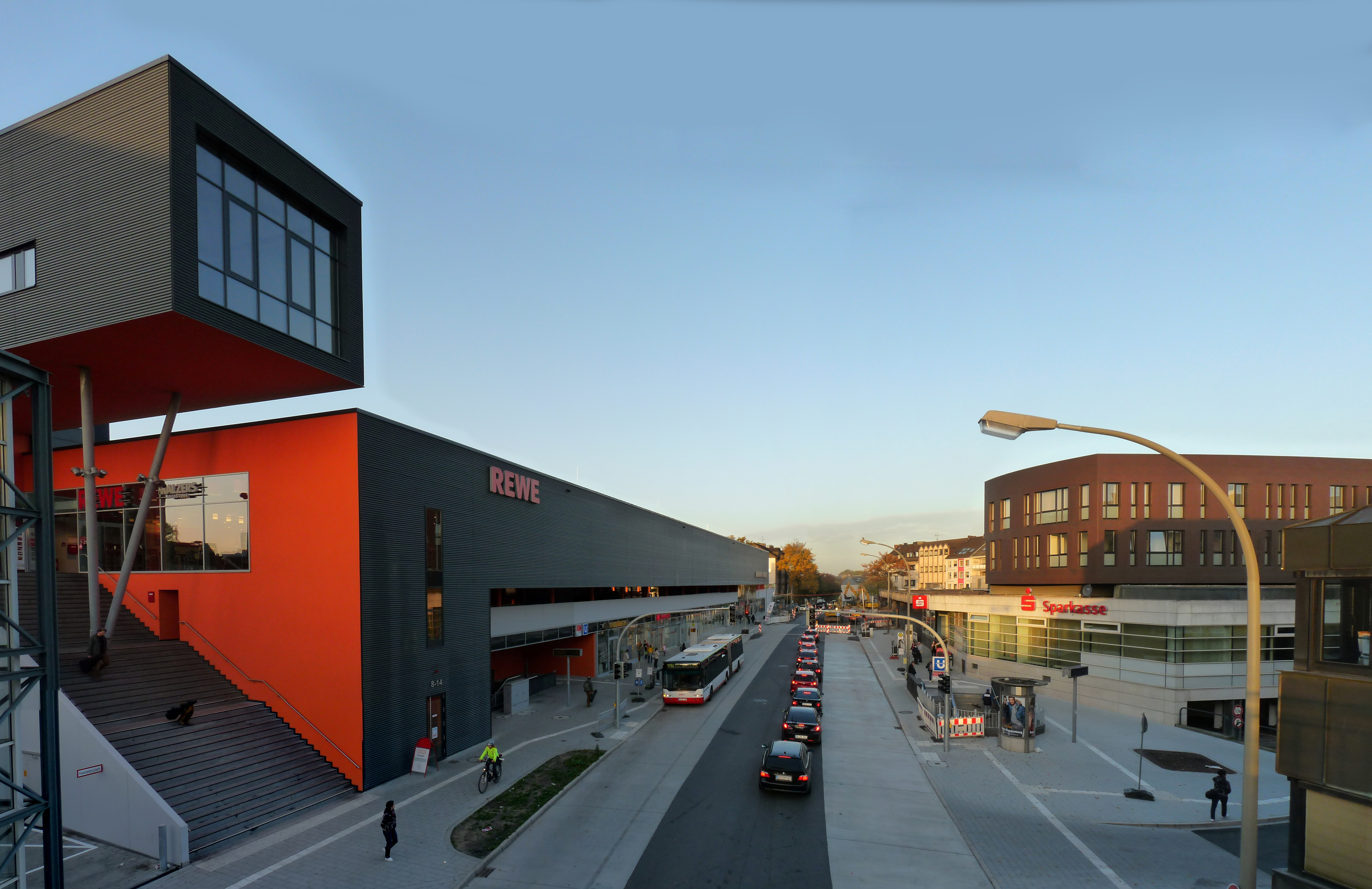

General information
- Location: Hörder Bahnhofstr. Dortmund-Hörde, NRW; Germany
- Coordinates: 51°29′16″N 7°29′59″E
- Owner: DB Netz
- Operator: DB Station&Service
- Lines: Dortmund-Soest (KBS 431); Dortmund-Iserlohn (KBS 433); Dortmund-Winterberg (KBS 438)
- Platforms: 4

Construction
- Accessible: Yes

Other information
- Station code: 1306
- DS100 code: EDH
- Category: 4
- Fare zone: VRR: 388
- Website: www.bahnhof.de

History
- Opened: 9 July 1855

Services
Preceding station	DB Regio NRW	Following station
Dortmund Hbf Terminus	RE 57	Fröndenberg towards Winterberg (Westf) or Brilon Stadt
Dortmund Signal-Iduna-Park towards Dortmund Hbf	RB 53	Dortmund-Aplerbeck Süd towards Iserlohn
Preceding station		Following station
Dortmund Signal-Iduna-Park towards Dortmund Hbf	RB 59	Dortmund-Aplerbeck towards Soest
Location
- Location within North Rhine-Westphalia

Dortmund-Hörde station is a passenger station in the Dortmund district of Horde in the German state of North Rhine-Westphalia. It is classified by Deutsche Bahn as a category 4 station.

It is owned by Deutsche Bahn and is located on the Dortmund–Soest railway. The station had an important function as a freight yard, especially for traffic to and from coal mines and steel works. The old station was destroyed during the Second World War and replaced by a purpose-built station in 1955. The station was rebuilt between 2010 and 2013.

== General ==
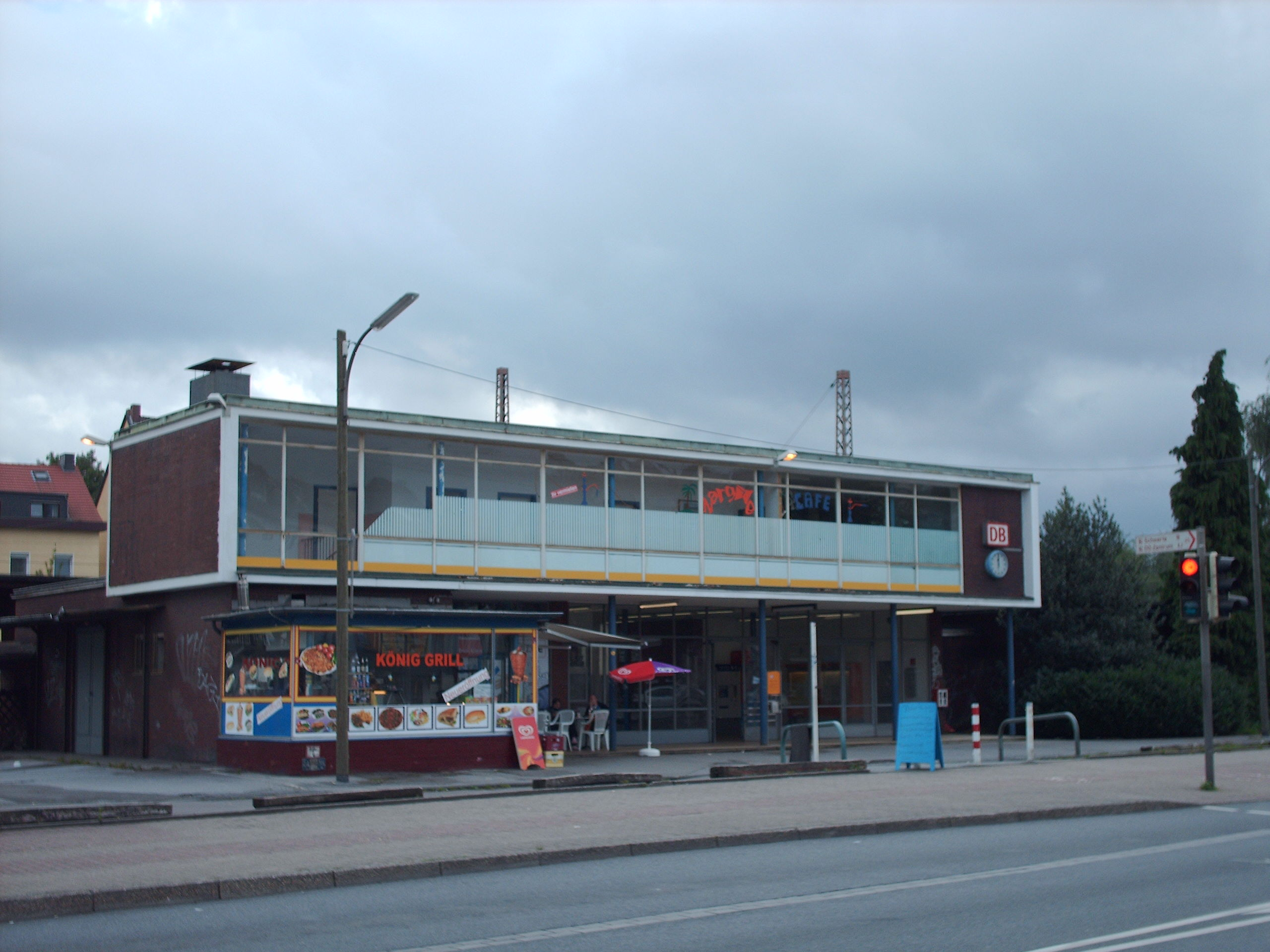
The postwar station in 2007

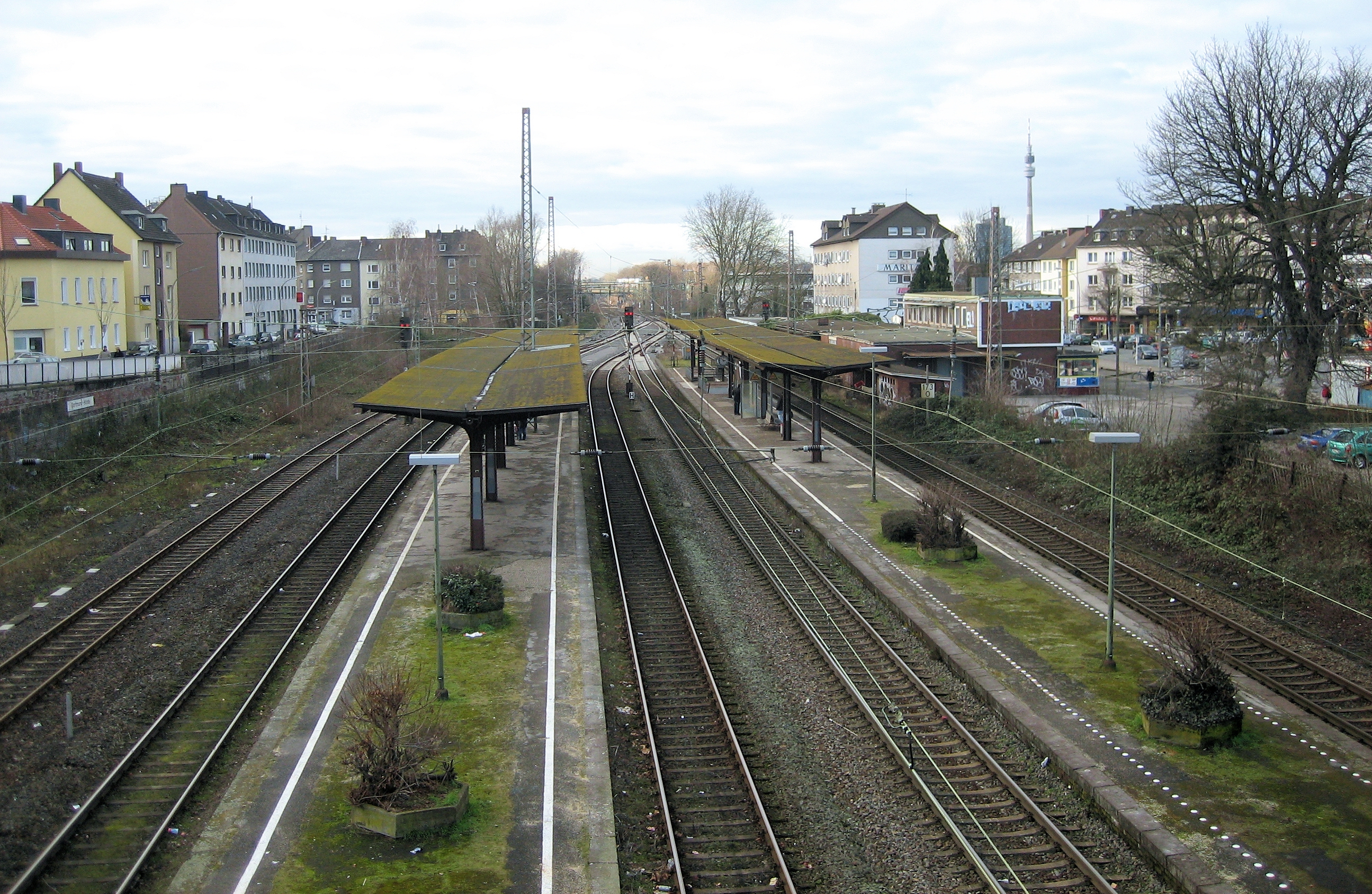
Hörde station, platform view

The two island platforms of the station are covered and are accessed by a pedestrian tunnel. Tracks 1 and 2 are on the line to Unna and Soest, while tracks 3 and 4 on the line to Schwerte and Iserlohn. The station was rebuilt between 2010 and 2013 and now provides access for the disabled.

== History ==
The modernisation of the station was planned for years. This was reinvigorated in 2006 when an architectural firm presented plans for a spectacular renovation of the station, but the proposal failed. It was hoped that the development of the Phoenix-See (lake) near the station at that time would provide a new incentives for renovation, due to the expected increase in tourism and train traffic at the station.

The ground-breaking ceremony for the renovation of Horde station was held on 14 December 2009. The works included the raising of platforms, construction of three lifts, the installation of a passenger information system for mobility-impaired passengers and the renewal of the access tunnel. The old station building was demolished. In its place a developer has built a new two-floor building with a row of shops and a level for parking. The demolition of the dilapidated building built in the 1950s began on 29 March 2011. The old station was heritage-listed in the list of monuments of Dortmund. However, this did not prevent the demolition of the old station building and the establishment of a substantially different building including the complete redevelopment of the entire station forecourt.

Extensive building works were completed on the two platforms. The island platforms on tracks 1 and 2 and on tracks 3 and 4 have been rebuilt with the standard height of 76 cm and returned to service. The station building with its numerous commercial uses was completed in 2012. The first two lifts to the tracks were delivered late, and the third was completed at the end of 2013.

== Services ==
=== Regional services ===
Trains run hourly, except for the RB 59 (Hellweg-Bahn) service, which runs every 30 minutes on weekdays. There are additional services on weekdays during the peak hour.

Line	Line name	Route	Operator
RE 57	Dortmund-Sauerland-Express	Dortmund – Do.-Hörde - Arnsberg (Westf) – Meschede – Bestwig – Winterberg (Westf) and another section continuing to Brilon Stadt	DB Regio NRW
RB 53	Ardey-Bahn	Dortmund – Do.-Hörde - Schwerte (Ruhr) – Iserlohn	DB Regio NRW
RB 59	Hellweg-Bahn	Dortmund – Do.-Hörde - Unna – Werl – Soest	Eurobahn

=== Stadtbahn Dortmund ===
Outside the station, there is a connection to an underground line (U 41) of the Dortmund Stadtbahn, operated by the Dortmund municipal transport operator, DSW21.

Line	Route
U 41	Hörde Clarenberg – Hörde Bahnhof - Hauptbahnhof – Brambauer Verkehrshof

The Deutsche Bahn trains towards Dortmund Hauptbahnhof are rather less used by many local residents due to the direct competition from the Stadtbahn, even though the journey time is shorter. This is due to the better access for the elderly and disabled people and better access to the City at Kampstraße station.

=== Buses ===
The station is served by bus routes 427, 430, 432, 433, 434, 435, 436, 439, 440, 441, 442, 445 and 456 as well as night bus routes NE 5, 6, 25 and 40. All lines are operated by DSW21.
