= Dortmund-Aplerbeck Süd station =

Railway station in Germany

Dortmund Aplerbeck Süd
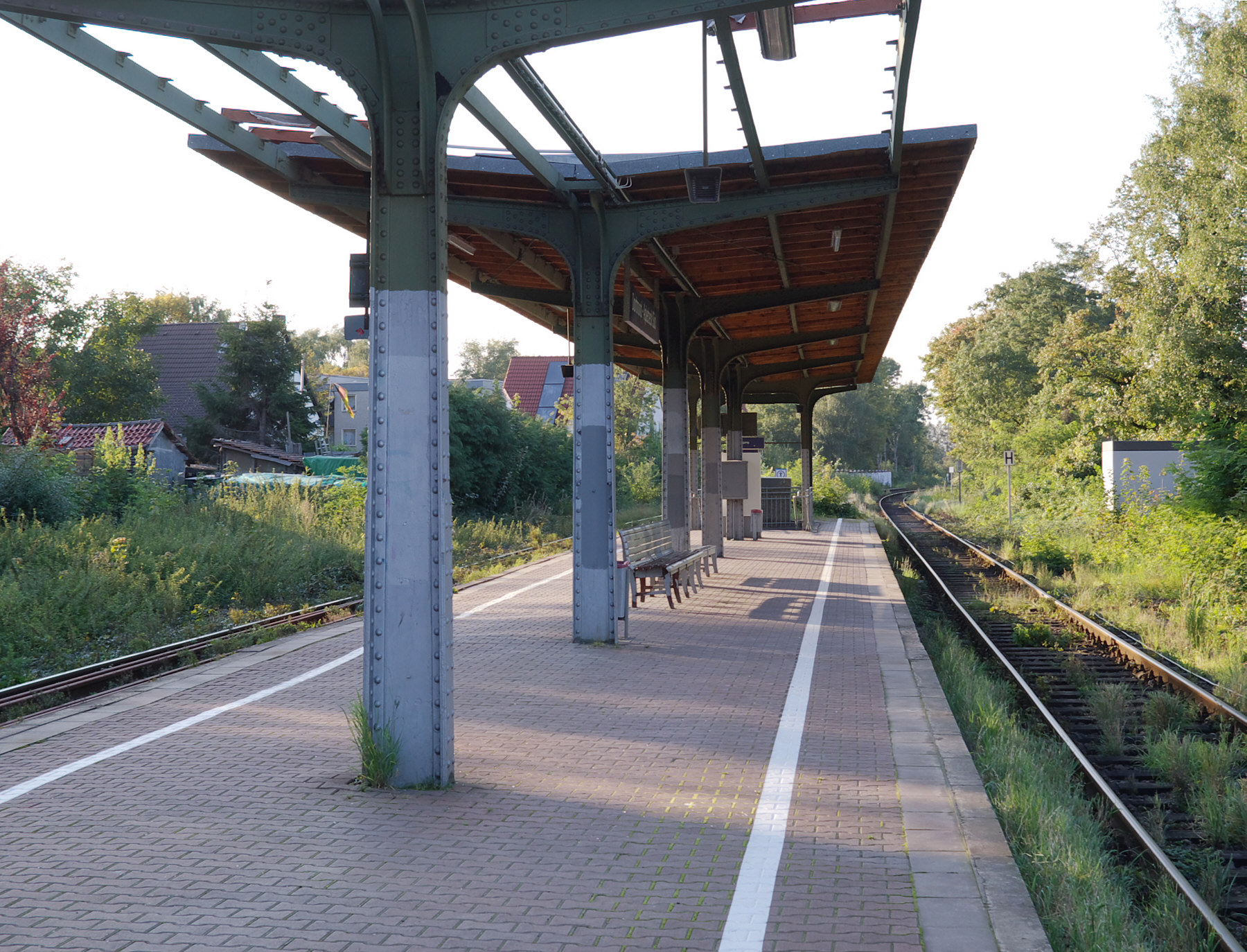
- 2007

General information
- Location: Mondstraße 33; 44287 Dortmund; NRW, Germany
- Coordinates: 51°29′03″N 7°33′01″E
- Owner: DB Netz
- Operator: DB Station&Service
- Line: Ardey Railway
- Platforms: 1 island platform
- Tracks: 2
- Train operators: DB Regio NRW

Construction
- Accessible: Yes

Other information
- Station code: 1299
- DS100 code: EDAU
- IBNR: 8001524
- Category: 6
- Fare zone: VRR: 386
- Website: www.bahnhof.de

Services
Preceding station	DB Regio NRW	Following station
Dortmund-Hörde towards Dortmund Hbf	RB 53	Schwerte (Ruhr) towards Iserlohn
Location
- Location within North Rhine-Westphalia

Dortmund-Aplerbeck Süd station is a railway station in the southern part of the Aplerbeck district in the town of Dortmund, located in North Rhine-Westphalia, Germany.

== Rail services ==
Line	Name	Route
RB 53	Ardey-Bahn	Dortmund Hauptbahnhof – Dortmund-Aplerbeck Süd – Schwerte (Ruhr) – Iserlohn
