= Letmathe–Fröndenberg railway =

German railway line

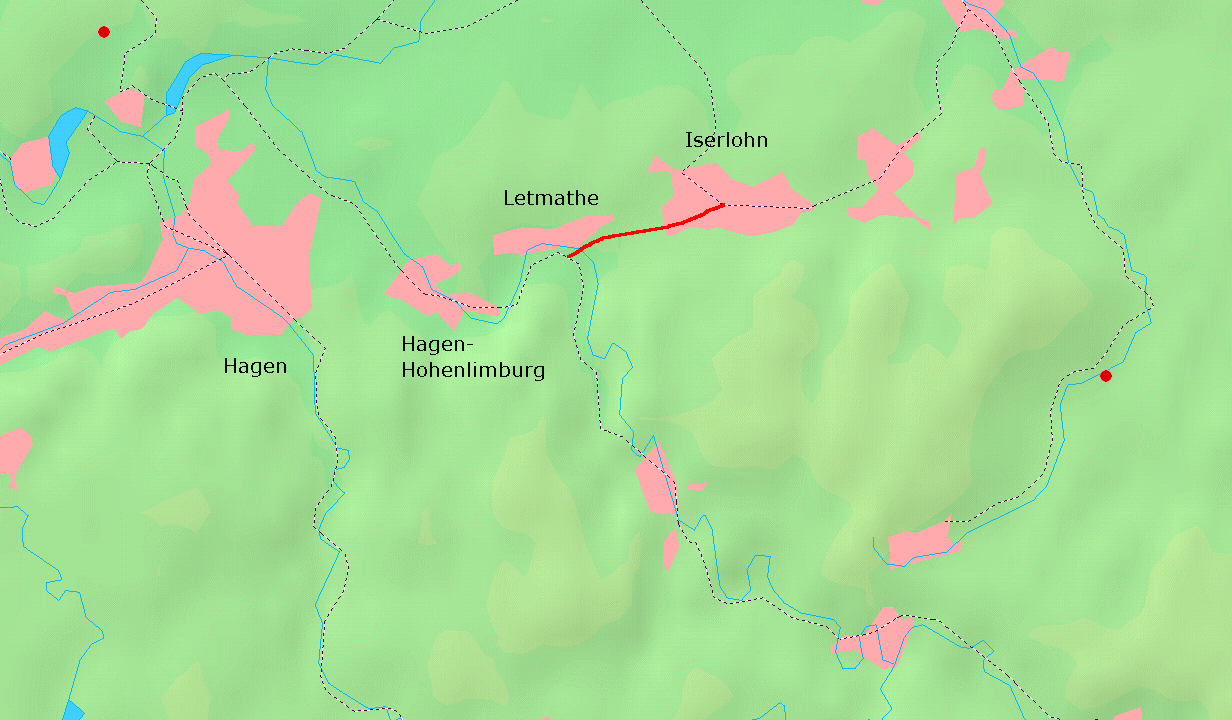
- Western section

Overview
- Line number: 2850
- Locale: North Rhine-Westphalia, Germany

Service
- Route number: 437 (Menden–Fröndenberg); 440 (Letmathe–Iserlohn)

Technical
- Line length: 25 km (16 mi)
- Number of tracks: 2: Menden–Fröndenberg-Ruhrbrücke
- Track gauge: 1,435 mm (4 ft 8 1/2 in) standard gauge
- Electrification: 15 kV/16.7 Hz AC overhead catenary (Letmathe–Iserlohn)
- Operating speed: Iserlohn-Letmathe–Iserlohn: 100 km/h (62.1 mph) (maximum); Menden–Fröndenberg: 80 km/h (49.7 mph) (maximum)

The Letmathe–Fröndenberg railway is a two-track, partially electrified and partially disused branch line in the German state of North Rhine-Westphalia. For over 100 years it ran from Letmathe via Iserlohn, Hemer and Menden to Fröndenberg. The section between Hemer and Iserlohn and the branch line from Hemer to Sundwig have been closed and dismantled.

== History ==
The construction of its first inter-regional line by the Bergisch-Märkische Railway Company (Bergisch-Märkische Eisenbahn-Gesellschaft, BME) bypassed various nearby towns such as Iserlohn. In the second half of the 19th Century the BME began to provide connections from its main line, the Elberfeld–Dortmund railway, to isolated places in the western Sauerland.

=== Iserlohn-Letmathe–Iserlohn ===
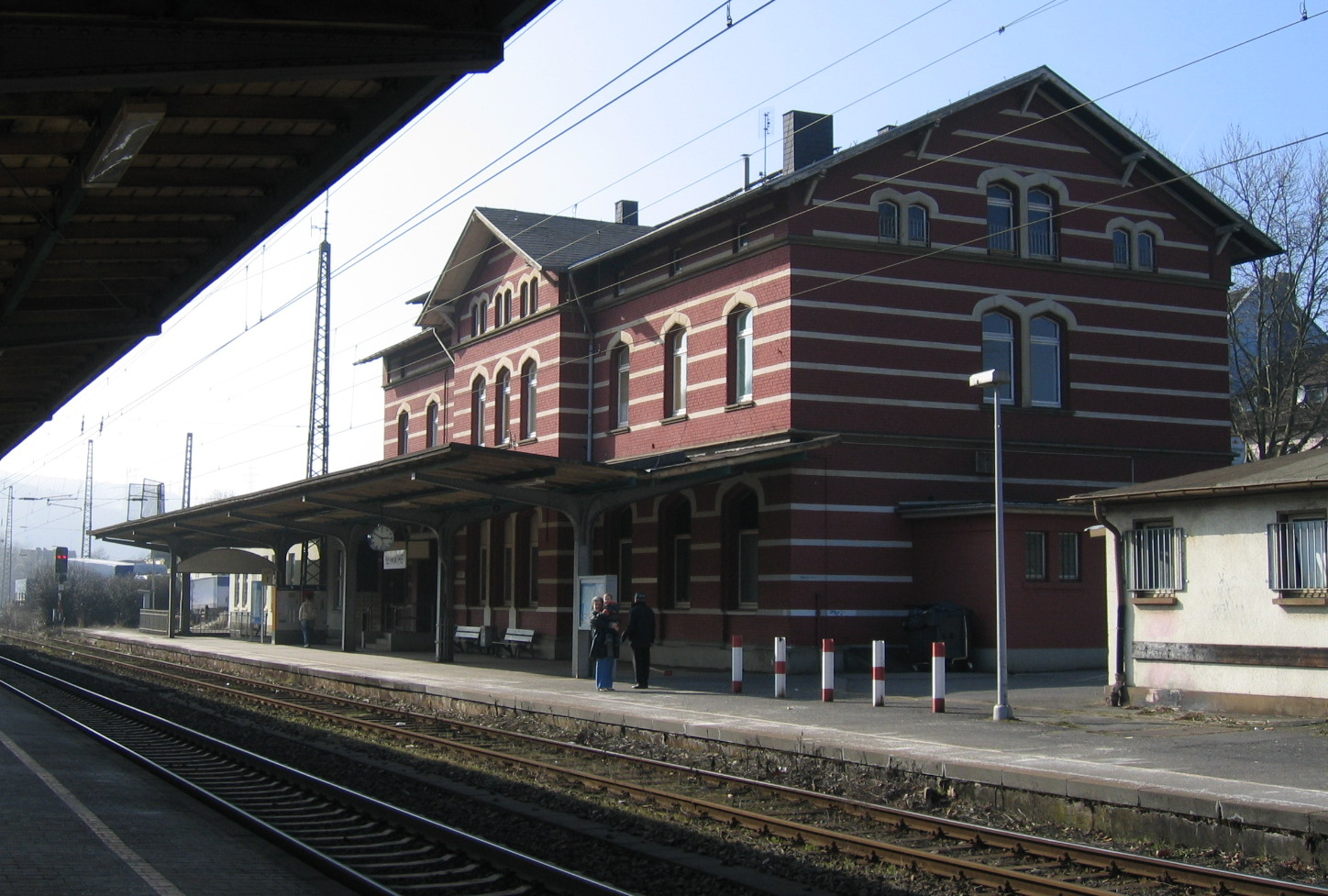
Iserlohn-Letmathe station

First, the BME opened a branch line to Iserlohn station on 31 March 1864. This is also locally called the Iserlohner Bahn (Iserlohn Railway).

This branch started from Iserlohn-Letmathe station in the Genna district, which five years earlier had been opened by the BME on the Ruhr–Sieg railway from Hagen to Siegen.

The line was upgraded in the following years; during this work Dechen Cave was discovered in 1868. Letmathe-Dechenhöhle station was built close to the show cave.

=== Fröndenberg–Menden ===
Eight years later the BME built another branch line, this time starting from Fröndenberg station via its Upper Ruhr Valley Railway to Menden (Sauerland) station. It was completed on 7 August 1872.

This line was extended initially by Rödinghausen by the then königlichen Eisenbahndirection Elberfeld (Royal railway division of Elberfeld) of the Prussian state railways (PSE) in 1878. This later developed into the Hönne Valley Railway to Neuenrade.

=== Menden–Hemer ===
Plans for the extension of the line from Menden to Hemer go back to the 1860s.

On 17 April 1873 the BME had signed a contract to build a line and secured funding from the Prussian ministry of trade. In 1881, the BME received a concession to build the line, but it was completed on 1 September 1882 shortly after the takeover of the BME by the PSE.

=== Hemer–Iserlohn ===
On 15 June 1885, the last section was completed between Hemer and Iserlohn. Thus, it was possible to run from Letmathe via Iserlohn, Hemer and Menden to Fröndenberg.

A second railway was opened to Iserlohn as the Ardey Railway from Schwerte (Ruhr) 25 years later.

== Closures ==
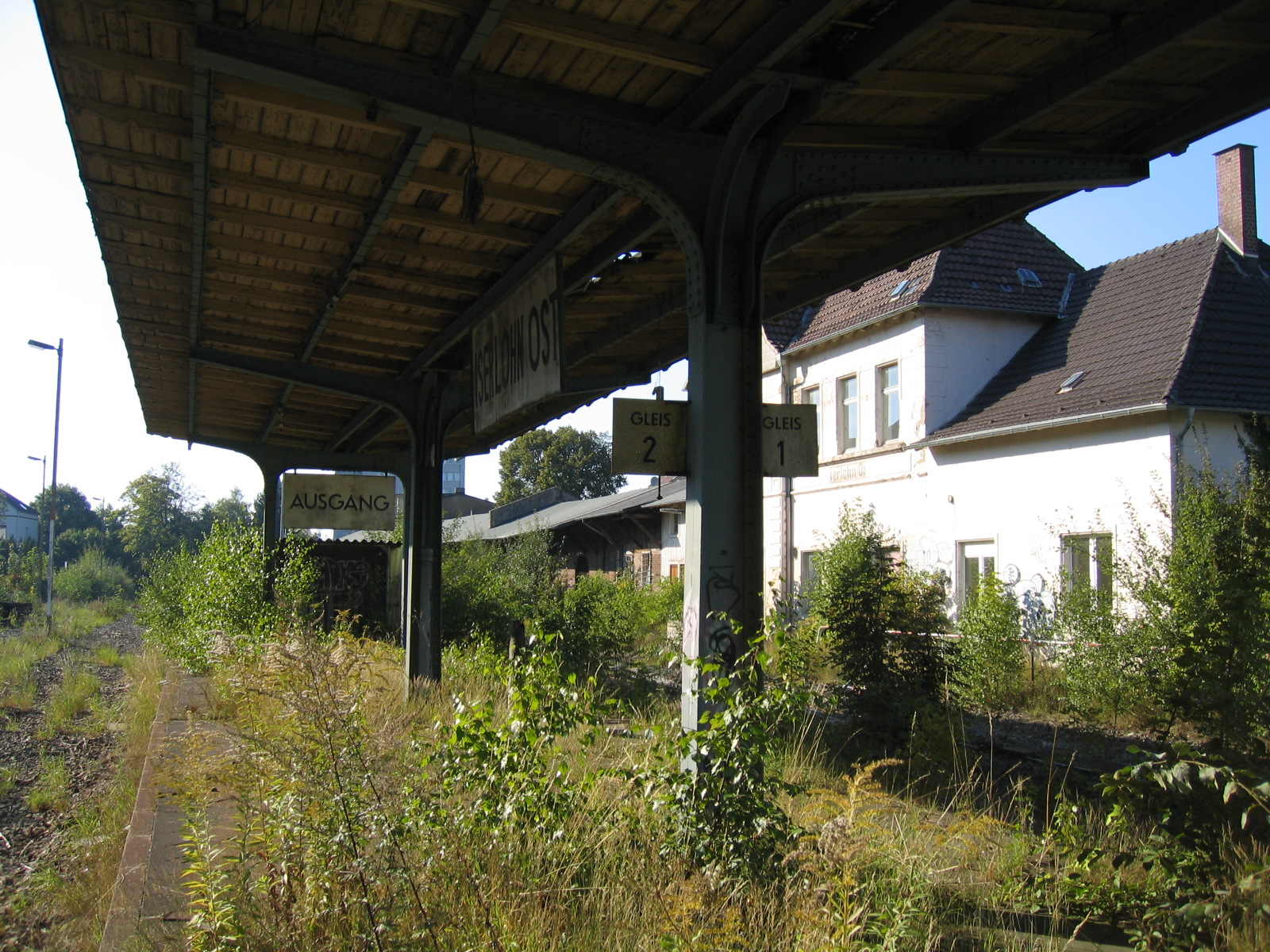
Former Iserlohn Ost station

=== Hemer–Iserlohn ===
More than a hundred years after the opening of the line for passengers on the middle section between Iserlohn and Menden, services were closed on the same section on 28 May 1989 and the line between Iserlohn Ost and Hemer was completely shut down and dismantled during the next three years. The reason for the closure was a ramshackle bridge over state road L680, which spanned the line. In the last years before the closure, it had to be given additional support with steel beams. Six years later, the remaining section in the city center of Iserlohn, which was nearly one and a half km-long, was closed on 27 May 1995.

=== Menden–Hemer ===
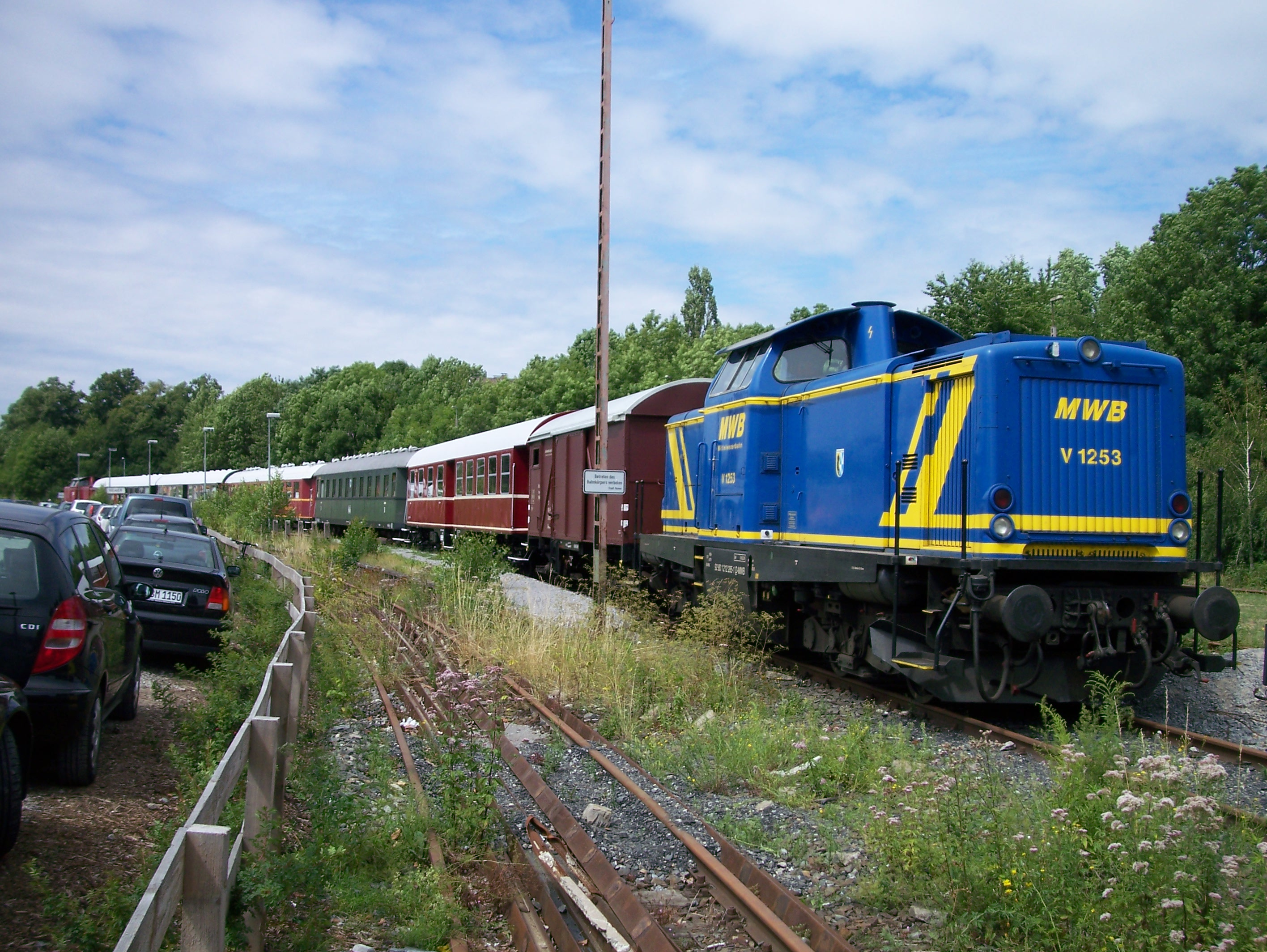
Special train for the state garden show on 31 July 2010 in Hemer

Freight traffic on the Menden–Hemer section was closed up to 31 March 2006 and it was offered publicly for re-use six months later. On 14 April 2007, it was converted into a siding to Menden station. From 11 June 2007 to 31 May 2008, this siding was then rented by the town of Hemer to carry uprooted trees after hurricane Kyrill.

During the early planning for Landesgartenschau Hemer 2010 (State Garden Show Hemer 2010) consideration was given to re-opening the line. In November 2007, the Hemer transport committee decided that it no longer wish to pursue this idea because in the opinion of experts no rail services would result. Instead, it considered converting the line into a cycle path.

But in order to restore the track, the Rhein-Sieg-Eisenbahn GmbH (RSE), based in Bonn, filed a lawsuit in the autumn of 2008 against the Federal Railway Authority (Eisenbahn-Bundesamt) in the Administrative Court in Arnsberg to prevent the imminent dismantling of the tracks and filed an application for the authority to operate the line as a railway infrastructure company. The RSE would withdraw the lawsuit if the town of Hemer negotiated a cooperative agreement for the reactivation and operation of the line.

The town of Hemer finally acquired the track on 23 December 2008 in order to take advantage of railway land to the south of Hemer station that was no longer required so that it could be used for its urban renewal project.

After the operation of the line during the State Garden Show 2010, it was closed again on 1 November 2010 at the request of the RSE.

In 2012, there was great controversy over the policy to rebuild the line between Hemer and Menden as a cycle path. On 7 September 2012, it was announced that the CDU and the Green-Alternative List of the town of Menden would not agree to the immediate dismantling of the railway between Menden and Hemer. The local CDU leader Martin Wächter would only make a decision on a possible dismantling of the railway when the results of a potential study by Zweckverbands Schienenpersonenverkehr Ruhr-Lippe (Association for Passenger Rail Transport of Ruhr-Lippe, ZRL) presented the opportunities for realising a Hemer–Menden–Dortmund service.

== Current situation ==
Currently, only the two sections at both ends of the rail line, which were the first sections opened, are still in operation.

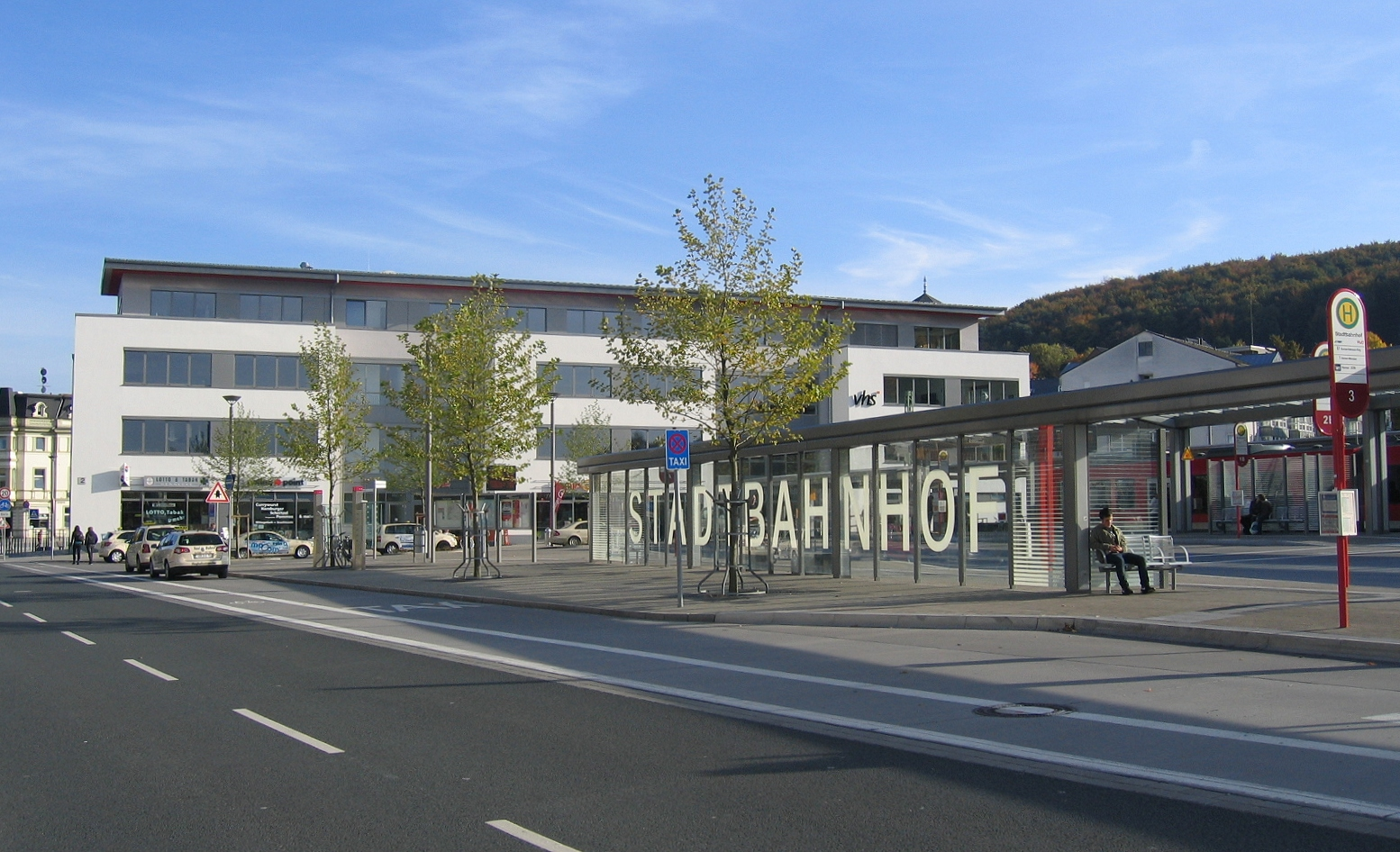
Iserlohn town station

=== Iserlohn-Letmathe–Iserlohn ===
The Iserlohn Railway, the oldest section of the line, is still in operation and runs, since the incorporation of the former municipality of Letmathe into Iserlohn, completely within the limits of Iserlohn. This stretch has remained as a single-track branch line, in contrast to the Ardey Railway, but it has been electrified since 30 May 1965. Since the dismantling of the line to Hemer, Iserlohn station has become a curiosity, as it is the terminus of two different lines. Currently it is not possible to change from one line to the other, but there are plans to allow connections by installing sets of points to allow changes.

Until the end of 2007, the line has been served by Regionalbahn service RB 56 (Der Iserlohner) from Hagen to Iserlohn, operated by DB Regio NRW with a class 143 locomotive hauling a single double-deck carriage. After the timetable change on 9 December 2007, Abellio Rail NRW operated passenger services over the Ruhr-Sieg Network as a result of winning a contract in the summer of 2005 for the twelve years up to 2019. As a result of the insolvency of Abellio in July 2021, DB Regio was commissioned with the traffic on the route from 1 February 2022 to December 2023 by direct award.

Between Iserlohn-Letmathe and Iserlohn, VIAS has operated Regional-Express service RE 16 (the Ruhr-Lenne-Express) and Regionalbahn service RB 91 (the Ruhr-Sieg-Bahn) hourly since December 2023. The RB 91 from Hagen is split at Iserlohn-Letmathe station. The section of the trains that does not go to Iserlohn continues to Siegen.

These services are operated with FLIRT 2 electric multiple units in coupled sets. The operation of coupled sets allowed the number of direct connections to Hagen to be doubled and additional direct connections were created to the central Ruhr area.

=== Fröndenberg–Menden ===
The line from Fröndenberg to Menden was not electrified. It is now operated as a two-track branch line as part of the Hönne Valley Railway to Neuenrade.

Between Fröndenberg and Menden, Regionalbahn service RB 54 (the Hönnetal-Bahn) runs every hour from Unna to Neuenrade (on weekends it only runs every two hours between Menden and Neuenrade). DB Regio NRW was awarded the contract for the operations from 2004 to 2016 using two part Alstom Coradia LINT 41 (DB Class 648) sets.
