= Dechen Cave =

Cave in Iserlohn, Germany

Coordinates: 51°21′56″N 7°38′41″E

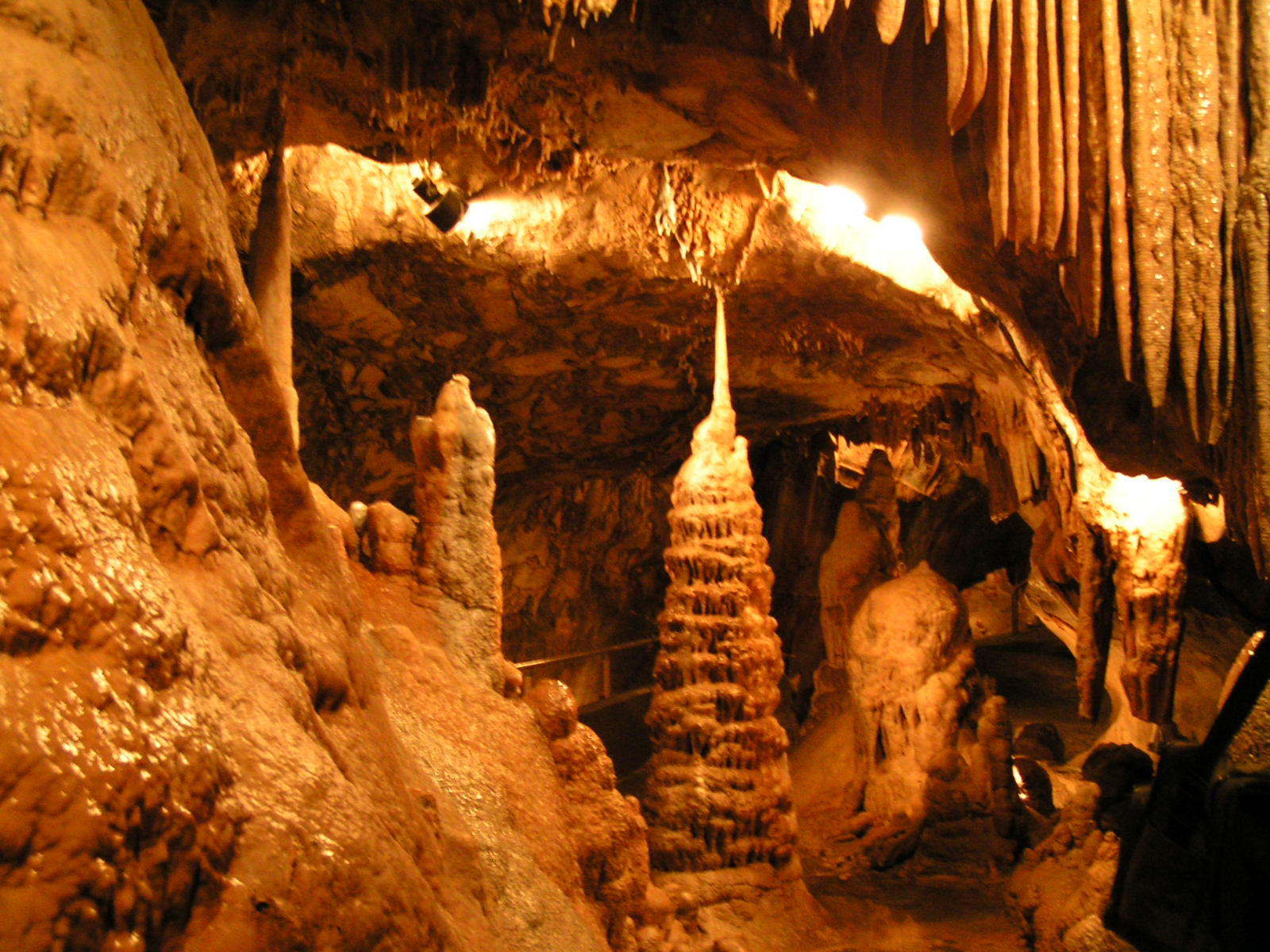
- The Emperor Chamber in the Dechen Cave
- Interactive map of Dechen Cave
- Location: Sauerland, Germany
- Length: 870 metres
- Elevation: 250 metres
- Discovery: 1868
- Geology: Rhenish Massif
- Show cave opened: 1868
- Show cave length: 360 metres
- Lighting: electric
- Website: http://www.dechenhoehle.de

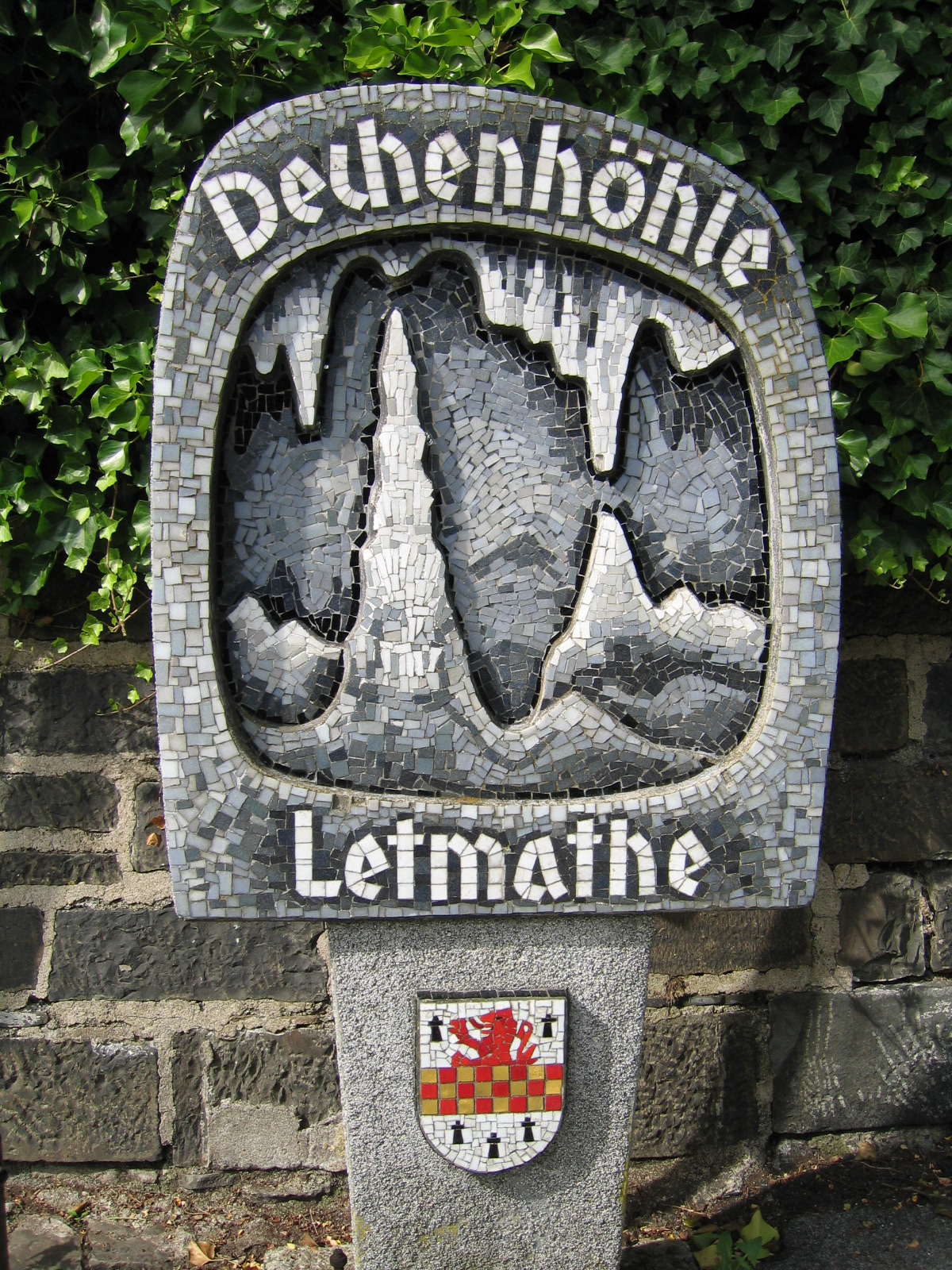
Mosaic stone in front of the Dechen Cave at Iserlohn-Letmathe

The Dechen Cave (German: Dechenhöhle) in Iserlohn, Germany, is one of the most visited show caves in Germany. It is located in the northern part of the Sauerland at Iserlohn (Grüne district). 360 metres of the 870-metre long cave have been laid out for visitors, beginning at the spot where, in 1868, the cave was discovered by two railway workers. The workers dropped a hammer into a rock crevice which turned out to be the entrance to a dripstone cave when they were searching for the lost tool.

The cave is named after Oberberghauptmann Heinrich von Dechen (1800–1889), in recognition of his contribution to researching the geology of the Rhineland and Westphalia.

== Owner ==
Due to its discovery by rail workers, the cave was first owned by the local railway company – which built the Letmathe–Fröndenberg railway – and later on by the National railway company, the last one was the Deutsche Bundesbahn. In 1983 the cave was taken over by the Mark Sauerland Touristik GmbH.

== Railway halt ==
Because the cave was found and owned by the railway, a halt was built next to the visitors' entrance. Today, the Ruhr-Lenne-Express (RE16) and Ruhr-Sieg-Bahn (RB91) services stop at the halt. Both the RE16 and the RB91 services are operated by Abellio Rail NRW. It is the only cave in Germany with its own halt.

== See also ==
- List of show caves in Germany
