= Dortmund Hauptbahnhof =

Railway station in Dortmund, Germany

Dortmund Hbf
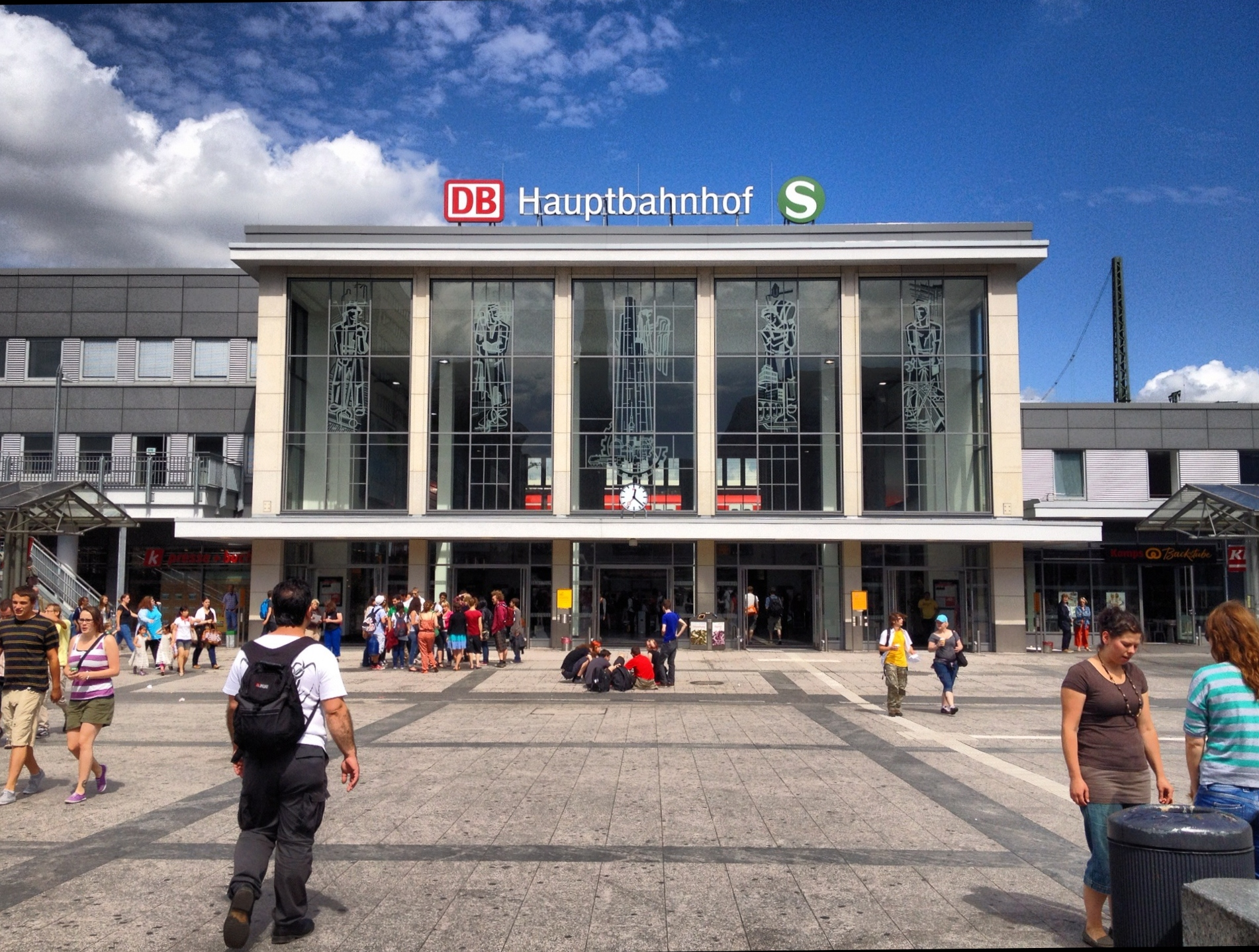

General information
- Location: Königswall 15, Dortmund, NRW; Germany
- Coordinates: 51°31′3″N 7°27′32″E
- Owner: Deutsche Bahn
- Operator: DB Station&Service
- Lines: Duisburg–Dortmund; Dortmund–Hamm; Elberfeld–Dortmund; Dortmund–Oberhausen/Duisburg; Dortmund–Soest; Dortmund–Gronau; Dortmund–Iserlohn; Rhine-Ruhr S-Bahn S1S2S5
- Platforms: 16
- Train operators: DB Fernverkehr; DB Regio NRW; National Express eurobahn NordWestBahn; Flixtrain; Thalys

Construction
- Accessible: Yes

Other information
- Station code: 1289
- DS100 code: EDO
- IBNR: 8000080
- Category: 1 IATA: DTZ
- Fare zone: VRR: 370
- Website: www.bahnhof.de

History
- Opened: 1847

Key dates
- 1910: rebuilt
- 1944: destroyed
- 1952: rebuilt

Passengers
- 150,000 daily
Services
Preceding station	Eurostar	Following station
Essen Hbf towards Paris-Nord	Eurostar	Terminus
Preceding station	DB Fernverkehr	Following station
Bochum Hbf towards Köln Hbf	ICE 10	Hamm (Westf) Hbf towards Berlin Ostbahnhof
Bochum Hbf towards Aachen Hbf	ICE 14	Hamm (Westf) Hbf towards Berlin Ostbahnhof
Witten Hbf towards Frankfurt (Main) Hbf	IC 34	Hamm (Westf) Hbf towards Münster Hbf
Bochum Hbf towards München Hbf	ICE 41	Terminus
Bochum Hbf towards München Hbf	ICE 42	Münster Hbf towards Hamburg Hbf
Bochum Hbf towards Basel SBB	ICE 43	Münster Hbf towards Hamburg-Altona
Bochum Hbf towards Köln Hbf	IC 51	Hamm towards Gera Hbf
Hagen Hbf towards Stuttgart Hbf	IC 55	Hamm towards Dresden Hbf
Bochum Hbf towards Oberstdorf	IC 55 Allgäu	Terminus
Bochum Hbf towards Innsbruck Hbf	ICE 62 Bodensee	Terminus
Bochum Hbf towards Wien Hbf	ICE 91 train route splits here and rejoins in Köln Hbf	Terminus
Hagen Hbf towards Wien Hbf	ICE 91 train route splits here and rejoins in Köln Hbf	Terminus
Preceding station		Following station
Essen Hbf towards Aachen Hbf	FLX 30	Bielefeld Hbf towards Leipzig Hbf
Preceding station	National Express Germany	Following station
Bochum Hbf towards Aachen Hbf	RE 1 (NRW-Express)	Dortmund-Scharnhorst towards Hamm (Westf) Hbf
Witten Hbf towards Aachen Hbf	RE 4 (Wupper-Express)	Terminus
Bochum Hbf towards Cologne/Bonn Airport	RE 6 (Rhein-Weser-Express)	Kamen towards Minden
Bochum Hbf towards Düsseldorf Hbf	RE 11 (Rhein-Hellweg-Express)	Kamen-Methler towards Kassel-Wilhelmshöhe
Preceding station		Following station
Dortmund-Mengede towards Düsseldorf Hbf	RE 3	Dortmund-Scharnhorst towards Hamm (Westf) Hbf
Dortmund-Kirchderne towards Münster Hbf	RB 50	Terminus
Terminus	RB 59	Dortmund Signal-Iduna-Park towards Soest
Preceding station	DB Regio NRW	Following station
Dortmund-Mengede towards Duisburg Hbf	RB 32	Terminus
Terminus	RE 34	Witten Hbf towards Siegen Hbf
Terminus	RE 57	Dortmund-Hörde towards Brilon Stadt
Dortmund-Huckarde Nord towards Dorsten	RB 43	Terminus
Dortmund-Kirchderne towards Enschede	RB 51	Terminus
Terminus	RB 52	Dortmund Signal-Iduna-Park towards Lüdenscheid
Terminus	RB 53	Dortmund Signal-Iduna-Park towards Iserlohn
Preceding station	Rhine-Ruhr S-Bahn	Following station
DO-Dorstfeld towards Solingen Hbf	S1	Terminus
DO-Dorstfeld towards Essen Hbf or Recklinghausen Hbf	S2	Terminus
Terminus	S5	DO-Barop towards Hagen Hbf
Preceding station	Rhine-Ruhr Stadtbahn	Following station
Leopoldstraße towards Brambauer Verkehrshof	U41	Kampstraße towards Clarenberg
Terminus	U45	Kampstraße towards Westfalenhallen
Leopoldstraße towards Dortmund-Westerfilde	U47	Kampstraße towards Aplerbeck
Leopoldstraße towards Hafen	U49	Kampstraße towards Hacheney
Location

Dortmund Hauptbahnhof is the main railway station in Dortmund, North Rhine-Westphalia, Germany. The station's origins lie in a joint station of the Köln-Mindener Eisenbahn and Bergisch-Märkische Eisenbahn which was built north of the city centre in 1847. That station was replaced by a new station, erected in 1910 at the current site. It featured raised embankments to allow a better flow of traffic. At the time of its opening, it was one of the largest stations in Germany. It was, however, destroyed in an Allied air raid on 6 October 1944.

The main station hall was rebuilt in the year 1952 in a contemporary style. Its stained glass windows feature then-common professions of Dortmund.

The station has 190,000 passengers passing through each day.

== History ==
The original Dortmund station was built north of the city centre by the Cologne-Minden Railway Company (Cöln-Mindener Eisenbahn-Gesellschaft, CME) as part of its trunk line and opened on 15 May 1847. Two years later the Bergisch-Märkische Railway Company (Bergisch-Märkische Eisenbahn-Gesellschaft, BME) opened its station as a purely terminating station south of the existing station at the end of its main line to Elberfeld (now Wuppertal), its line to Soest (from 1855) and its Ruhr route to Duisburg and Oberhausen (from 1860). The original station building on an island, with access from the castle gate, was replaced in 1910 by a spacious new building at the current location. The tracks were raised to end the obstacle to road traffic through restricted level crossings. This second Dortmund station was inaugurated on 12 December 1910 and was one of the largest in the German Empire when it opened. The station then received the name "Dortmund Hbf" on 1 October 1912. It was destroyed during the Second World War.

The entrance building of Dortmund Hauptbahnhof was replaced in 1952 by a functionalist building. It is regarded as architecturally insignificant, but it has significant stained glass windows on the theme of the former industrial specialisations of Dortmund. Five large stained glass windows document the Dortmund economy. In the middle one the city is shown, flanked to the left and right by a steelworker, a blast furnace worker, a brewer and a bridge builder. During the reconstruction of the station they were removed and the put on exhibition at the Hattingen Henrichshütte (a former steel works, which is partly used as a museum of industry). They were replaced with exact copies.

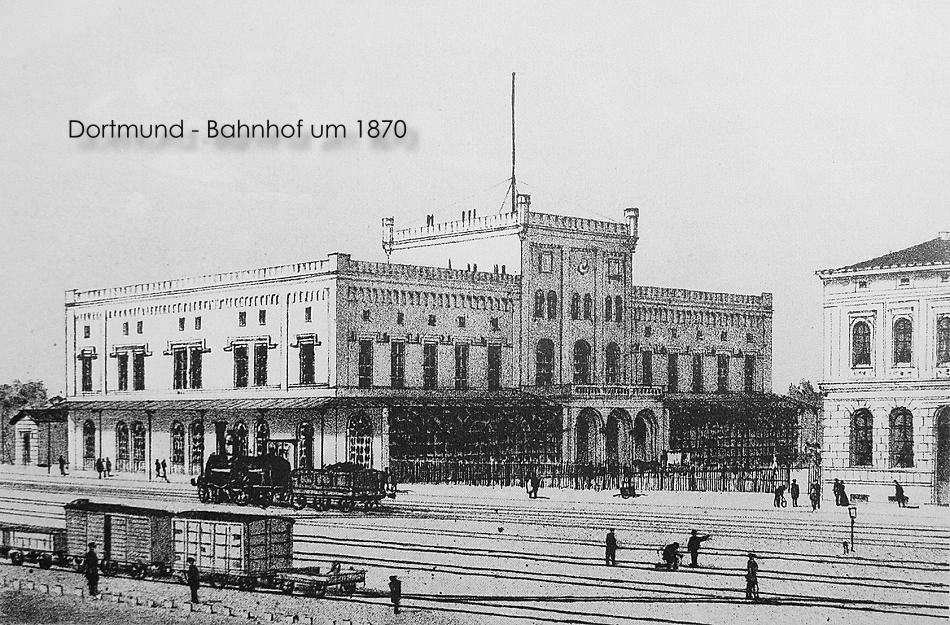
The original station in 1870

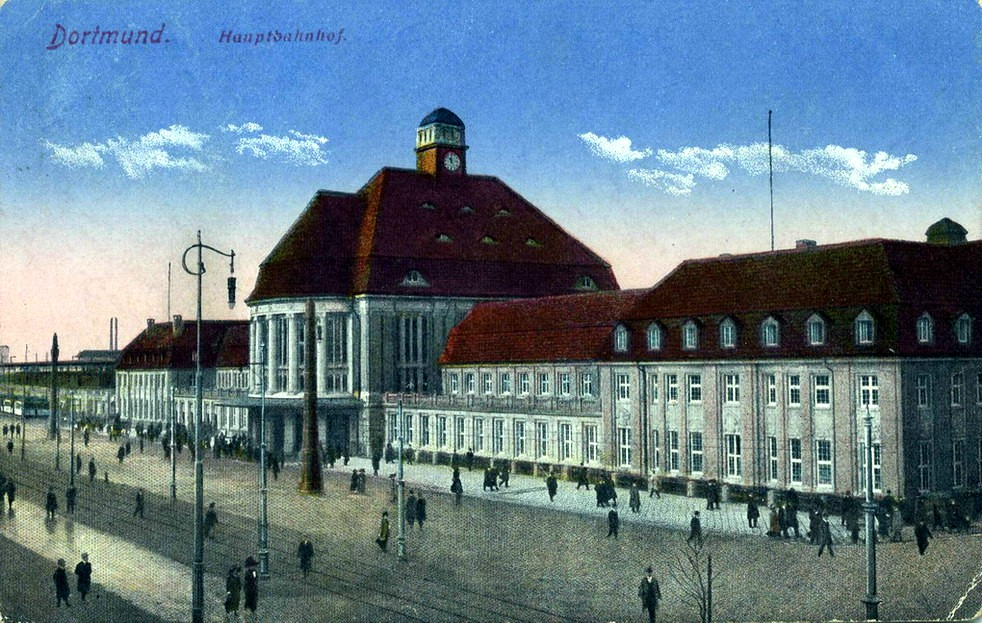
The new station of 1910

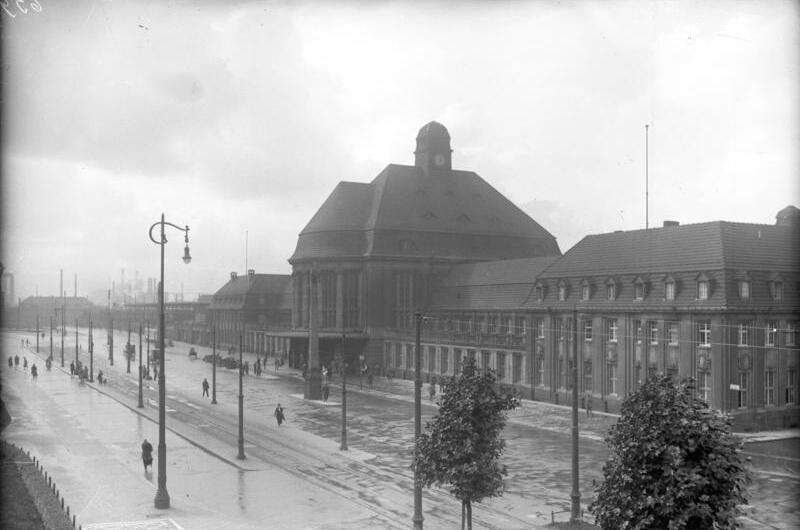
The station during the occupation of the Ruhr in September 1924

== Reconstruction and rehabilitation ==
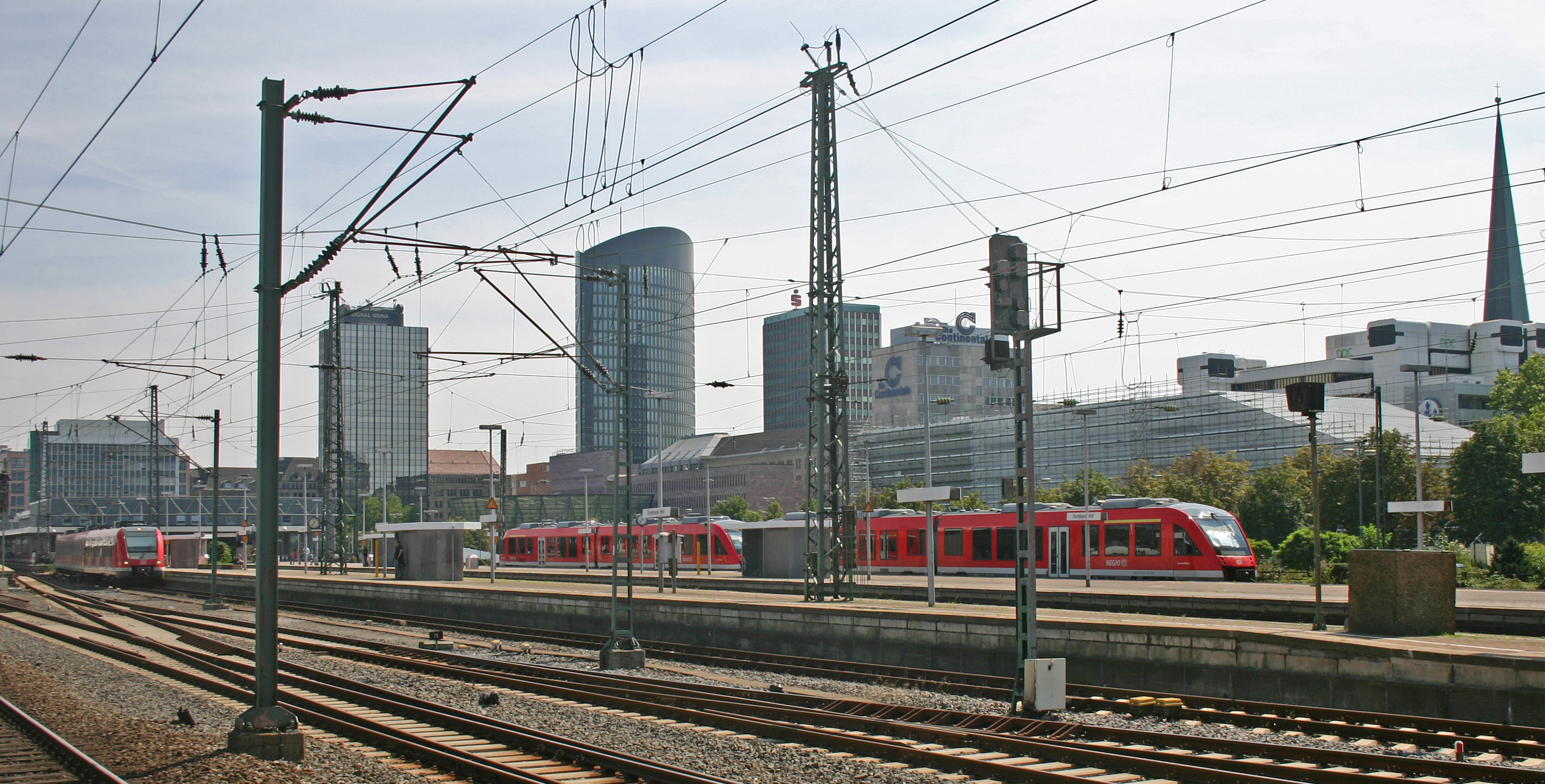
Dortmund Hauptbahnhof

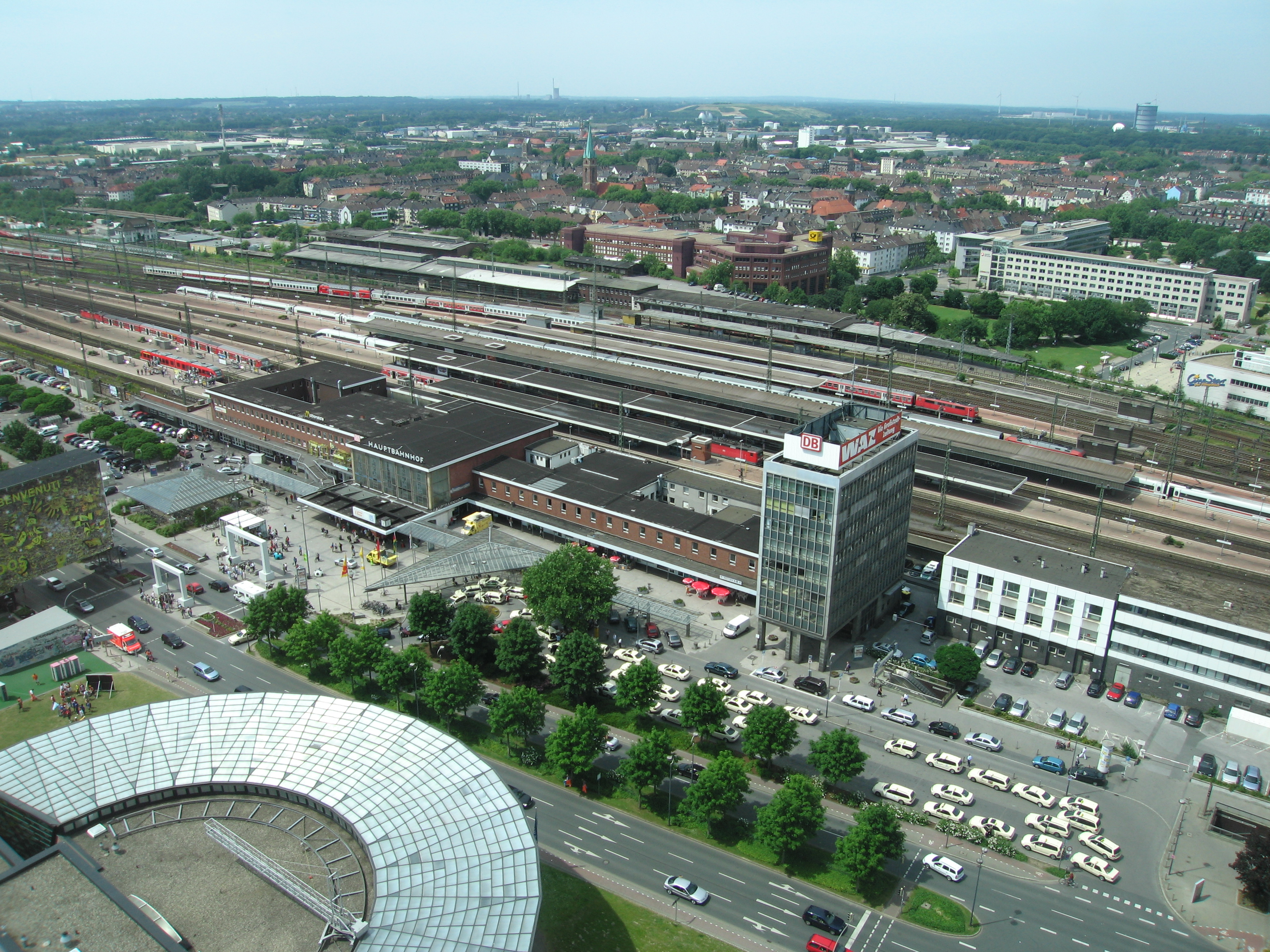
Dortmund Hauptbahnhof from the RWE Tower

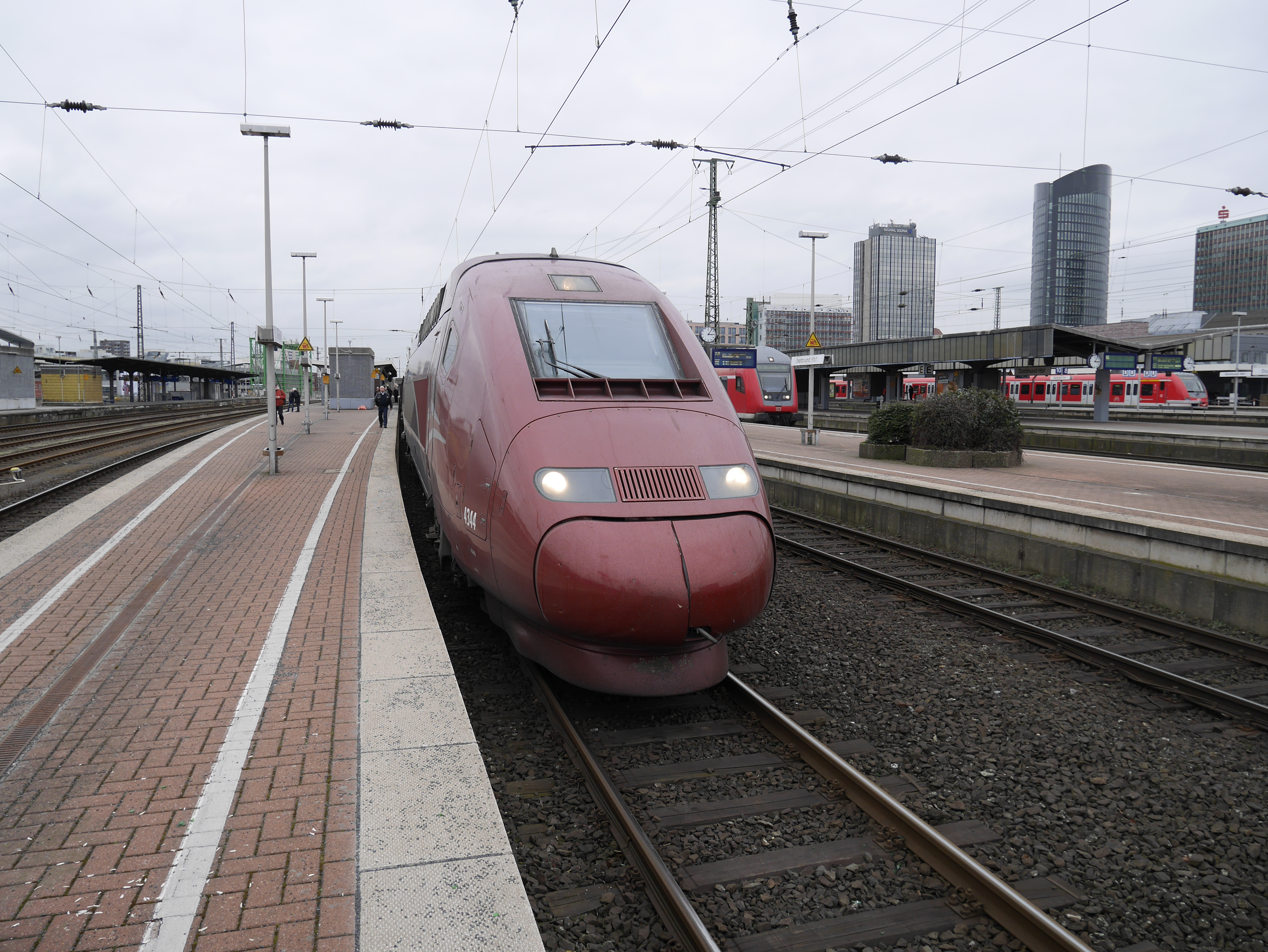
Thalys, Dortmund-Paris-North

The reconstruction of the Dortmund Hauptbahnhof has been under discussion since 1997. The original plan for a residential area in the form of an "oversized UFO" (80,000 square metres (860,000 sq ft) of usable space) was rejected. On 7 October 1998 a memorandum of understanding had been signed between Deutsche Bahn, the state of North Rhine-Westphalia and Westdeutsche Immobilien Bank. The Deutsche Mark (DM) 850 million project was to be completed by 2002.

After the plans for the so-called "Dortmund UFO" were dropped, a new investor was found in 2001 in the form of the Portuguese investment group Sonae Imobiliaria. The DM 1.2 billion project was to be completed by 2006 and new designs were commissioned from architectural firms in the first quarter of 2001. The new proposed development was called "3do" (3 Dortmund). €75 million of federal and €55 million of state funds were pledged. It was planned to have 36,000 square metres (390,000 sq ft) of retail and 26,500 square metres (285,000 sq ft) of entertainment space. On 3 February 2006, the Essen branch of the Federal Railway Authority (Eisenbahn-Bundesamt) approved the plans for "3do". On 28 February 2007, Deutsche Bahn announced that the investor was unwilling to commit to the project.

Through plans for the reconstruction of the station have twice failed, Dortmund Hauptbahnhof suffers significantly from neglect. Only the terminating platforms (tracks 2–5) and the platform of S-Bahn lines S1 and S2 (tracks 6 and 7) have a lift.

The reconstruction and rehabilitation of the Dortmund Hauptbahnhof began in summer 2009. In a first phase, the station building and related operational areas were gutted. During construction the ticket office and a restaurant of a fast-food chain were placed in containers outside the station. The federal police station and the Bahnhofsmission (a German charity focussed on railway stations) were also placed in containers on the north side. On 17 June 2011, the first phase was formally completed. Of the total cost of €23 million, the federal government contributed €13.3 million, the state €1.4 million and the Deutsche Bahn €8.3 million.

In a second phase, which was scheduled to be completed in2024, the station tunnels and the entrances to the platforms would be renewed. Dortmund was one of the few big-city stations in Germany where access to the platforms had not yet made accessible for the disabled. In the course of these alterations the eastern access to the tunnel linking the station's buildings and platforms will also be rebuilt. At the same time it is also intended that there will be improvements to facilitate the introduction of the Rhine-Ruhr Express (a planned upgrade to North Rhine-Westphalia's Regional-Express network).

== Services ==
In the 2026 timetable, the following services stop at the station:

=== Long distance ===
Dortmund Hauptbahnhof is served by Thalys, Flixtrain, Deutsche Bahn Intercity-Express and Intercity services.

Line	Route	Frequency	Operator
ICE 10	Cologne – Düsseldorf – Duisburg – Essen – Bochum – Dortmund – Hamm – Bielefeld – Hanover – Wolfsburg – Berlin – Berlin Ostbahnhof	Hourly	DB Fernverkehr
ICE 14	Aachen – Cologne – Düsseldorf – Essen – Bochum – Dortmund – Hamm – Bielefeld – Hanover – Berlin – Berlin Ostbahnhof	Four times a day	DB Fernverkehr
IC 34	(Münster – Hamm –) Dortmund – Witten – Hagen – Iserlohn-Letmathe – Finnentrop – Siegen – Frankfurt	(RE 34 together)	DB Fernverkehr
ICE 41	Dortmund – Essen – Duisburg – Düsseldorf – Köln Messe/Deutz – Frankfurt Airport – Frankfurt – Aschaffenburg – Würzburg – Nuremberg – Munich	Some services	DB Fernverkehr
ICE 41	Munich – Nuremberg – Würzburg – Fulda –Kassel-Wilhelmshöhe – Paderborn – Hamm – Dortmund – Essen – Duisburg – Düsseldorf (– Cologne / Köln Messe/Deutz – Wiesbaden – Frankfurt)	1 train pair	DB Fernverkehr
ICE 42	(Hamburg - Münster –) Dortmund – Essen – Duisburg – Düsseldorf – Cologne – Siegburg/Bonn – Frankfurt Airport – Mannheim – Stuttgart – Ulm – Augsburg – München-Pasing – Munich	Every 2 hours	DB Fernverkehr
ICE 43	Hamburg-Altona – Hamburg – Bremen – Osnabrück – Münster – Dortmund – Bochum – Essen – Duisburg – Düsseldorf – Cologne – Frankfurt Airport – Mannheim – Karlsruhe – Freiburg – Basel	Some services	DB Fernverkehr
ICE 47	Dortmund – Essen – Duisburg – Düsseldorf – Köln Messe/Deutz – (Cologne/Bonn Airport –) Frankfurt Airport – Mannheim – Stuttgart	Some services	DB Fernverkehr
ICE 49	Dortmund – Hagen – Wuppertal – Solingen – Cologne – Cologne/Bonn Airport – Siegburg/Bonn – Montabaur – Limburg Süd – Frankfurt Airport – Frankfurt	2 train pairs	DB Fernverkehr
IC 51	Gera – Jena – Weimar – Erfurt – Eisenach – Kassel – Dortmund – Essen – Duisburg – Düsseldorf (– Cologne)	2 train pairs	DB Fernverkehr
IC 55	Dresden – Leipzig – Halle – Magdeburg – Braunschweig – Hanover – Bielefeld – Hamm – Dortmund – Hagen – Wuppertal – Solingen – Cologne – Bonn – Koblenz – Mainz – Mannheim – Heidelberg – Stuttgart (– Tübingen)	Every 2 hours	DB Fernverkehr
IC 55	Dortmund – Essen – Duisburg – Düsseldorf – Cologne – Bonn – Koblenz – Mainz – Mannheim – Heidelberg – Stuttgart – Ulm – Memmingen – Kempten – Oberstdorf	1 train pair	DB Fernverkehr
ICE 62	Dortmund – Bochum – Essen – Duisburg – Düsseldorf – Köln Messe/Deutz – Frankfurt Airport – Mannheim – Heidelberg – Stuttgart – Ulm – Friedrichshafen Stadt – Lindau-Reutin – Bregenz – St. Anton – Innsbruck	1 train pair	DB Fernverkehr
ICE 91	Dortmund – (Bochum – Essen – Duisburg – Düsseldorf) / (Hagen – Wuppertal – Solingen) – Cologne – Bonn – Koblenz – Mainz – Frankfurt Airport – Frankfurt – Hanau – Würzburg – Nuremberg – Regensburg – Plattling – Passau – Wels – Linz – St. Pölten – Wien Meidling – Vienna	Some services	DB Fernverkehr
Eurostar	Dortmund – Essen – Duisburg – (Düsseldorf Airport –) Düsseldorf – Cologne – Aachen – Liège-Guillemins – Brussels – Paris	Some services	Eurostar
FLX 30	Berlin Südkreuz – Berlin Hbf – Berlin-Spandau – Hannover – Bielefeld – Dortmund – Essen – Duisburg – Düsseldorf – Cologne (– Aachen)	1-2 train pairs daily	Flixtrain

=== Regional services ===
In local passenger service, Dortmund is served by several regional and S-Bahn lines (as of 2020):

Line	Route	Frequency
RE 1 NRW-Express	Aachen – Eschweiler – Düren – Horrem – Cologne – Düsseldorf – Düsseldorf Airport – Duisburg – Mülheim – Essen – Bochum – Dortmund – Hamm	60 min
RE 3 Rhein-Emscher-Express	Düsseldorf – Duisburg – Oberhausen – Essen-Altenessen – Gelsenkirchen – Wanne-Eickel – Herne – Castrop-Rauxel – Dortmund – Kamen – Hamm	60 min
RE 4 Wupper-Express	Aachen – Mönchengladbach – Düsseldorf – Wuppertal – Hagen – Dortmund	60 mins
RE 6 Rhein-Weser-Express	Minden – Herford – Bielefeld – Hamm – Dortmund – Essen – Mülheim – Duisburg – Düsseldorf Airport – Düsseldorf – Neuss – Cologne – Cologne/Bonn Airport	60 min
RE 11; Rhein-Hellweg-Express	Düsseldorf – Düsseldorf Airport – Duisburg – Mülheim – Essen – Dortmund – Hamm – Paderborn (– Kassel-Wilhelmshöhe)	60 min
RB 32; Rhein-Emscher-Bahn	Duisburg – Oberhausen – Essen-Altenessen – Gelsenkirchen – Wanne-Eickel – Castrop-Rauxel – Dortmund	60 min
RE 34; Dortmund-Siegerland Express	Dortmund – Witten – Iserlohn-Letmathe – Finnentrop – Kreuztal – Siegen	IC 34 and RE 34 together)
RB 43; Emschertal-Bahn	Dorsten – Gladbeck - Wanne-Eickel – Herne – Dortmund	60 min
RB 50; Der Lüner	Münster – Lünen – Dortmund	60 min
RB 51; Westmünsterlandbahn	Dortmund – Lünen – Dülmen – Coesfeld – Gronau – Enschede	60 min
RB 52; Volmetal-Bahn	Lüdenscheid – Lüdenscheid-Brügge – Schalksmühle – Hagen – Dortmund	60 min
RB 53; Ardey-Bahn	Dortmund – Schwerte (Ruhr) – Iserlohn	30–60 min
RE 57; Dortmund-Sauerland-Express	Dortmund – Dortmund-Hörde – Fröndenberg – Arnsberg – Bestwig (branch 1: – Bigge – Winterberg) / (branch 2: – Brilon Wald – Brilon Stadt)	60 min (Dortmund–Bestwig); 120 min (Bestwig–Winterberg/Brilon)
RB 59; Hellweg-Bahn	Dortmund – Holzwickede – Unna – Soest	20/40 min (weekdays); 60 min (Sundays and public holidays)
S1	Dortmund (1) – Bochum – Essen (2) – Mülheim – Duisburg – Düsseldorf Airport – Düsseldorf (3) – Hilden – Solingen (4)	15 min (1–2), 30 min (2–3), 20 min (3–4)
S2	Dortmund – Castrop-Rauxel – Herne (– Wanne-Eickel – Gelsenkirchen – Essen) / (– Recklinghausen)	30 min
S5	Dortmund – Witten (– Wetter – Hagen)	30 mins

=== Light rail ===
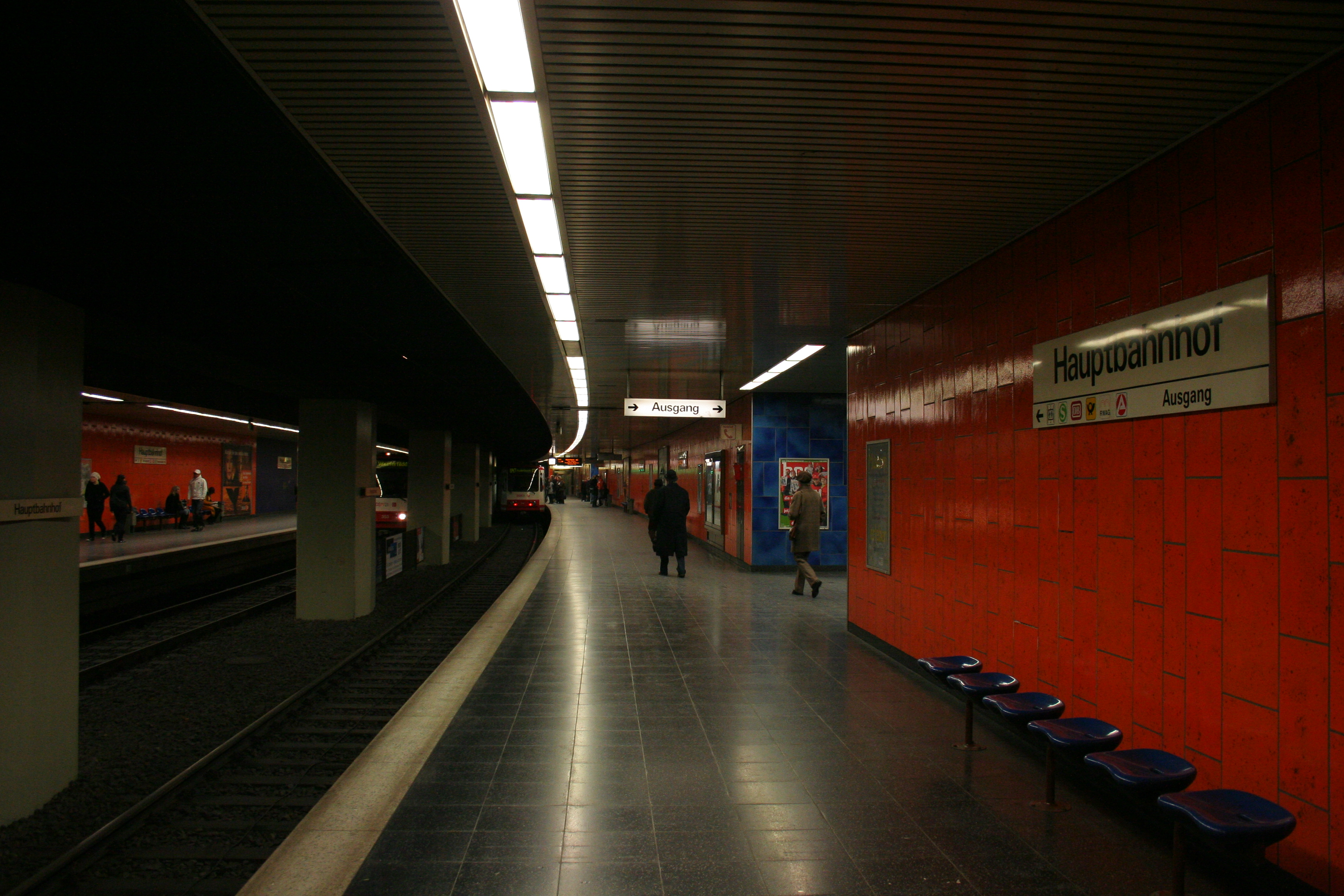
Underground platforms of Dortmund Stadtbahn

The station is served by lines U41, U45, U47 and U49 of the Dortmund Stadtbahn.

∗ U45 becomes at the station Westfalenhallen the line U46 and continues to Brunnenstraße. On match days of the Borussia Dortmund soccer club the line ends instead of the regular terminus Westfalenhallen at the Westfalenstadion station, which is only open on these occasions. In this case it does not continue as U46.

== See also ==
- Rail transport in Germany
- Railway stations in Germany
