= Schwerte (Ruhr) station =

Railway station in Schwerte, Germany

Schwerte (Ruhr)
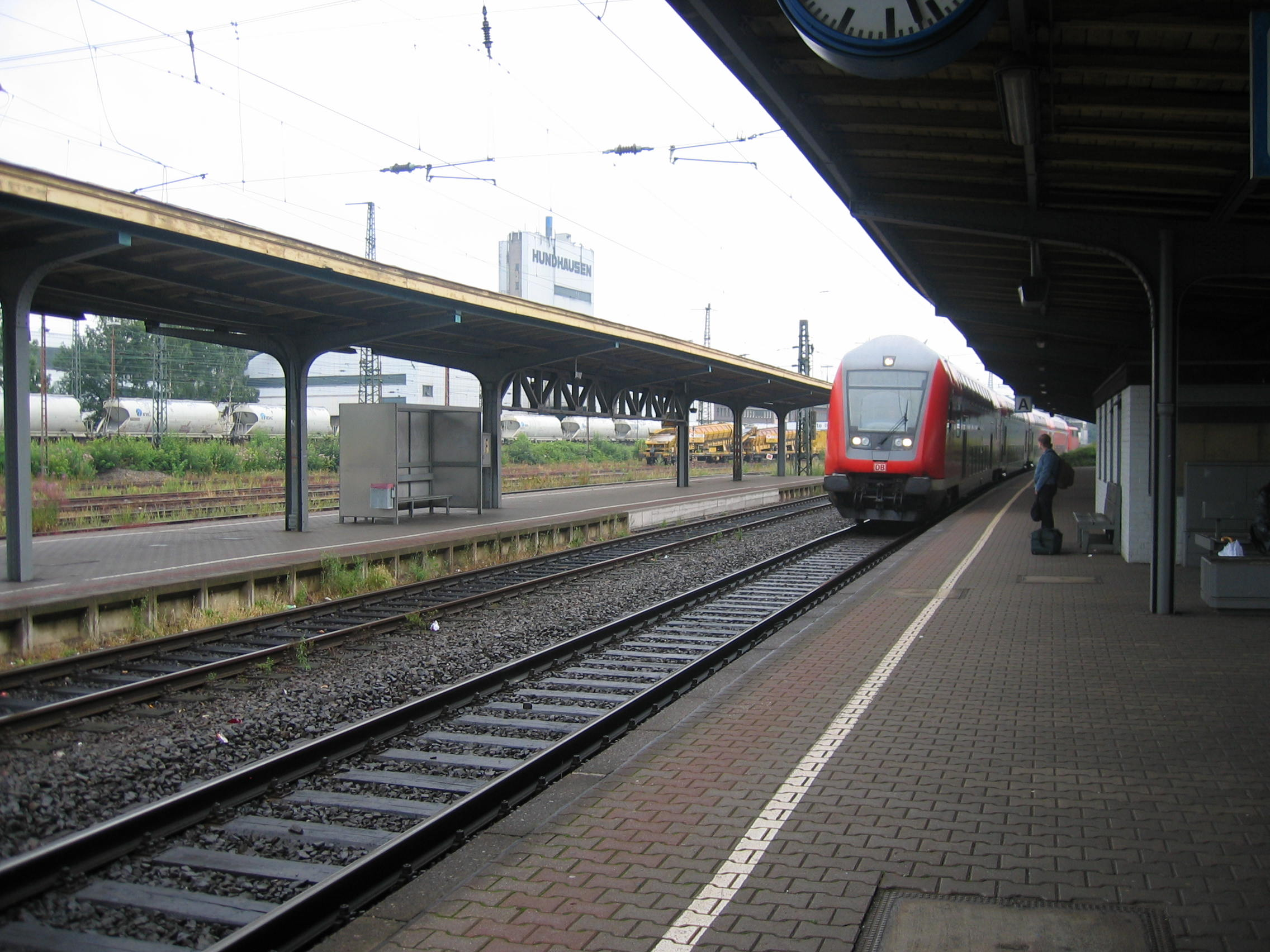

General information
- Location: Bahnhofstr. 35, Schwerte, NRW; Germany
- Coordinates: 51°26′30″N 7°33′31″E
- Lines: Hagen–Hamm (KBS 455); Dortmund–Iserlohn (KBS 433)
- Platforms: 6

Construction
- Accessible: Yes

Other information
- Station code: 5763
- DS100 code: ESRT
- IBNR: 8000037
- Category: 4
- Fare zone: Westfalentarif: 42151
- Website: www.bahnhof.de

History
- Opened: 1 April 1867

Services
Preceding station	DB Regio NRW	Following station
Hagen Hbf Terminus	RE 17	Fröndenberg towards Kassel-Wilhelmshöhe
Dortmund-Aplerbeck Süd towards Dortmund Hbf	RB 53	Ergste towards Iserlohn
Preceding station		Following station
Hagen Hbf towards Venlo	RE 13	Holzwickede towards Hamm (Westf) Hbf
Preceding station	National Express Germany	Following station
Hagen Hbf towards Krefeld Hbf	RE 7 (Rhein-Münsterland-Express)	Holzwickede towards Rheine
Location
- Location within North Rhine-Westphalia

Schwerte station is a through station in the town of Schwerte in the German state of North Rhine-Westphalia. The station was opened with the section of the Hagen–Hamm railway between Hagen and Holzwickede, opened by the Bergisch-Märkische Railway Company (German: Bergisch-Märkische Eisenbahn-Gesellschaft, BME) on 1 April 1867. It has six platform tracks and it is classified by Deutsche Bahn as a category 4 station.

The station is served by the Rhein-Münsterland-Express (RE 7) between Krefeld and Rheine, the Maas-Wupper-Express (RE 13) between Venlo and Hamm, the Sauerland-Express (RE 17) between Hagen and Warburg or Kassel-Wilhelmshöhe and the Ardey-Bahn (RB 53) between Dortmund and Iserlohn, each hourly. In the 2026 timetable, the following services stop at the station:

Line	Line name	Service	Route
RE 7	Rhein-Münsterland-Express	(Rheine –) Münster – Hamm – Unna – Schwerte – Hagen – Wuppertal – Solingen – Cologne – Krefeld	60 min
RE 13	Maas-Wupper-Express	Hamm – Unna – Schwerte – Hagen – Wuppertal – Düsseldorf – Mönchengladbach – Venlo	60 min
RE 17	Sauerland-Express	Hagen – Schwerte – Arnsberg (Westf) – Brilon-Wald – Warburg (–Kassel Hbf – Kassel-Wilhelmshöhe)	60 min
RB 53	Ardey-Bahn	Dortmund – Schwerte – Iserlohn	60 min
