= Iserlohn station =

Railway station in Iserlohn, Germany

Iserlohn
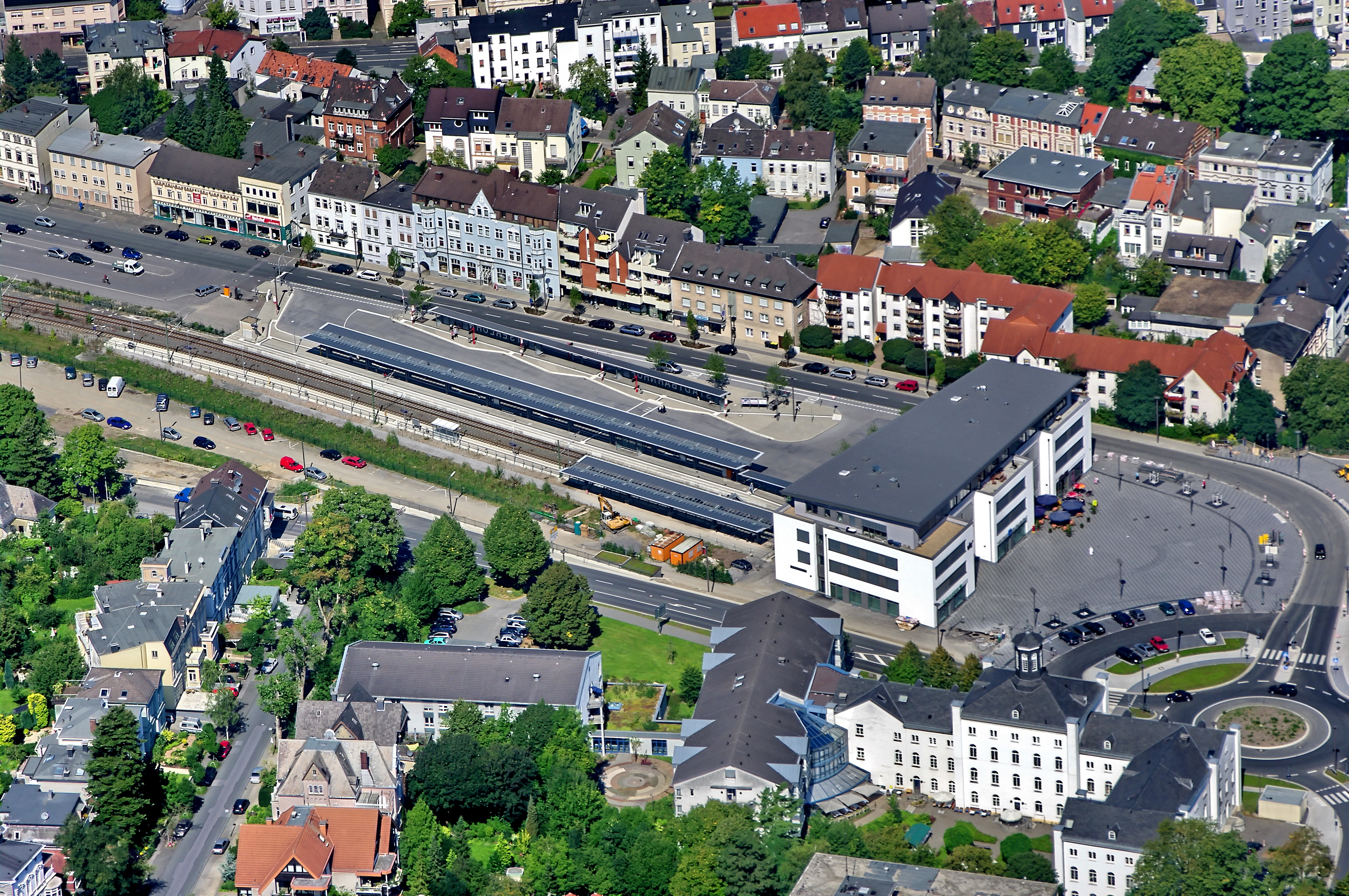
- Stadtbahnhof ("city station") of 2008

General information
- Location: Iserlohn, NRW; Germany
- Coordinates: 51°22′23″N 7°41′32″E
- Lines: Ardey Railway; Iserlohn–Letmathe
- Platforms: 2

Construction
- Accessible: Yes

Other information
- Station code: 3006
- DS100 code: EIL
- Category: 6
- Fare zone: Westfalentarif: 48611
- Website: www.bahnhof.de

History
- Opened: 31 March 1864

Passengers
- About 3000

Services
Preceding station	VIAS	Following station
Letmathe-Dechenhöhle towards Essen Hbf	RE 16	Terminus
Letmathe-Dechenhöhle towards Hagen Hbf	RB 91	Terminus
Preceding station	DB Regio NRW	Following station
Letmathe-Dechenhöhle towards Dortmund Hbf	RB 53	Terminus
Location

Iserlohn station is located in central Iserlohn in the German state of North Rhine-Westphalia. It is at the end of two single-track lines, the Ardey Railway (Ardeybahn) from Dortmund and Schwerte and the line from Iserlohn-Letmathe with services from Essen via Hagen. Since 2008, it has operated from a rebuilt station called the Stadtbahnhof (city station).

== History ==
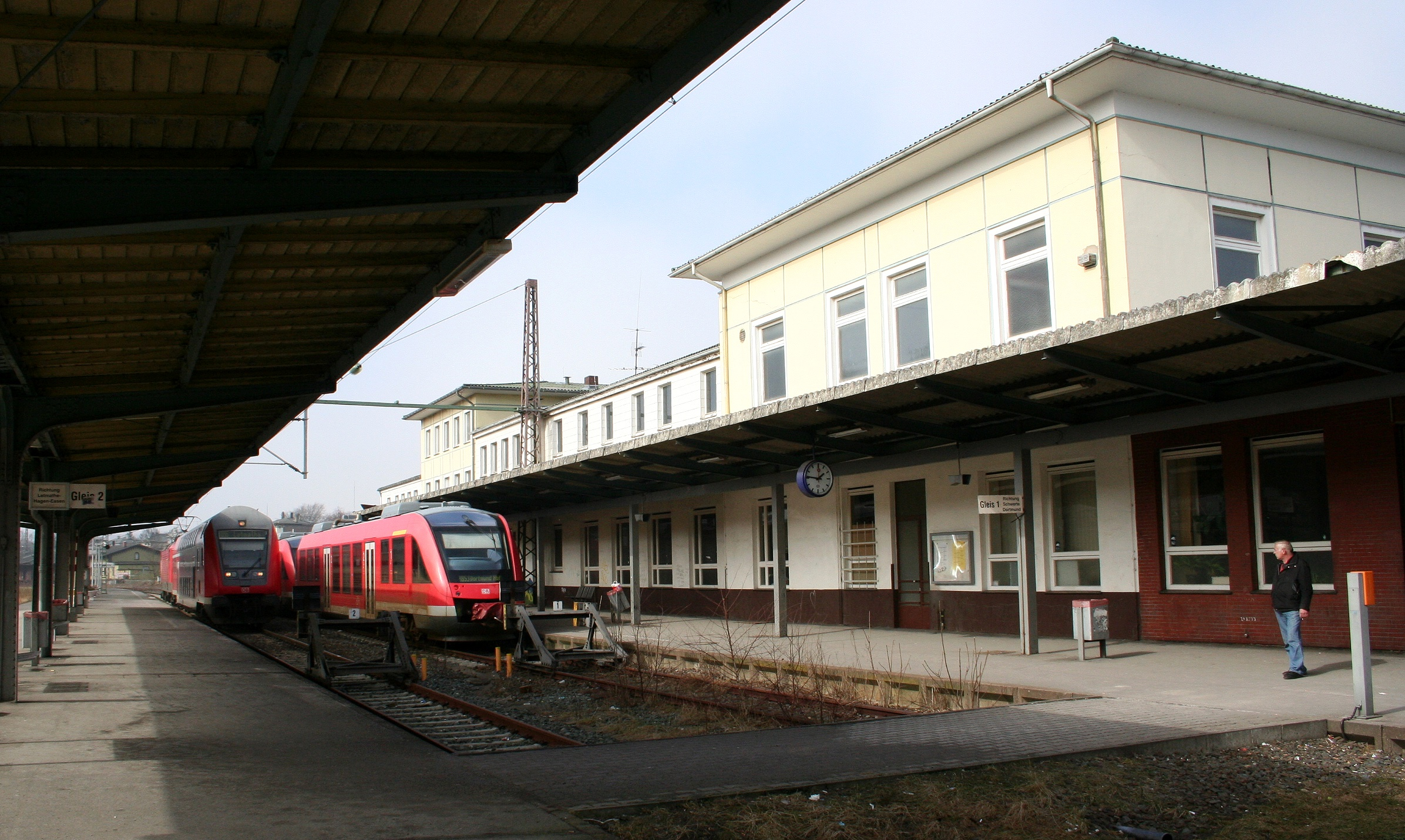
Platforms in 2006

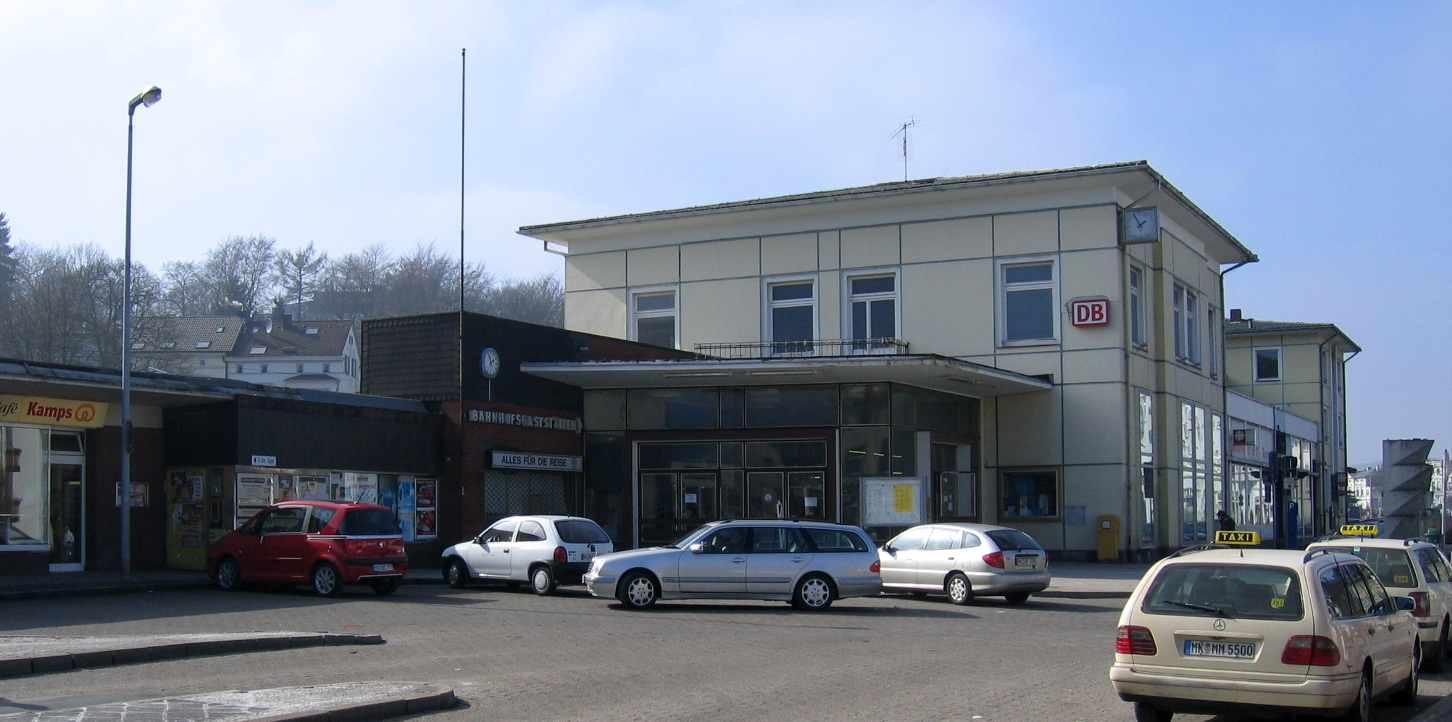
Station building in 2006

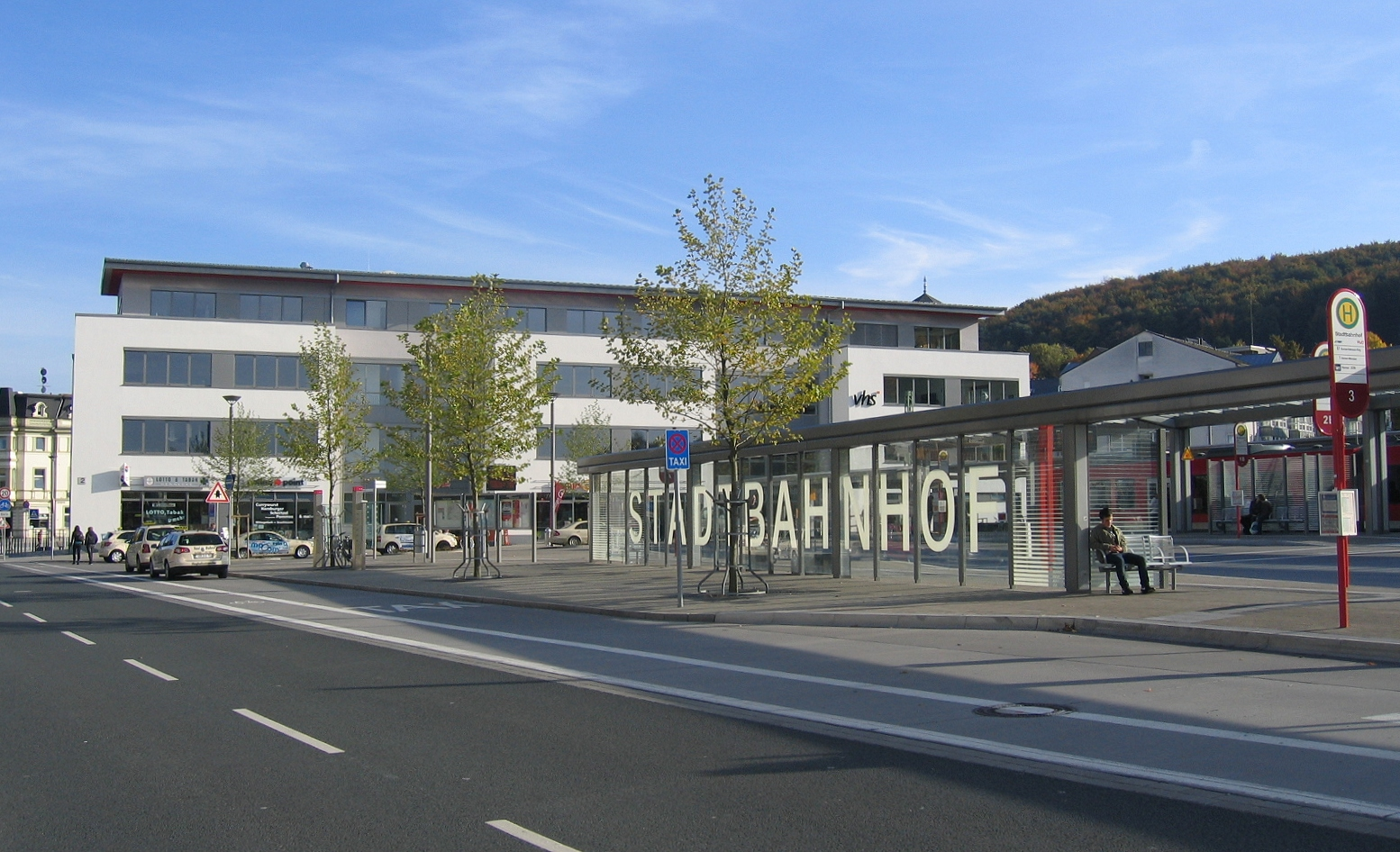
Station building since 2008

Iserlohn station was opened in 1864, together with the line from Letmathe, which was extended to Hemer in 1885, connecting to Fröndenberg. In 1910 the Ardey Railway to Schwerte was added. In 1966, the old station building was replaced by a new building.

The Letmathe–Fröndenberg railway between Iserlohn Ost station and Hemer was closed in 1989 because of the deterioration of a bridge on the line, which was not considered worth repairing. The line between Iserlohn and Iserlohn Ost was still used by freight trains up to 1995. Since the dismantling of the line and the removal of the last set of points, Iserlohn station has been classified as a Haltepunkt (halt). However, the Zweckverband SPNV Ruhr-Lippe (association for the promotion of public transport in Ruhr-Lippe, ZRL) intends to build a connection between the two lines, including points, which would restore its status as a bahnhof (station).

The station building of the 1960s was demolished in 2007/2008 and rebuilt as a so-called city station by a private investor. In addition to the typical tenants (ticket counter, food sales), the station building also has a tourist information office and a community college. In addition to the new station building built in 2008, the platforms, a new bus station, a railway station forecourt and a roundabout have been built or rebuilt. There is also a parking garage with 189 parking spaces.

On 18 September 2010, the station was proclaimed the first Wanderbahnhof ("hiking station") in North Rhine-Westphalia because of its connections and proximity to hiking infrastructure.

== Operations ==
Platform 1 is a combined platform. Trains running on the Ardey Railway stop on one side and Märkische Verkehrsgesellschaft (Märkische Transport Company) buses stop on the other side.

Although the new station building is now a terminus, the reactivation of the line between Hemer and Iserlohn is still possible (the track would be placed between the station building and a retaining wall and would continue over the roundabout).

Iserlohn station is served by one Regional-Express and two Regionalbahn services:

Line	Line name	Route	Frequency
RE 16	Ruhr-Lenne-Express	Essen – Bochum – Witten – Hagen – Iserlohn-Letmathe – Iserlohn	60 min
RB 53	Ardey-Bahn	Dortmund – Schwerte (Ruhr) – Iserlohn	60 min peak: 30 min
RB 91	Ruhr-Sieg-Bahn	Hagen – Iserlohn-Letmathe – (Finnentrop – Siegen) / Iserlohn	60 min

=== Bus routes ===
Line	Route	Frequency
S 1	Lüdenscheid, Sauerfeld ZOB (bus station) – MVG-Verwaltung – Altena, Mühlenrahmede – Bahnhof (station) – Nachrodt-Wiblingwerde – Iserlohn, Stadtbahnhof – Konrad-Adenauer-Ring ZOB	60min peak: 30min
S 3	Iserlohn, Stadtbahnhof – Hemer, Niederhemer – Menden, Bahnhof	60 min
1	Hagen, Hohenlimburg Bf. – Iserlohn, Letmathe Mitte – Grüner Talstraße – Stadtbahnhof – Konrad-Adenauer-Ring ZOB – Hemer, Westiger Kreuz – Hemer ZOB – Becke – Menden, Battenfeld – Bahnhof – Hönnenwerth	15 min
4	Iserlohn, Stadtbahnhof – ZOB – Kesbern – Hemer, Ihmert – Iserlohn, Dahlsen – Dannenhöfer – Grüner Talstraße – Dröschede – Stadtbahnhof	Tax-bus: 120 min
7	Iserlohn, Brandkopf – Stadtbahnhof – ZOB/Knipp – Sonnenhöhe	60 min
11	Iserlohn, Im Lau – Wohnpark Buchenwäldchen – ZOB – Hemberg – Liebigstraße – Stadtbahnhof – ZOB – Wohnpark Buchenwäldchen – Im Lau	60 min
12	Iserlohn, Im Lau – Wohnpark Buchenwäldchen – ZOB – Stadtbahnhof – Liebigstraße – Hemberg – ZOB – Wohnpark Buchenwäldchen – Im Lau	60 min
13	Iserlohn, Gerlingsen – Hauptpost – Stadtbahnhof – ZOB – Seilerseebad – Hemer, ZOB – Sundwig	60 min
14	Iserlohn, Gerlingsen – Hauptpost – Stadtbahnhof – ZOB – Seilersee – Griesenbrauck – Rombrock	60 min
15	Iserlohn, Letmathe – Oestrich Kirche – Dröschede – Stadtbahnhof – ZOB – Hombruch	30 min
16	Iserlohn, Letmathe – Am Dorfanger – Stadtbahnhof – ZOB – Wolfskoben – Echelnteichweg	30 min
17	Iserlohn, Lössel – Roden – Grüner Talstraße – Stadtbahnhof – Sonnenhöhe	60 min
18	Iserlohn, Stadtbahnhof – Kalthof – Drüpplingsen/Helle – Hennen	60 min
22	Iserlohn, Stadtbahnhof – ZOB – Sümmern – Menden, Battenfeld – Lendringsen – Hüingsen	30 min
R30	Iserlohn, Stadtbahnhof – Kalthof – Hennen – Rheinen – Geisecke – Schwerte Bahnhof	60 min
204	Iserlohn, Realschule Bömberg – Stadtbahnhof – Hemer, Ihmert – Iserl., Dahlsen – Dannenhöfer – Saatschule	Not regular
214	Iserlohn, Gerlingsen - Hauptpost - ZOB - Stadtbahnhof - Seilersee - Griesenbrauck - Rombrock - Hennen	Not regular
218	Iserlohn, Lössel – Dröschede – Gesamtschule Gerlingsen – Stadtbahnhof – Letmathe Gymnasium	Not regular
