= Sauerland Net =

The Sauerland Net (German: Sauerland-Netz) is a group of railway services in the western Sauerland and the eastern Ruhr of the German state of North Rhine-Westphalia and consists of four Regionalbahn services, RB 43 (Dortmund–Dorsten), RB 52 (Dortmund–Hagen–Lüdenscheid), RB 53 (Dortmund–Schwerte–Iserlohn) and RB 54 (Unna–Fröndenberg–Menden–Neuenrade), and the Regional-Express service RE 57 (Dortmund–Bestwig–Winterberg/Brilon Stadt). The RB 43 also carries the brand name of the Emschertal-Bahn, the RB 52 is called the Volmetal-Bahn, the RB 53 is called the Ardey-Bahn, the RB 54 is called the Hönnetal-Bahn and the RE 57 is called the Dortmund Sauerland-Express. In December 2004, DB Regio NRW took over or retained operations of these services. Previously the RB 53, RB 54 and RE 57 had been operated by DB Regio NRW and RB 52 had been operated by the Dortmund-Märkische Eisenbahn (DME).

In December 2004, DB Regio NRW took over the operation of the RB 52 from Dortmund-Märkische Eisenbahn. The RB 53, RB 54 and RE 57 were already operated by the DB Regio NRW. DB Regio NRW took over operation of the RB 43 from NordWestBahn in December 2015.

With the award of operations from December 2016, the RE 17 service also became part of the Sauerland network.

== Tender ==
The Zweckverband Nahverkehr Westfalen-Lippe (local transport association of Westphalia-Lippe, NWL) published a call for tenders for the operation of passenger services on the Sauerland Network from December 2016 in the Official Journal of the European Union on 9 October 2012. As a result, Regional-Express services RE 17 and 57 and Regionalbahn services RB 52, 53 and 54 might have had a new operator. Some improvements were to be made on trains for the carriage of the disabled and there would be more space for bicycles, more guards, ticket machines on the trains rather than on the platforms, as well as improved connections in Menden (to Dortmund) and Schwerte (to Münster). It would involve about 5.6 million train-kilometres a year, at a cost of €9–10 per train-km, a total cost of about €50 to 55 million. Because the operation of the network was to be contracted for a period of 12 years, it will be worth more than €600 million.

Competition was considered necessary in order to maintain fares. The NWL offered financing for the rollingstock through the municipal budget and to reimburse the top three losing tenderers tender costs of up to €100,000. Passengers would benefit from the competition in the Sauerland as the trains would be accessible to the disabled with entrance heights of 1.2 metres as was already the case with the Sauerland-Express. Due to the great success of the Ruhr Valley Cycle Route, RE 17 would have additional space for bicycles (which already existed on RE 57 services). In addition, the NWL specified that future trains on the Upper Ruhr Valley Railway (RE 17/57) would have a top speed of 140 km/h. Thus, the journey time to Schwerte would be cut, which would allow a connection to Münster. The timetable would be changed to ensure a quick connection at Fröndenberg from Neuenrade and at Menden to Dortmund. The previous level of service would be maintained. The same applied to the sale of tickets at DB ticket offices and DB agencies. However, ticket machines would be available in trains from the end of 2016 and no longer on the platforms, as this would prevent damage from vandalism. After 7 PM all trains will be staffed with on-board staff, this would increase total staff on the trains.

The contract was awarded to DB Regio, which would use LINK (II or III) DMUs made by the Polish manufacturer PESA.

== Operations ==
The DB Regio NRW procured 21 new LINT 41 railcars for operation on the Sauerland network, which were manufactured by Alstom. These replaced older vehicles such as the class VT 628 or Bombardier Talent railcars. Vehicles from the class 612 were also used. Since 2018, most of the Sauerland network has been equipped with the Pesa Link (class 632 and 633) multiple units planned at the letting of the new tender in 2013, and since the 2021/2022 timetable change, only the Pesa Link multiple units have run. The old Talent railcars are only kept as reserve vehicles.

== RE 17 – Sauerland-Express ==
RE 17: Sauerland Express

Overview
- Locale: North Rhine-Westphalia, Germany

Service
- Route number: 430, 435

The Sauerland-Express RE 17 is a regional express line in local rail passenger transport in North Rhine-Westphalia and North Hesse, which runs from Hagen to Warburg and every two hours to Kassel-Wilhelmshöhe. The service is contracted by VRR, Zweckverband_Nahverkehr_Westfalen-Lippe (NWL) and NVV and operated by DB Regio NRW.

With the award of operations from December 2016, the line is part of the Sauerland Net. The line was previously contracted from DB Regio as part of directly awarded large transport contracts.

== RB 43 – Emschertal-Bahn ==
RB 43: Emschertal-Bahn

Overview
- Locale: North Rhine-Westphalia, Germany

Service
- Route number: 426

The Emschertal-Bahn RB 43 service connects Dortmund with Dorsten via Gladbeck Ost. From 2006 to December 2015 it was operated by NordWestBahn, then operations were taken over by DB Regio after a tender.

The RB 43 was integrated into the new timetable at the timetable change in December 2015 and an additional train was offered in the evenings.

=== Services ===
Initially, class 628 sets were used, but Alstom Coradia LINT 27 (class 640) sets were used from June 2016. Pesa Link railcars are currently running.

On working days an average of 3,500 passengers use the RB 43.

== RB 52 – Volmetal-Bahn ==
RB 52: Volmetalbahn

Overview
- Locale: North Rhine-Westphalia, Germany

Service
- Route number: 434

The Volmetal-Bahn RB 52 service connects Dortmund, Hagen and Lüdenscheid.

On its way from Dortmund Hauptbahnhof to Lüdenscheid station, the service first runs over a section of the Dortmund–Soest railway and then over a section of the Düsseldorf-Derendorf–Dortmund Süd railway. It runs over the Hagen–Dieringhausen railway (also known as the Volmetalbahn, meaning Volme Valley Railway) from Hagen Hauptbahnhof to Lüdenscheid-Brügge station. Finally, it reverses direction and runs over the Brügge–Lüdenscheid railway from Brügge station to the higher Lüdenscheid station.

=== Services ===
The service runs every hour, seven days a week, except that services run every two hours on Sunday mornings.

=== Planning ===
The Volmetal-Bahn will in future run an hour earlier from Lüdenscheid to Hagen on Saturdays and Sundays. In addition, the Märkischer Kreis is campaigning for a 30-minute cycle of the Volmetal-Bahn from Lüdenscheid via Hagen to Dortmund, since Lüdenscheid station would support higher demand.

== RB 53 – Ardey-Bahn ==
RB 53: Hellweg-Bahn

Overview
- Locale: North Rhine-Westphalia, Germany

Service
- Route number: 433

The Ardey-Bahn RB 53 service connects Dortmund, Schwerte and Iserlohn. It follows the Ardey Railway (Ardeybahn in German).

=== Services ===
The service runs every half hour during the week and every hour on the weekend.

== RB 54 – Hönnetal-Bahn ==
RB 54: Hönnetal-Bahn

Overview
- Locale: North Rhine-Westphalia, Germany

Service
- Route number: 437

The Hönnetal-Bahn RB 54 service connects Unna, Fröndenberg and Neuenrade. The service follows the Fröndenberg–Kamen railway, the Letmathe–Fröndenberg railway and the Hönne Valley Railway (Hönnetalnbahn in German).

=== Services ===
The service runs hourly during the week. On Sundays services run every two hours between Menden and Neuenrade.

The Unna–Fröndenberg section has been closed since summer 2022 and a rail replacement bus service has operated due to damage to the railway embankment caused by badgers.

== RE 57 – Dortmund-Sauerland-Express ==
RE 57: Dortmund-Sauerland-Express

Overview
- Locale: North Rhine-Westphalia, Germany

Service
- Route number: 435, 438

The Dortmund-Sauerland-Express RE 57 connects Dortmund and Fröndenberg with Winterberg and Brilon Stadt. It runs along the Ardey Railway, the Upper Ruhr Valley Railway and then on either the Nuttlar–Frankenberg railway or the Alme Valley Railway.

=== Services ===
The service runs hourly during the week. It runs alternately to Winterberg or Brilon Stadt.

== Fares ==
The following fares apply to the Sauerland Net: the Verkehrsverbund Rhein-Ruhr (Rhine-Ruhr transport association) fares in the Dortmund and Hagen areas, the Verkehrsgemeinschaft Ruhr-Lippe (Ruhr-Lippe transport community) fares in the Sauerland/Ruhr-Lippe fare zone and the NRW statewide fares.

== See also ==
- List of regional railway lines in North Rhine-Westphalia
