= Ardey Railway =

Dortmund–Iserlohn railway
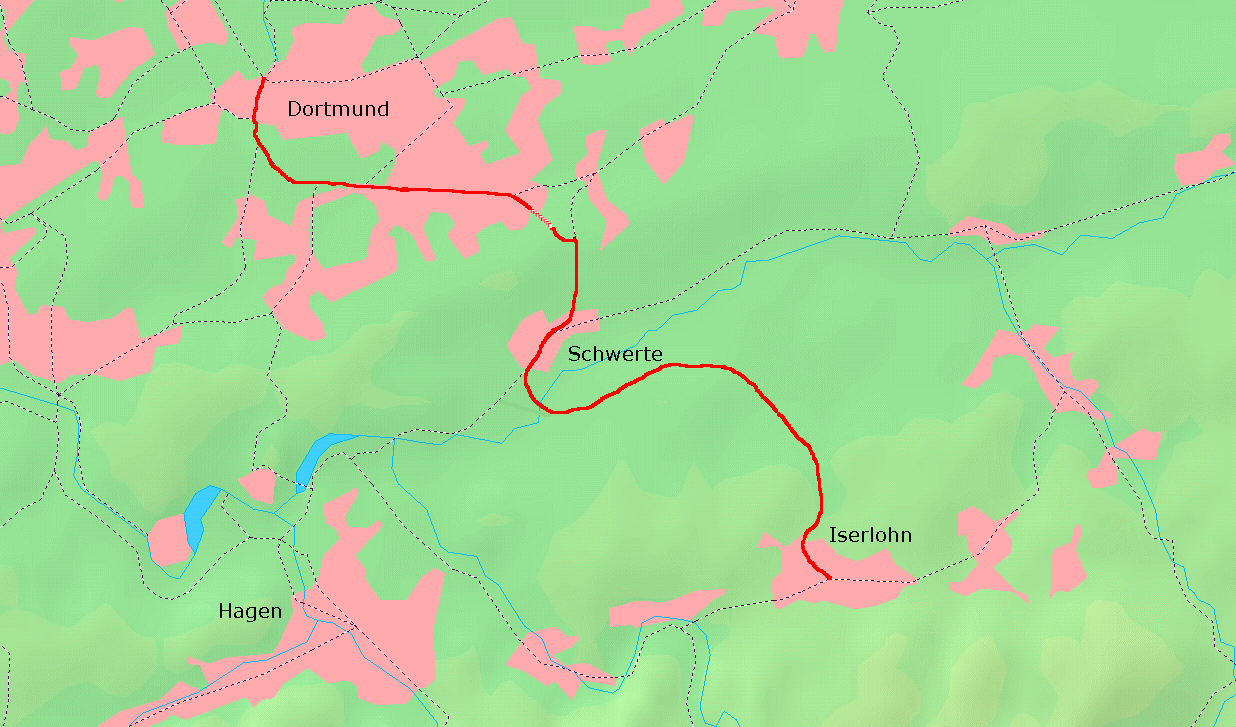

Overview
- Line number: 2103 (Dortmund–Soest); 2113 (Dortmund-Hörde–Schwerte); 2841 (Schwerte–Iserlohn)
- Locale: North Rhine-Westphalia, Germany

Service
- Route number: 433

Technical
- Line length: 38 km (24 mi)
- Number of tracks: 2: Dortmund Hbf–Schwerte
- Track gauge: 1,435 mm (4 ft 8 1/2 in) standard gauge
- Operating speed: Dortmund-Hörde–Schwerte: 90 km/h (56 mph) (max); Schwerte-Iserlohn:: 100 km/h (62 mph) (max)

The Ardey Railway (German: Ardeybahn) is a 38 km long railway line running from Dortmund via Schwerte to Iserlohn (KBS 433) in the German state of North Rhine-Westphalia.

== Route ==
The section between Dortmund Central Station and Dortmund-Horde part of the railway route Dortmund-Soest, is double track and electrified and classified as a mainline railway. The northern part of the Ardey Railway between Dortmund-Horde and Schwerte is a double-track and non-electrified main line. Its maximum speed is 90 km/h. The southern section between Schwerte and Iserlohn is a single-track non-electrified branch line, with a passing loop at Kalthof. Most of this section can be run at 100 km/h.

The Letmathe–Fröndenberg railway has been closed between Iserlohn and Menden and there is currently no connection between the Ardey Railway and the line to Letmathe in Iserlohn. Iserlohn is therefore formally not a Bahnhof (station, which under German regulations must have at least one set of points) but instead a Haltepunkt (halt) on two lines. However, the Zweckverband SPNV Ruhr-Lippe (association for the promotion of public transport in Ruhr-Lippe, ZRL) intends to build a connection between the two lines, including points, which would restore its status as a station.

== History ==
After Iserlohn had been connected by rail to Letmathe in 1864, the chamber of commerce and industry campaigned in 1882 for the construction of a railway to the north towards Schwerte. Against resistance mainly from businessmen in the Lenne valley, who advocated lines from Letmathe to Schwerte or from Iserlohn to Altena, especially the then owner of the nickel plants in Iserlohn and Schwerte, Dr Theodor Fleitmann. He supported the construction of a railway through the valley of the Elsebach. The district (Landkreis), however, decided that the line should be built along the Baarbach to promote industry in Sümmern, Kalthof and Hennen. After the death of Fleitmann in 1904, the construction started in 1907 and it was completed a year later. Money provided in Fleitmann's will for the construction of a railway was not used because it had been earmarked for the route favoured by him.

The construction of the railway was relatively expensive; 200,000 cubic metres of limestone were blasted just for a cutting in Iserlohn, where numerous fossils were found. Several embankments and bridges had to be built on the course of the line. The recently completed bridge over the Ruhr were severely damaged in a flood in February 1909 and had to be replaced. Overall, the line between Schwerte and Iserlohn had to overcome a height difference of 130 m. The construction cost 6 million marks, covering, among other things, the erection of 39 engineering structures and the moving of about one million m^{3} of earth.

The opening ceremony took place on 30 September 1910, coinciding with the last stagecoach ride from Schwerte to Iserlohn, the day after scheduled traffic commenced. The other part of the line from Schwerte to Dortmund-Horde was opened two years later in October 1912 for freight operations and in January 1913 for passenger operations. In contrast to the first section, this line was built for its full length as double track.

In addition to the crossing loop at Kalthof, there was also a crossing loop at Ergste until 1981. Therefore, it had a second platform, traces of which can still be seen.

There is no freight traffic on the line any more. Sidings are still present in Kalthof (for Kettenwerk Thiele) and Hennen for the occasional transport of RWE transformers to the substation in Sümmern.

In the 1990s and the early 2000s, services were provided by class 624 railcars. In 2002, DB Regio NRW won the contract for the so-called Sauerland Net (German: Sauerland-Netz; apart from this line, it also includes the Dortmund-Sauerland-Express, the Volmetal-Bahn and the Hönnetal-Bahn) and thus has the right to operate the line for another 12 years from the timetable change in December 2004, using Alstom Coradia LINT 41 (class 648) railcars.

Passenger demand on the Dortmund-Horde–Schwerte section rose from about 3,000 to about 4,500 passengers between 1997 and 2008. Also on the Schwerte–Iserlohn section there has been passenger growth of about 50% to about 1,600 passengers a day.

== Services ==
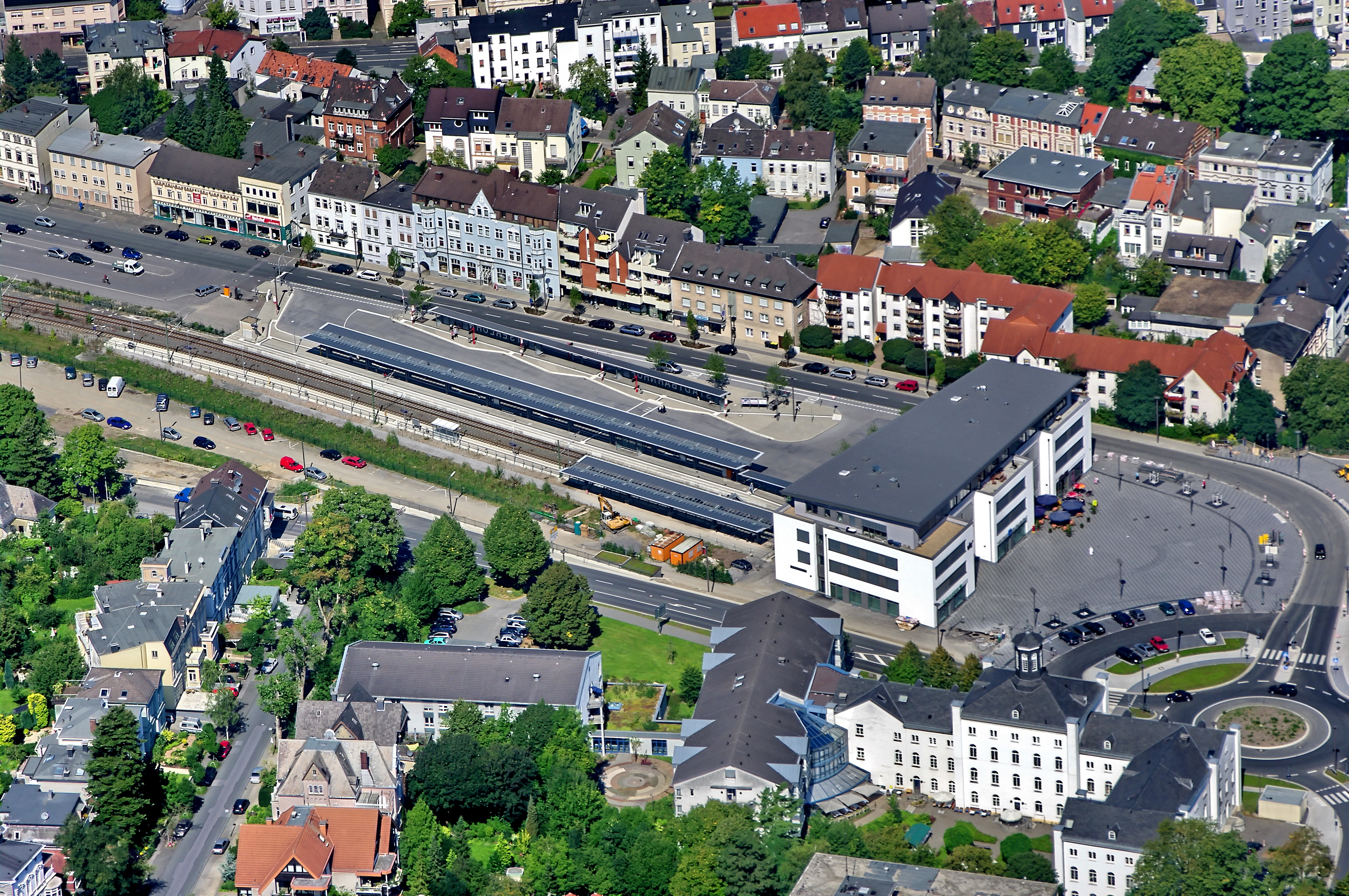
Iserlohn state railway station

The Regionalbahn service RB 53 (Ardey-Bahn) operates

- daily every hour between Dortmund and Iserlohn and
- from Monday to Friday every 30 minutes during the peak hour between Dortmund and Schwerte, connecting to Iserlohn.

The average speed is highly directional. So trains to Dortmund from Iserlohn have an average speed of only 44 km/h, while trains from Dortmund to Iserlohn average 51 km/h. This is partly due to the out-dated signalling in Kalthof, which does not allow the simultaneous entry and exit of trains, meaning that trains to Dortmund have to wait seven minutes for the oncoming trains, and also to the coupling of trains in Schwerte (also taking seven minutes). In the opposite direction the uncoupling of trains in Schwerte takes just three minutes and no specific period is required for stopping at Kalthof. Shortening of the travel time to Dortmund is planned.

Rail services from Ardey are operated by DB Regio NRW, using LINT 41 diesel railcars in single or double traction, which are capable of operating at 120 km/h. Coupling/uncoupling is usually carried out in Schwerte. Occasionally LINT 27 (class 640) or class 628 DMUs are used.

== Future ==
The following upgrades to the line are proposed:

- In Iserlohn, a set of points is to be installed to reconnect the line to the line to the railway to Letmathe.
- the signalling in Kalthof will be modernised so that simultaneous entrances to the station are possible, allowing the running time to be reduced by up to seven minutes (possibly by 2015).
- In Schwerte the passing track will be adapted so that passing trains can run faster.
- Consideration is being given to having additional peak-hour trains skip some of the intermediate stations between Dortmund and Iserlohn. Thus, these trains would take just 35 to 38 minutes on the Dortmund–Iserlohn route.
- There is a long-term plan to extend the provision of services at 30-minute intervals all day from the Dortmund–Schwerte section to the Schwerte–Iserlohn section.

== Notable ==
It is interesting that the line does not have a single level crossing, but instead many overpasses and underpasses were built for even the smallest dirt roads, including single-lane tracks on high embankments.
