= Scherfede station =

Railway station in Warburg, Germany

Scherfede
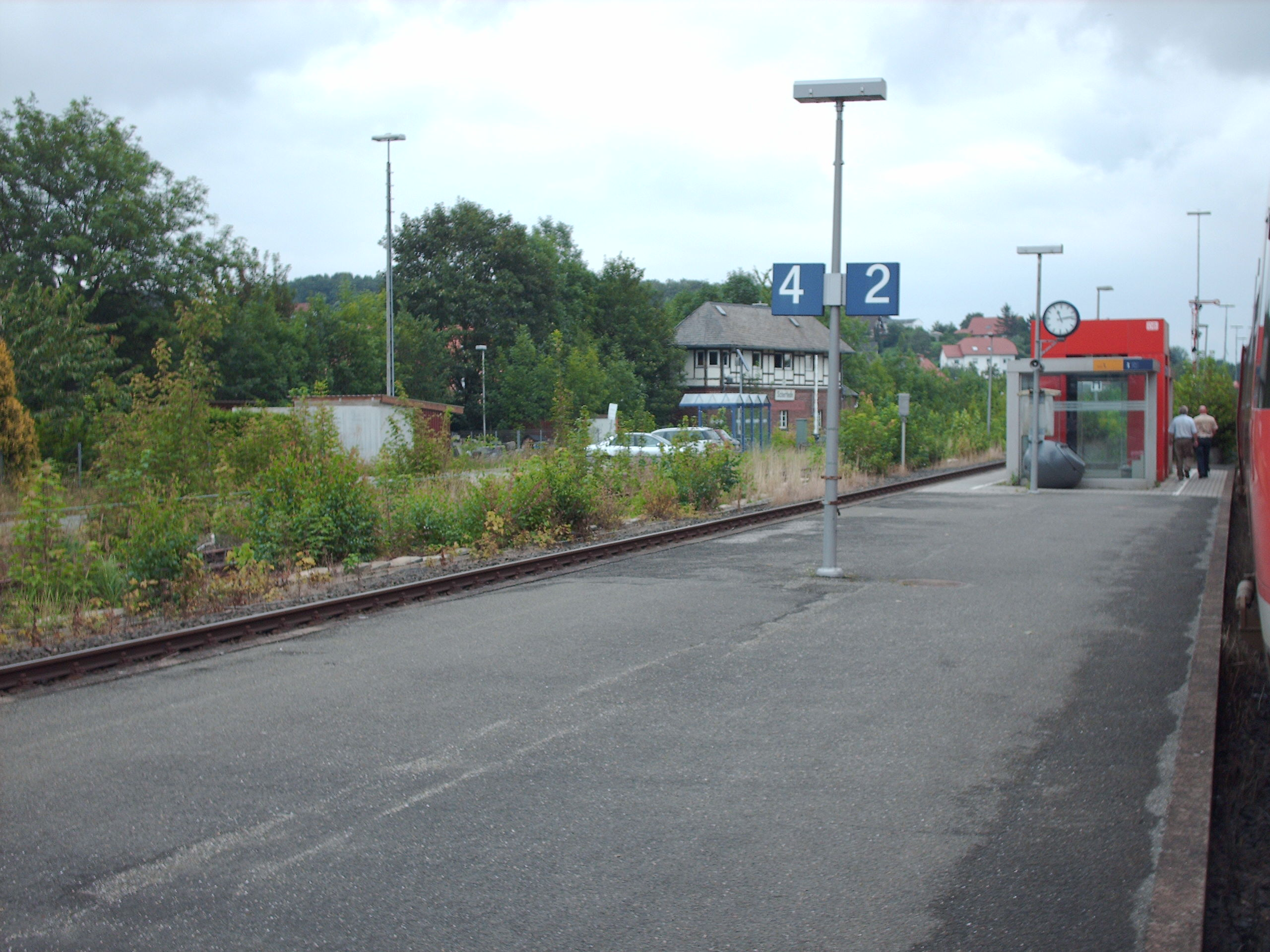
- Island platform at Scherfede station

General information
- Location: Scherfede, NRW; Germany
- Coordinates: 51°31′29″N 9°2′50″E
- Line: Upper Ruhr Valley Railway
- Platforms: 2

Construction
- Accessible: Yes

Other information
- Station code: 5559
- DS100 code: HSCD
- IBNR: 8005336
- Category: 6
- Fare zone: Westfalentarif: 77973
- Website: www.bahnhof.de

History
- Opened: 10 February 1873

Services
| Preceding station | DB Regio NRW | Following station |
|---|---|---|
| Westheim (Westf) towards Hagen Hbf | RE 17 | Warburg towards Kassel-Wilhelmshöhe |
Location

Scherfede station is located in the Warburg district of Rimbeck in the German state of North Rhine-Westphalia. A busy locomotive workshop developed there up to the mid-20th century.

== History ==
In 1872, the first locomotive ran on Hagen–Warburg–Kassel line (Upper Ruhr Valley Railway) through Scherfede station.

The Holzminden–Scherfede railway was opened four years later on 15 October 1876. Passenger traffic was abandoned on this line on 2 June 1984 and freight was abandoned on this line from Scherfede on 10 June 2001. The establishment of this line made Scherfede into a junction station, which led to the establishment of an independent railway workshop. West of the rollingstock depot, there was (until the closure of the workshop) a 17-road semicircular roundhouse furnished with workshop spaces.

Before and during the Second World War, the importance of the station and the railway workshop rose. More than 100 trains ran on the east–west route each day and numerous trains were assembled in the station. Air raids during the war inflicted severe damage, while the roof of the roundhouse in the workshop was destroyed. On 22 February 1945, an air raid on Scherfede station completely destroyed a signal box and several buildings in the area were damaged by incendiary projectiles. Three people were killed. On 21 March 1945 there was another air raid. On 3 April 1945, the town and the station were occupied by American soldiers after the withdrawal of German troops. During the food shortage immediately after the war, the station was often used by urban women travelling to buy food (on Hamsterfahrten, literally “hamster rides”) in the fertile Warburger Börde (the rolling country around Warburg). The station, workshop and Bahnmeisterei (track maintenance supervisor's office) included about 400 employees at this time. In subsequent years, its importance declined greatly. The workshop lost its independence and was operated from May 1950 for a short time as a branch of the Warburg workshop. Since the mid-1950s, the site has been privately operated. Roads 16 and 17 of the locomotive shed have remained, while the water tower was demolished in the early 1970s.

The station building was demolished in 1983.

There were two signal boxes at Scherfede station, which were taken into operation in 1915. The western signal box is no longer operational, but it is privately used, while the Eastern signal box is still operated. Scherfede station is not yet connected to an electronic interlocking.

== Current operation ==
The Regional-Express service between Hagen and Warburg/Kassel (RE 17: the Sauerland-Express) stops in Scherfede. Buses also operate to Paderborn.

| Line | Line name | Route | Frequency |
|---|---|---|---|
| RE 17 | Sauerland-Express | Hagen – Schwerte - Fröndenberg – Arnsberg (Westf) – Scherfede – Warburg (– Kassel-Wilhelmshöhe) | 60 min / (120 min) |
