= Hofgeismar station =

Railway station in Hofgeismar, Germany

Hofgeismar
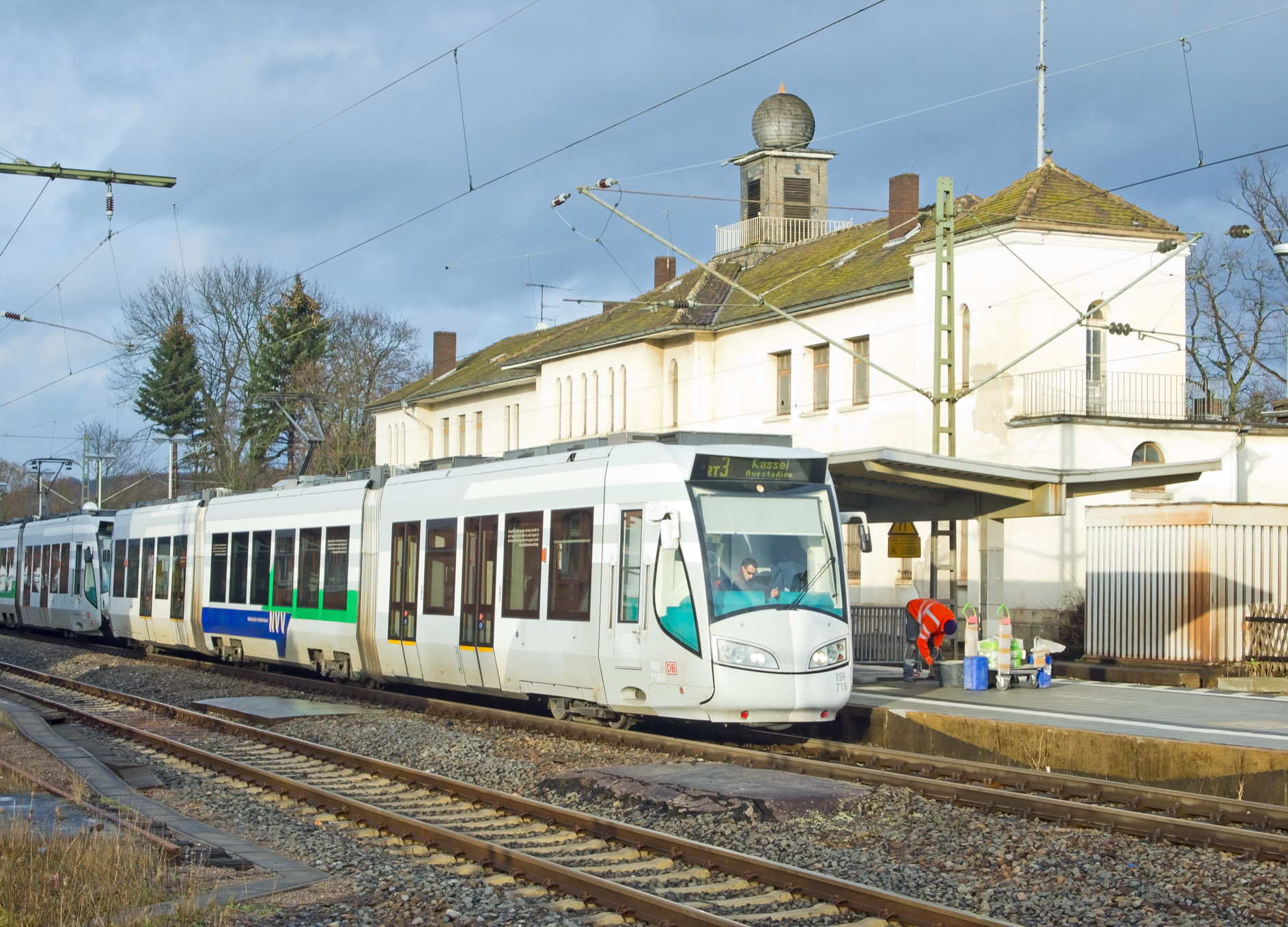
- Hofgeismar railway station

General information
- Location: Hofgeismar, Hesse; Germany
- Coordinates: 51.4991°N 9.3959°E
- Owner: DB Netz
- Operator: DB Station&Service
- Line: Kassel–Warburg railway
- Platforms: 2

Other information
- Station code: 2825
- DS100 code: FLST
- Category: 4
- Fare zone: NVV: 3130
- Website: www.bahnhof.de

Services
Preceding station	National Express Germany	Following station
Warburg towards Düsseldorf Hbf	RE 11 (Rhein-Hellweg-Express)	Kassel-Wilhelmshöhe Terminus
Preceding station	DB Regio NRW	Following station
Warburg towards Hagen Hbf	RE 17	Kassel-Wilhelmshöhe Terminus
Preceding station	Kassel RegioTram	Following station
Hofgeismar-Hümme Terminus	1	Grebenstein towards Kassel Hollandische Straße
Location
- Location within Hesse

Hofgeismar (German: Bahnhof Hofgeismar) is a railway station located in Hofgeismar, Germany. The station is located on the Kassel–Warburg railway. The train services are operated by Deutsche Bahn, abellio Deutschland and RegioTram Gesellschaft.

== Train services ==
The following services currently call at the station:

- Regional services RE 11 RRX Düsseldorf - Hamm - Lippstadt - Paderborn - Warburg - Kassel
- Regional services RE 17 Sauerland-Express Hagen - Bestwig - Brilon Wald - Warburg - Kassel
- Tram-train services RT 1 Hofgeismar-Hümme - Kassel - City Centre - Hollandische Straße
