= Soode =

River in Germany

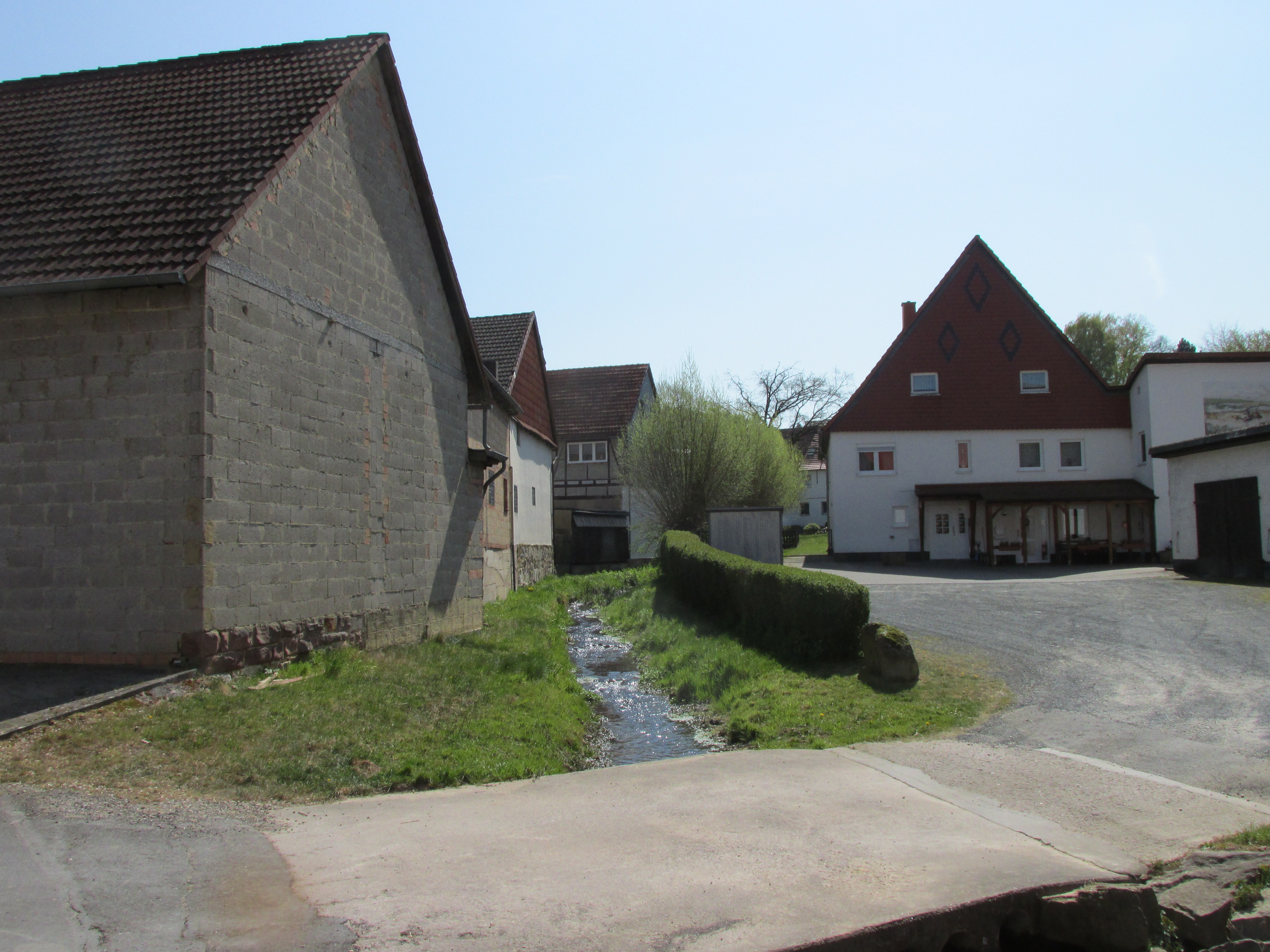

Location
- Country: Germany
- State: Hesse

Physical characteristics
- Mouth
  - location: Lempe
  - coordinates: 51.4945°N 9.4540°E

Basin features
- Progression: Lempe→ Esse→ Diemel→ Weser→ North Sea

Soode is a small river in Hesse, Germany. It flows into the Lempe in Hombressen.

== See also ==
- List of rivers of Hesse
