= Hofgeismar-Hümme station =

Railway station in Hümme, Germany

Hofgeismar-Hümme
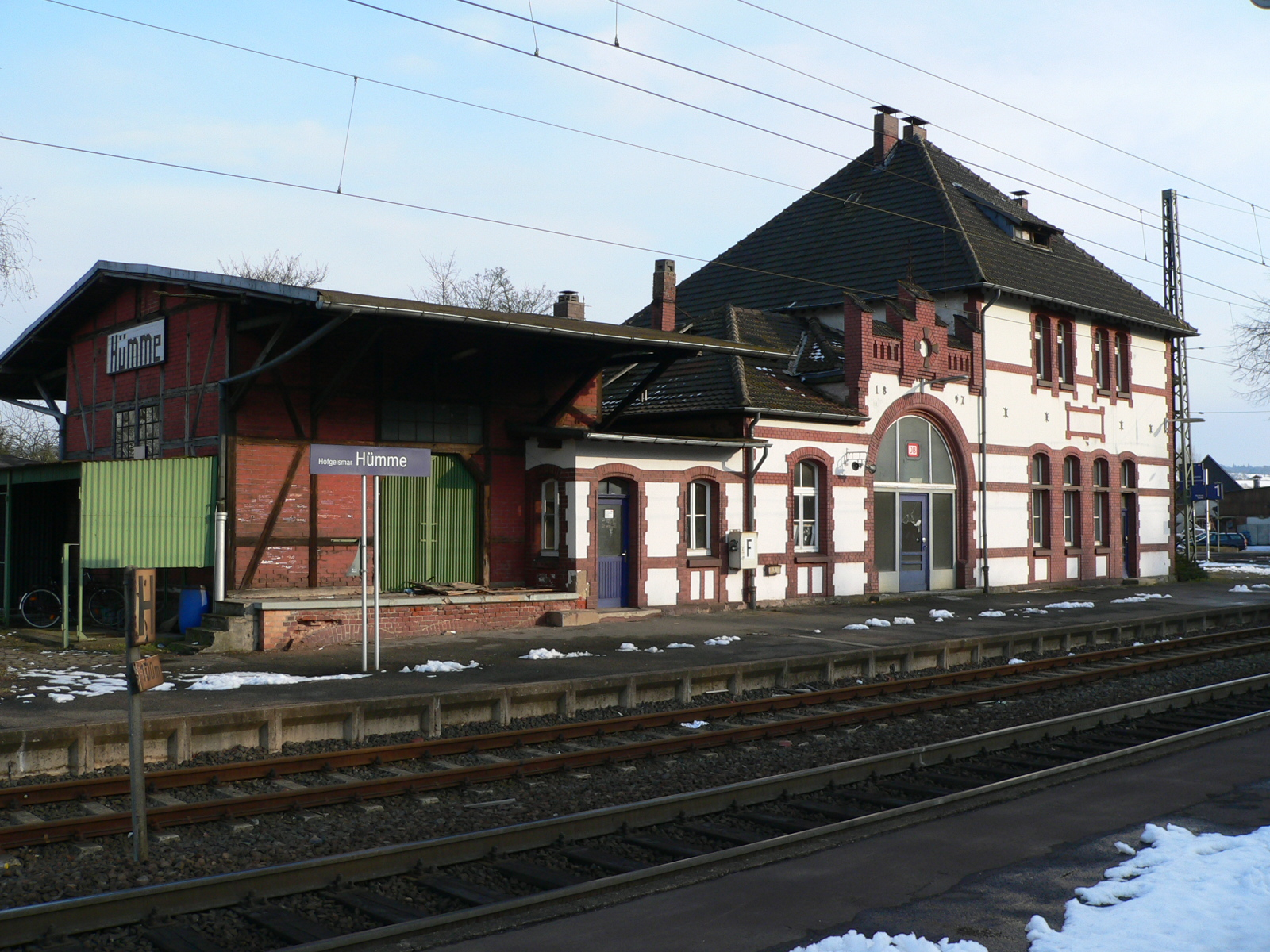
- Hofgeismar-Hümme railway station

General information
- Location: Hümme, Hesse; Germany
- Coordinates: 51.5431°N 9.4021°E
- System: Bf
- Owner: DB Netz
- Operator: DB Station&Service
- Line: Kassel–Warburg railway
- Platforms: 1 island platform 1 side platform
- Tracks: 3

Other information
- Station code: 2945
- DS100 code: FHMM
- IBNR: 8003015
- Category: 5
- Fare zone: NVV: 3131
- Website: www.bahnhof.de

Services
Preceding station	Kassel RegioTram	Following station
Terminus	1	Hofgeismar towards Kassel Hollandische Straße
Location
- Location within Hesse

Hofgeismar-Hümme (German: Bahnhof Hofgeismar-Hümme) is a railway station located in Hümme, Germany. The station is located on the Kassel–Warburg railway. The train services are operated by RegioTram Gesellschaft (RTG).

== Train services ==
The following services currently call at the station:

- Tram-train services RT 1 Hofgeismar-Hümme - Kassel - City Centre - Hollandische Straße
