= Zielke =

Zielke is a German surname. It may refer to:

- Emma Zielke (born 1988), Australian rules footballer
- Gottfried and Thekla Zielke (born 1929 and 1928), German-born ceramicists based in Venezuela
- Martin Zielke (born 1963), German banker
- Roland Zielke (born 1946), German politician
