= Arnsberg (Westfalen) station =

Railway station in Arnsberg, Germany

Arnsberg (Westf)
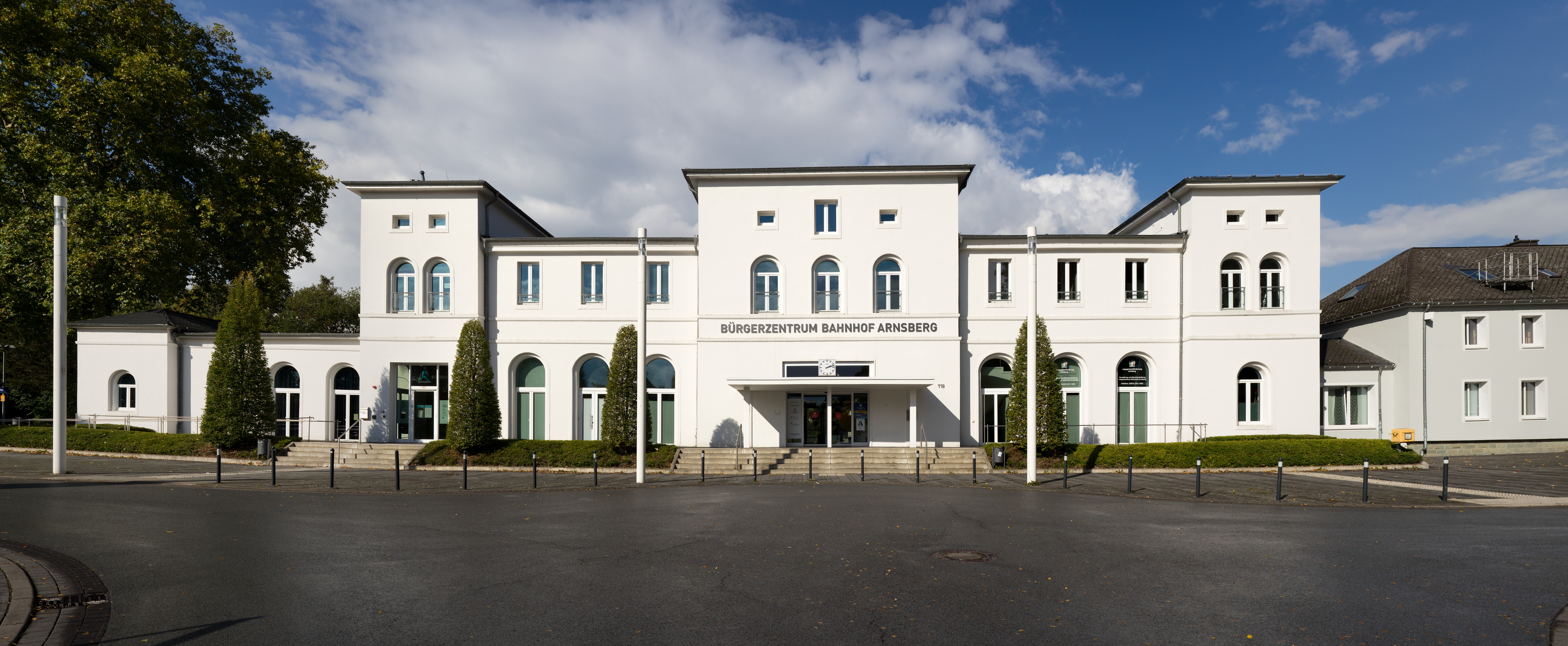

General information
- Location: Zu den Werkstätten 1, Arnsberg, NRW; Germany
- Coordinates: 51°24′19″N 8°04′00″E
- Lines: Upper Ruhr Valley Railway (KBS 435)
- Platforms: 3

Construction
- Accessible: Yes

Other information
- Station code: 177
- DS100 code: EARB
- IBNR: 8000605
- Category: 4
- Fare zone: Westfalentarif: 44261
- Website: www.bahnhof.de

History
- Opened: 1 June 1870

Services
Preceding station	DB Regio NRW	Following station
Neheim-Hüsten towards Hagen Hbf	RE 17	Oeventrop towards Kassel-Wilhelmshöhe
Neheim-Hüsten towards Dortmund Hbf	RE 57	Oeventrop towards Winterberg (Westphalia) or Brilon Stadt
Location

The Arnsberg (Westfalen) station is a station on the Upper Ruhr Valley Railway (German: Obere Ruhrtalbahn) in the German state of North Rhine-Westphalia. It was opened in Arnsberg with the construction of the line in 1870/71. The station building was built in 1869 in the Renaissance Revival style. The station building is still used for passenger traffic. Some of the space in the building is used by various social groups and institutions.

In addition to the existing passenger facilities at Arnsberg station there used to be a major workshop, a depot, a railway telegraph office and a customs office.

== History ==
The construction of the station was preceded by considerable debate between the city and the Bergisch-Märkische Railway Company about its location. Some called for the construction at today's Jäger bridge near the old town. This was rejected by the Company for cost reasons. The station was erected at the exit of the Schlossberg tunnel and below the Lüsenberg (hill). Arnsberg station was at that time far outside the built up area. On 1 May 1908, the station was renamed Arnsberg (Westphalia).

=== Passengers ===
The station consists of a central main building and an attached annex building with two floors and an annex with one floor. The main building was built in the Renaissance Revival style to a design by the architect Rauh of Elberfeld. Hardly anything of the original facade has been preserved. The original plaster surfaces were designed to look like ashlar and the corners were vividly highlighted.

On 12 March 1945, the station badly damaged in an air raid, but then rebuilt.

=== Freight ===
The handling of freight at the station is not subject to restrictions. A crane, a terminal ramp and side ramps and a 40 tonne weighbridge were formerly available for freight traffic. Freight traffic was discontinued in 1976. A few years later, however, a container terminal was built.

=== Main workshop ===
In 1870, the Bergisch-Märkische Railway Company established a main workshop for locomotives and wagons, which became a major employer in the city. In the course of centralisation and rationalisation after the line was taken over by Deutsche Reichsbahn, the main workshop was closed in 1926 or 1927. The maintenance tasks were transferred to Schwerte and Wedau (in Duisburg).

=== Depot ===
The Arnsberg depot was only of regional importance and had a few locomotives, which were composed of Prussian locomotives of classes T 12, G 10 and P 8. In 1941 the depot employed 130 people. In 1953 the depot was disbanded as an independent operation. The works operated for some time as a branch of the Bestwig depot.

== State and development ==
The station building is now listed as a historical monument. It is currently only partially accessible by the disabled. In recent years, the station has been owned by the city of Arnsberg. Various social institutions are located in its wings. The station and station area was fundamentally reconstructed up to August 2011. The station's former joinery workshop has been converted into a new firefighting museum.

The railway engineering facilities are still owned by Deutsche Bahn and were renovated as part of NRW's modernisation initiative 2. The platforms have had barrier-free access since 6 November 2015 and a lift has been installed.

== Services ==
Arnsberg station is served by passenger services on the following lines:

Line	Name	Route
RE 17	Sauerland-Express	Hagen–Fröndenberg–Arnsberg (Westf)–Brilon Wald–Warburg (–Kassel Hbf–Kassel-Wilhelmshöhe)
RE 57	Dortmund-Sauerland-Express	Dortmund–Fröndenberg–Arnsberg (Westf)–Bestwig–Winterberg (Westf)

The RLG and BRS operate the following bus services:

- C 1: Arnsberg, Bahnhof – Neumarkt – Niedereimer – Bruchhausen – Hüsten – Neheim, Busbahnhof
- R 21: Arnsberg, Bahnhof – Neumarkt – Waldfriedhof – Ochsenkopf – Sundern – Sundern-Hagen
- R 22: Arnsberg, Bahnhof – Neumarkt – Wennigloh – Hachen – Langscheid
- R 71: Arnsberg, Bahnhof – Neumarkt – Rumbeck – Oeventrop – Glösingen – Freienohl – Wennemen – Meschede, Busbahnhof
