= Anna Nguyen =

German politician (born 1990)

Member of the Landtag of Hesse
- Incumbent
- Assumed office 18 January 2024

Personal details
- Born: 30 October 1990 (age 35) Hofgeismar
- Party: Alternative for Germany (since 2018)

Anna Nguyen (born 30 October 1990 in Hofgeismar) is a German politician serving as a member of the Landtag of Hesse since 2024. She has been a member of the Alternative for Germany since 2018.
