= Upper Ruhr Valley Railway =

Railway line in Germany

Schwerte–Warburg
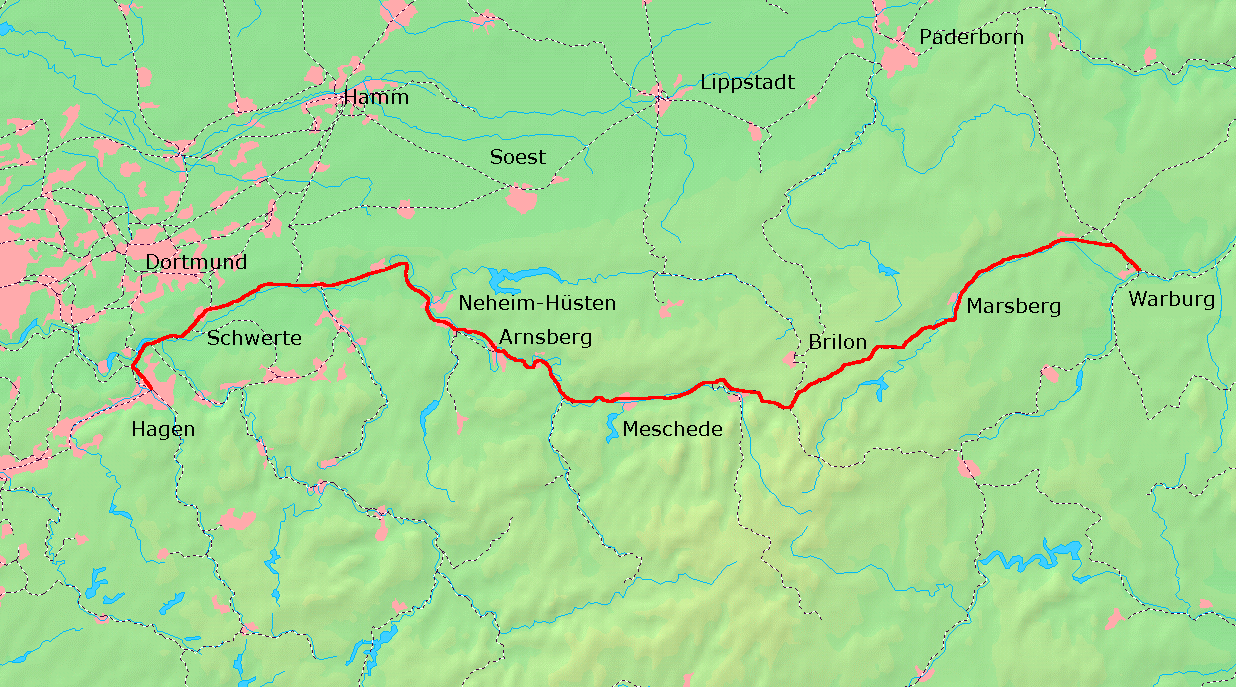

Overview
- Line number: 2550
- Locale: North Rhine-Westphalia, Germany

Service
- Route number: 435

Technical
- Line length: 138 km (86 mi)
- Operating speed: 140 km/h (87.0 mph) 70 (maximum)
- Maximum incline: 0.145%

The Upper Ruhr Valley Railway (German: Obere Ruhrtalbahn) is a 138-kilometre-long, non-electrified line from Schwerte (Ruhr) station) through the Hochsauerland (high Sauerland) to Warburg in the German state of North Rhine-Westphalia. It is the most southerly of the east–west lines that run from the Ruhr to eastern Germany and it connects the rural Hochsauerlandkreis with the Ruhr. The line is included in the German railway timetable as line 435, which continues on the line from Schwerte to Hagen, which is part of the Hagen–Hamm railway.

The Upper Ruhr Valley Railway is named after the Ruhr valley, which it follows between Olsberg and Schwerte. Long-distance services ran on this route until the 1980s but it is now only served by Regional-Express services on the Hagen–Schwerte–Warburg–Kassel) and Dortmund–Fröndenberg–Bestwig (–Winterberg/Willingen) every hour and there are also some extra services in the peak hours and special services.

== History ==
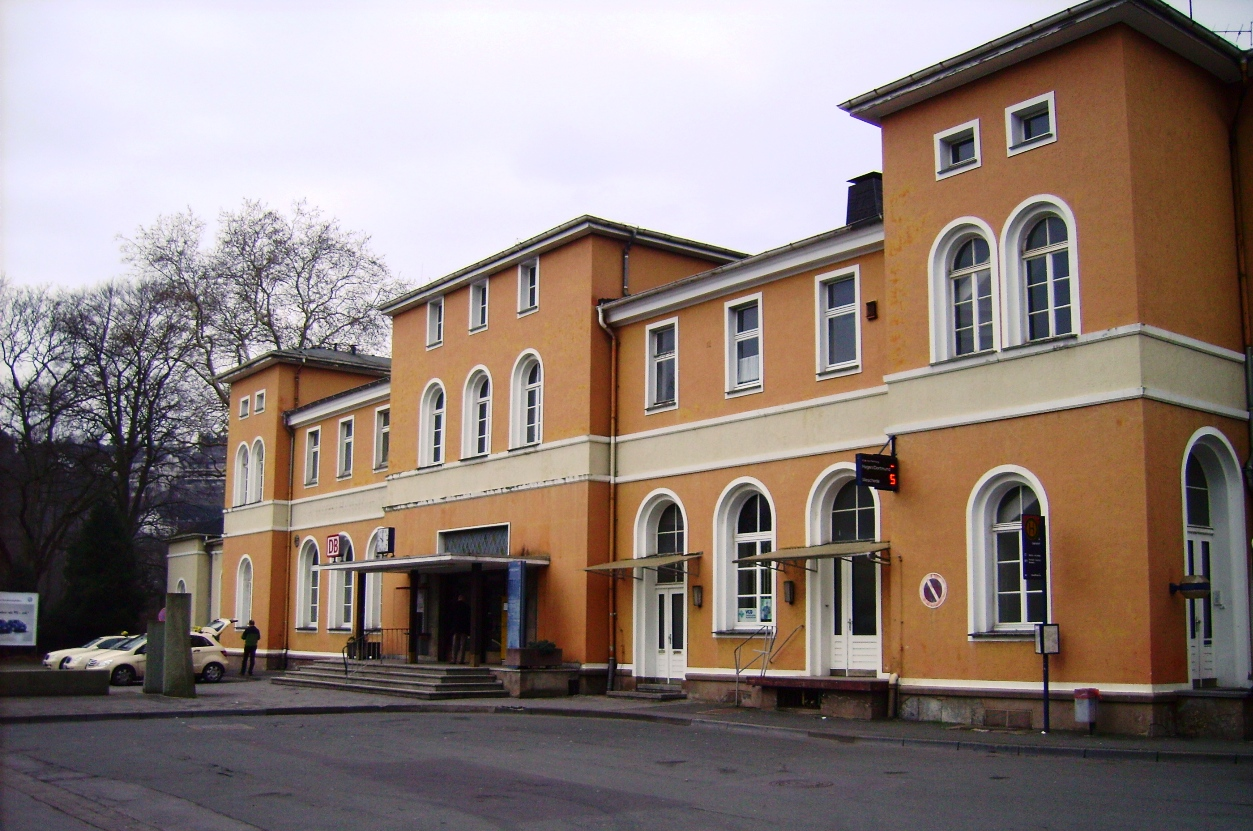
Arnsberg station

In 1856, a committee of representatives of the then districts of Meschede, Brilon, Arnsberg, Soest and Iserlohn and the independent cities of Dortmund and Hamm was established to lobby for the construction of a railway line through the Sauerland. Among others, the Mayor of Werl, Franz Wilhelm Clöer supported the Werl–Arnsberg–Meschede–Warburg route, but the president of the Regierungsbezirk of Arnsberg, Friedrich Wilhelm von Spankeren preferred the Hagen–Warburg route. The General Assembly of the Bergisch-Märkische Railway Company (Bergisch-Märkische Eisenbahn-Gesellschaft, BME) decided at its General Assembly of 30 June 1866 to construct this section, for which it already had a commitment for a licence. This explains how the licence was formally granted as early as 1 October 1866.

The Schwerte–Arnsberg section was opened on 1 June 1870, the Arnsberg–Meschede section was opened on 18 December 1871, the Meschede–Nuttlar section was opened on 1 July 1872. On 6 January 1873, the last section was opened from Nuttlar to Warburg, which had been connected since 1849 to Kassel.

The town of Brilon was not connected to the line (topographical reasons made this impossible), but instead Brilon-Wald station was created about seven kilometres south of it. On 1 July 1900, a connection was opened to the centre of Brilon, from which there were rail connections to Paderborn and Geseke (via Büren) and to Soest and Lippstadt (via Belecke).

During the Second World War the line was busy because it linked the Ruhr with the supply lines far to the east and because the line's cuttings and tunnels made it difficult for low-flying aircraft to find. Traffic was so thin that at times the line was driven on sight. As a result, the route to the east became known as the Mitte-Deutschland-Verbindung (Mid-Germany connection). As traffic to the east fell away after the Second World War, less trains ran on the line.

From autumn 1944 to April 1945 the Upper Ruhr Valley Railway was repeatedly attacked at low altitude by bombers and later by fighter-bombers and fighters. The main target on the line in 1945, the Arnsberg viaduct, was attacked seven times between 9 February and 19 March 1945. On 10 October 1945 by the U.S. Strategic Bombing Survey published a secret report entitled "Railway viaduct at Arnsberg, Germany", which listed 1,818 bombs dropped on the viaduct. On 19 March the viaduct was destroyed in an attack with only 18 bombs. Avro Lancaster bombers dropped six Grand Slam bombs, which at 10 tons were the largest and heaviest type of bomb used in war to date, and 12 Tallboy bombs, weighing 5.4 tons. In addition to the Arnsberg viaduct bridges and then larger stations such as Bestwig, Meschede and Schwerte were subject to massive attacks and destroyed along with the surrounding buildings.

A proposal for rail electrification in the early 1990s omitted the Upper Ruhr Valley Railway because of the immense cost of producing the necessary clearance profile for the overhead line in its many tunnels.

In addition, it was proposed that the line be rebuilt by the end of 2006 for higher speeds using tilting technology, which would have reduced the travel time of the RE 17 service from Hagen to Kassel from three hours to around two and a half hours. This proposal was estimated to cost €31.1 million. The need for the planned works was reviewed in 2010 and the project was shown to have a benefit-cost ratio of less than one. Therefore, the inclusion in the project in the period up to 2015 was rejected in the Federal Transport Infrastructure Plan of 2010. Its realisation in the near future is unlikely.

== Route ==
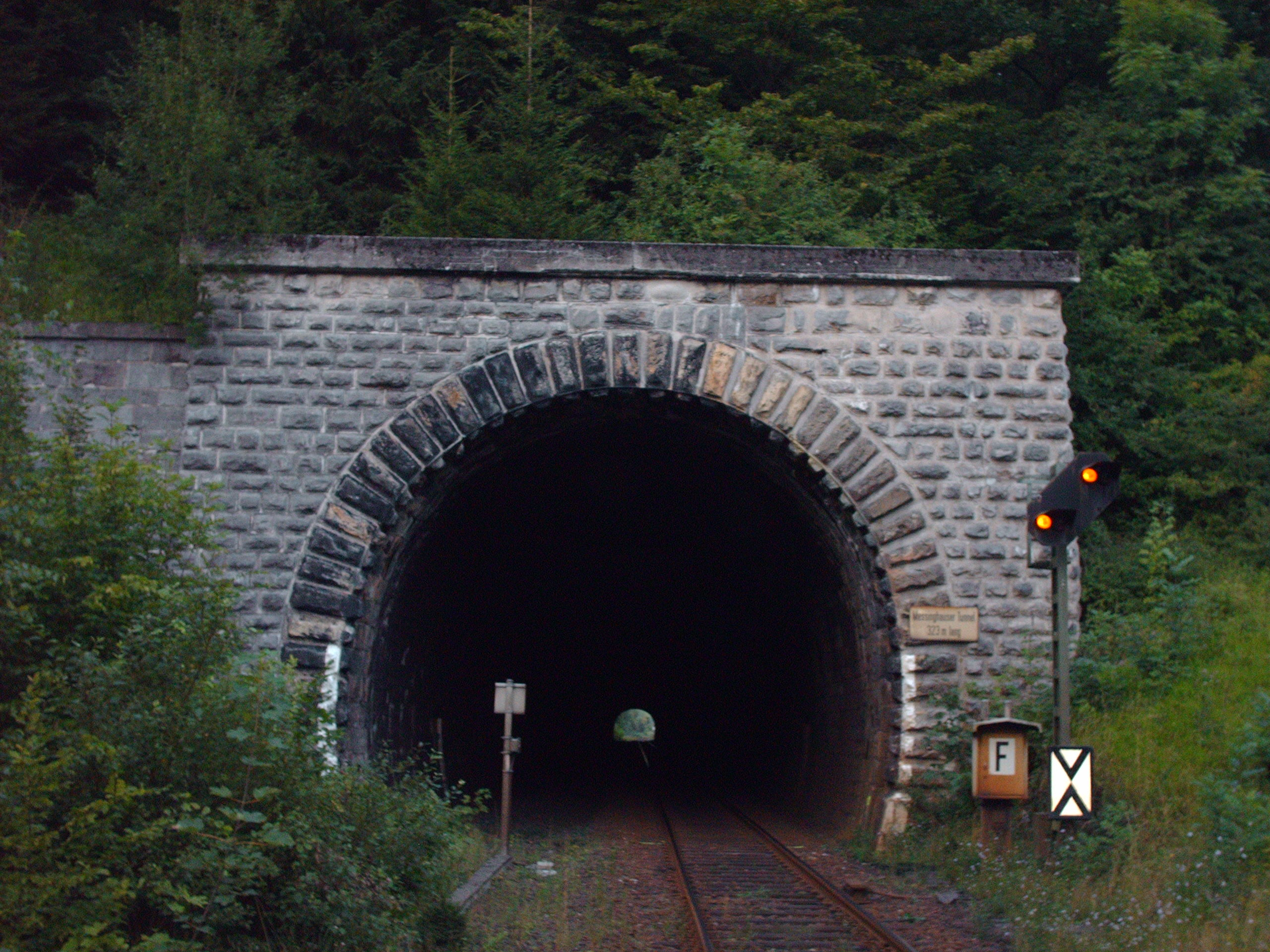
Western portal of the Messinghausen Tunnel

The Upper Ruhr Valley Railway begins in Schwerte and ends in Warburg. The line between Hagen and Schwerte is part of the Hagen–Hamm line and is used by trains on both lines 455 and 435 in the German railway timetable. The latter is operated by Deutsche Bahn as the Upper Ruhr Valley Railway.

The line runs from Hagen to Olsberg along the Ruhr, which also gives the line its name. The line from Hagen via Schwerte to Hamm is electrified and double track, additional parallel tracks between Hagen and Schwerte belong to the Ruhr–Sieg railway and to the freight line from Hagen to Hagen-Vorhalle.

The Upper Ruhr Valley Railway branches from the Hagen–Hamm line in Schwerte station and in Schwerte Ost station it is joined by a connecting curve, which is used by the RE 57 service from Dortmund. The line is double track, winding and relatively steep to Bestwig. This was the location of Bestwig depot, which is still used for train parking, refuelling and cleaning. In Bestwig the climb begins to Brilon Wald, the high point of the line. Over a length of 14 kilometres, the line climbs about 155 metres. In Elleringhausen tunnel at Olsberg it crosses the watershed between the Rhine and Weser. The line then runs through the Hoppecke valley and later through the Diemel valley. After Bredelar the line falls about 165 metres over a length of around 18 kilometres. The section to Warburg has no more significant grades. The Brilon Wald–Warburg section is now only a single track with crossing loops in Messinghausen, Marsberg and Scherfede.

=== Line speeds ===
Speed limits on each section are as follows:

- Schwerte–Wickede: 140 km/h
- Wickede–Arnsberg: 120 km/h
- Arnsberg–Meschede: 100 km/h
- Meschede–Bestwig: 120 km/h
- Bestwig–Brilon Wald: 90 km/h
- Brilon Wald–Warburg: 120 km/h

=== Interlockings ===
Listed here are the only interlockings that are regularly staffed.

- Hagen, electronic interlocking El S, remote control Westhofen/Schwerte
- Fröndenberg, relay interlocking Dr Sp S60, remote control Schwerte Ost/Langschede/Wickede
- Neheim-Husten, relay interlocking Sp Dr S600, remote control Arnsberg/Freienohl/Wennemen/Meschede
- Bestwig, relay interlocking Dr Sp S60, remote control Eversberg
- Brilon Wald, relay interlocking Dr S2, remote control Marsberg/Messinghausen
- Scherfede, mechanical interlocking
- Warburg, relay interlocking Dr Sp S60

The electronic interlocking in Hagen opened in 1995 was one of the first electronic interlocking systems of DB and used in the first stage Hp-Kompakt signals (the compact version of the colour light signal system developed in Germany in the 20th century) instead of the usual system now used for electronic interlocking, the Ks-Signalsystem.

=== Speed restrictions ===
On the line there are in normal operation, there is currently one permanent speed restriction at a level crossing between Brilon Wald and Hoppecke (20 km/h).

== Operations ==
=== Long-distance services ===
The Schwerte–Warburg section is no longer served by long-distance trains. There used to be a D-Zug express train on the Amsterdam–Bad Wildungen route, using the line, and express trains to Kassel, Leipzig and Berlin. In 1941 a holiday express train ran on the Brest-Litovsk–Bebra–Arnsberg–Aachen–Brussels–Ostend route. An express train ran until 1991 from Amsterdam to Korbach; it reversed in Brilon Wald and ran on the Upland Railway (Uplandbahn) to Korbach, with through coaches continuing on the Edersee Railway (Ederseebahn) to Bad Wildungen. In the 1990s, trains ran from Duisburg and Cologne to Willingen and Korbach on autumn weekends. The last pair of express trains were D 2641 and D 2640, which ran once a week between Düsseldorf and Willingen until December 2003. Long-distance trains coming from the west had to change to diesel traction at Hagen station as the line is not electrified.

=== Regional services ===
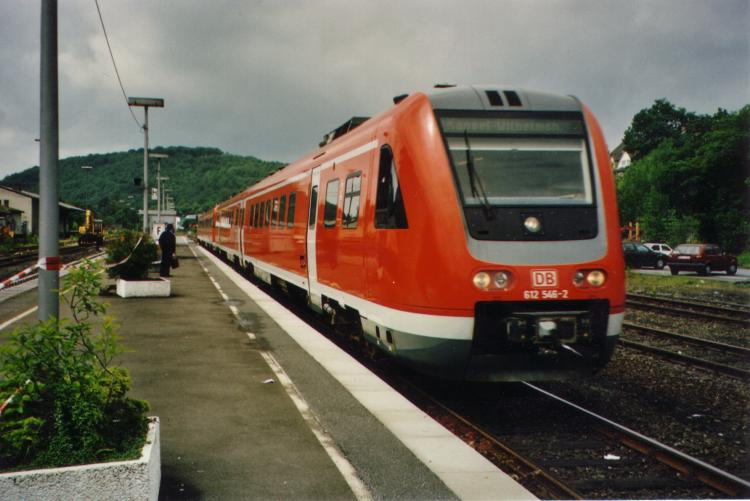
RE 17 in Meschede station

The non-electrified line was for a long time served with diesel hauled regional trains. In 2002, the regular use of locomotives ended and the trains have since been operated with multiple units. These regional services connect the Higher Sauerland District with the urban centres of the Ruhr area. In addition, the Upper Ruhr Valley Railway gives access via branch lines to accommodate excursions to mountain resorts in the winter.

The Upper Ruhr Valley Railway between Hagen and Warburg is now served every hour by the RE 17 (Sauerland-Express) service. Every two hours these trains continue to/from Kassel-Wilhelmshöhe. In Hesse, the Sauerland-Express is however numbered as the RE 3.

The Fröndenberg–Bestwig section is also supplemented with an hourly service of the RE 57 (the Dortmund-Sauerland-Express), continuing to Winterberg. As a result, the Fröndenberg–Bestwig section is served at 30-minute intervals on weekdays. The line is operated with RegioSwinger (class 612) sets between Schwerte and Wickede at 140 km/h, continuing through Warburg to Kassel at a maximum speed of 140 km/h.

Earlier the RE 17 was operated with Class 218 locomotives hauling three to six Silberling carriages together with class 624 diesel multiple units and later with class 628 DMUs. Today the services to and from Kassel are operated with class 612 sets and the services that turn back at Warburg with class 628.4 sets. The RE 57 in the first years of its service operated on the Meschede–Schwerte section. It was then extended from Schwerte to Dortmund and joined to the Bestwig–Winterberg Regionalbahn service. Originally it was operated with class 624 and 628 sets. After a European-wide tender as part of the Sauerland network, DB Regio NRW was chosen to operate the service almost exclusively with class 648.1 (Alstom Coradia LINT 41) sets since the summer of 2008; it is partly operated during the weekend with mixed sets including rebuilt 640 (LINT 27) sets.

The so-called Säuferzüge ("boozer trains"), which are particularly popular with bowling clubs, are operated on the Hagen–Willingen route using triple class 648.1 sets and on the Dortmund–Willingen route with class 628.4 sets. On Fridays a section of RE 57 services that end every two hours in Bestwig continues to Willingen.

Line	Service	Route	Vehicles used	Frequency
RE 17	Sauerland-Express	Hagen – Schwerte – Bestwig – Warburg	612 (RE 39xx) and 628 (RE 292xx)	60 or 120 min
RE 57	Dortmund-Sauerland-Express	Dortmund – Schwerte – Bestwig – Winterberg	648 (RE 295xx), Fri. an extra 2×612	60 min

The line also used by many special trips with steam trains and rail buses.

=== Sauerland-Express ===
The Sauerland-Express is a Regional-Express services that runs from Hagen to Kassel-Wilhelmshöhe and is funded by the Verkehrsverbund Rhein-Ruhr (Rhine-Ruhr Transport Association, VRR), Verkehrsgemeinschaft Ruhr-Lippe (Ruhr-Lippe Transport Company, VRL), Nahverkehrsverbund Paderborn-Höxter (Paderborn-Höxter Local Transport Association, nph) and Nordhessischer Verkehrsverbund (North Hessian Transport Association, NVV). It is operated by DB Regio NRW with class 612 and 628.4 sets and is popular with tourists and users of the Schönen-Wochenende ("beautiful weekend") tickets.

==== Fares ====
On the section from Hagen to Schwerte VRR fares apply. From Schwerte to Westheim VRL fares apply, from there to Warburg nph fares apply and finally the Warburg-Kassel section NPT fares apply.

==== Connections ====
Station	Connecting from/to	Line
Hagen	Bochum, Dortmund, Düsseldorf, Essen, Hamm, Iserlohn, Cologne, Lüdenscheid, Siegen, Solingen, Wuppertal	RE 4, RE 7, RE 13, RE 16, RB 40, RB 52, S 8, S 5, IC, ICE
Schwerte (Ruhr)	Dortmund, Düsseldorf, Hamm, Iserlohn, Cologne, Münster, Solingen, Wuppertal	RE 7, RE 13, RB 53
Fröndenberg	Menden, Neuenrade, Unna	RB 54
Bestwig	Winterberg	RE 57
Brilon Wald	Korbach, Willingen, Brilon Stadt (since Dec. 2011)	RB 55
Warburg	Dresden, Hofgeismar, Münster, Ostseebad Binz	RT 3, RB 89, IC, ICE
Kassel Hbf (as NVV RE 3)	Frankfurt, Fulda, Göttingen, Gießen, Halle(Saale), Korbach, Marburg, Treysa	RE 1, RE 30, R 1, R 5, R 39, RT 3, RT 4, RT 5, RT 9
Kassel-Wilhelmshöhe (as NVV RE 3)	Berlin, Frankfurt, Fulda, Gießen, Halle (Saale), Hamburg, Korbach, Marburg, München, Treysa, Stuttgart	RE 1, RE 4, RE 30, R 5, R 39, RT 5, RT 9, IC, ICE (regional and long distance)

=== Dortmund-Sauerland-Express ===
==== Fares ====
On the section from Dortmund to Schwerte (which is not served) the fares of the VRR apply. VRL fares apply from Schwerte to Winterberg.

==== Connections ====
Station	Connecting from/to	Line
Dortmund	Düsseldorf, Cologne, Münster, Iserlohn, Gelsenkirchen, Lüdenscheid, Dortmund, Hamm, Minden, Enschede, Dorsten	RE 1, RE 3, RE 4, RE 6, RE 11, RB 43, RB 50, RB 51, RB 52, RB 53, RB 59, S 1, S 2, S 5, IC, ICE, NZ
Dortmund-Hörde	Soest	RB 59
Fröndenberg	Menden, Neuenrade, Unna	RB 54
Bestwig	Warburg, Kassel	RE 17

=== Freight ===
The operation of freight on the Upper Ruhr Valley Railway long acted as an extension of the Mid-Germany Connection. This meant that the industry of the Ruhr was connected with supply points to the east. This east–west traffic increasingly fell away after the Second World War and it was used almost entirely for local freight traffic. Today, scheduled freight traffic is hauled by class 294 locomotives. In the early morning hours, two trains operate along the Ruhr valley.
