= Hagen–Hamm railway =

Railway line in Germany

Overview
- Line number: 2550 (Hagen–Schwerte); 2840 (Schwerte–Holzwickede); 2103 (Holzwickede–Unna); 2932 (Unna–Hamm)
- Locale: North Rhine-Westphalia, Germany

Service
- Route number: 455

Technical
- Line length: 48 km (30 mi)
- Number of tracks: 2 (throughout)
- Track gauge: 1,435 mm (4 ft 8 1/2 in) standard gauge
- Operating speed: 160 km/h (99.4 mph) (maximum)

The Hagen–Hamm railway is a continuous two-track, electrified main line in the German state of North Rhine-Westphalia, connecting Hagen via Schwerte, Holzwickede and Unna to Hamm.

== History ==
The railway line from Hagen to Hamm was built by the Bergisch-Märkische Railway Company (German: Bergisch-Märkische Eisenbahn-Gesellschaft, BME) to link its existing Elberfeld–Dortmund and Dortmund–Soest lines as well as Hamm station.

The section between Holzwickede and Unna was opened by the BME on 9 July 1855 as part of its Dortmund–Soest line. Ten years later, on 18 January 1866, the section from Unna to Hamm was made available for passenger traffic, while the section from Hagen to Holzwickede opened a year later on 1 April 1867.

== Current situation ==
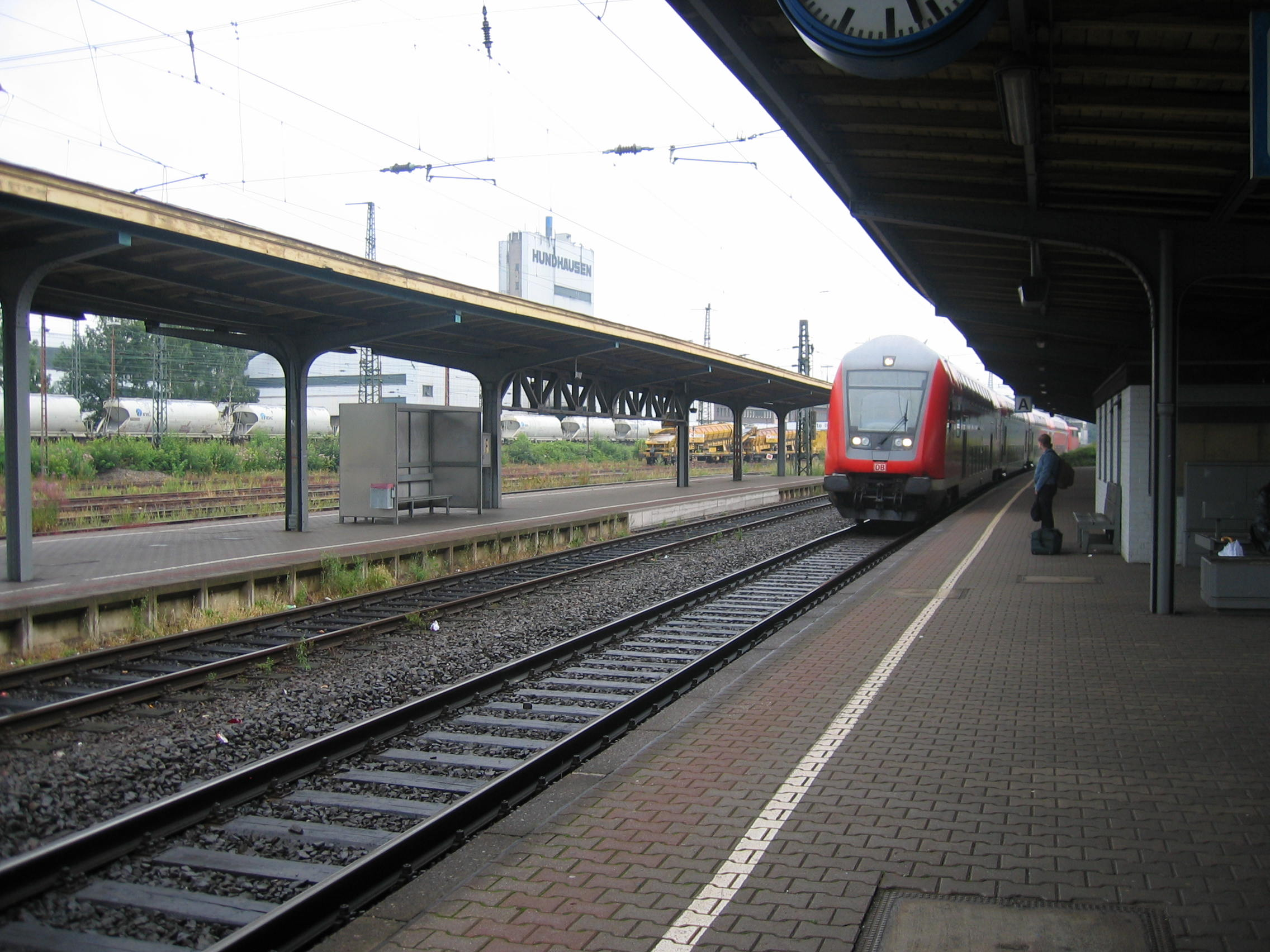
Schwerte station

The whole length of the line is served hourly by Regional-Express services on lines RE 7, the Rhein-Münsterland-Express (Rheine–Krefeld), and RE 13, the Maas-Wupper-Express (Hamm–Venlo). The section between Hagen and Schwerte is also served by RE 17, the Sauerland-Express (Hagen–Warburg), every hour. The section between Holzwickede and Unna is also served by Regionalbahn service RB 59, Hellweg-Bahn.

Long distance Intercity-Express and InterCity trains operate on the line between Cologne and Hamm (continuing to Berlin) stopping only at Hagen and Hamm.
