= Lempe =

River in Germany

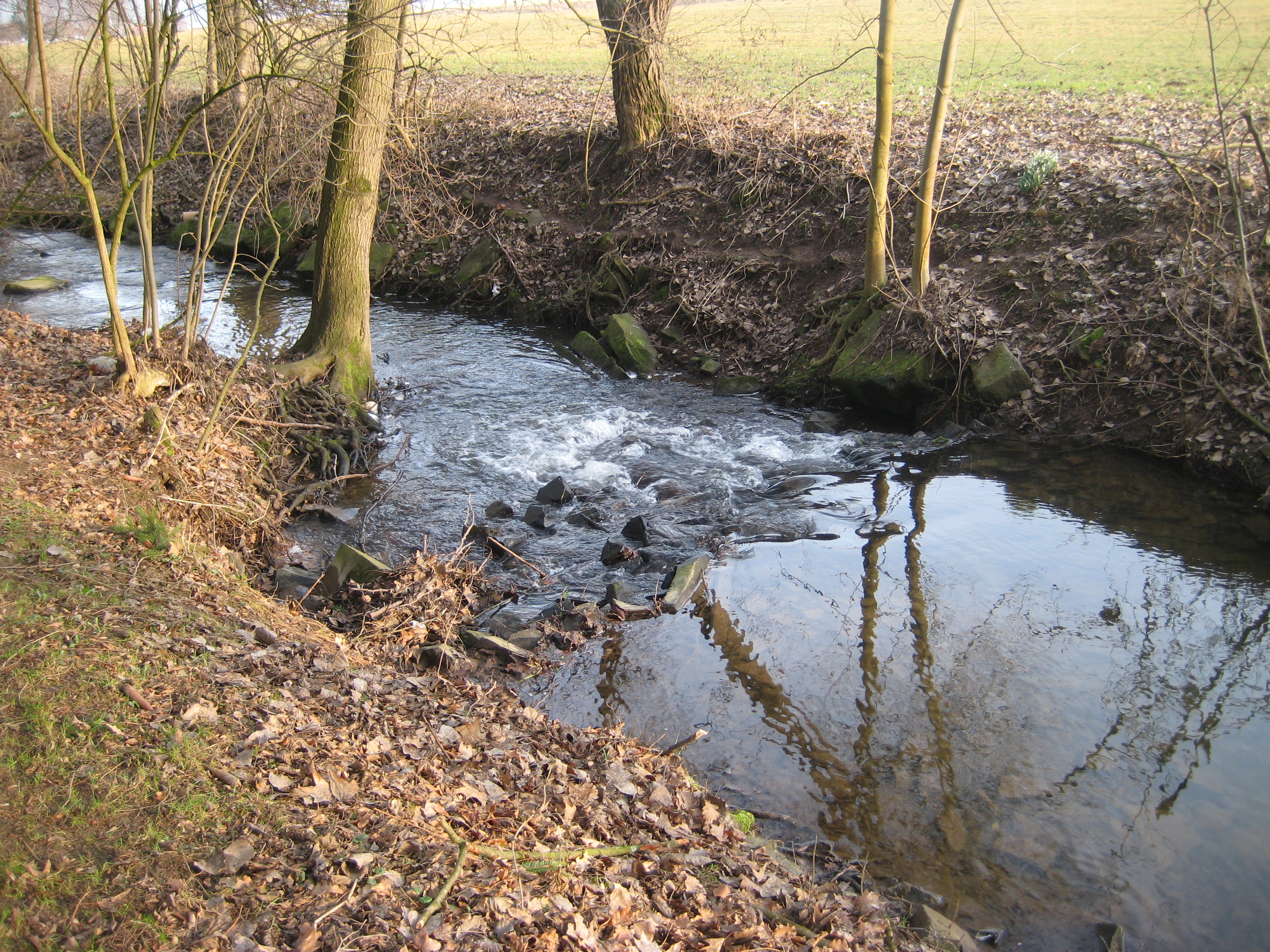

Location
- Country: Germany
- State: Hesse

Physical characteristics
- Mouth
  - location: Esse
  - coordinates: 51.5064°N 9.3984°E
- Length: 16.3 km (10.1 mi)

Basin features
- Progression: Esse→ Diemel→ Weser→ North Sea

The Lempe is a river of Hesse, Germany. The 16.3 km long Lempe is a southeastern and orographically right tributary of the Esse, into which it flows in Hofgeismar.

== See also ==
- List of rivers of Hesse
