= Kassel–Warburg railway =

Railway line in Germany

Overview
- Line number: 2550
- Locale: North Rhine-Westphalia and Hesse, Germany
- Termini: Warburg (Westf); Kassel Hbf

Service
- Route number: 430

Technical
- Line length: 52.3 km (32.5 mi)
- Number of tracks: 2
- Track gauge: 1,435 mm (4 ft 8 1/2 in) standard gauge
- Electrification: 15 kV/16.7 Hz AC overhead catenary
- Operating speed: 140 km/h (87.0 mph) (maximum)

The Kassel–Warburg Railway is a line that connects Kassel in the north of the German state of Hesse with Warburg in eastern Westphalia. The line was opened in 1848 and is one of the oldest railways in Germany.

It forms part of the Mid-Germany Railway (German: Mitte-Deutschland-Verbindung), an east–west through line in central Germany, used by long-distance and regional passenger and freight trains.

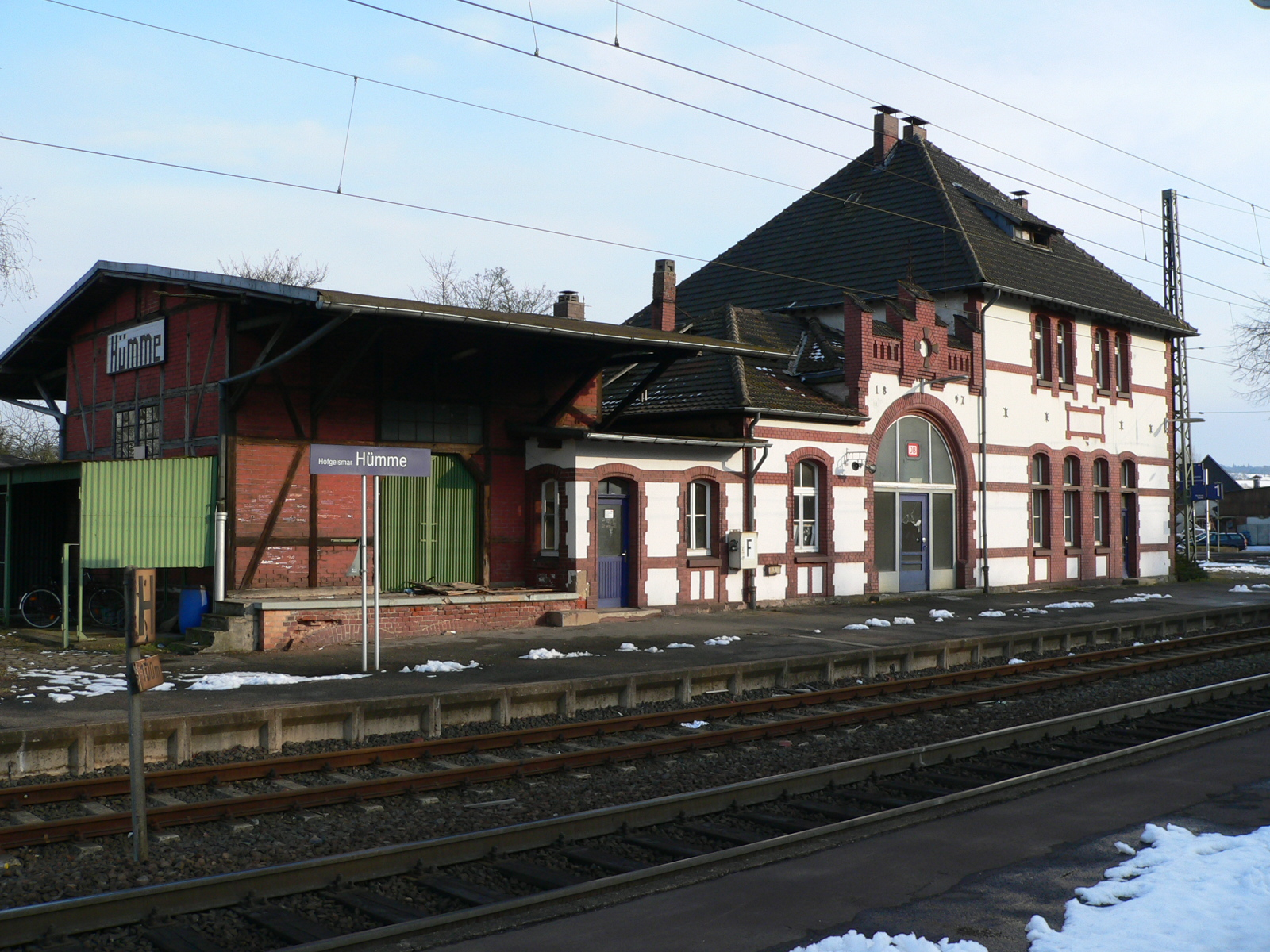
Hofgeismar-Hümme station

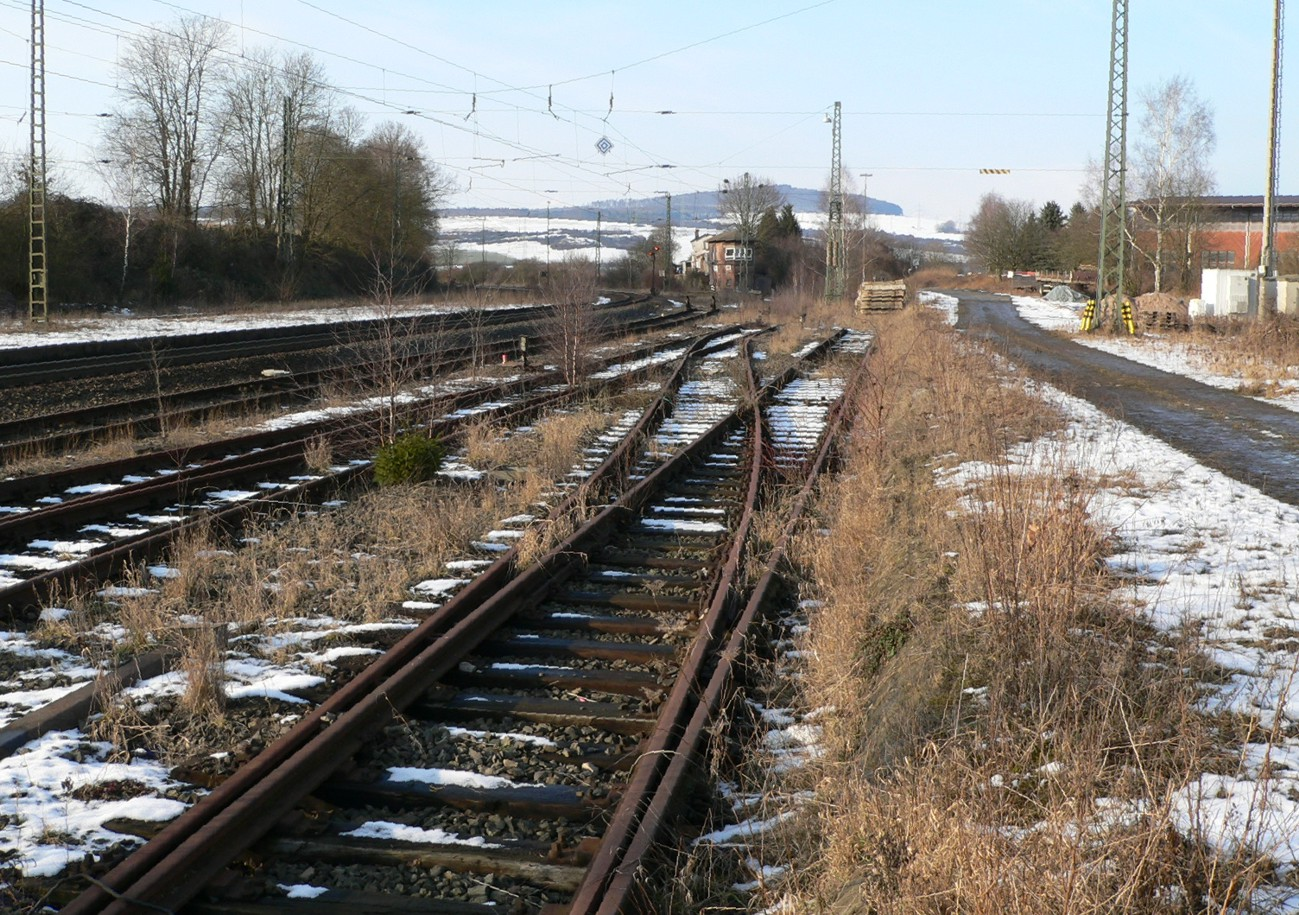
Former Carl Railway junction

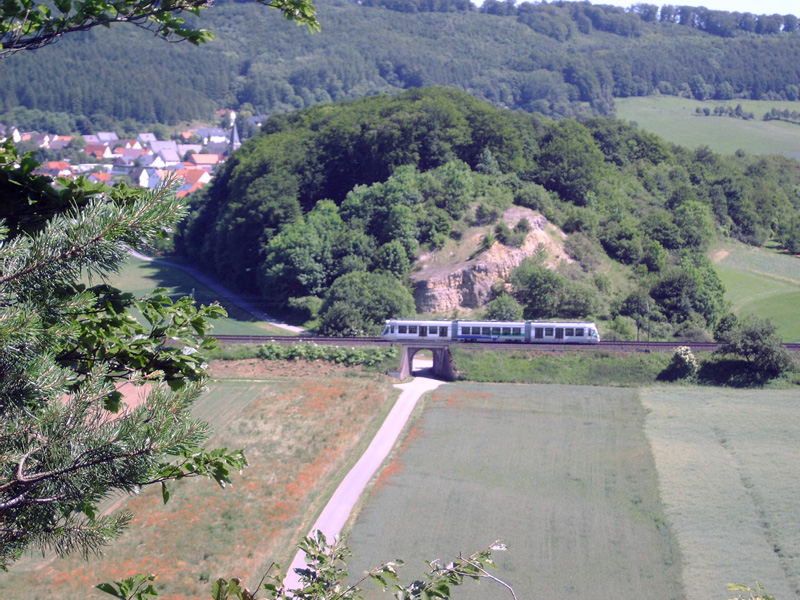
RegioTram near Liebenau between Hofgeismar-Hümme and Warburg

== History ==
The track was originally built by the Frederick William Northern Railway (Friedrich-Wilhelms-Nordbahn-Gesellschaft, FWNG) as the Carl Railway (or Charles Railway, German: Carl Bahn) from Kassel, the capital of the Electorate of Hesse (Kurhessen), to the port of Bad Karlshafen (then called Carlshaven, German for "Port Charles", after Charles I, Hesse’s ruler from 1670 to 1730) on the left bank of the Weser, one of the northernmost places in the contiguous part of Kurhessen.

The first section from Grebenstein via Hümme to Karlshafen on the south bank of the Wesser was completed on 30 March 1848. A few months later, on 29 August 1848, the remainder of the line was completed between Kassel and Grebenstein.

Soon after the completion of the line, rail transport became important for connecting with sea transport, so the Frederick William Northern Railway started building a new line from Hofgeismar-Hümme station towards Warburg in Westphalia, under an agreement between Kurhessen and Prussia. The small border town of Haueda was reached on 6 March 1849. Since the track in Westphalia was originally the responsibility of the Cologne-Minden-Thuringian Connecting Railway Company (Köln-Minden-Thüringische-Verbindungs-Eisenbahn-Gesellschaft), which in the meantime became bankrupt, it was not until 6 February 1851, that the Royal Westphalian Railway Company (Königlich-Westfälische Eisenbahn-Gesellschaft) completed the section of its Hamm–Warburg line between Warburg and the border.

== Route ==
The route is classified as a main line railway and has two tracks for its whole length. Electrification of the line was completed on 11 December 1970. It is classified as track class D4, which allows axle loads of 22.5 t and a linear load of 8.0 t/m. The entire route is equipped with the Punktförmige Zugbeeinflussung (PZB 90) train control system and the Geschwindigkeitsüberwachung Neigetechnik (GNT) speed monitoring system for Tilting trains (ZUB 262).

== Operations ==
Long distance passenger transport is proved by five pairs of InterCity trains, approximately every two hours:

IC 51	(Binz – Stralsund –) Berlin – Halle – Naumburg – Erfurt – Eisenach – Kassel-Wilhelmshöhe – Warburg – Paderborn – Dortmund – Essen – Duisburg – Düsseldorf (– Cologne)

Regional transport on the line is provided by the following Regional-Express and Regionalbahn Lines, and is served by tram-train services of RegioTram Kassel:

Line	Route	Operator	Rollingstock	Frequency
RT1	Kassel Hbf – Vellmar-Obervellmar – Hofgeismar-Hümme (– Warburg) (nur HVZ)	RegioTram Kassel		30 min
RT4	Kassel Hbf – Vellmar-Obervellmar – Zierenberg – Wolfhagen	RegioTram Kassel		30 min
RE 17 Sauerland-Express	Kassel – Warburg – Bestwig – Schwerte – Hagen	DB Regio NRW	2x BR 612 (160 km/h)	120 min
