= Martin Zielke =

German bank manager (born 1963)

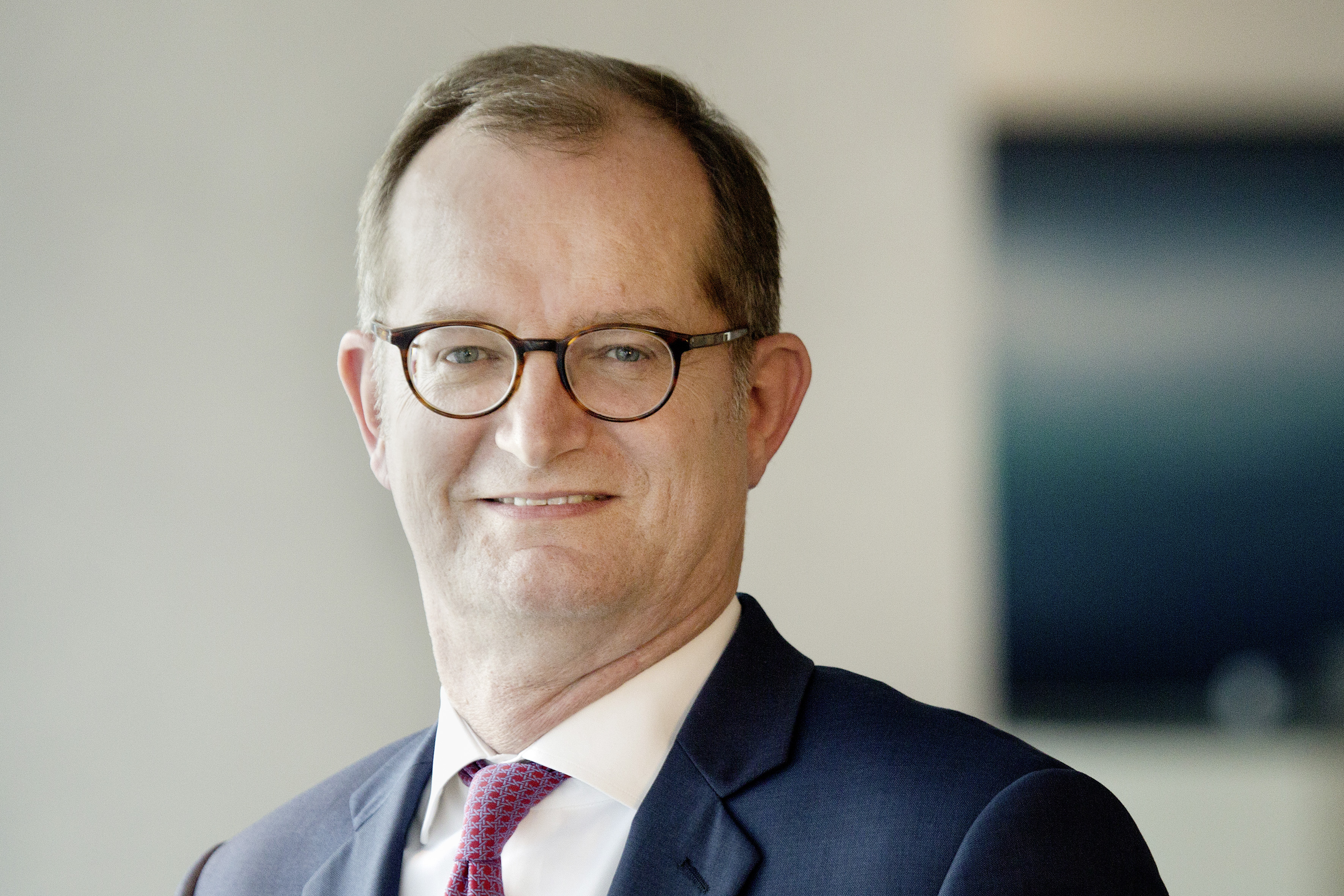
- Martin Zielke (2015)
- Born: January 17, 1963 (age 63); Hofgeismar, Hesse, Germany
- Education: Georg August University
- Occupation: Banker
- Employer: Commerzbank
- Title: Chairman of the Board of Managing Directors

Martin Zielke (born 17 January 1963 in Hofgeismar, Hesse, Germany) is a German bank manager who was chief executive officer and chairman of the board of managing directors of Commerzbank from 2016 until 2020.

== Early life and education ==
After training as a banker from 1983 to 1985, Zielke attended the Georg August University in Göttingen from 1985 to 1990 and graduated with a degree in business administration.

== Career ==
After graduating, Zielke worked for Dresdner Bank’s and Deutsche Bank’s private banking and asset management.

In 2002, Zielke joined Commerzbank as divisional board member. During his early years there, he held management roles in retail and corporate banking. From 2006 to 2008, Zielke has been chief financial officer and member of the board of managing directors of Eurohypo, which had been acquired by Commerzbank a few months before. In early 2008, he became head of group finance at Commerzbank. Finally, in 2010, Zielke was appointed to the board of managing directors of Commerzbank, being responsible for the private customers segment.

After having been appointed as Martin Blessing’s successor, Zielke took on the position of chief executive officer of Commerzbank on May 1, 2016. He focused on core businesses and digitalization. Although he had a contract until November 2023, he eventually resigned after disagreements with the bank's second-biggest shareholder, Cerberus Capital Management, in July 2020.

== Other activities ==
- Association of German Banks, Member of the Board of Directors
- Baden-Badener Unternehmer-Gespräche (BBUG), Member of the Board (since 2016)
- Institute of International Finance (IIF), Member of the Board
- University of Göttingen, Faculty of Business and Economics, Member of the advisory board (since 2019)
- Working Group of Protestant Businesses (AEU), Member of the Board of Trustees
