= Gottfried and Thekla Zielke =

Gottfried and Thekla Zielke (born 1929 and 1928 in Germany) are ceramicists based in Venezuela. Later married, the Zielkes met at Technical school in Germany and started a personal and professional collaboration. After graduating college, Thekla designed pottery for two years at a German factory, before immigrating to Sweden, where she apprenticed for three years in a ceramics workshop. While Thekla studied ceramics design, Gottfried learned the technical aspects of the craft, with an emphasis on enamel. After attaining his bachelor's degree, Gottfried apprenticed for three years in two ceramics workshops, where he gained further knowledge of ceramics technique, theory, and chemistry. This led to later scientific studies of the medium, such as organic chemistry, mineralogy, and geology.

After being hired to open Azulejos Corona, a tile factory in Bogotá in 1952, Gottfried relocated to Colombia and was asked three years later to open another factory for the Vencerámica company in La Victoria, Venezuela. After Gottfried and Thekla were married in Italy in 1955, she too moved to Venezuela. Unhappy with managing the factory, the couple established a quieter life in Colonia Tovar (an isolated mountain village founded in the nineteenth century near Caracas by Bavarian immigrants). They constructed a modest house on a friend’s land with the intention of establishing a small ceramics studio, where they completed their first pieces in 1959. Thekla used a wheel to form the clay, while Gottfried spearheaded the technical aspects of production, such as clay selection, glazes, and firing lengths and temperatures. The remote village, without a road to draw visitors, left them free to experiment with artistic forms. They won the National Prize for Applied Arts at the 1961 Salón Oficial Annual de Arte Venezolano (Official Annual Venezuelan Art Salon), which brought attention to their practice. After a road was completed from Caracas to Colonia Tovar in 1967, the couple began to produce utilitarian objects to sell to tourists. Increased production led them to implement a partially mechanized process. Also in 1967, they won an award at the Salón Arturo Michelena and were invited to become members of the World Craft Council, which led to more awards and recognition. In Colonia Tovar, the Zielkes partnered with other craftspeople to form a trade school for the town’s youth, so they could learn skills, such as ceramics, forging, and blacksmithing. Their project evolved into a thriving school for woodworking and the manufacture of musical instruments.

== Exhibitions ==
- Moderno: Design for Living in Brazil, Mexico, and Venezuela, 1940–1978 , Americas Society (New York), 2015.
