= Warburg station =

Railway station in Warburg, Germany

Warburg (Westf)
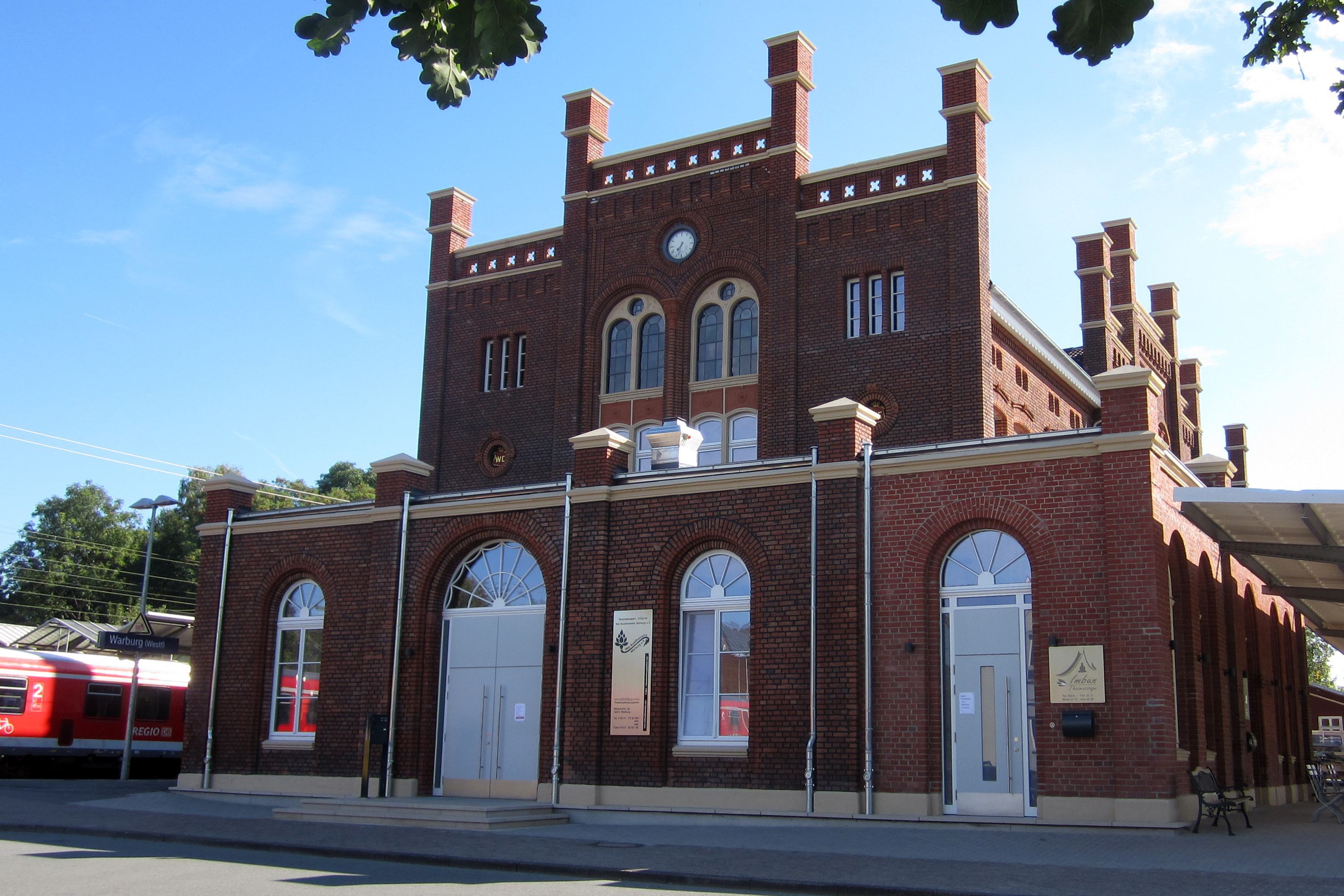

General information
- Location: Bahnhofstraße 82, Warburg, North Rhine-Westphalia; Germany
- Coordinates: 51°29′34″N 9°9′49″E
- Lines: Hamm–Warburg (KBS 430); Kassel–Warburg (KBS 610); Upper Ruhr Valley Railway (KBS 435)
- Platforms: 3

Construction
- Accessible: Yes
- Architect: Julius Eugen Ruhl

Other information
- Station code: 6537
- DS100 code: HWAR
- IBNR: 8000196
- Category: 3
- Fare zone: NVV: 8010; Westfalentarif: 77961
- Website: www.bahnhof.de

History
- Opened: 6 February 1851

Services
Preceding station	DB Fernverkehr	Following station
Altenbeken towards Köln Hbf	IC 51	Kassel-Wilhelmshöhe towards Gera Hbf
Preceding station	National Express Germany	Following station
Willebadessen towards Düsseldorf Hbf	RE 11 (Rhein-Hellweg-Express)	Hofgeismar towards Kassel-Wilhelmshöhe
Preceding station	DB Regio NRW	Following station
Scherfede towards Hagen Hbf	RE 17	Hofgeismar towards Kassel-Wilhelmshöhe
Preceding station		Following station
Willebadessen towards Münster Hbf	RB 89	Terminus
Location

The Warburg station (German: Bahnhof Warburg (Westfalen) or Bf Warburg (Westf)) is located on the north-eastern edge of the German town of Warburg.

The station was built in 1852 and 1853. Warburg and Minden stations are the last stations from the early railway history of the Prussian province of Westphalia that are still in their original form as island stations (Inselbahnhöfen), with the station entrance buildings located between the tracks.

== Location ==
The station is located at Warburg on the double track and electrified Hamm–Warburg line to Hamm, the Frederick William Northern Railway to Kassel and the non-electrified Upper Ruhr Valley Railway to Hagen.

The former line to Volkmarsen, part of the Warburg–Sarnau line, was closed in 1977 and dismantled in 1983.

== Operations ==
Regional trains stopping in Warburg are: Regional-Express trains to Düsseldorf (RE 11: Rhein-Hellweg-Express) and to Hagen (RE 17: Sauerland-Express) and Regionalbahn trains via Paderborn to Münster (RB 89: Ems-Börde-Bahn).

Line	Line name	Route	Frequency
RE 11	Rhein-Hellweg-Express	Düsseldorf – Düsseldorf Airport – Duisburg – Essen – Dortmund – Hamm (Westf) – Paderborn – Warburg – Kassel-Wilhelmshöhe	120 min
RE 17	Sauerland-Express	Hagen – Schwerte (Ruhr) - Fröndenberg – Arnsberg (Westf) – Warburg (– Kassel-Wilhelmshöhe)	60 min
RB 89	Ems-Börde-Bahn	Münster (Westf) – Hamm (Westf) – Paderborn – Warburg	120 min

InterCity trains also stop in Warburg.

Line	Route	Frequency
ICE 41	(Cologne – ) Düsseldorf – Duisburg – Essen – Dortmund - Hamm (Westf) – Paderborn – Warburg (Westf) – Kassel-Wilhelmshöhe - Würzburg – Nuremberg – Munich	One train pair
IC 51	(Cologne - ) Düsseldorf - Duisburg – Essen – Dortmund – Hamm (Westf) – Paderborn – Warburg (Westf) - Kassel-Wilhelmshöhe – Erfurt – Weimar – Jena West – Jena-Göschwitz – Gera Hbf	Two train pairs

Warburg station is part of the Paderborn-Höxter Regional Transport Association (Nahverkehrsverbund Paderborn-Höxter). Services to and from Hesse are covered by the Nordhessischer Verkehrsverbund (North Hesse Transport Association).

== Accessibility ==
A bus station is located in front of the building, catering for bus services in the city of Warburg and the surrounding villages.
