= Fröndenberg station =

Railway station in Fröndenberg, Germany

Fröndenberg
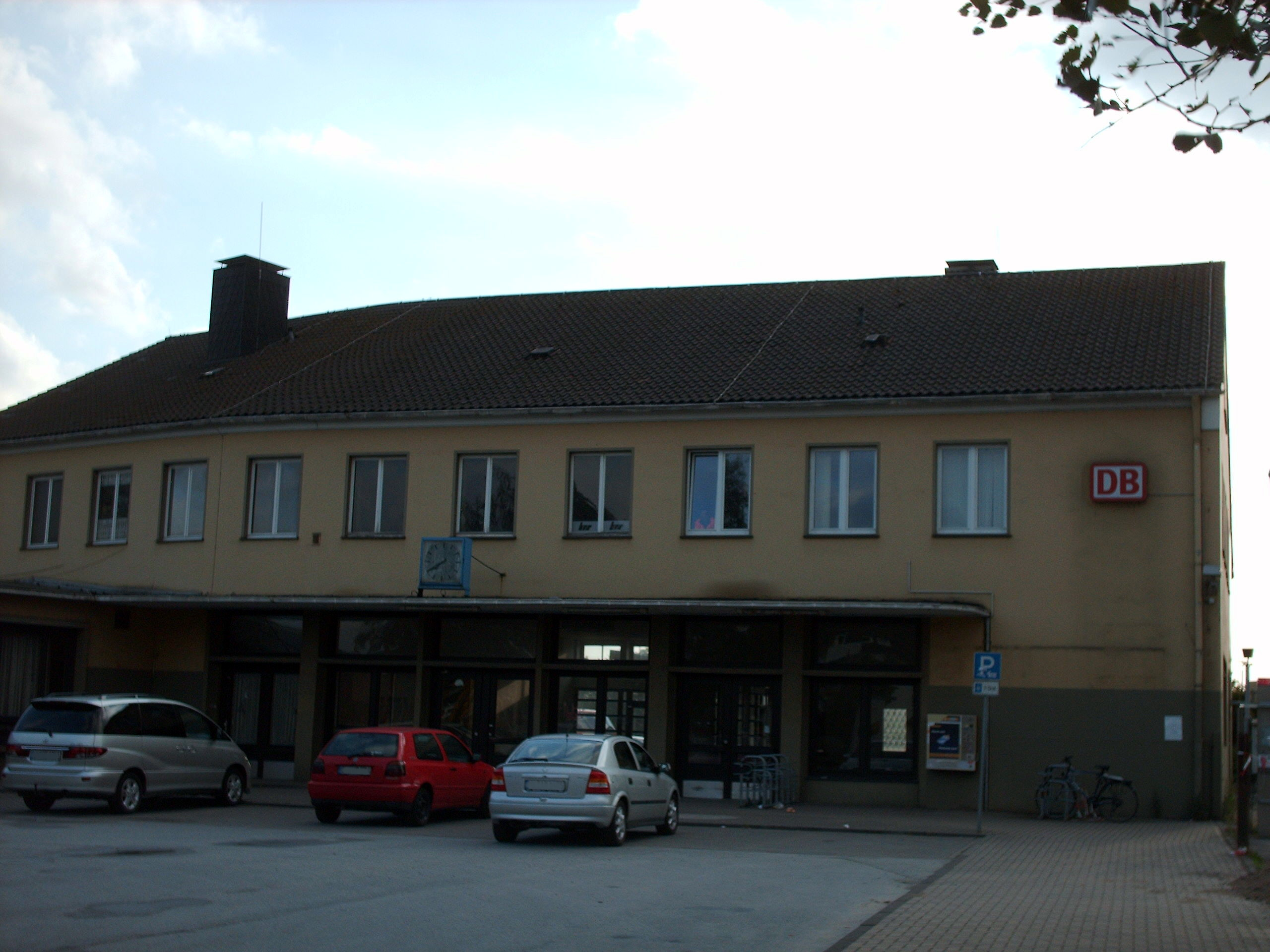

General information
- Location: Bahnhofstr. 15, Fröndenberg, NRW; Germany
- Coordinates: 51°28′18″N 7°45′39″E
- Lines: Upper Ruhr Valley (KBS 435); Lemanthe–Fröndenburg (KBS 437)
- Platforms: 5

Construction
- Accessible: Yes

Other information
- Station code: 1969
- DS100 code: EFOE
- IBNR: 8000113
- Category: 4
- Fare zone: Westfalentarif: 42591
- Website: www.bahnhof.de

History
- Opened: 1 June 1870

Services
Preceding station	DB Regio NRW	Following station
Schwerte (Ruhr) towards Hagen Hbf	RE 17	Wickede (Ruhr) towards Kassel-Wilhelmshöhe
Dortmund-Hörde towards Dortmund Hbf	RE 57	Wickede (Ruhr) towards Winterberg (Westphalia) or Brilon Stadt
Ardey towards Unna	RB 54	Bösperde towards Neuenrade
Location
- Location within North Rhine-Westphalia

Fröndenberg station is a junction station on the Upper Ruhr Valley Railway and the Letmathe–Fröndenberg railway. It is in the German state of North Rhine-Westphalia between the Ruhr river to the south and the city of Fröndenberg to the northeast.

The station building has been closed and converted into a hotel for cyclists and a bicycle parking facility. Since 2009, Deutsche Post has erected a Packstation here. The ticket office has been replaced by a ticket machine. Previously there was a freight yard, part of which is now used for supermarket parking and the rest for station parking.

== Services ==
The station is served by the following services, all at 60-minute intervals:

Line	Service	Route	Interval
RE 17	Sauerland-Express	Hagen – Fröndenberg – Arnsberg (Westf) – Brilon-Wald – Warburg (–Kassel Hbf – Kassel-Wilhelmshöhe)	60 minutes
RE 57	Dortmund-Sauerland-Express	Dortmund – Fröndenberg – Arnsberg – Bestwig – Winterberg	60 minutes
RB 54	Hönnetal-Bahn	Northern route: Unna – Fröndenberg – Menden (Sauerland) – Balve – Neuenrade; Southern route: Fröndenberg – Menden (Sauerland) – Lendringsen – Balve – Neuenrade	60 minutes. The two services overlap to create a service every 30 minutes between Fröndenberg and Menden

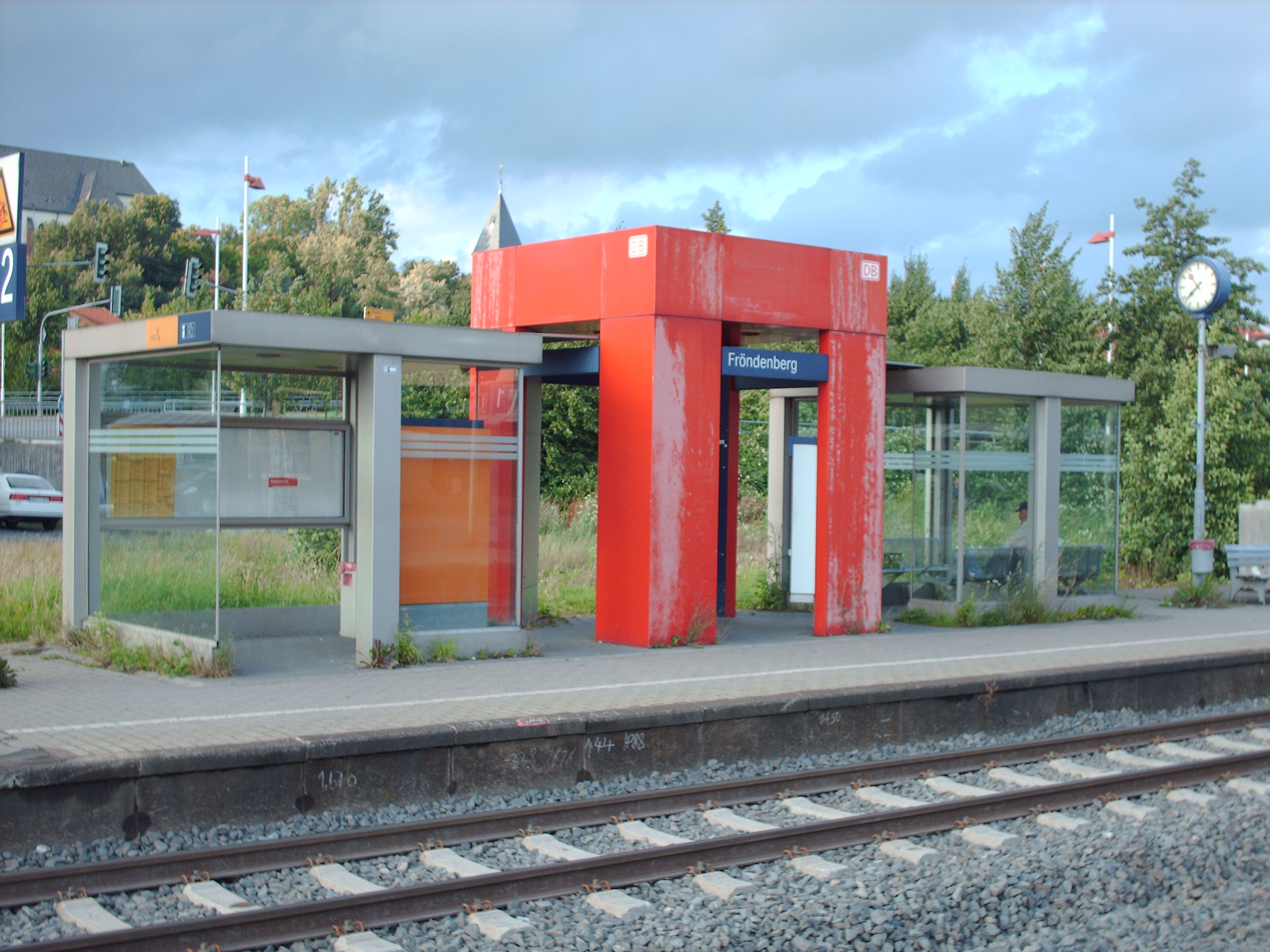
Station

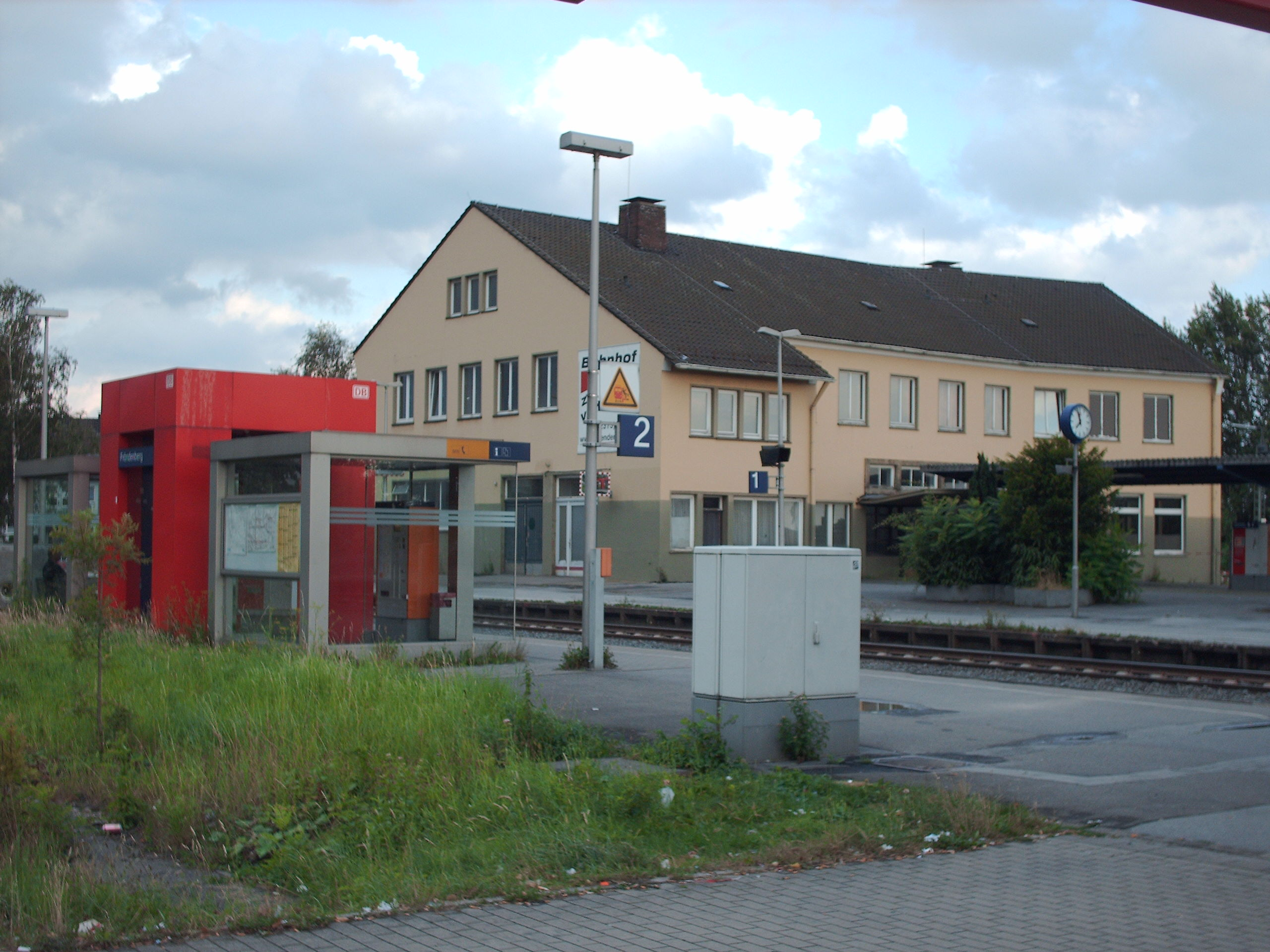
Station
