= Sauerland-Express =

RE 17 Sauerland-Express
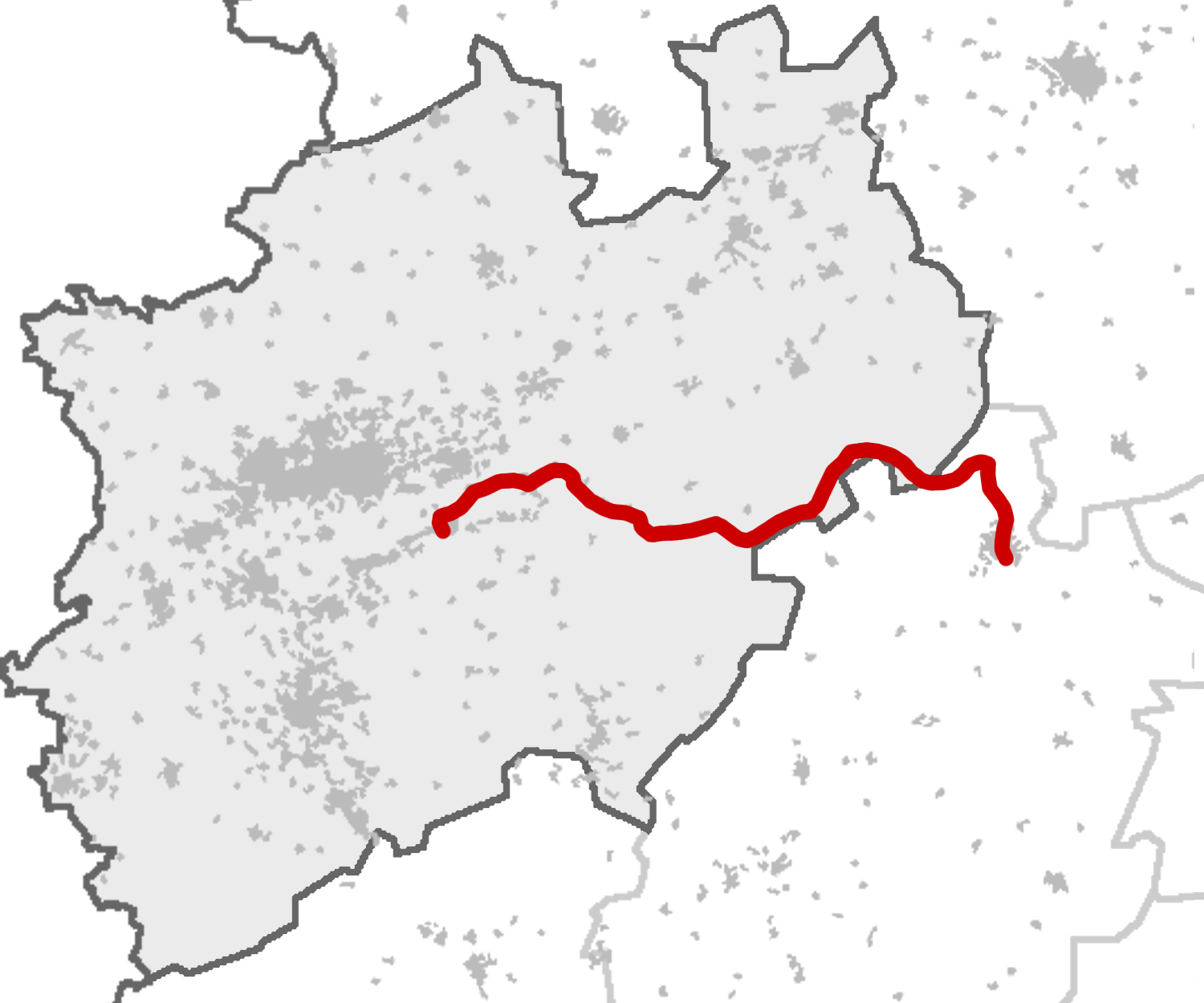

Overview
- Locale: North Rhine-Westphalia, Germany

Service
- Route number: 430, 435
- Operator(s): DB Regio NRW

Technical
- Line length: 209 km (130 mi)
- Operating speed: 140 km/h (87 mph) (maximum)

The Sauerland-Express RE 17 is a Regional-Express service in the German state of North Rhine-Westphalia, running from Hagen to Warburg (Westf). It is managed by the Verkehrsverbund Rhein-Ruhr (Rhine-Ruhr Transport Association), the Verkehrsgemeinschaft Ruhr-Lippe (Ruhr-Lippe Transport Company, VRL), the Nahverkehrsverbund Paderborn-Höxter (Paderborn-Höxter Local Transport Association, nph) and the Nordhessischer Verkehrsverbund (North Hessian Transport Association, NVV). It is operated by DB Regio NRW with Pesa Link electric multiple units (class 633).

The operation of the service from December 2016 was awarded as part of the Sauerland Net (Sauerland-Netz). Previously the line had been operated by DB Regio under a directly awarded contract.

== Services ==
The service runs between Hagen and Kassel-Wilhelmshöhe every two hours and between Warburg and Hagen additional services produce an hourly service. The services to and from Kassel use electric multiple units of class 612 (RegioSwinger) while those on the cycle turning back at Warburg use class 628.4 sets. On Fridays and Sundays, some special services run to Willingen. The Fröndenberg–Bestwig section is also supplemented with an hourly service of the RE 57 (the Dortmund-Sauerland-Express), which continues to Winterberg.

Until the timetable change in December 2023, some train pairs ran to Kassel-Wilhelmshöhe. On the section between Warburg and Kassel, the RE 17 alternated with the Rhein-Hellweg-Express (RE 11) On the section between Warburg and Kassel, the RE 17 has only stopped in Hofgeismar since the timetable change on 15 December 2013, which also omitted a stop at Kassel Hauptbahnhof. This shortened the journey time to and from Kassel-Wilhelmshöhe by up to 13 minutes.

== Rollingstock ==
Earlier the RE 17 was operated with Class 218 locomotives hauling three to six Silberling carriages together with class 624 diesel multiple units. The Warburg cycles were changed in the mid-1990s to class 628.4 DMUs. From the beginning of the 21st century, the locomotive-hauled trains on the Kassel cycles were replaced by class 612 (RegioSwinger) DMUs. Individual services to Willingen were operated with trains hauled by class 218 locomotives until 2006. From December 2016, class 644 sets were used alongside the class 612 sets. Class 633 diesel multiple units now run here.

== Current operations ==
The contract for the operation of the Sauerland-Express from 2016 as part of the Sauerland network was let to DB Regio. The rolling stock now used, are DMUs of the Link type (II or III) from the Polish manufacturer Pesa SA. The new trains for the Sauerland network were only available from December 2018. The delivery delay was bridged by replacement rolling stock. Most of the operations of the Sauerland-Express between Warburg and Kassel were abandoned during this process, this form of transport instead being provided by extending the RE 11 "Rhein-Hellweg-Express" (Düsseldorf – Duisburg – Dortmund – Hamm – Paderborn – Kassel-Wilhelmshöhe).

== Route ==
The line operates from Hagen to Schwerte on the Hagen–Hamm railway and from Schwerte to Warburg on the Upper Ruhr Valley Railway. In Warburg it changes to the Frederick William Northern Railway, also known as the Hessische Nordbahn (Hessian Northern Railway).

== Connections ==
Station	Connections to/from	Line
Hagen	Bochum, Dortmund, Düsseldorf, Essen, Hamm, Iserlohn, Cologne, Lüdenscheid, Siegen, Solingen, Venlo (NL), Wuppertal	RE 4, RE 7, RE 13, RE 16, RB 40, RB 52, RB 91, S8, S5, ICE 10, ICE 19, IC 55
Schwerte (Ruhr)	Dortmund, Düsseldorf, Hamm, Iserlohn, Cologne, Münster as well as Rheine, Solingen, Venlo (NL), Wuppertal	RE 7, RE 13, RB 53
Fröndenberg	Menden, Neuenrade, Unna	RB 54, RE 57
Bestwig	Winterberg	RE 57
Brilon Wald	Korbach, Willingen, Brilon Stadt	RE 97, RB 97, RE 57
Warburg	Dresden, Hofgeismar, Münster, Ostseebad Binz	3, RB 89, ICE 41, IC 51

== See also ==
- List of regional rail lines in North Rhine-Westphalia
