= Bombardier RegioSwinger =

RegioSwinger
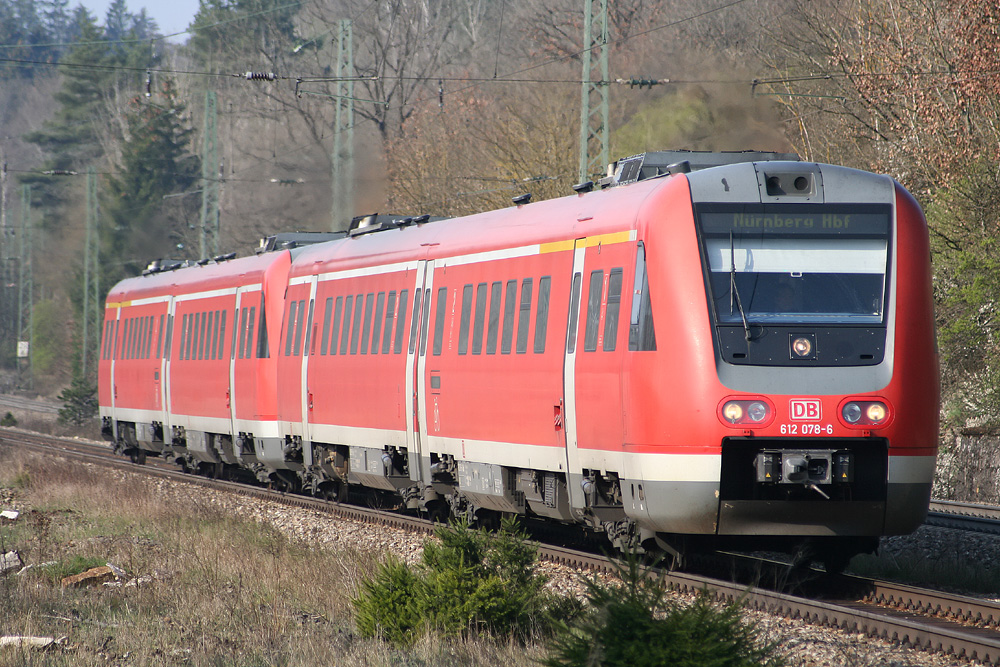
- A RegioSwinger in use as Allgäu-Franken-Express in Treuchtlingen

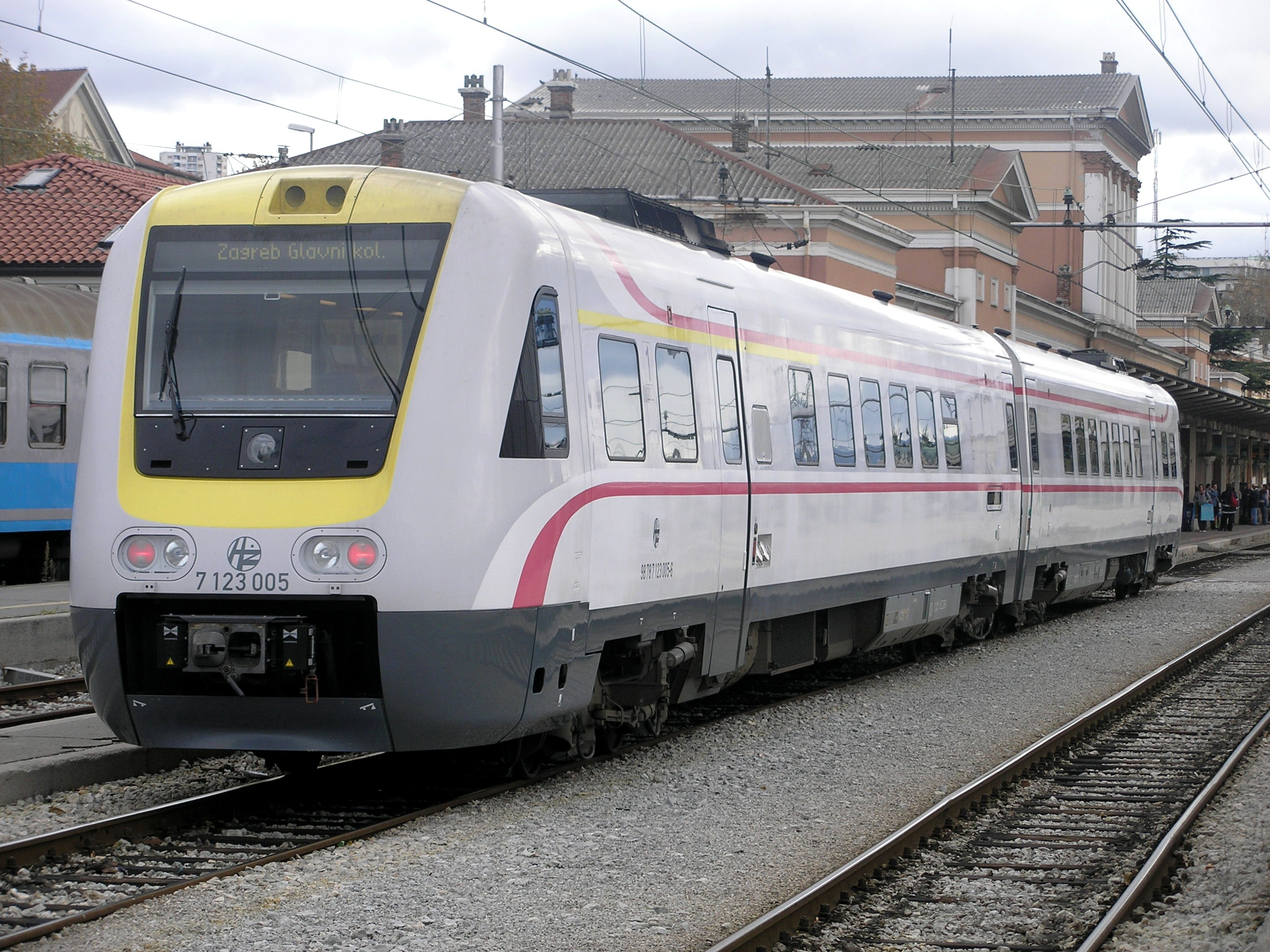
- A Croatian RegioSwinger in Rijeka, Croatia
- Manufacturer: Adtranz, Hennigsdorf factory Bombardier Transportation
- Constructed: 1998–present
- Number built: 192 (8 in HŽ,184 in DB)

Specifications
- Train length: 51,750 mm (169 ft 9 in)
- Maximum speed: 160 km/h (99 mph)
- Weight: 116 t (114 long tons; 128 short tons)
- Prime mover(s): Cummins QSK-19, at each end
- Engine type: Diesel
- Power output: 2 x 560 kW (751 hp)
- Transmission: Hydraulic
- UIC classification: 2'B'+B'2'
- Coupling system: Scharfenberg coupler
- Multiple working: Up to 4 sets
- Track gauge: 1,435 mm (4 ft 8 1/2 in) standard gauge

The RegioSwinger is a tilting diesel multiple unit (DMU) passenger train used for fast regional traffic on unelectrified lines.

== Development and service ==
The RegioSwinger was first manufactured by Adtranz in Hennigsdorf, before it became part of Bombardier Transportation in 2001. The train is in use in Germany with Deutsche Bahn as class 612.

The series was introduced to Croatia with Croatian Railways as HŽ 7123 or InterCity Nagibni (ICN) in 2004. (8 units in total). The public shortened that name, so it caught the nickname nagibni (swinger) in Croatia, and became known also by that short name, due to commercials. These trains are normally deployed on the mountainous route between the two largest Croatian cities, route Zagreb - Split, but are occasionally used on other routes in the country (depending on need and availability). In the case of the Zagreb-Split route, this offers passengers a more comfortable and time-saving journey than previous trains whose journey took 8 hours, whereas the tilting trains offer shorter journey time with less noise and better amenities.

However, the safety of the tilting trains and their possible technical incompatibility with the conditions of the Croatian railroads are disputed after the 2009 Rudine train derailment, an incident that occurred on 24 July of that year, in which six passengers were killed and 55 were injured in the crash. Approximately 3 years before this on 24 November 2006, there was another accident in which the train's engineer was killed; the tilting train crashed into a lorry at a rail crossing that had no ramp or warning lights. Out of eight trainsets introduced in 2004, two are thus out of service. The tilting train services may therefore have to be reduced as there are no longer enough train-sets to serve all scheduled ICN trains and destinations.

Class 612's predecessor was class 611, which due to heavy problems with the tilting system and the chassis was largely considered a failure. Even though class 612 sticks to the principle of an electric tilting system (Neicontrol-E), it was newly engineered from the beginning.

The first units were delivered in 1998 and worked reliably until 2004, when cracks were detected in a number of wheel sets. For safety reasons, the tilting system was disabled and subsequently the maximum speed on tilting lines was reduced, causing a massive disorder in the schedules. As before with class 611, wheels and axles had to be replaced. Starting in 2005, class 612 was equipped with hardened molybdenum axles. Today class 612 is back to tilting operation and forms the backbone of DB's fast regional service on unelectrified lines.

After ICE TD class 605 was grounded due to a fracture of an axle in one unit, it was replaced by class 612 on the Dresden-Munich line 2003, as replacement by anything other than a tilting DMU would have meant an extension of travel time. Even though class 612 was not constructed for ICE-type travelling comfort, 16 units were repainted in the ICE livery and renumbered as class 612.4. However, one year later the same problem forced DB to disable the tilting system on the replacement.

== Technical information ==
Passenger and driver compartments are fully air-conditioned. Class 612 units comprise two motorised coaches, each with a 560 kW (751 hp) Cummins engine (type QSK-19). The power is transferred hydraulically. Up to four units can be connected by the Scharfenberg coupler, with the on-board computers automatically choosing the train configuration.

Besides pneumatic brakes and a hydraulic braking system, class 612 is also equipped with an electro-magnetic brake. The maximum tilt is 8°.

== Accidents ==
On July 24, 2009, a train derailed near Rudine, Croatia, with 119 passengers aboard, killing 6 and injuring 55, on the Zagreb-Split line. According to Croatian news reports, the cause of the derailment was slippery fire retardant that was just sprayed on a steep downhill section of the track, a normal practice in extreme summer heat but executed improperly using a new chemical. With brakes ineffective, the train gained a speed higher than the track configuration could handle and derailed.

Croatian news media report that this section of the track was reconstructed in 2005 and that the particular train passed inspection just two days prior to the accident, but the accident brought back the debate on whether these trains are appropriate for local conditions. Investigation continues, with questionable application of fire retardant (recently changed to "aqueous based resin liquid penetrate" TG-300 from a new supplier) emerging as the most likely cause of the accident.

== Gallery ==
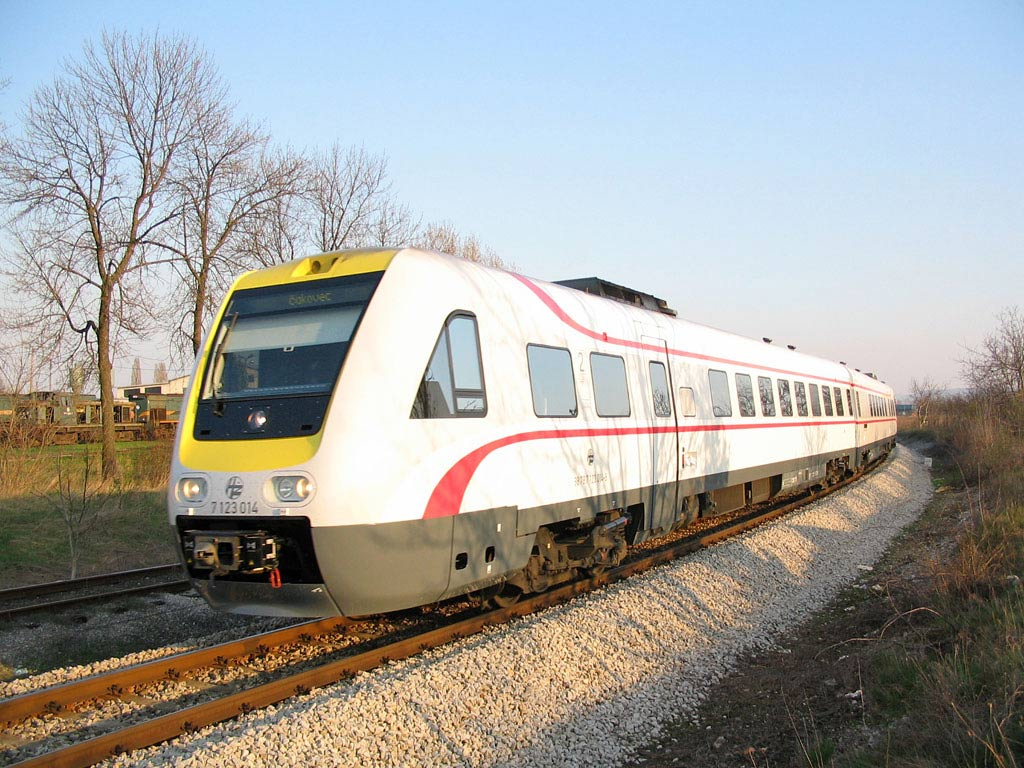
The Croatian version of the RegioSwinger: InterCityNagibni.

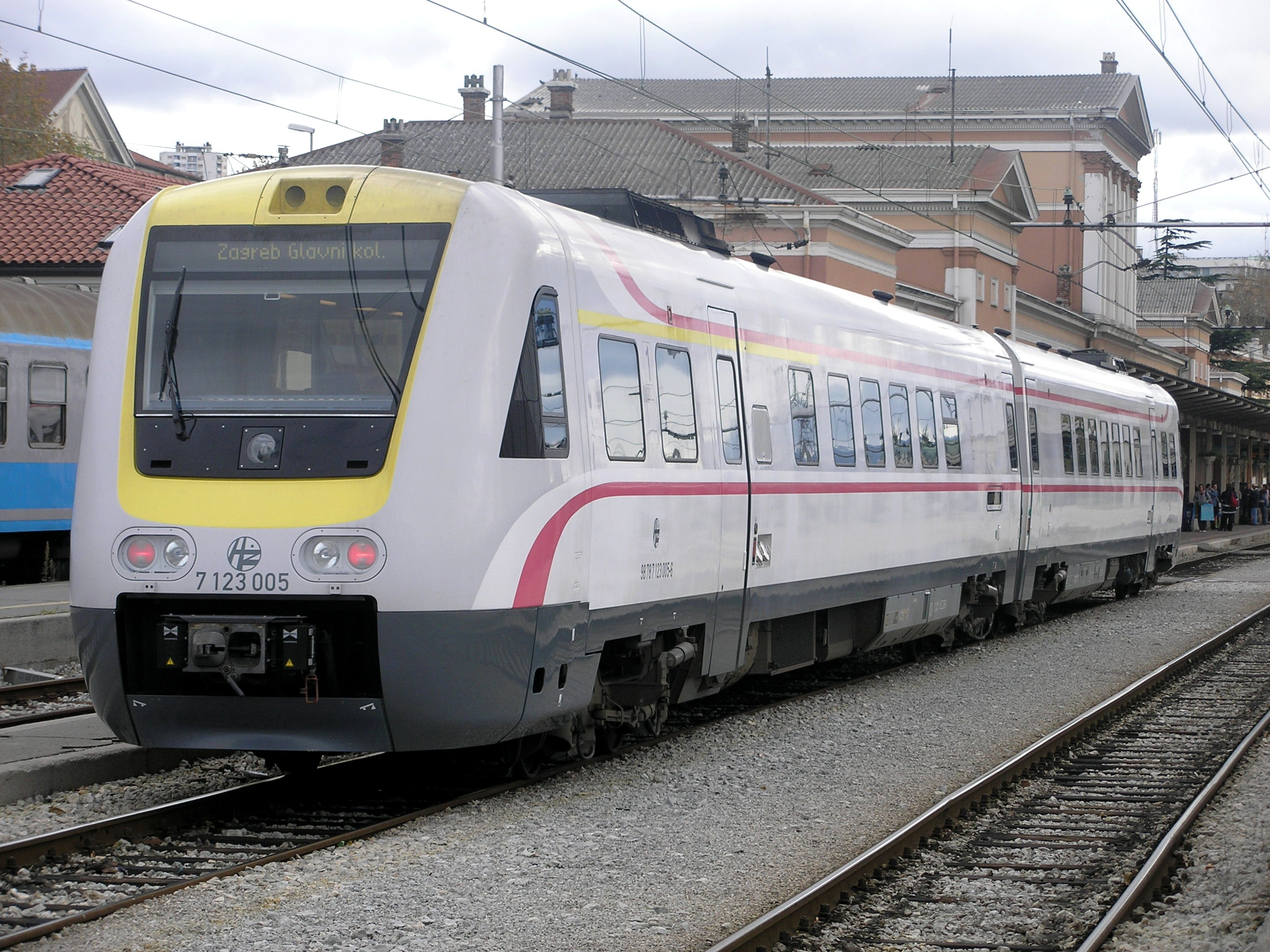

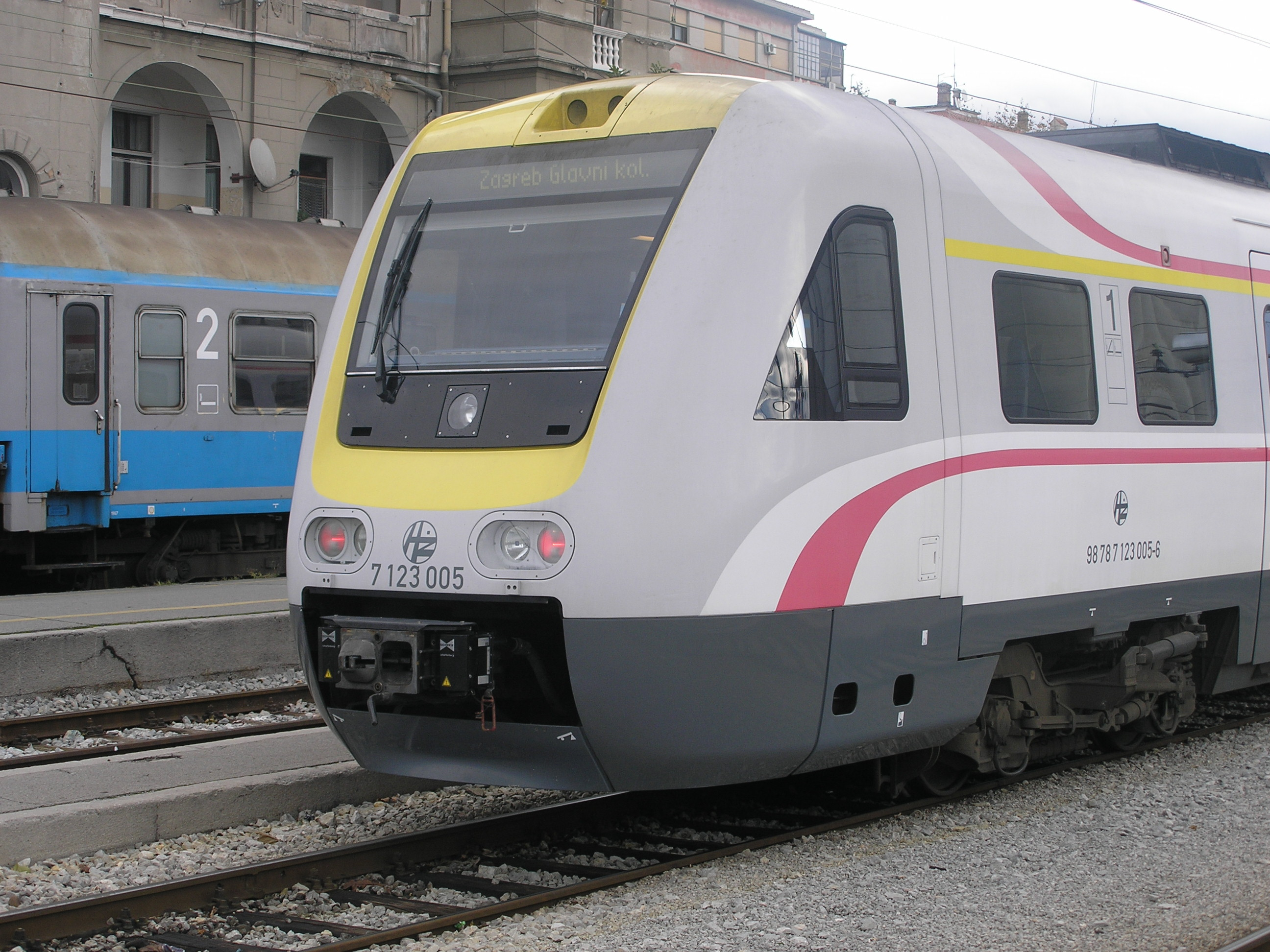

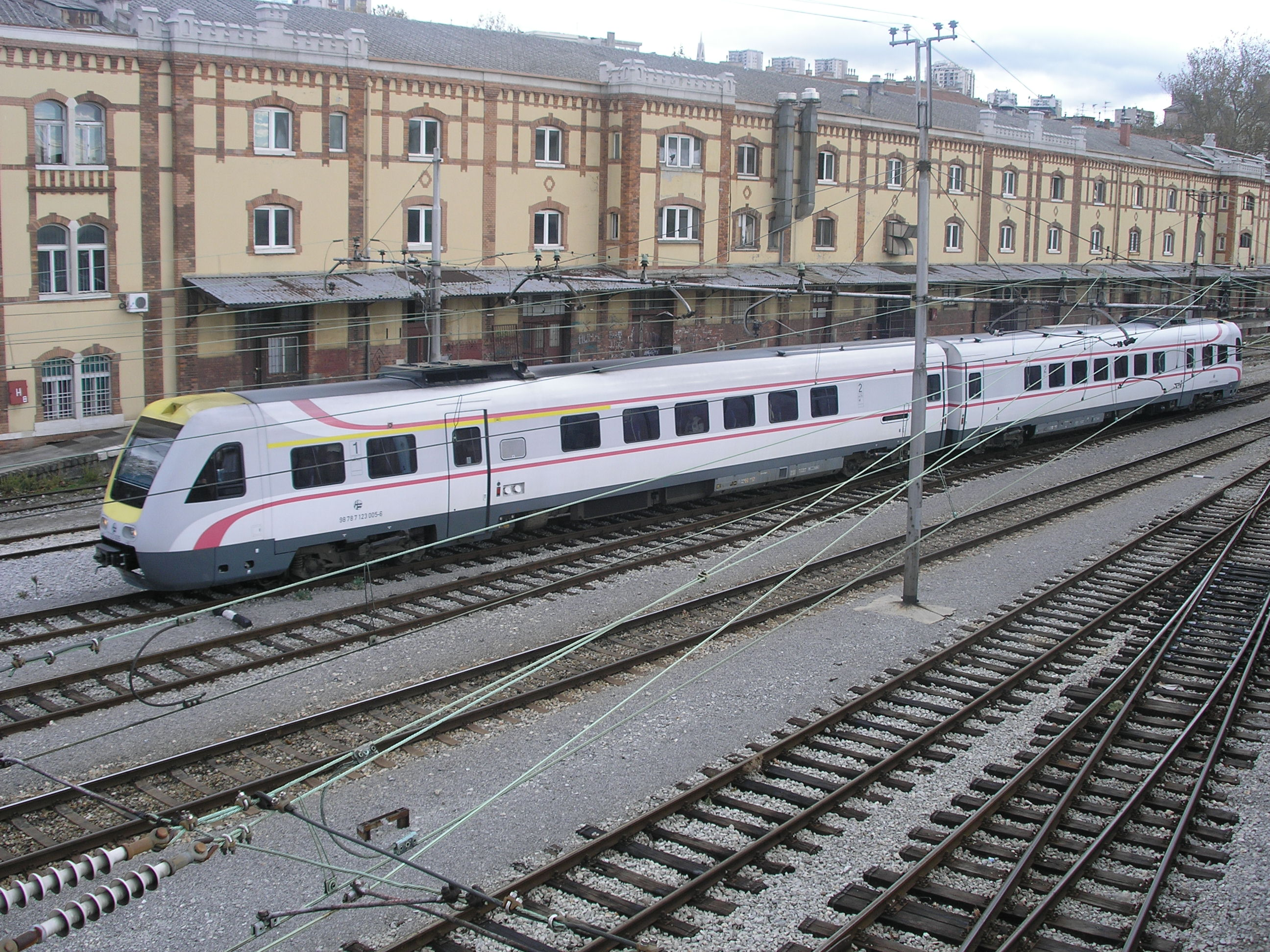

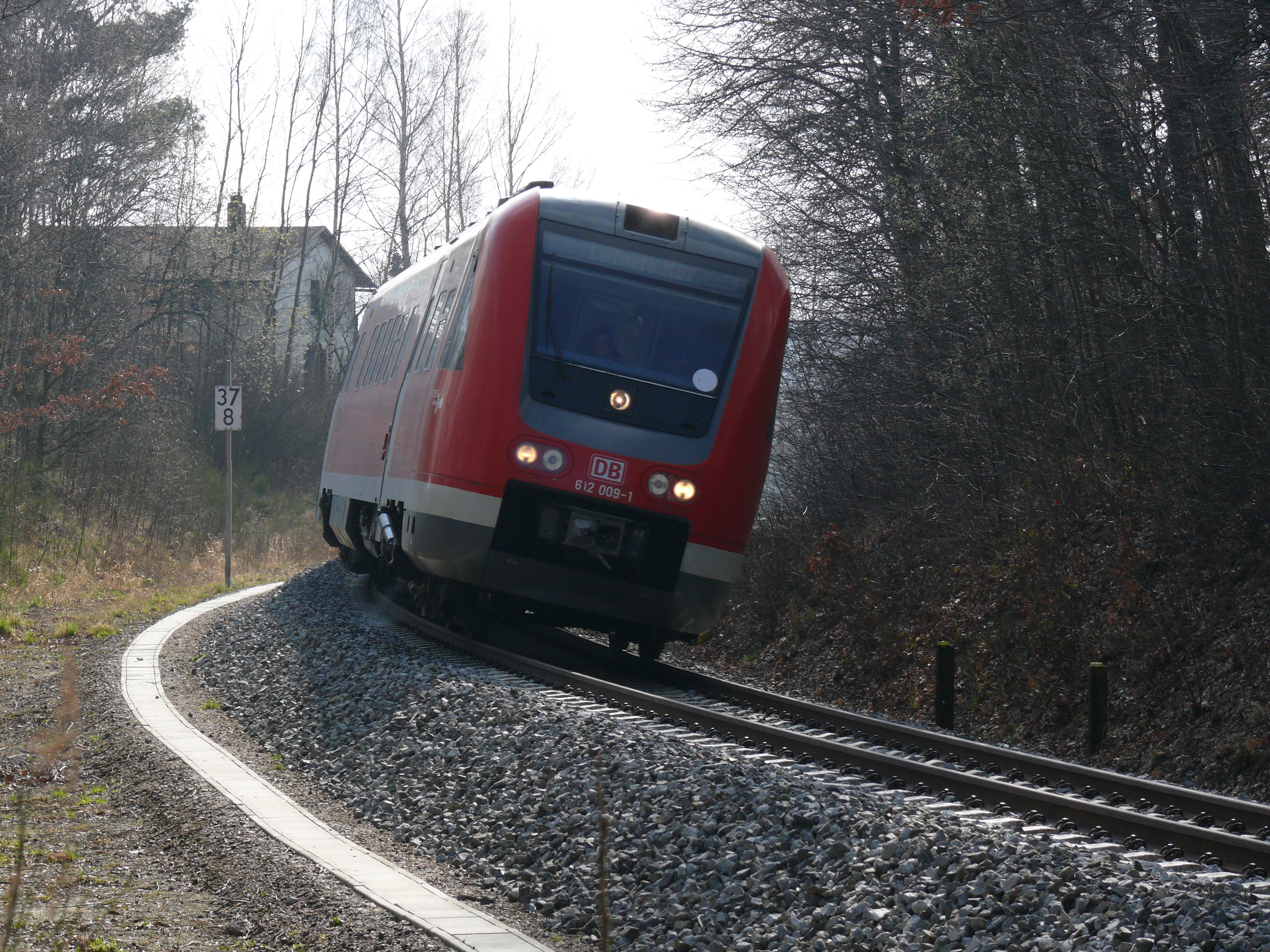
A German RegioSwinger in a tilting operation.

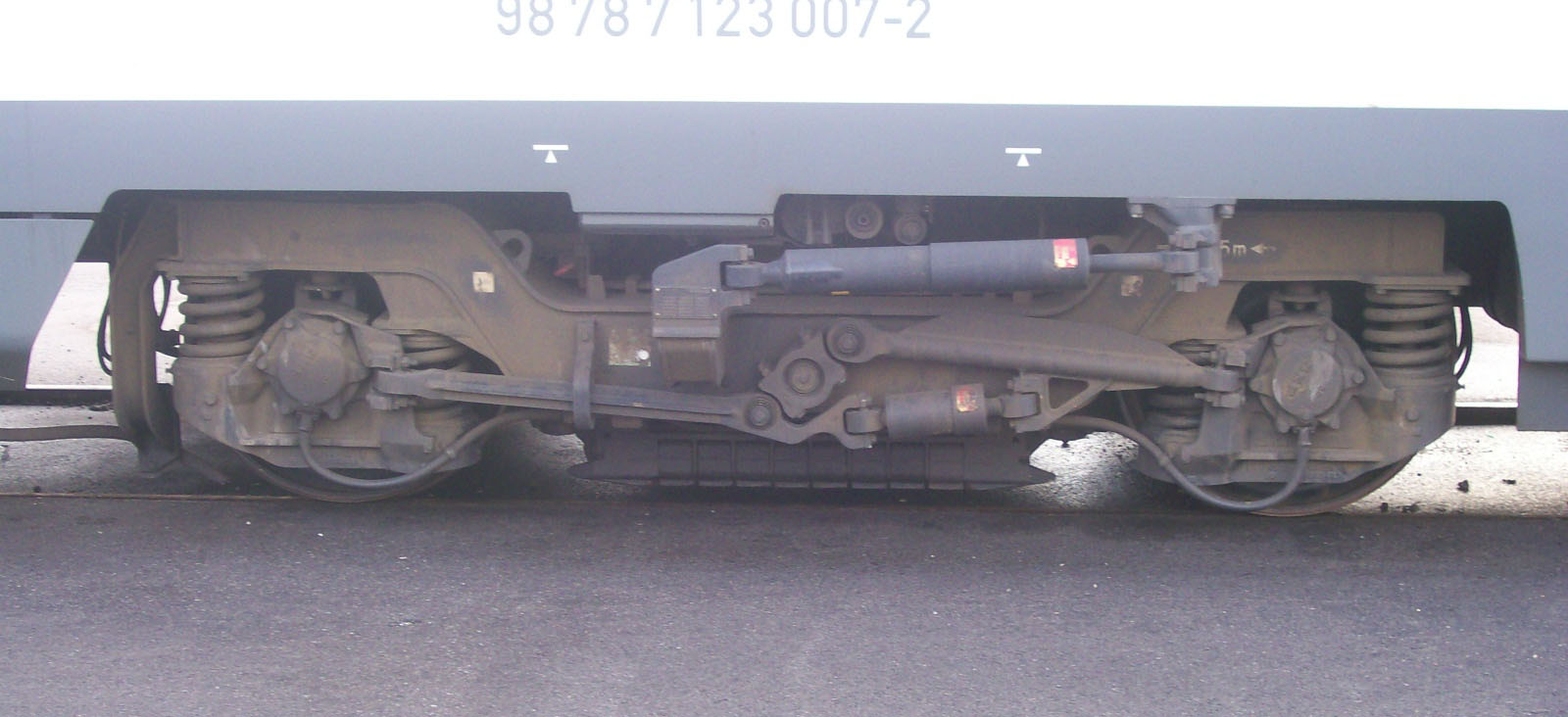
Bogies

== Comfort ==
- Passengers have criticised that the seats in class 612 are too hard, especially for longer distances.
- Class 612 in Germany has been nicknamed Wackel-Dackel (wobbling Dachshund).
- The tilting effect causes motion sickness in some people.
