= Hofgeismar =

- Town
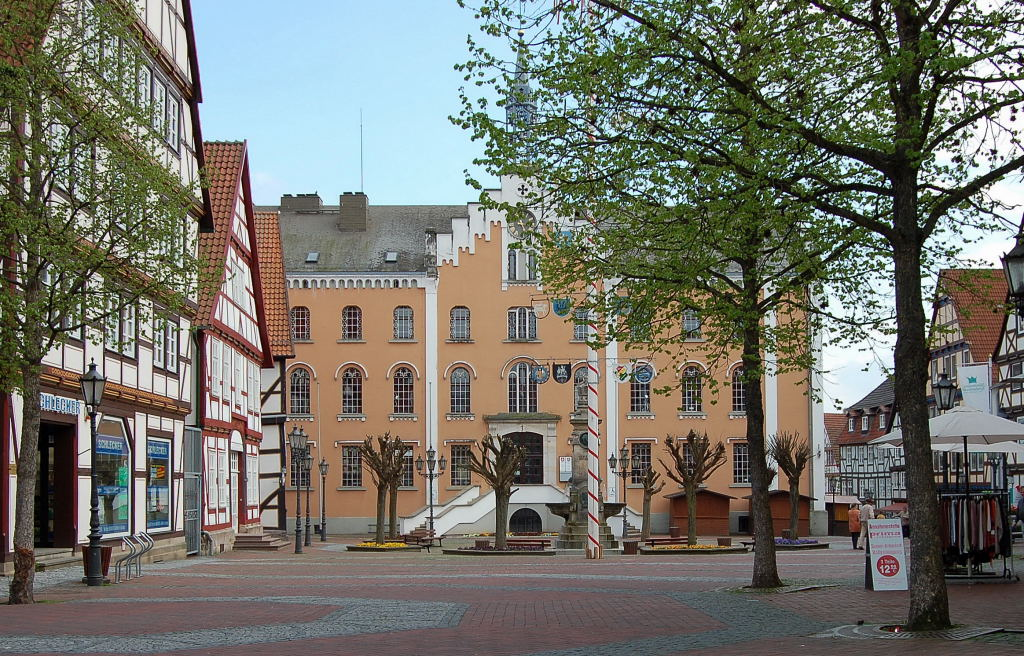
- Town hall

- Coat of arms

- Location of Hofgeismar within Kassel district
- Interactive map of Hofgeismar
- Location within Germany Location within Hesse
- Coordinates: 51°29′N 09°24′E
- Country: Germany
- State: Hesse
- Admin. region: Kassel
- District: Kassel

Government
  - Mayor (2020–26): Torben Busse (CDU)

Area
  - Total: 86.37 km^{2} (33.35 sq mi)
- Elevation: 161 m (528 ft)

Population (2025-12-31)
  - Total: 14,324
  - Density: 165.8/km^{2} (429.5/sq mi)
- Time zone: UTC+01:00 (CET)
  - Summer (DST): UTC+02:00 (CEST)
- Postal codes: 34369
- Dialling codes: 05671
- Vehicle registration: KS, HOG, WOH
- Website: www.hofgeismar.de

Hofgeismar (German pronunciation: [hoːfˈɡaɪsmaʁ]) is a town in the district of Kassel, in northern Hesse, Germany. It is located 25 km north of Kassel on the German Timber-Frame Road. In 1978 and in 2015, the town hosted the 18th Hessentag state festival.

== History ==
The first written document mentioning Hofgeismar dates back to the year 1082.

== People ==
- Martin Zielke (born 1963), German banker
- Anna Nguyen (born 1990), German politician
- Stefan Ortega (born 1992), German footballer for Manchester City

== See also ==
- Schöneberg (Hofgeismar)
