= Hönne Valley Railway =

Railway line in Germany

Menden–Neuenrade railway

Overview
- Native name: Hönnetalbahn
- Line number: 2853
- Locale: North Rhine-Westphalia, Germany

Service
- Route number: 437

Technical
- Line length: 22 km (14 mi)
- Track gauge: 1,435 mm (4 ft 8 1/2 in) standard gauge
- Operating speed: 60 km/h (37 mph)

The Hönne Valley Railway (German: Hönnetalbahn) is a 22 km long, single-track and non-electrified branch line in the German state of North Rhine-Westphalia, running from Menden (Sauerland) to Neuenrade through the Hönne valley. It is operated as timetable route 437 from Unna via Fröndenberg, Menden (Sauerland) and Balve to Neuenrade.

The line runs through two tunnels and across seven bridges made of natural stone through the Hönne valley, which was already praised for its beauty during the period of German romanticism when it was built.

== History ==
The Menden–Neuenrade railway was inaugurated on 1 April 1912, with construction beginning in 1909.

At its opening there were stations at Neuenrade, Garbeck, Balve, Sanssouci, Binolen and Lendringsen and halts (German: Haltepunkte) at Küntrop, Volkringhausen, Klusenstein, Oberrödinghausen and Menden-Süd. Horlecke station was located between Lendringsen and Menden-Süd, but was no longer classified as a station by 1967.

The railway was primarily used for the industry of the Hönne valley. Because of the new traffic, limestone bridges were built along the railway in Binolen, Sanssouci, Balve and Garbeck. The economic growth was interrupted by the outbreak of the First World War, which brought a restriction on passenger traffic. In the “turnip winter” (Steckrübenwinter) of 1917/18, this line also supplied potatoes and grain to the starving population of the Ruhr. After 1925, the operation of excursion passenger trains increased again.

Before the Second World War, there were so many visitors to the valley that "car-free” Sundays were introduced to provide guests with rest and relaxation. In the period after the First World War trains from the Ruhr on Sundays carried up to 1000 people travelling to the valley's numerous restaurants. Between the two wars the narrow valley discouraged the development of an Emden–Hönne valley–Frankfurt railway as a north-south link protected against enemy (French) action.

The line was disrupted during the war by the destruction of the Ruhr bridge at Fröndenberg as a result of the floodwave caused by the air raid on the Mohne Dam (Operation Chastise) on 17 May 1943. After the construction of a temporary bridge rail traffic resumed and was also used to supply the labour camp for Schwalbe I (an underground factory built to avoid air raids) at Öberrödinghausen. Two years later, the railway was closed again by the blowing up of the railway bridge in Sanssouci. In June 1945, traffic was resumed after the construction of a temporary bridge, which was used until 1952.

In the mid-1950s, it was the most profitable branch line of the Bundesbahndirektion (railway division of) Wuppertal. In the following years there were a series of rationalisation measures. Despite the rationalisation, traffic increased steadily in the following years. In recent years, the line has been threatened with closure several times.

There were plans to extend the Hönne Valley Railway from Neuenrade to Werdohl or build a branch from Sanssouci towards Plettenberg, connecting to the existing Ruhr–Sieg railway. These plans were abandoned.

== Operations ==
=== Passengers ===
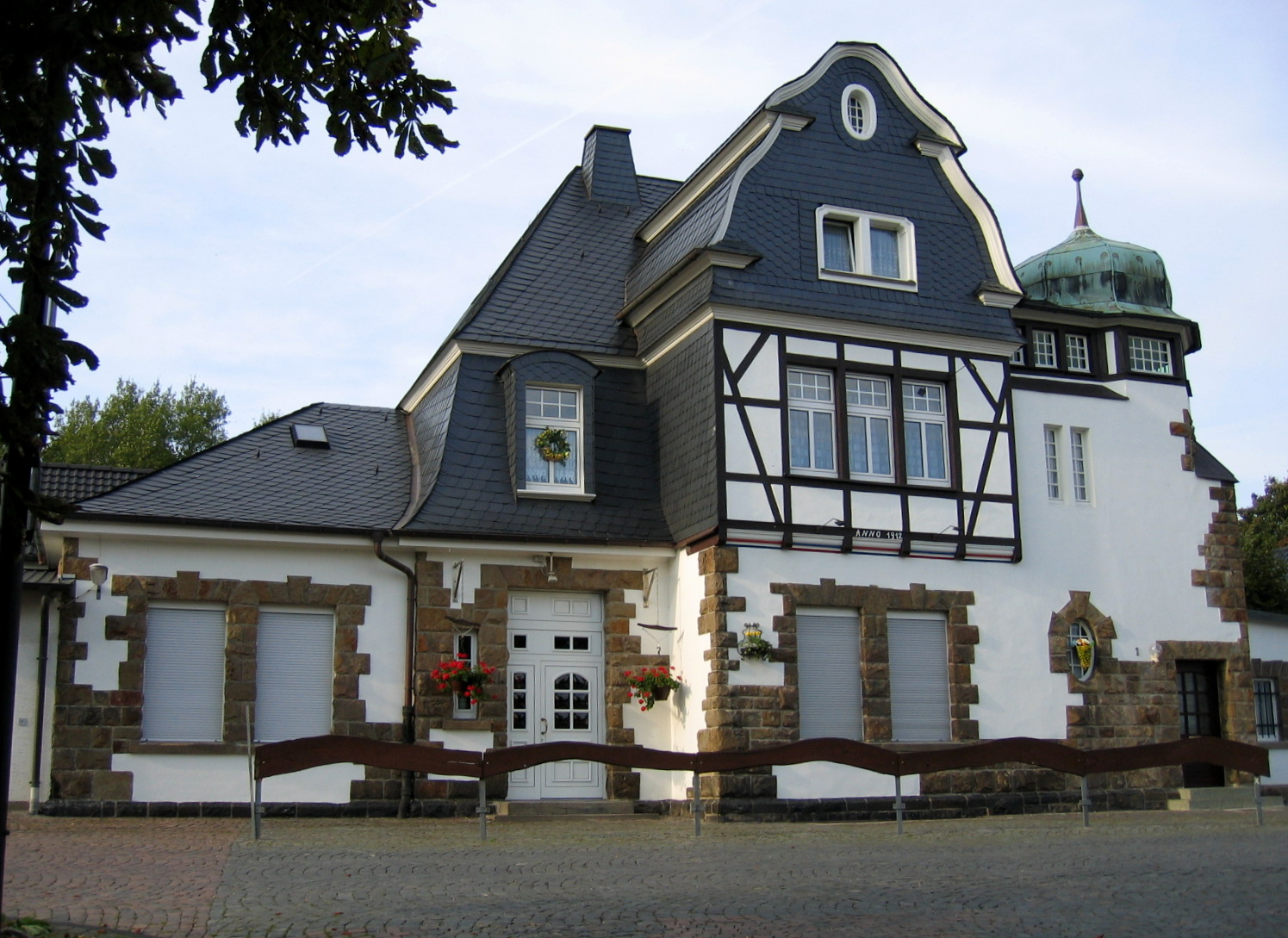
Former station building in Balve

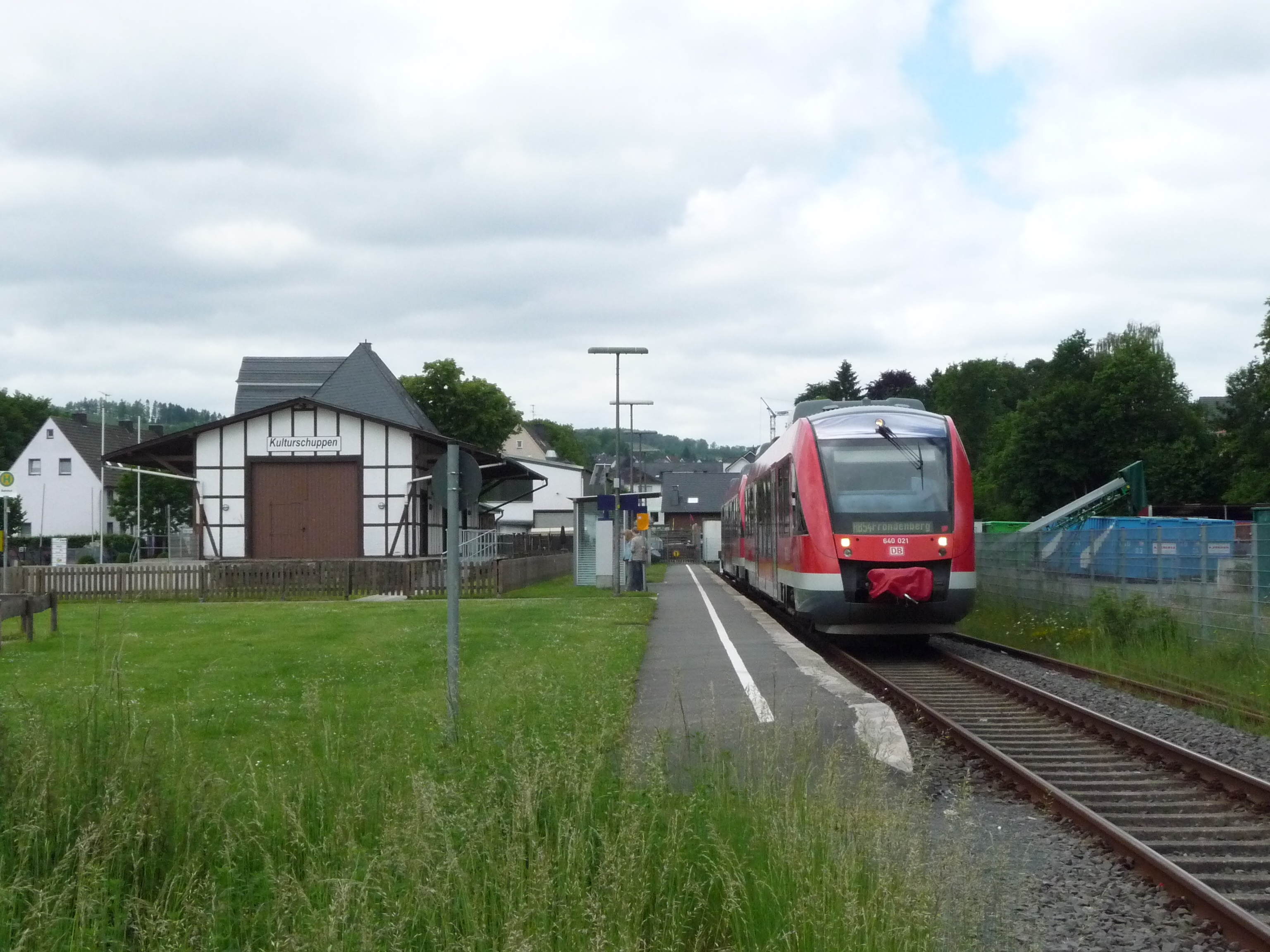
RB 29458 composed of 2 Alstom Coradia LINT cars in Neuenrade

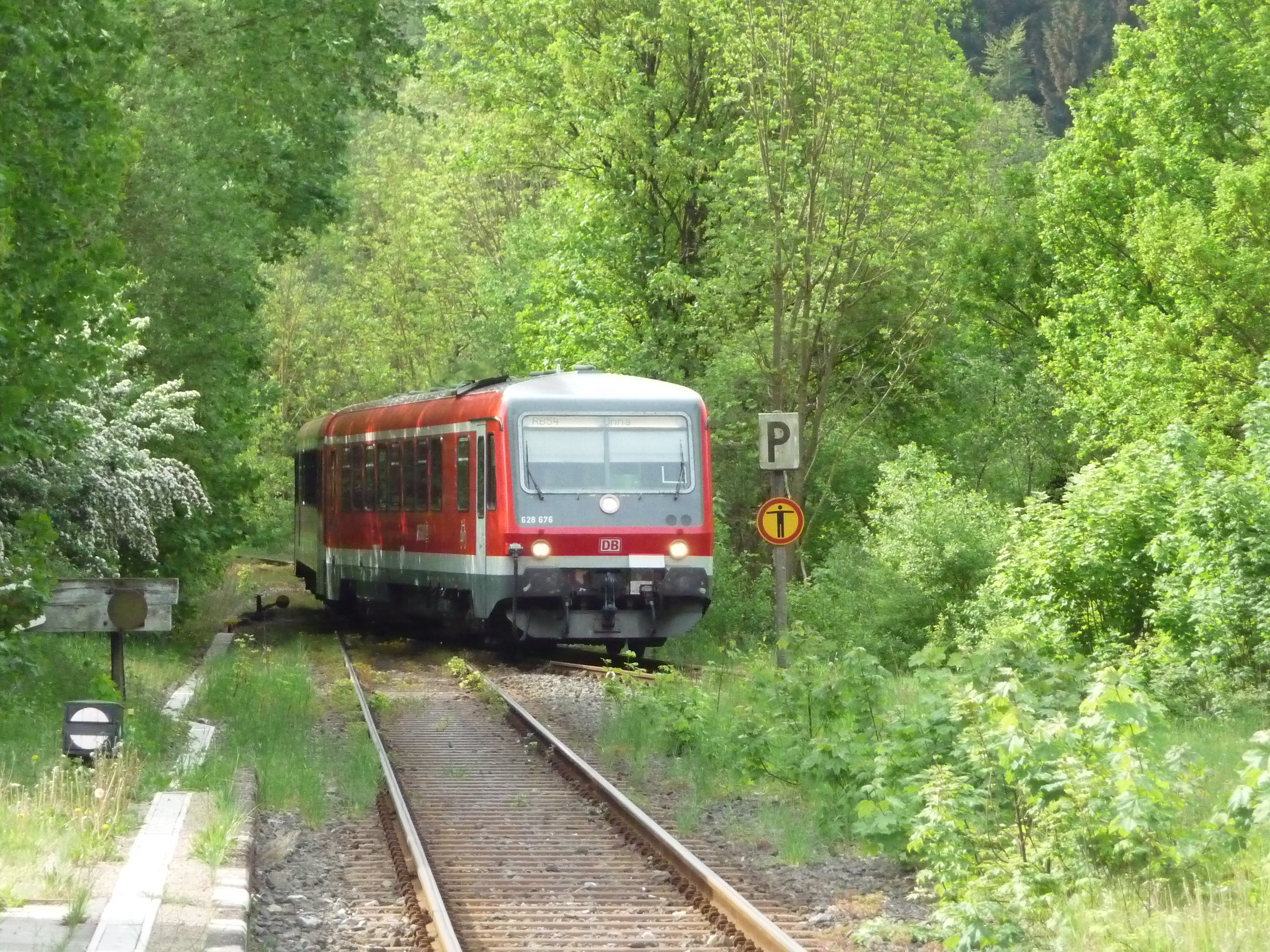
628 676 near the entrance to Binolen station on 10 May 2011.

The Hönne Valley Railway is served by Regionalbahn service RB 54 (Hönnetal-Bahn). Services run hourly in both directions between Unna and Neuenrade on weekdays with trains crossing in Binolen on the hour. Fewer services run on weekends. Trains run at least every two hours to and from Neuenrade.

Services on the Hönne Valley Railway are operated by DB Regio NRW, using Alstom Coradia LINT 41 (class 648) diesel railcars, which by supplemented by LINT 27 (class 640) diesel railcars. The LINT 41 railcars can be operated either singly or doubly, as required, while the LINT 27 railcars are usually operated in double traction. In addition trains made up of a LINT 41 and two LINT 27 sets are a common sight for school services. Operations on the Hönne Valley Railway, along with the lines from Dortmund to Winterberg, Iserlohn and Lüdenscheid, were awarded in 2004 as a tender package called the Sauerland Net to DB Regionalbahn Westfalen, which has now been absorbed into DB Regio NRW.

Before the use of DMUs of class 624 and 628 from about 1994, the line was operated for many years by locomotive-hauled trains usually formed as a push-pull service of Silberling carriages and class 212 diesel locomotives.

=== Freight ===
The freight is limited now to operations to the Rheinkalk lime works in Oberrödinghausen Lendringsen and an industrial siding in Menden.
