= Hemer =

- Town
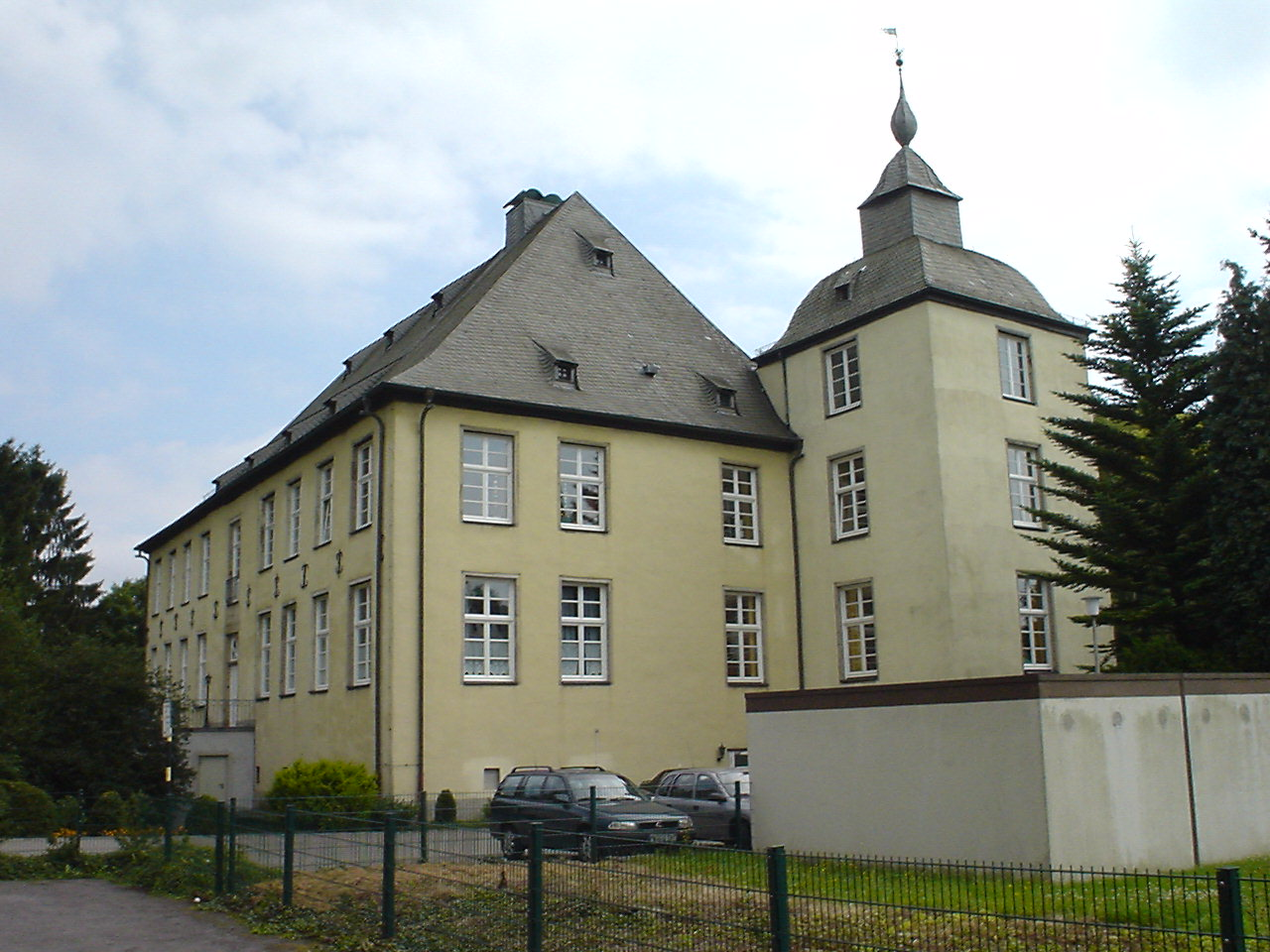
- Haus Hemer

- Coat of arms

- Location of Hemer within Märkischer Kreis district
- Interactive map of Hemer
- Location within Germany Location within North Rhine-Westphalia
- Coordinates: 51°23′N 07°46′E
- Country: Germany
- State: North Rhine-Westphalia
- Admin. region: Arnsberg
- District: Märkischer Kreis

Government
  - Mayor (2020–30): Christian Schweitzer (CDU)

Area
  - Total: 67.66 km^{2} (26.12 sq mi)
- Elevation: 208 m (682 ft)

Population (2025-12-31)
  - Total: 34,722
  - Density: 513.2/km^{2} (1,329/sq mi)
- Time zone: UTC+01:00 (CET)
  - Summer (DST): UTC+02:00 (CEST)
- Postal codes: 58675
- Dialling codes: 02372
- Vehicle registration: MK
- Website: www.hemer.de

Hemer (German pronunciation: [ˈheːmɐ]) is a town in the Märkischer Kreis district, in North Rhine-Westphalia, Germany.

== Geography ==
Hemer is located at the north end of the Sauerland near the Ruhr river. The highest elevation, at 546 metres (1,791 feet), is in the Balver Wald in the south of the city. The lowest elevation, at 160 metres (520 feet), is at the Edelburg in the northeast.

== History ==
Burial mounds show that around 1250 BC, Bronze Age shepherds and farmers lived in the area. Graves from the time of the Merovingian Franks around the year 650 were found near the present city centre.

Hemer was first mentioned in 1072 by its old name Hademare in a document of Anno II, Archbishop of Cologne, granting lands to the newly founded Benedictine Grafschaft Abbey, including St. Vitus's church and two farms, the later de:Haus Hemer and the de:Hedhof. In 1124 the parish of St. Vitus was separated from the parish of Menden.

Hemer remained an unimportant settlement without market rights, even when the Counts of the Mark gained independence from the episcopal state of Cologne in the 13th century, when Hemer found itself on the boundary of the two states. But despite the political insignificance of the Kirchspiel Hemer ("Hemer parish"), it was already quite densely settled, thanks to its location on the old road from the Rhineland to Middle Germany (now Bundesstrasse 7), and to the iron mining and smelting industries already developed here. The boundary with Cologne, formed by the valley of the Hönne river southeast of Hemer, was protected by Klusenstein Castle, built in 1353. Local government in the parish of Hemer was the responsibility of the "Amt" of Iserlohn until 1647, when it was transferred to the family of Wachtendonk, who owned Haus Hemer at that time.

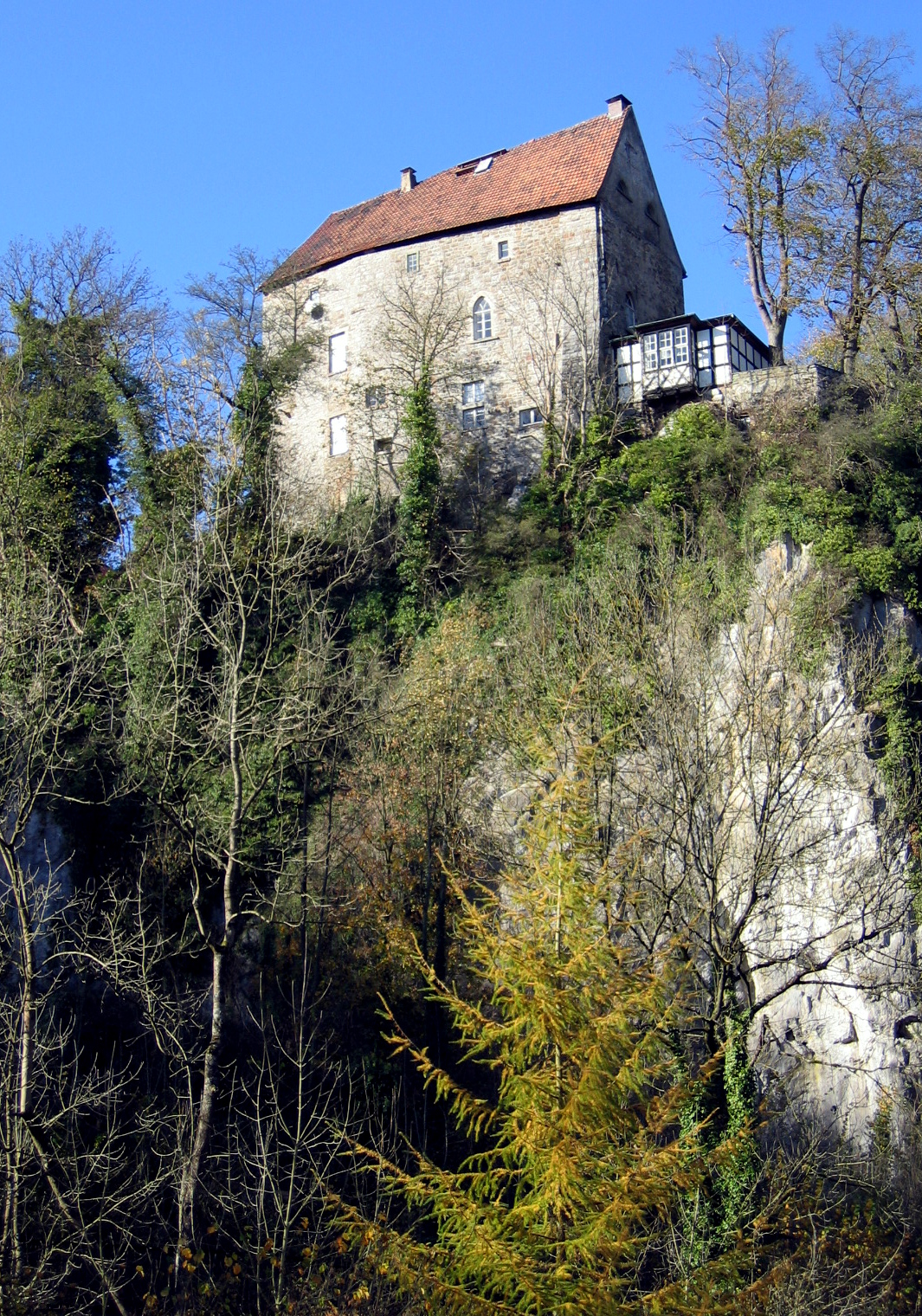
Klusenstein Castle

The Reformation reached Hemer in the second half of the 16th century, when the Church of St. Vitus (Hemer) (German: Vituskirche) became Protestant (it was demolished in 1818, and replaced by the new Ebbergkirche nearby, built in 1819/20). Between 1697 and 1700 Jobst Edmund of Brabeck, the bishop of Hildesheim and a relative of the new owners of Haus Hemer, built the church of Saints Peter and Paul in Baroque style as the new church for the Roman Catholics.

During the Napoleonic period Hemer was a "mairie" in the "arrondissement" of Hagen in the "département" of the Ruhr of the Napoleonic satellite Grand Duchy of Berg.

=== Creation of Amt Hemer ===
On October 31, 1841, the Amt Hemer was created by 14 municipalities previously administered by the Landbezirk Iserlohn. It originally consisted of the municipalities of de:Becke, de:Brockhausen, de:Calle, de:Deilinghofen, de:Evingsen, de:Frönsberg, de:Ihmert, de:Kesbern, de:Landhausen, de:Lössel, de:Niederhemer, de:Oberhemer, de:Sundwig and de:Westig, as well as the manors (Rittergut) of Edelburg, Haus Hemer and Klusenstein. The Amt was part of the Kreis Iserlohn. In 1910 Niederhemer and Oberhemer were merged into Hemer. In 1920 Lössel became part of the Amt Oestrich.

=== Communal reform of 1929 ===
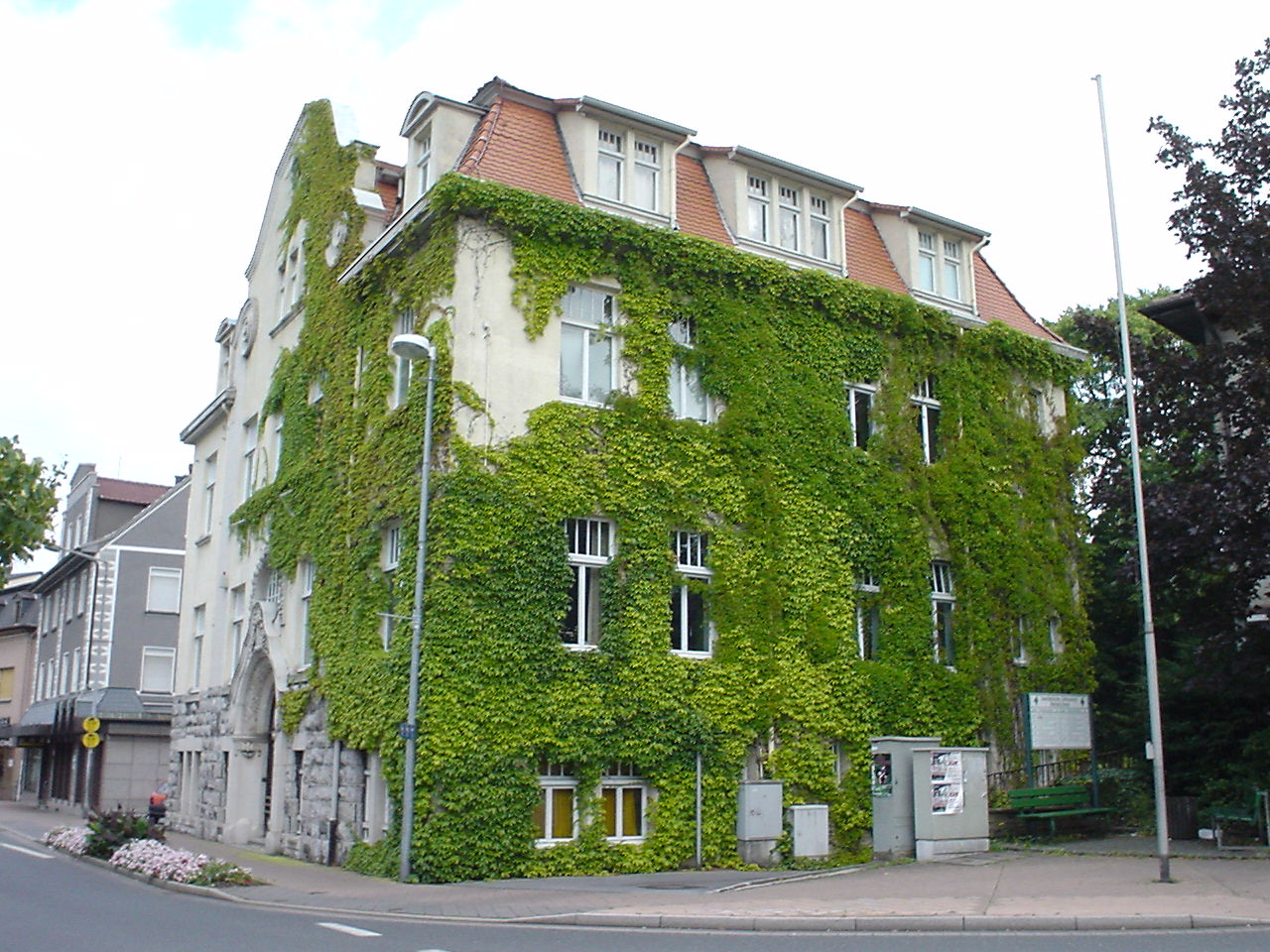
Old Amtshaus

The three industrial municipalities of Hemer, Sundwig and Westig had already grown into a single urban area by World War I. The idea of merging the three municipalities had already been mooted before the war, but due to the war it was not until 1920 that it was formally proposed. However, neither Sundwig nor Westig was initially enthusiastic and both later opposed the merger, mostly because the industrialists in the two places were worried that the tax rates would rise to the higher rates of Hemer. At the same time the city of Iserlohn unsuccessfully tried to incorporate several municipalities: Letmathe and Oestrich to the west, and also the industrial municipalities of the Amt Hemer. Because of the opposition, the merger of the three municipalities was delayed until 1929, when it was carried out by order of the Prussian Ministry of the Interior. At the same time the municipality of Calle was split into four parts: the northern Griesenbrauck was added to Landhausen; Bilveringsen passed to Hemer; the central part around Wermingsen was incorporated into Iserlohn; and the southern parts passed to Westig. With effect from August 1, 1929, Hemer, Sundwig and Westig, as well as Landhausen and the remains of Calle were merged, covering an area of 26.82 km^{2} (10.36 sq mi) and having a population of 13,809.

Also with effect from August 1, 1929, the municipality of Brockhausen was incorporated into Deilinghofen. The rural Brockhausen had only 588 inhabitants, and because of its low income was not considered to be financially viable as an independent unit.

On January 30, 1936, the municipality of Hemer received the right to call itself a city (Stadt).

=== Military ===
In 1934 Hemer became a garrison town. In January 1934 it was decided to build three barracks in neighboring Iserlohn, which however was unable also to provide enough free land for a training area. At a meeting in June, land around the village of Apricke was selected, of which 3 km^{2} was bought by the state in autumn of the same year. The hospital was also inspected and later acquired as a military hospital. This was very welcome to Hemer, as the hospital had turned out to be far too big and too expensive for the Amt, and in this way it was possible later to build a new smaller hospital.

In December 1934 temporary barracks for one battalion were also built in Hemer. On October 30, 1936, an official garrison contract between Hemer and the state was signed, which included the building of permanent barracks. Construction was still unfinished when World War II started in 1939, but was then rushed through and the buildings were reassigned as a prisoner of war camp, the Stalag VI-A.

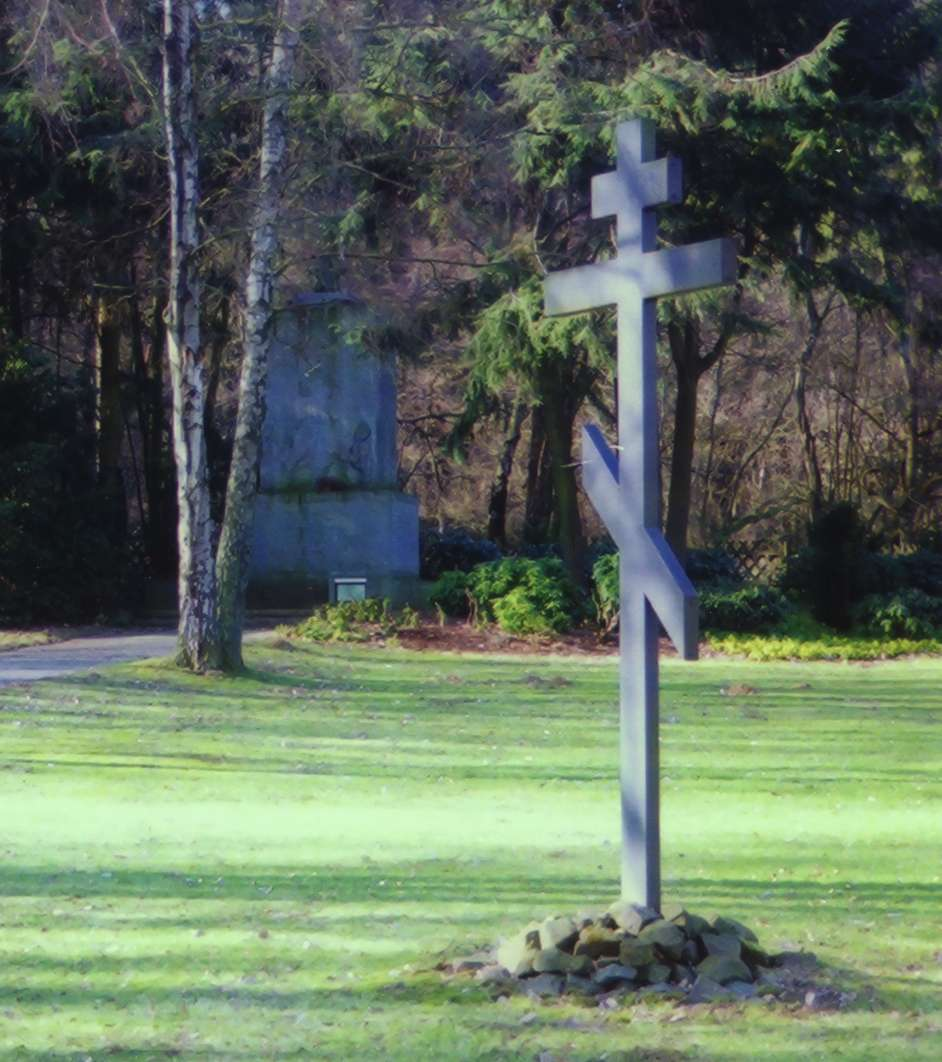
POW memorial in Hemer

The first Polish POWs arrived in October 1939, and had to sleep on the floor as the beds were still not finished. Inadequate equipment remained a problem throughout the whole of the war, both because the material was needed at the front, and also because the camp was permanently overpopulated. At first the inmates were mostly from Poland and France, but after the beginning of the war with the Soviet Union in 1941 Soviet POWs quickly became the majority.

It is estimated that during the six years of the war more than 200,000 inmates were held in the camp. Those who were capable of forced labour usually lived near their places of work, so the main camp was in a sense a "dying camp" for those who fell ill because of the bad living conditions and the hard labour. At an unconfirmed estimate, about 24,000 POWs were buried in Hemer. The fictional film Hart's War is set in the camp in early 1945.

After the war the barracks of the Stalag, renamed to Camp Roosevelt were at first used as a camp for detaining Nazi prisoners. In 1947, it was renamed Casernes Ardennes and were used by the Belgian army till 1955. After the establishment of the German Bundeswehr the barracks became home of a tank battalion in 1957. Originally simply named after its location on the Jüberg hill, it received its final name, Blücher-Kaserne, in 1964.

In 1953 Canadian troops moved into newly built barracks in Deilinghofen (Forts Macleod and Prince of Wales) as well as two former German barrack complexes in Iserlohn (Forts QuèAppelle and Beausejour). Canadian soldiers and their families resided in two separate locations in Hemer. The main location centered on Berliner Strasse where the school and community center were located. The secondary location centered on Bredde Strasse, the site that was formerly used by the Belgians. In 1970 the Canadian military was transferred to bases in the Black Forest Region (Baden-Baden and Lahr) and most of the former Canadian holdings, including Married Quarters in Hemer, were taken over by British military. In 1994 the British left and the Deilinghofen barracks were converted to civil use with the barracks in Iserlohn either transferred back to the Bundeswehr or also converted to civil use.

Due to the changing duties of the Bundeswehr, tanks are not needed as much as they were during the Cold War. The closure of the barracks was announced in 2004, and on January 23, 2007, the last soldiers left Hemer, 50 years after the Bundeswehr moved into the barracks.

=== Communal reform of 1975 ===
With the reorganization of the districts and municipalities in 1974 the Amt was dissolved. Evingsen had already become part of Altena in 1969. In 1974 Kesbern became part of Iserlohn, while the other municipalities of Becke, Deilinghofen, Frönsberg and Ihmert were added to the town of Hemer.

=== Municipalities as of 1904 ===
- Becke - consisting of the settlements (Wohnplätze) Brelen, Edelburg, Höcklingsen, Mesterscheid, Oese, Urbecke. Area 5.50 km^{2} (2.12 sq mi), population 501.
- Brockhausen - Apricke, Bäingsen, Brockhausen, Grevenborn, Im Hagen, Hönnetal, Klusenstein, Riemke. Area 9.29 km^{2} (3.59 sq mi), population 526.
- Calle - Bilveringsen, Bredenbruch, zur Calle, Düingsen, Franzberg, Griesenbrauck, Magney, Schleddenhof, Wermingsen. Area 8.59 km^{2} (3.32 sq mi), population 900.
- Deilinghofen - Bautenheide, Deilinghofen, Habichtseil, Hembecke, Hohenstein, Langenbruch, Nierungsen. Area 9.68 km^{2} (3.74 sq mi), population 1124.
- Evingsen - Evingsen, Giebel, Heide, Heidermühle, Heidersiepen, Hüingsen, auf der Hütte, Kohlberg, Löttringsen, Löttringserhahn, Nettenscheid, Rüssenberg, Schwarzpaul, Springen, Stodt, Tüssenberg. Area 6.97 km^{2} (2.69 sq mi), population 1049.
- Frönsberg - Beckmerhagen, Drubbelhelle, Ebberg, Frönsberg, Heppingsen, Heppingserbach, Hestern, Hültershagen, Ispei, Rohland, Stephanopel, Wachmecke, Winterhof. Area 6.03 km^{2} (2.33 sq mi), population 323.
- Ihmert - Bredenbruch, Dieckgraben, Elfenfohren, Hasberg, Holmecke, Ihmert, Ihmerterbach, Ihmerterort, Johannistal, Rottmecke, Stemmessiepen, Stümpen, Sülberg, Tüttebelle, Westendorf. Area 9.00 km^{2} (3.47 sq mi), population 987.
- Kesbern - Attern, Bräke, Oberdahlsen, Niederdahlsen, Eichholz, Eileringsen, Gunzenheide, im Hagen, Hardorn, Hegenscheid, vorm Hey, Kesbern, Lohsiepen, Lennenstück, Meerbrauck, Osthelle, im Schlaa, Siepen, Voswinkel, Wixberg. Area 13.40 km^{2} (5.17 sq mi), population 552.
- Landhausen - Krebsbach (Tannenberg), Landhausen, Stübecken. Area 5.12 km^{2} (1.98 sq mi), population 338.
- Lössel - Bühle, Dümpel, Düsternsiepen, Emberg, Großenstück, Häken, Heide, Hilkenhohl, Langenstück, Liehard, Lieth, Lössel, Lüsecken, Mooskamp, Pillingsen, Pillingserbach, Roden, Roland, Saat, Schmidthacke, Schorhelle, Selberg, Sieschotte, Silbering, Stümpen, Stübke, am Ühler. Area 6.86 km^{2} (2.65 sq mi), population 1214.
- Niederhemer - Haus Hemer, Niederhemer, Rosenhoff. Area 3.15 km^{2} (1.22 sq mi), population 2477.
- Oberhemer - area 3.43 km^{2} (1.32 sq mi), population 2,524.
- Sundwig - Dieken, Eichenufer (Eickenufer), Grüntal (Grünental), Siegeloh, Sundwig, Sundwigerbach, Wenhagen. Area 6.23 km^{2} (2.41 sq mi), population 1,383.
- Westig - Westig, Westigerbach, Westigerkreuz. Area 4.11 km^{2} (1.59 sq mi), population 1,756.

=== List of mayors ===
Until 1995 the mayor was an honorary post with only formal duties, while the actual head of administration was the Stadtdirektor. This system was introduced in 1946 by the British military government, and was abolished in 1999. However, when Reiner Hermann was forced to resign in 1994, shortly after the new system was adopted, Hemer became the first commune of North Rhine-Westphalia to get a professional mayor in 1995.

Mayors
- Christian Schweitzer (CDU) - since 2020
- Michael Heilmann (UWG) - 2016–2020
- Michael Esken (CDU) - July 24, 2003 - 2015
- Heinz Öhmann (CDU) - March 30, 1995 till March 17, 2003
- Doris Ebbing (CDU) - 1994–1995
- Klaus Burda (SPD) - 1987–1994
- Hans Meyer (CDU) - 1975–1987
- Werner Beckmann (FDP) - 1975 (provisional)
- Hans Meyer (CDU) - 1969–1974
- Fredi Camminadi (SPD) - 1961–1969
- Karl Bode (FDP) - 1956–1961
- Josef Hesse (Zentrum) - 1952–1956
- Josef Kleffner (CDU) - 1949–1952
- Rudolf Maiworm (SPD) - 1948–1949
- Hermann Arendt (SPD) - 1946–1948
- Heinz Hoose (SPD) - 1945–1946
- Josef Kleffner (Zentrum) - 1945
- Wilhelm Langemann (independent, later NSDAP) - 1934–1945
- Rudolf Löbbecke (NSDAP) - 1933–1934
- Otto Renzig (DVP) - 1929–1933
- Fritz Clarfeld (DVP/DNVP) - 1919–1929
- Heinrich Grünewald - 1912–1919
- Hermann Trump - 1910–1912
Stadtdirektor
- Reiner Hermann - 1990–1994
- Dieter Voss - 1966–1990
- Wolfgang Kreft - 1965–1966
- Heinz Hoose - 1946–1964
  - deputized by Richard Ebeling 1949–1956
  - deputized by Ernst Liene 1960–1964

== Population ==
Historical population

Year	Pop.	±% p.a.
1965	32,399	—
1970	33,948	+0.94%
1975	33,492	−0.27%
1980	32,735	−0.46%
1985	31,445	−0.80%
1990	34,412	+1.82%
1995	35,934	+0.87%

Year	Pop.	±% p.a.
2000	37,156	+0.67%
2005	37,932	+0.41%
2010	37,735	−0.10%
2015	33,535	−2.33%
2020	33,863	+0.19%
2025	34,722	+0.50%

Source: Landesdatabank Nordrhein-Westfalen

== Religion ==
As of 2005, 15.982 citizens were Protestants, 11,998 Roman Catholic, and 10,111 have other or no religion.

Five Roman Catholic parishes are located in the city - St. Peter and Paul (Niederhemer, Becke), Christ König (Stadtmitte), St. Peter Canisius (Westig), St. Mary (Bredenbruch, Ihmert) and St. Bonifatius (Sundwig, Deilinghofen). All five parishes work together in a parish cluster (Pastoralverbund). They are member of the deanery Märkisches Sauerland within the Archdiocese of Paderborn.

== Points of interest ==
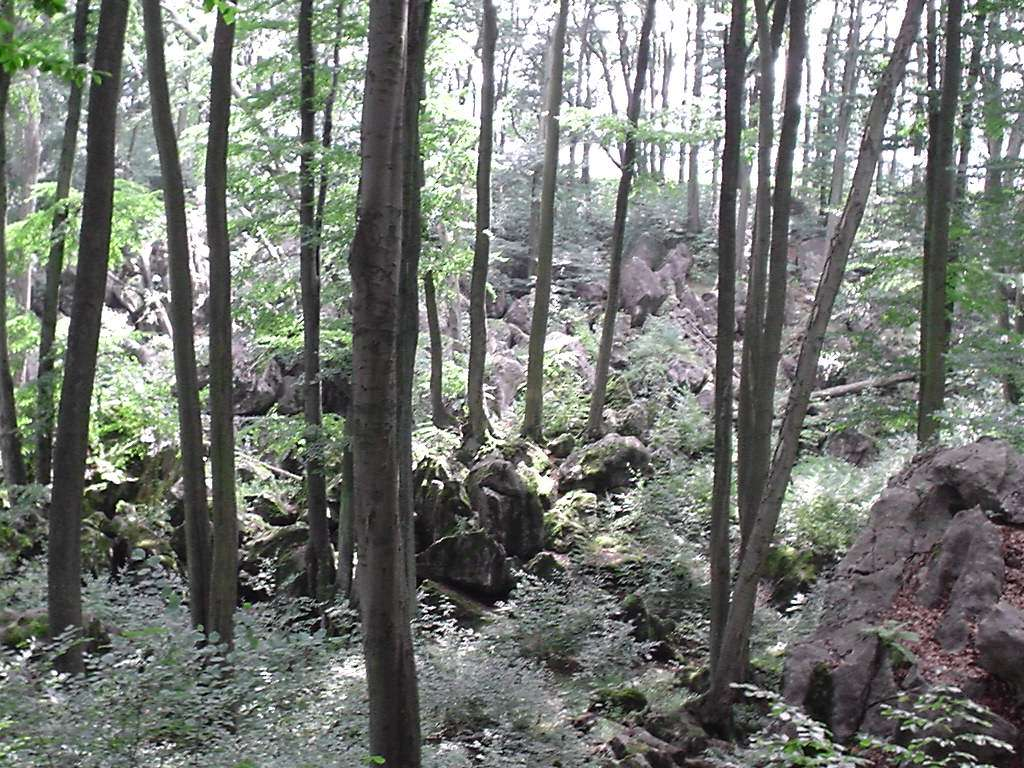
Felsenmeer

The Heinrichshöhle is a Devonian limestone cave in Hemer, officially discovered in 1812, but probably known by locals long before. 470m of the cave system are accessible to visitors, with some stalactites and the skeleton of a cave bear on display.

The Felsenmeer nearby is a small Karst area, partially created by medieval mining, now located in a beech forest.

Shared with Menden and Balve is the Hönnetal, a narrow valley with cliffs carved into the same limestone bedrock by the river Hönne.

== Coat of arms ==
The three golden wolf-hooks are derived from the arms of the Brabeck family, the owners of the manor Haus Hemer. The red and white fess on the left side is derived from the arms of the Counts of the Mark. The current coat of arms of the city was originally used by the Amt, but when the Amt was dissolved into the city in 1975 the city adopted it. It was chosen because it was heraldically and esthetically more satisfying, but also because the adoption of the coat of arms of the Amt symbolized the fact that the enlarged city continues the tradition of the Amt. The coat of arms was officially granted on March 16, 1976.

Former coat of arms of the city

The former coat of arms of the city used the same heraldic elements, but in a different arrangement. The red and white motif was used in the form of a bordure round the whole shield, which was completely black with the three yellow wolf-hooks in the middle. This coat of arms was granted by the president of the province of Westphalia on January 14 (Amt) and January 15 (city) 1936.

In 1926 the municipality of Hemer was already planning the creation of a coat of arms. A draft using industrial symbols was made by Treude, but the director of the Prussian state archive in Münster, Professor Ludwig Schmitz-Kallenberg, advised against it. Instead he suggested two designs using the heraldic elements of families of Brabeck and of the Counts of the Mark. Hemer created new drafts using heraldic elements from the arms of previous owners of Haus Hemer (the families Overlacker and Wachtendonck), but in 1928 the topic was discontinued. When it was restarted in the 1930s the original suggestion of Professor Johannes Bauermann of the Prussian state archive was followed, with final artwork by the herald Waldemar Mallek.

In 1939 the other municipalities of the Amt also received coats of arms. All six took the three wolf-hooks as their common symbol, showing their membership in the Amt. Becke, Deilinghofen and Frönsberg combined them with coats of arms of former noble families of the municipality, while Evingsen, Ihmert and Kesbern combined them with symbols representing their main industries - shoe making for Evingsen, wire production for Ihmert and agriculture for Kesbern.

See also: Coat of arms in the Amt Hemer

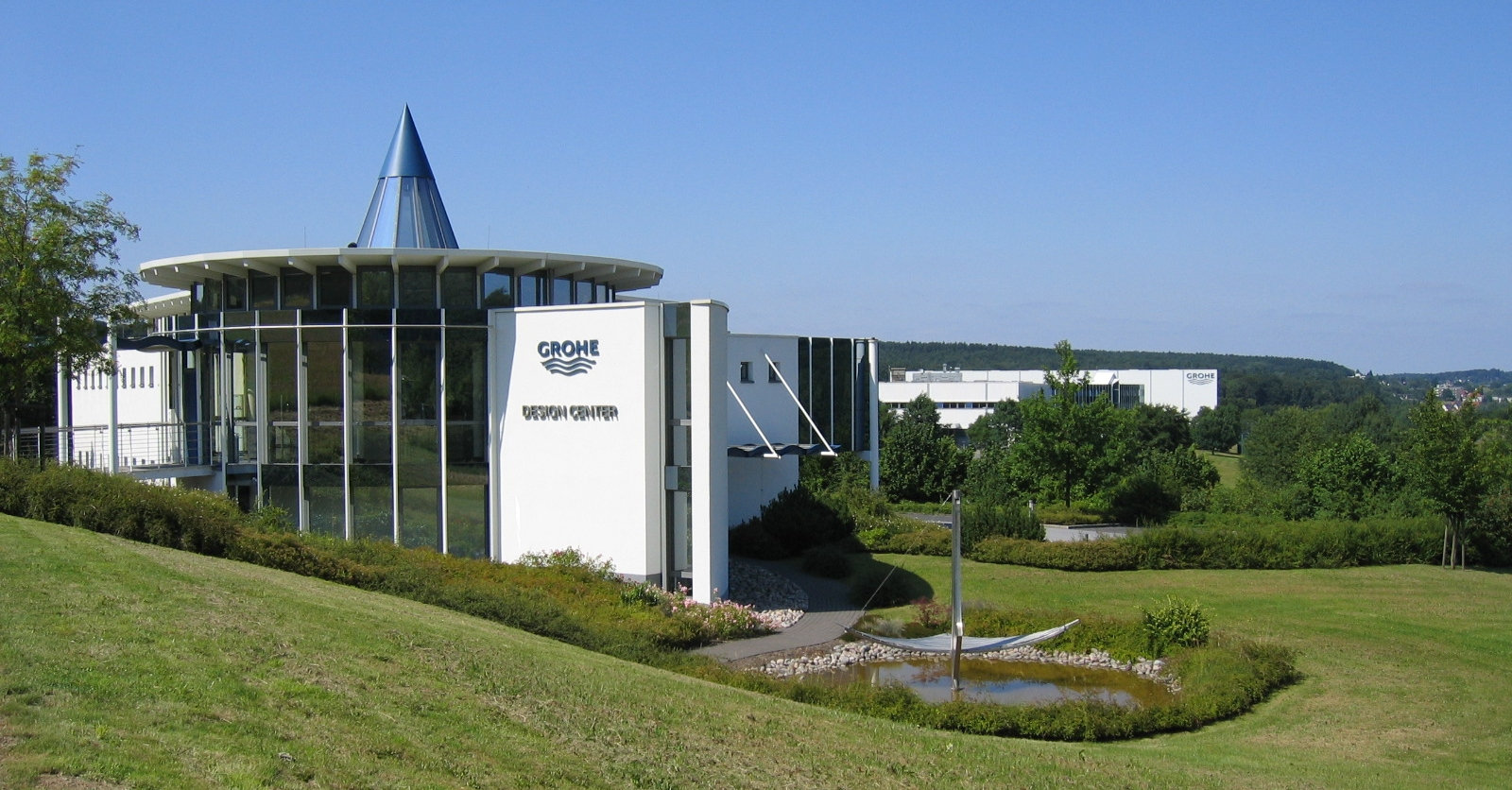
Grohe

== Economics ==
Like most of the northern part of the present Märkischer Kreis, Hemer has a long industrial history. The most important industries in the beginning of the 20th century were wire production and wire manufacturing industries, but also rolling mills, foundries and machine production. Paper production was already declining at that time. In 1927 Hemer and Ihmert together had 27 wire factories - 23.7% of all wire factories in Germany at that time. However, as the factories were rather small the percentage is much less impressive when compared by number of employees.

Hemer was the home of Clarfeld & Springmeyer, founded by Friedrich Clarfeld and Heinrich Springmeyer ca. 1870. In 1931, the name of the firm changed to Clarfeld & Co. KG. They were producers of silver and silverplated tableware into the 1970s.

During the Great Depression as well as in the final part of World War II many companies went into bankruptcy, but even today the industrial sector is above average in Hemer. The worldwide known fittings producers Grohe and Keuco are based in Hemer.

== Transport ==
Hemer is located on autobahn 46, which has ended in the Iserlohn quarter of Bilveringsen just at the border of the Hemer since 1976. The connection with another section of the A46 at Arnsberg has been delayed ever since, as the original route was supposed to go through a nature reserve in Menden.

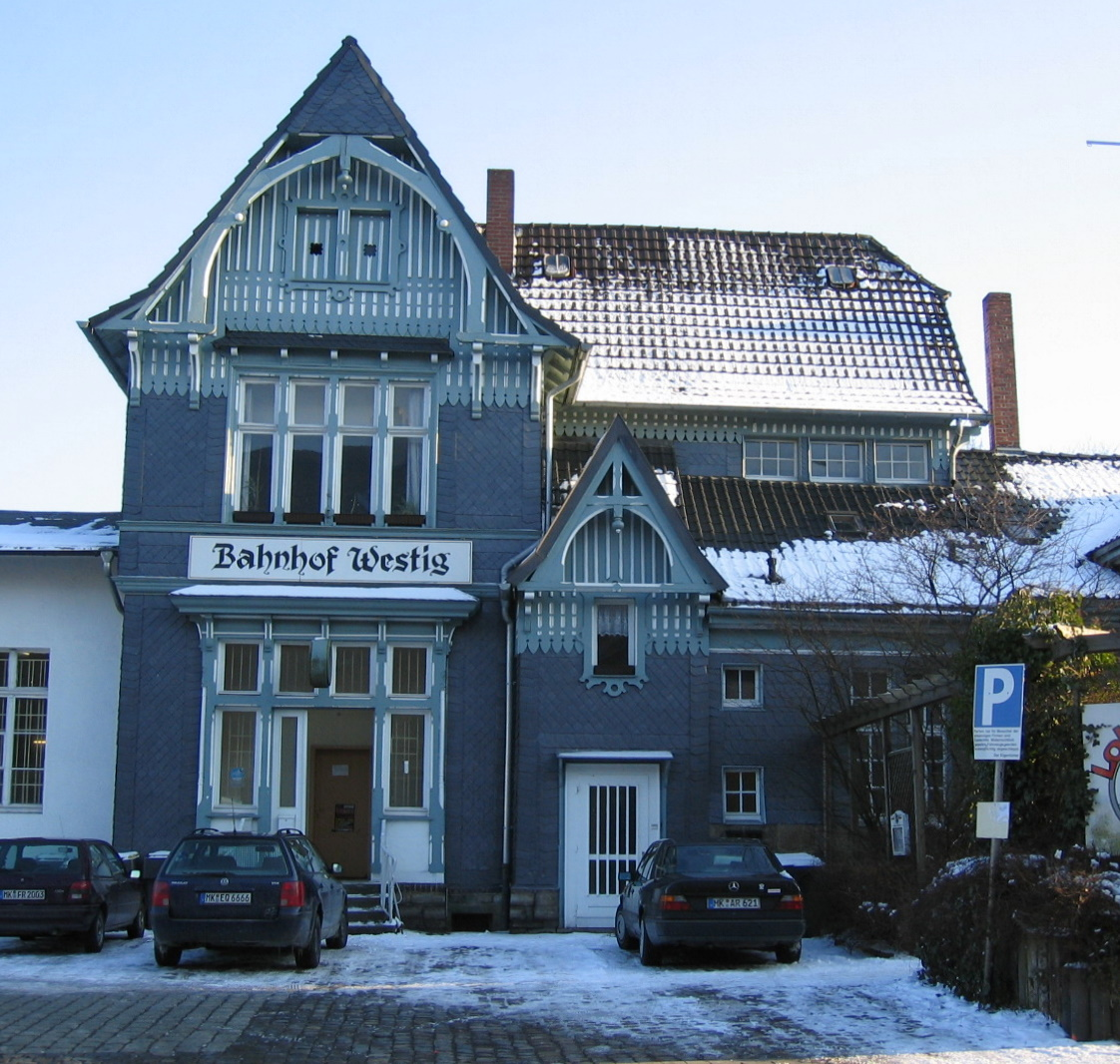
Former train station Hemer-Westig

Hemer was connected to the railway system on 1 September 1882, when the line from Menden to Hemer was inaugurated. In 1885 the extension to Iserlohn was opened. In 1891 a short track was built as far as Sundwig; it was originally planned that this should be extended to Neuenrade but the extension was never built. Hemer had two railway stations - one in Oberhemer and one in Westig. Because of a significant decline both in passenger numbers and in quantity of goods traffic, the service was wound up, and the last regular train went through Hemer on 27 May 1989. The track to Iserlohn was taken up, while the track to Menden was thereafter only used by the Bundeswehr for transporting their tanks and this traffic ended in 2006.

Besides the regular railway, a narrow-gauge railway using 1,000 mm (3 ft 3 3/8 in) gauge first reached a municipality of the Amt Hemer in 1909, when Buchenwäldchen (Calle) was connected with Iserlohn. It was quickly extended: in 1913 almost all the municipalities of Hemer were connected to the network of the Westfälische Kleinbahnen AG. The railway was used both for a tram and for goods transport, with the railway station at Westig serving as the junction between the narrow-gauge and the regular-gauge railway.

Renamed Iserlohner Kreisbahn AG in 1942, operations were only briefly interrupted after World War II. In the 1950s however more and more sections of the narrow-gauge railway had to be closed because they were no longer profit-making. The trams were replaced by buses, and trucks made the goods transport obsolete. In 1964 the goods transfer in Westig was closed; the trams had already closed in 1959.

== Twin towns – sister cities ==
Hemer is twinned with:

- Beuvry, France (1968)
- Bretten, Germany (1979)
- Doberlug-Kirchhain, Germany (1991)
- Obervellach, Austria (1985)
- Shchyolkovo, Russia (1992)
- Steenwerck, France (1967)

== Notable people ==
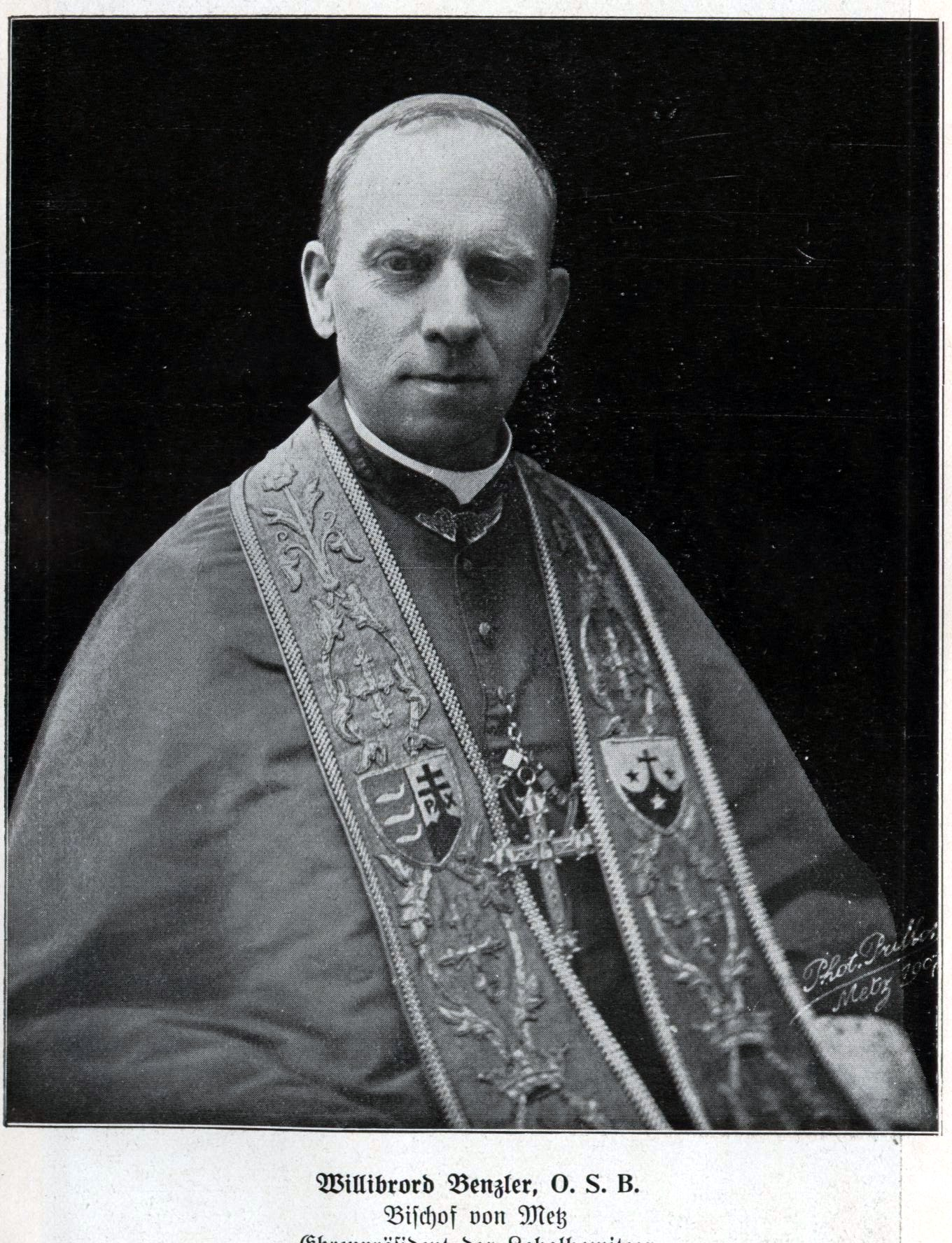
Bishop Willibrord Benzler

- Willibrord Benzler (1853–1921), long-term bishop of Metz
- Hans Prinzhorn (1886–1933), psychiatrist and art historian, pioneer in the analysis of psychological images
- Heinz-Dieter Ebbinghaus (born 1939), mathematician at the Albert-Ludwigs-University Freiburg
- Heinz Weifenbach (1939–2015), ice hockey executive
- Wolfgang Becker (born 1954), film director, gained his high school diploma at the Friedrich-Leopold-Woeste-Gymnasium
- Thomas Schäfer (1966−2020), lawyer and politician, Minister of Finance in Hesse
- Enno Poppe (born 1969), composer and conductor
- Michael Jeltsch (born 1969), biochemistry researcher and professor
- Christian Hommel (born 1981), ice hockey player
- Hendrik Sirringhaus (born 1985), ice hockey player
- Lean Bergmann (born 1998), ice hockey player

== Literature ==
- Stopsack, Hans-Hermann (ed., for the Volkshochschule Menden-Hemer-Balve): Hemer 1944–1949. Erinnnerungen, Zeitzeugenberichte und Dokumente aus einer Zeit des Umbruchs. Self-published, Menden/Hemer 2004.
- Stopsack, Hans-Hermann: Vom Amt zur Stadt. Zur Geschichte von Amt und Stadt Hemer von 1900 bis zur Gegenwart. Self-published, Hemer 2000. ISBN 3-00-006685-3
- Thomas, Eberhard; Fischer, Klaus: Hemer. Stadt-Bild-Verlag, Leipzig 1996. ISBN 3-931554-12-0
- Stopsack, Hans-Hermann; Thomas, Eberhard (eds., for the town of Hemer and the Volkshochschule Menden-Hemer-Balve): Stalag VI A Hemer. Kriegsgefangenenlager 1939–1945. Eine Dokumentation. Hemer 1995.
