= Klusenstein Castle =

Caste in Hemer, Germany

Coordinates: 51°22′51″N 7°51′03″E

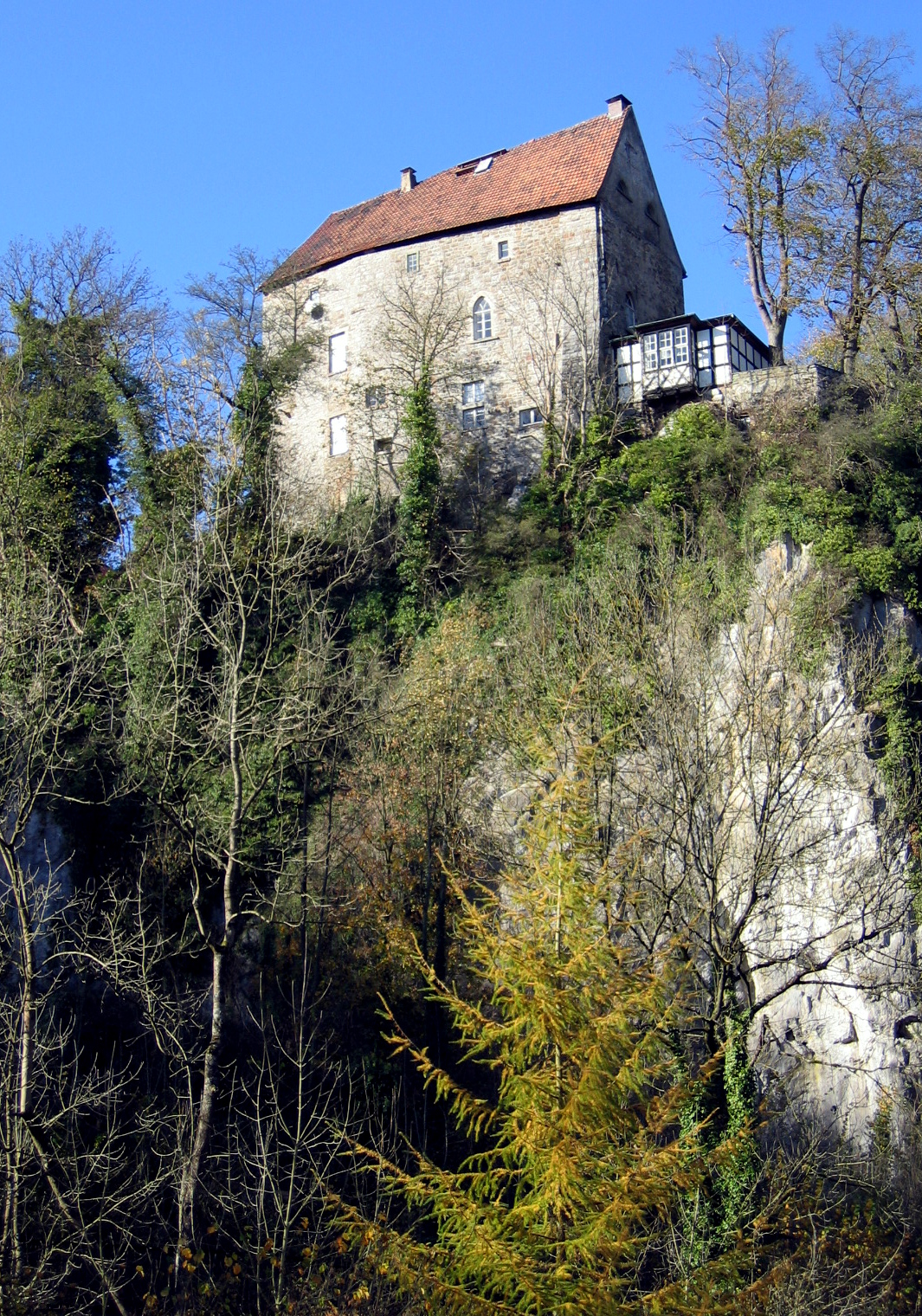
View from valley to the south

Klusenstein is a castle in Hemer, Germany, located on a 60m high cliff above the valley of the Hönne river. The castle was built in 1353 as a boundary fortification of the earldom Mark.

== History ==
The castle was built in 1353 by Gerhard of Plettenberg, a vassal of earl Engelbrecht III of the Mark. Levold of Northof (1279-1359?), the chronicler of earl Engelbrecht, wrote

In denseluen jair, als die vurs. Greue Engelbrecht auer Meer reysden, beghan Gerit van Plettenbrecht in afwesen des Greuen dat Slot ind Stat to nyenraide in Suderlande to tymmeren ind oick Slot ten Cluysensteyn.

which translates to

In the year when Earl Engelbrecht was traveling beyond the sea, Gerit of Plettenberg in the absence of his earl began to build the castle and town of Neuenrade in the Sauerland, as well as the castle of Klusenstein.

The castle formed the boundary fortification of the earldom Mark to the bishopric state of Cologne and the earldom Arnsberg. All three territories met at the Hönne river valley, the castle was also overlooking an old road crossing the valley. During the feud between earl Engelbert and Gottfried IV of Arnsberg, the castle was under siege in 1366 but did not fall.

When the last Earl of Arnsberg, Gottfried IV, sold the earldom to the bishop of Cologne, the castle lost its importance. Until the 17th century, the family of Werminghausen owned the castle. During the 30 years war (1618–48) both Swedish and Hessian troops stayed in the castle. In 1695 the Brabeck family bought the castle and sold it in 1812 to the Löbbecke family. In 1904 it was sold to the Hoesch company, and now belongs to the company Rheinkalk.

For the 650th anniversary in 2003 the castle and the adjoining buildings were renovated.

== Etymology ==
The origin of the name Klusenstein isn't fully known. While the second part stein simply means rock, the word Kluse may either refer to a rift in the rock, or alternatively from the dialect word for hermitage.

== Location ==
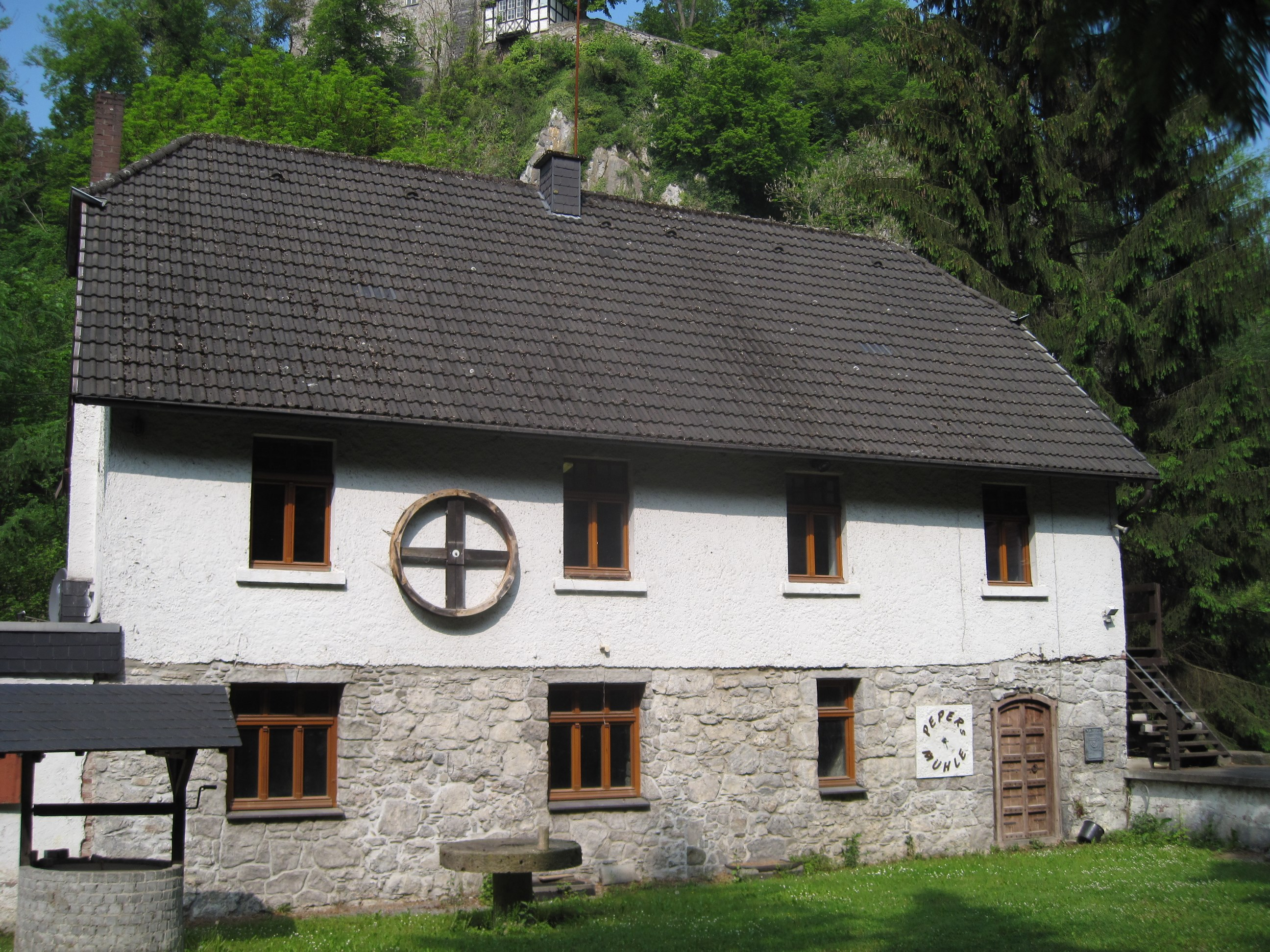
Klusenstein mill

The castle is located on a 60m high cliff over the Hönne river valley, at around the narrowest part of the valley. At the bottom of the rock is a small cave in total 51m long. One corridor bends upward, but about 30m below the plateau it is blocked by stones. There were legends about a secret escape route out of the castle, in 2003 the top entrance to the cave was found below the eastern palais destroyed in 1840.

Below the castle is a mill named Klusenstein mill, though it did not belong to the castle. Since 1912 the railway connecting Balve and Menden runs directly below the castle.
