= Menden (Sauerland) station =

Railway station in Menden (Sauerland), Germany

Menden (Sauerland)
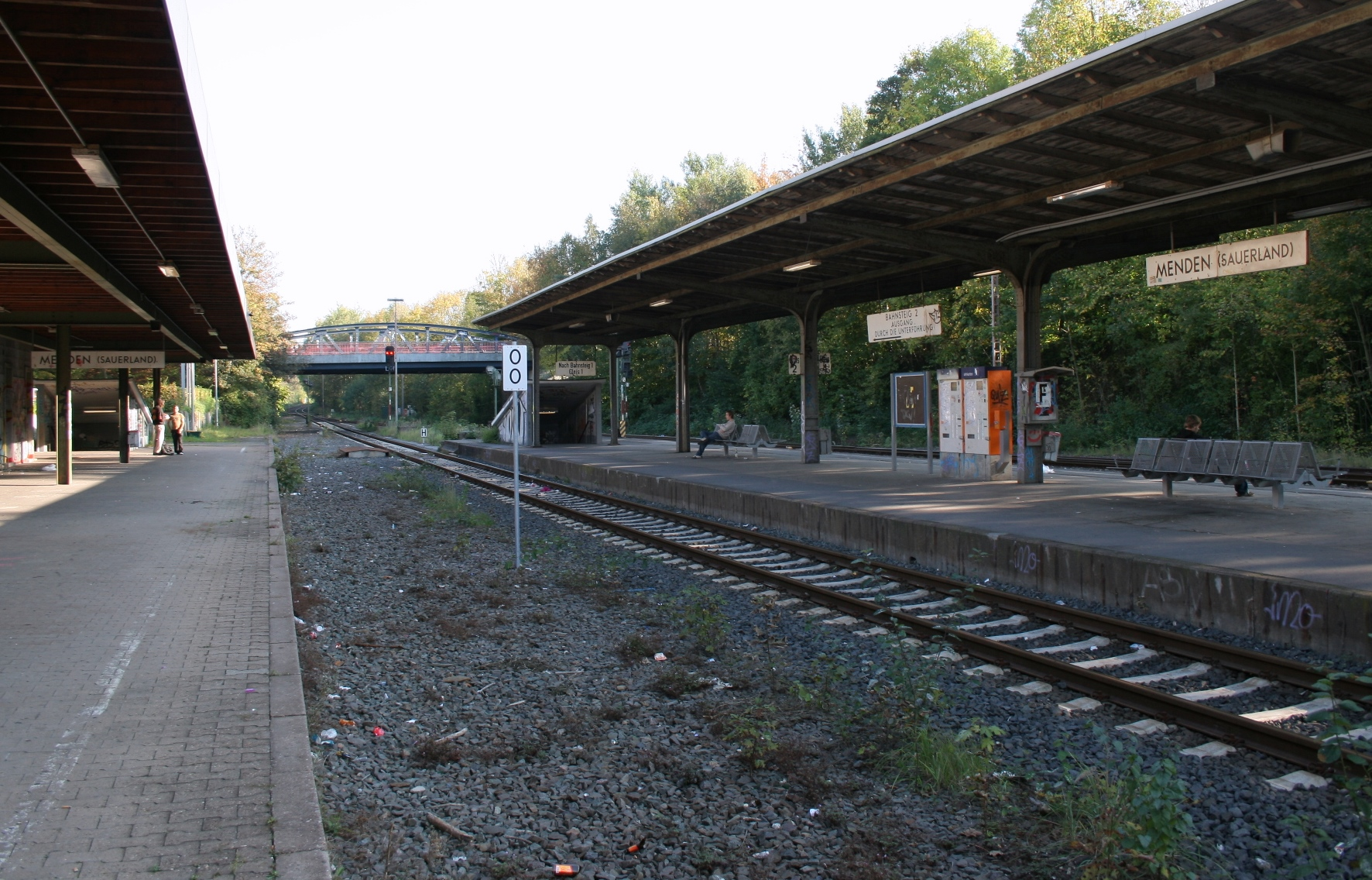
- Platforms in 2007

General information
- Location: Menden (Sauerland), NRW; Germany
- Coordinates: 51°26′08″N 7°47′33″E
- Line: Hönne Valley Railway (KBS 437)
- Platforms: 2

Construction
- Accessible: Yes

Other information
- Station code: 4053
- DS100 code: EMED
- IBNR: 8003967
- Category: 6
- Fare zone: Westfalentarif: 48171
- Website: www.bahnhof.de

History
- Opened: 7 August 1872

Services
Preceding station	DB Regio NRW	Following station
Bösperde towards Unna	RB 54	Menden (Sauerland) Süd towards Neuenrade
Location

Menden (Sauerland) station is a railway station in the town of Menden (Sauerland) in the German state of North Rhine-Westphalia and is served by the Hönnetal-Bahn. It is located southwest of the town centre on the Hönne. The station was built in 1872.

== Station area ==
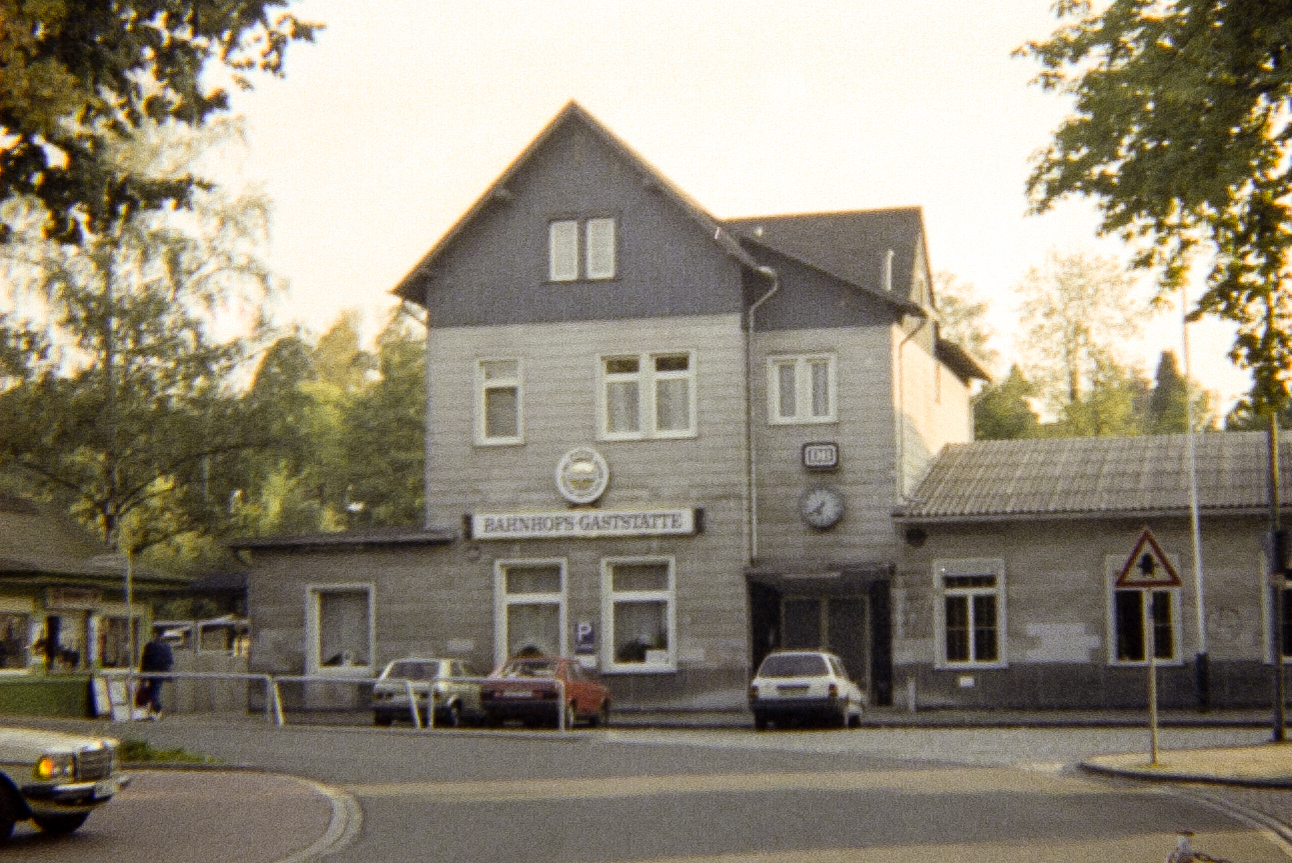
Original station building in the mid-1980s

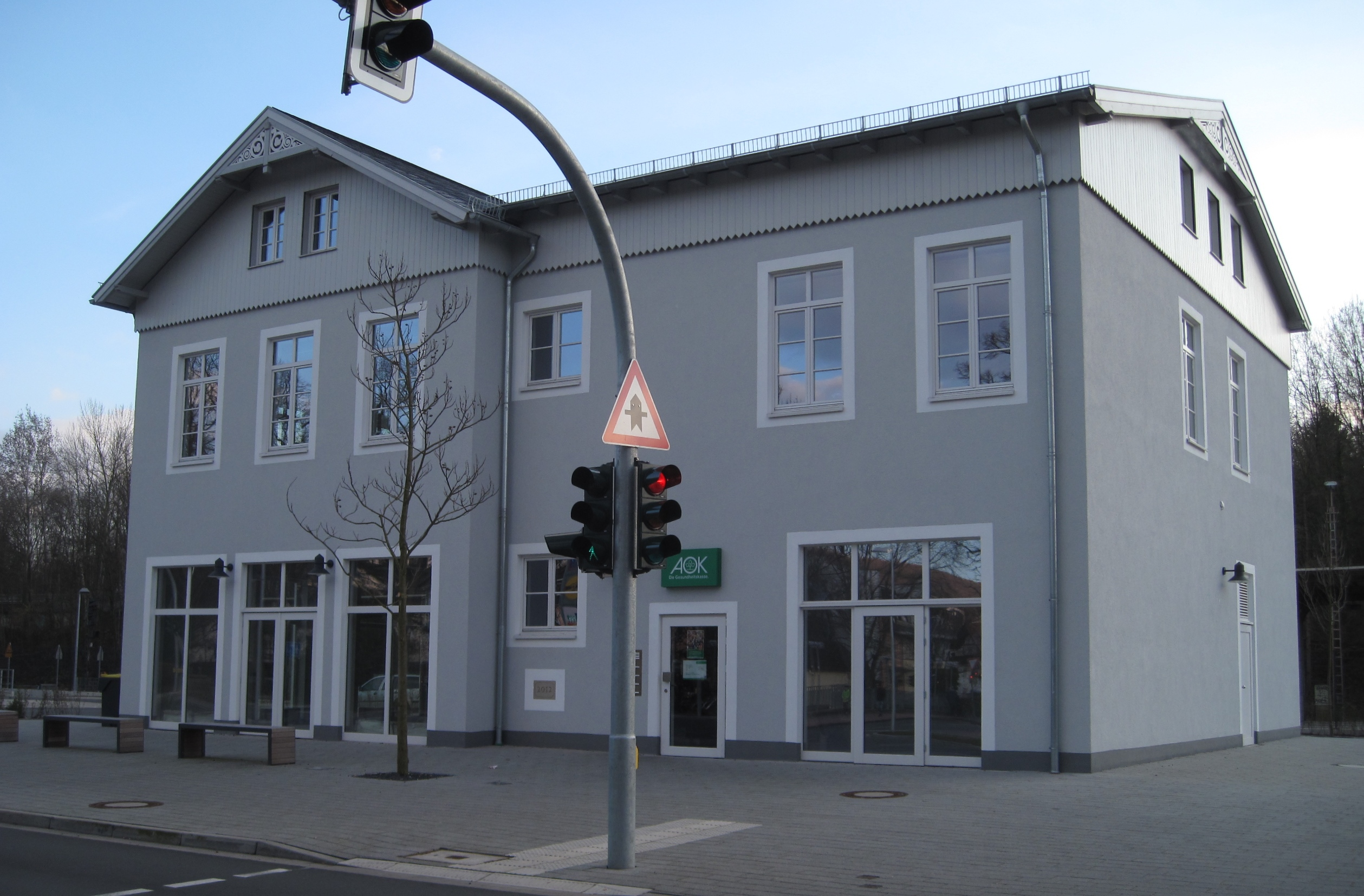
Replacement building from 2012

The station complex once included a kiosk, a restaurant, a ticketing hall and facilities for handling baggage and clearing freight. Freight services to the station were discontinued in 1989, and the last ticketing counter closed in 2001.

The building then stood unused and fell into disrepair. It was purchased by an investor in 2009, and plans for the redevelopment of the site were discussed.

After some delays, the original buildings were finally torn down and visually similar building was constructed on the site in 2012. The new building is used by various businesses and is no longer related to the railway.

== Rail services ==
The station is currently served by one Regionalbahn line:

Line	Line name	Route	Interval (Mon-Fri)	Interval (Sat-Sun)
RB 54	Hönnetal-Bahn	Unna – Fröndenberg – Menden (Sauerland) – Balve – Neuenrade	60	60 / 120

=== Buses ===
Several urban and regional bus services run from the station forecourt and the streets of Westwall and Walramstraße.

Line	Richtung (direction A / direction B)	Interval (in mins.)
1	Hagen/Hohenlimburg	30
S3	Iserlohn station	60
21	Lendringsen / Platte Heide	30
22	Hüingsen / Iserlohn station	30
23	Fröndenberg Mitte	60
27	Unna station	60
