= Sirringhaus =

Sirringhaus is a surname. Notable people with the surname include:

- Henning Sirringhaus, British scientist and academic
- Hendrik Sirringhaus (born 1985), German ice hockey goaltender
