= Jeltsch =

Jeltsch is a surname. Notable people with the surname include:

- Anton Saurma von der Jeltsch, German aristocrat and diplomat
- Finn Jeltsch (born 2006), German footballer
- Michael Jeltsch, German-Finnish biochemist
