= Bieberbach =

Bieberbach may refer to:

- Ludwig Bieberbach, German mathematician
- Bieberbach (Egloffstein), a village in the municipality Egloffstein, Bavaria, Germany
- Bieberbach (Feuchtwangen), a village in the municipality Feuchtwangen, Bavaria, Germany
- Bieberbach (Sonnefeld), a village in the municipality Sonnefeld, Bavaria, Germany
- Bieberbach (Hönne), a river in North Rhine-Westphalia, Germany
