= Affeln =

Village in North Rhine-Westphalia, Germany

- Ortsteil of Neuenrade
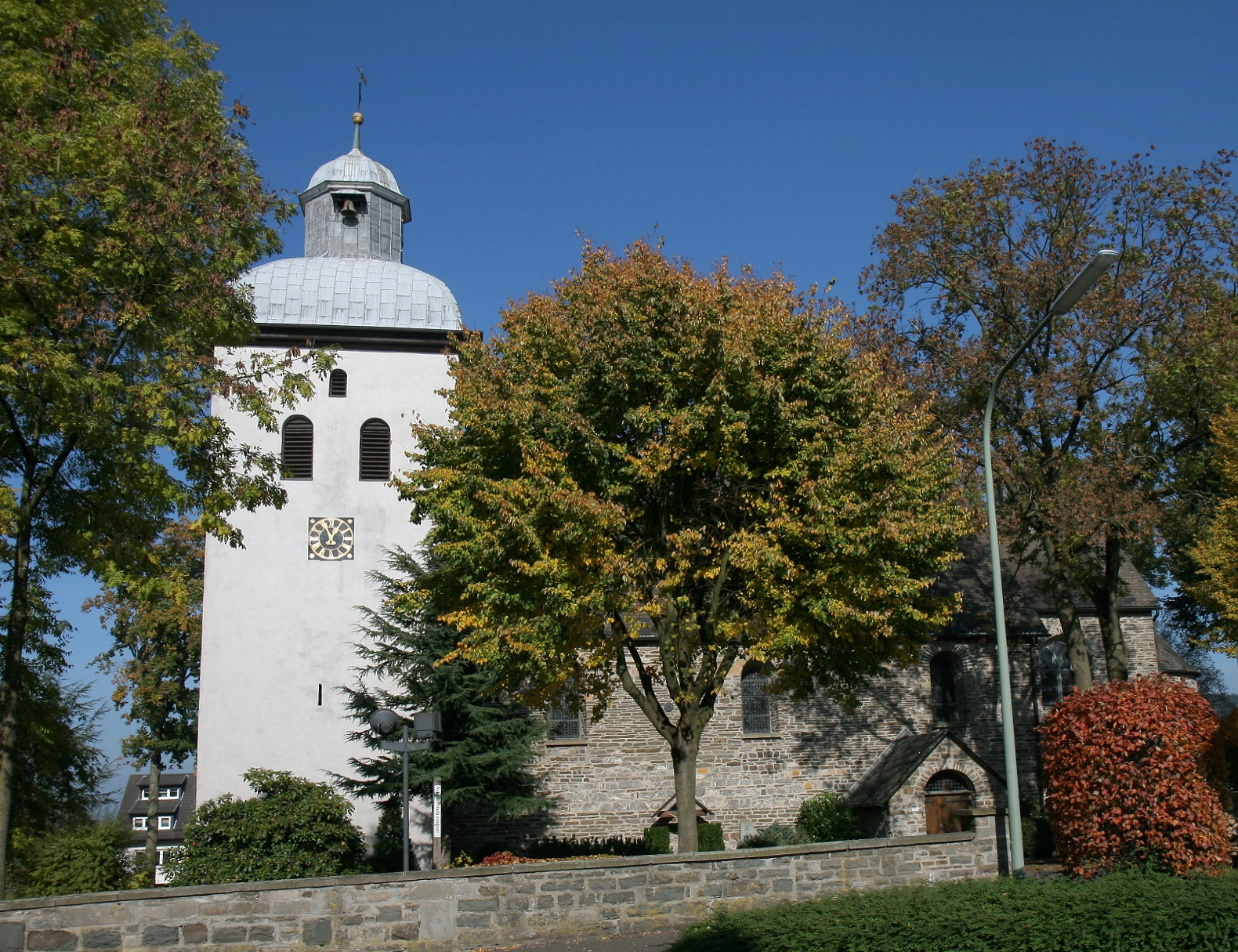
- Village church

- Coat of arms
- Interactive map of Affeln
- Location within Germany Location within North Rhine-Westphalia
- Coordinates: 51°16′27.76″N 7°51′25.91″E
- Country: Germany
- State: North Rhine-Westphalia
- Admin. region: Arnsberg
- District: Märkischer Kreis
- Municipality: Neuenrade

Area
  - Total: 11.41 km^{2} (4.41 sq mi)

Population
  - Total: 760
  - Density: 67/km^{2} (170/sq mi)
- Time zone: UTC+01:00 (CET)
  - Summer (DST): UTC+02:00 (CEST)
- Postal codes: 58809
- Dialling codes: 02392, 02394
- Vehicle registration: MK

Affeln is a German village in Neuenrade, a municipality in Märkischer Kreis, North Rhine-Westphalia. Before 1975 it was considered an autonomous municipality.

== Geography ==
It is located in Homert Natural Park in the east of Neuenrade and in north of Plettenberg.

== Traditions ==
- Schützenfest

== See also ==
- Neuenrade
- Küntrop
