= Coats of arms in the Amt Hemer =

Old coat of arms of the town Hemer

After the city and the Amt Hemer were granted coat of arms in 1936, all of the remaining municipalities in the Amt received coat of arms until 1939. The municipalities which were no longer independent at that time did not receive coat of arms - Brockhausen was incorporated into Deilinghofen; Landhausen, Sundwig and Westig were incorporated into Hemer; Calle was split between Iserlohn and Hemer. Lössel had left the Amt in 1920 already, and thus did not receive a coat of arms at that time either.

All of the coat of arms expired when the Amt was dissolved in 1975, only the coat of arms of Evingsen expired already in 1969 when Evingsen was incorporated into Altena. Even though the coat of arms are no longer used officially, the communities in the former municipalities continue to use them unofficially. All coat of arms display three wolf hooks as the symbol of the Brabeck family. The common symbol was chosen to show the membership in the Amt.

== Hemer and Amt Hemer ==
Description see: Hemer#Coat of arms

== Becke ==
Coat of arms of Becke

The coat of arms show a beech tree, separated with a wavy line from the bottom. The beech tree is the symbol of the noble family von Schüngel, who former lived in the municipality. The wavy line symbolizes the brook Oese which flows through the municipality. The three golden wolf hooks are in the bottom of the coat of arms.

The coat of arms were granted on May 6, 1939 by the Oberpräsident of the province Westphalia.

== Deilinghofen ==
Coat of arms of Deilinghofen

The coat of arms of Deilinghofen shows the wolf hooks in black on a shield diagonally divided into red and silver bars. The colors were chosen as the colors of the Werminghausen family, who were the owner of castle Klusenstein in the 15th and 16th century.

The coat of arms were granted on June 14, 1939.

== Evingsen ==
Coat of arms of Evingsen

The coat of arms of Evingsen shows a shoe making awl in the right half, symbolizing the production of shoe making tools - together with wire production the most important industries of the municipality. To the left are the three yellow wolf hooks as the common symbol of the Amt Hemer.

The coat of arms were granted on July 17, 1939.

== Frönsberg ==
Coat of arms of Frönsberg

The coat of arms of Frönsberg shows the three golden wolf hooks in top. At the bottom are three red buffalo ears, positioned 120° apart around a golden ball. This symbol represents the Romberg family, who owned the manor Frönsberg in the 18th century.

The coat of arms were granted on June 14, 1939.

== Ihmert ==
Coat of arms of Ihmert

The coat of arms of Ihmert shows a hollow punch in the top, as a symbol for the wire industry in the Ihmert valley. In the bottom of the coat of arms are the three yellow wolf hooks as the common symbol of the Amt Hemer.

The coat of arms were granted on June 14, 1939.

== Kesbern ==
Coat of arms of Kesbern

The coat of arms of Kesbern shows the wolf hooks in the bottom on stylized triple hill on silver background, as Kesbern is located on a hill between forests. In the top half are two silver plowshares, referring to the rural character of the municipality.

The coat of arms were granted on June 14, 1939.
