= Bieberbach (Hönne) =

River in Germany

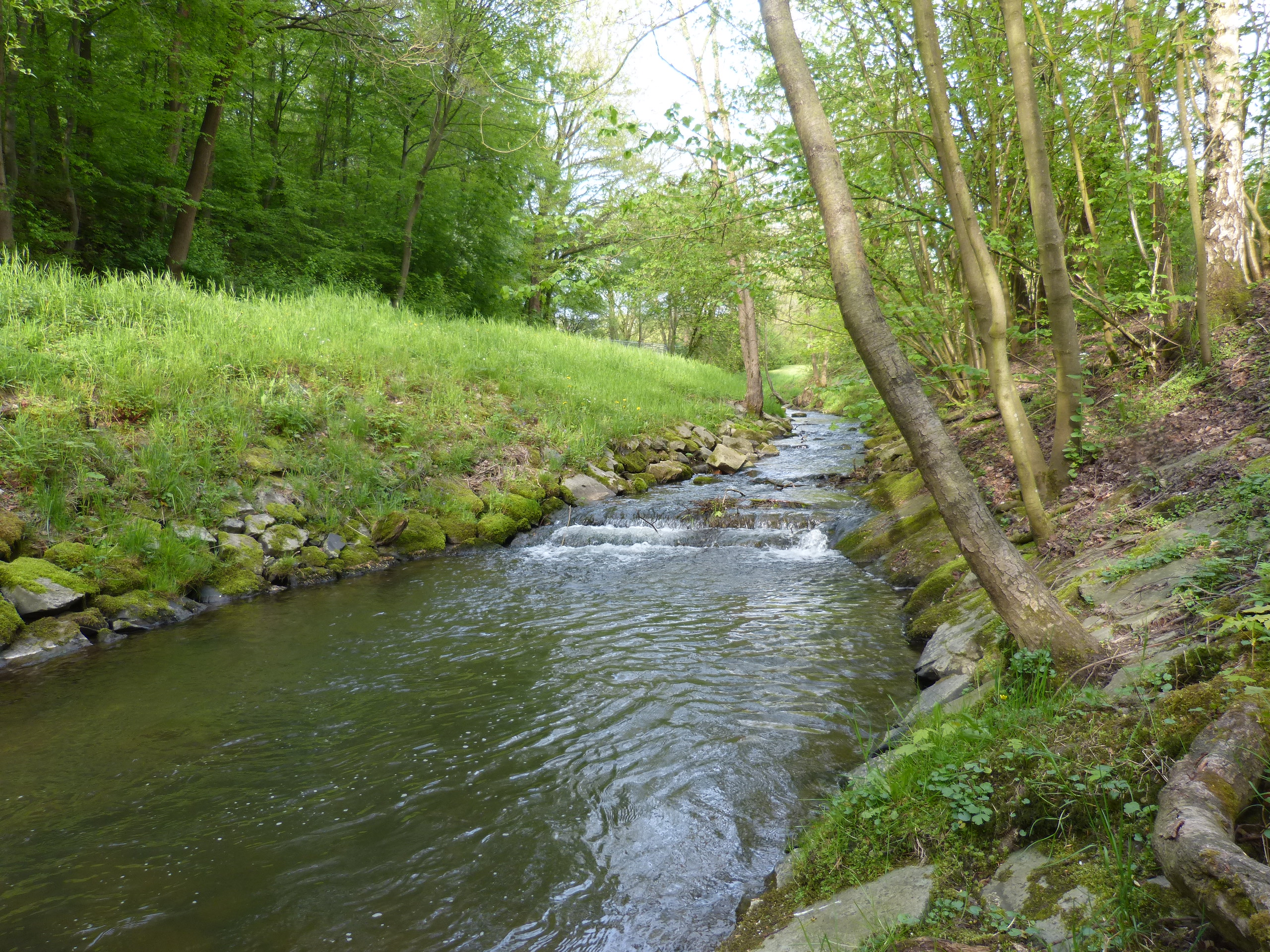

Location
- Country: Germany
- State: North Rhine-Westphalia

Physical characteristics
- Mouth
  - location: Hönne
  - coordinates: 51.4116°N 7.8306°E
- Length: 14.4 km (8.9 mi)

Basin features
- Progression: Hönne→ Ruhr→ Rhine→ North Sea

Bieberbach is a river of North Rhine-Westphalia, Germany. It flows into the Hönne near Menden.

== See also ==
- List of rivers of North Rhine-Westphalia
