= David Wilms =

German television host

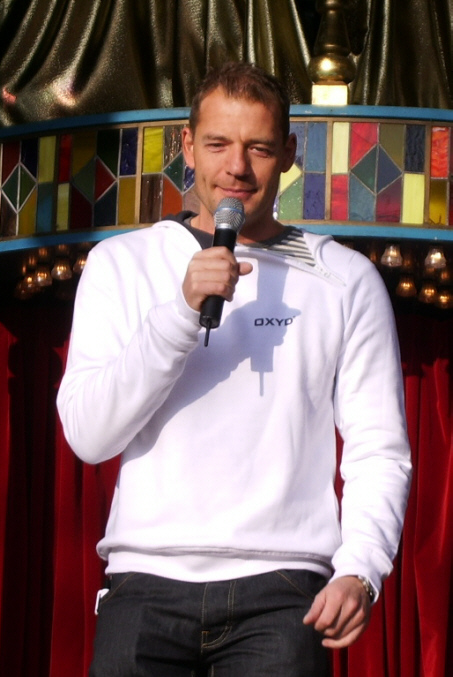
David Wilms

David Wilms (born October 10, 1963 in Fröndenberg/Ruhr, Germany) is a German television host. He hosts shows on Super RTL like Super Toy Club and Q-Boot DAS QUIZ. At the age of five Wilms was already onstage and sang Schlager or talking sketches.

Between 1991 and 1993 he hosted the gay-themed show Andersrum on Berlin's TV channel FAB .

Between 1997 and 1999 he played Theo Klages in German soap opera Lindenstraße, who wed Carsten Flöter before same sex marriage was made legal. He's a trained educator, but works also in other fields. He lives in Cologne where he is director of the entertainment-company bigSmile.

== Career ==
=== Actor ===
- Lindenstraße (ARD)
- Gute Zeiten, schlechte Zeiten (RTL)
- Unter uns (RTL)
- Streit um drei (ZDF)
- Jede Menge Leben (ZDF)
- Lukas (ZDF)
- Just a Matter of Duty (1993)

=== Hosting ===
- Toggo Weihnachtsmarkt
- Q-Boot – Das Quiz (Super RTL, 2001–2002)
- Super Toy Club (Super RTL, 1999–2005)
- Deutschland sucht den Superstar – Das Magazin (Super RTL)
- Toggo Total (Super RTL)
- Toggo Spaß Tag (Super RTL)
- Kreativ-Jugendwettbewerb der Banken in NRW
- Bravo Super Show (RTL; Warm Up)
- US 5 Fankonzert (RTL 2, BRAVO TV)
- Toy Innovation Award (Spielwarenmesse Nürnberg)
- Schokoticket 2007 (Casting und Jury; Verkehrsverband Rhein-Ruhr)
- Toggo Tour (Super RTL)
- Schau nicht weg Live Open Air 2007 (VIVA, Pre-Show)
- Toggo Tour 2008 (Super RTL)
- Die Toggo 5 (Super RTL; Top 10 Song: My Wish For Christmas)
- BRAVO meets YOU-Jugendmesse
- Der goldene Spatz (MDR)

=== Producer ===
- „Haselhörnchen, Jammerlappen and Co.“ (Toggo TV, Super RTL)
- „Peb und Pebber – Helden privat“, (Toggo TV, Super RTL)
- „Clara Siel“ on Hella von Sinnen Show (Sat.1)
- „Die anspruchsvollen Rollen“ („Zimmer frei“, WDR)
- „Wiwaldi“ („Zimmer frei“, WDR)
- „Tuck“ (Fantsypride, Phantasialand in Brühl)
- Die Haselhörnchen-Show
