= Fröndenberg =

- Municipality
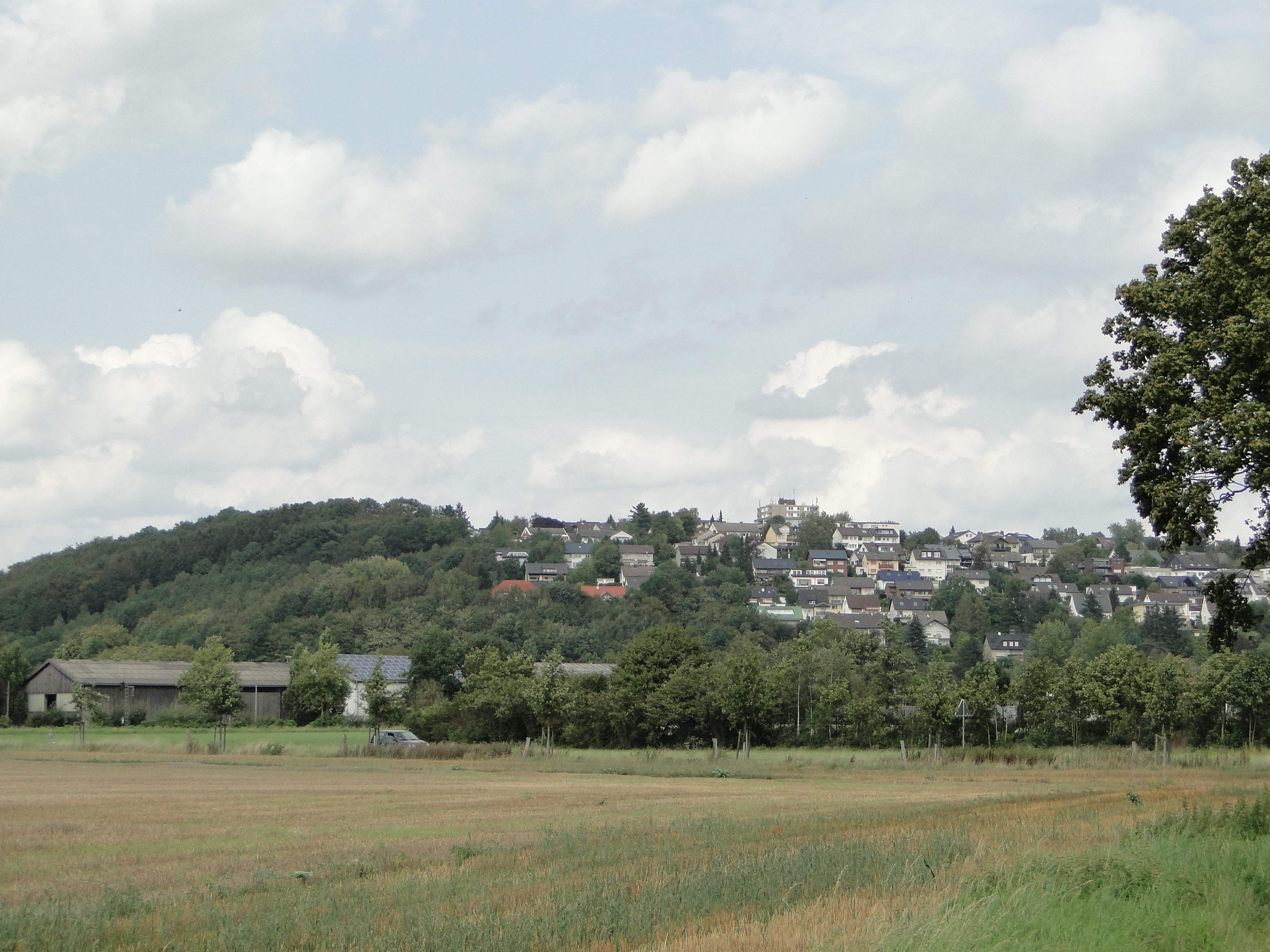

- Coat of arms

- Location of Fröndenberg within Unna district
- Interactive map of Fröndenberg
- Location within Germany Location within North Rhine-Westphalia
- Coordinates: 51°28′19″N 7°45′57″E
- Country: Germany
- State: North Rhine-Westphalia
- Admin. region: Arnsberg
- District: Unna

Government
  - Mayor (2020–25): Sabina Müller (SPD)

Area
  - Total: 56.23 km^{2} (21.71 sq mi)
- Elevation: 181 m (594 ft)

Population (2025-12-31)
  - Total: 20,330
  - Density: 361.6/km^{2} (936.4/sq mi)
- Time zone: UTC+01:00 (CET)
  - Summer (DST): UTC+02:00 (CEST)
- Postal codes: 58730
- Dialling codes: 02373, 02303, 02377, 02378
- Vehicle registration: UN
- Website: www.froendenberg.de

Fröndenberg (German pronunciation: [ˈfʁœndn̩ˌbɛʁk]; Westphalian: Frönnenbiärg) is a town in the district of Unna, in North Rhine-Westphalia, Germany.

== Geography ==
Fröndenberg is situated in the Ruhr valley, approx. 10 km south-east of the district capital Unna, near the Hönne.

=== Neighbouring places ===
- Unna
- Wickede
- Menden
- Schwerte
- Holzwickede

== History ==
The city as such is relatively new, it grew out of the reorganization in 1902 whereby the former independent villages Stift, Westick and village Froendenberg melted into the bigger village community of Fröndenberg. It obtained city status in 1952. The oldest record of the name `Frundeberg` is the papal document by Coelestin III from 1197.

The present day administrative infrastructure goes back to 1968 when the villages Altendorf, Ardey, Bausenhagen, Dellwig, Frohnhausen, Frömern, Langschede, Neimen, Ostbüren, Stentrop, Strickherdicke, the town of Warmen and the town of Fröndenberg were merged into one administrative unit. In 1969 the village Bentrop also became part of the Fröndenberg district.

== Population ==
Historical population

Year	Pop.	±% p.a.
1965	16,894	—
1970	17,779	+1.03%
1975	19,289	+1.64%
1980	20,624	+1.35%
1985	20,040	−0.57%
1990	21,252	+1.18%
1995	22,145	+0.83%

Year	Pop.	±% p.a.
2000	22,995	+0.76%
2005	22,903	−0.08%
2010	21,915	−0.88%
2015	20,961	−0.89%
2020	20,566	−0.38%
2025	20,330	−0.23%

Source: Landesdatabank Nordrhein-Westfalen

== Notable people ==
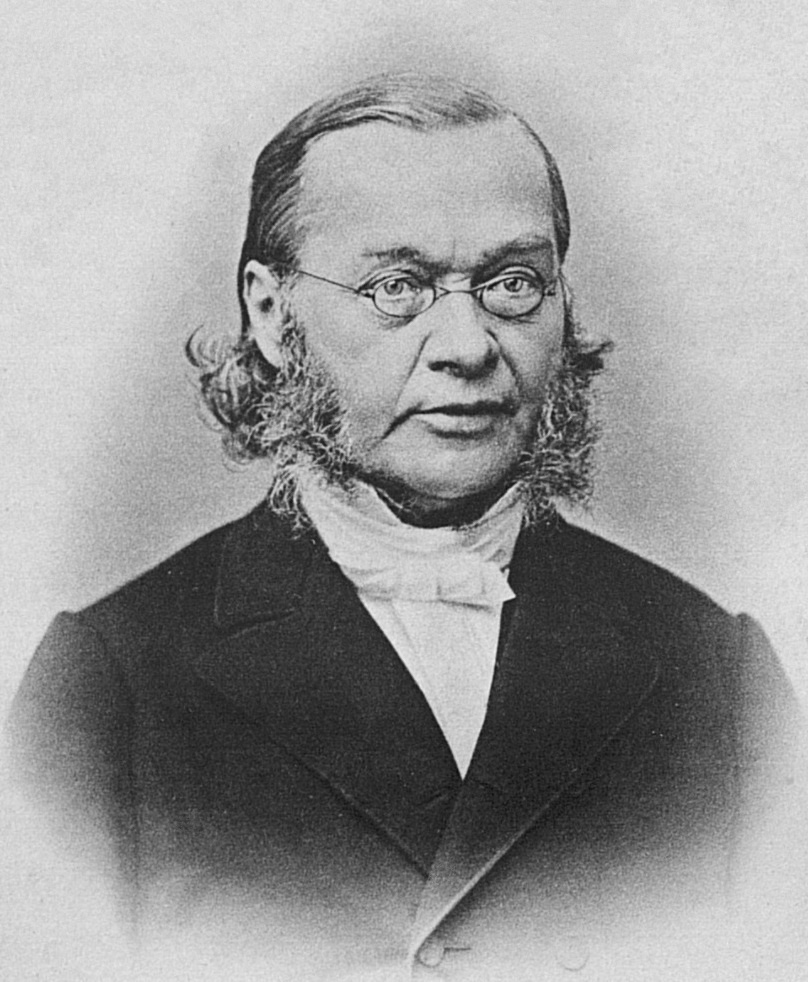
Ernst Wilhelm Hengstenberg

- David Blacha (born 1990), football midfielder
- Franz-Josef Bode (born 1951), 1986–1991 Catholic pastor in St. Marien
- Ernst Wilhelm Hengstenberg (1802–1869), Protestant theologian and churchman
- Arthur Jonath (1909–1963), Olympic medalist in sprint running
- Thomas Lehn (born 1958), musician
- David Wilms (born 1963), television host

== International relations ==
Fröndenberg is twinned with:

- Bruay-la-Buissière (Pas-de-Calais, France)
- Winschoten (Netherlands)
- Hartha (Germany)
