= Werdohl station =

Railway station in Werdohl, Germany

Werdohl
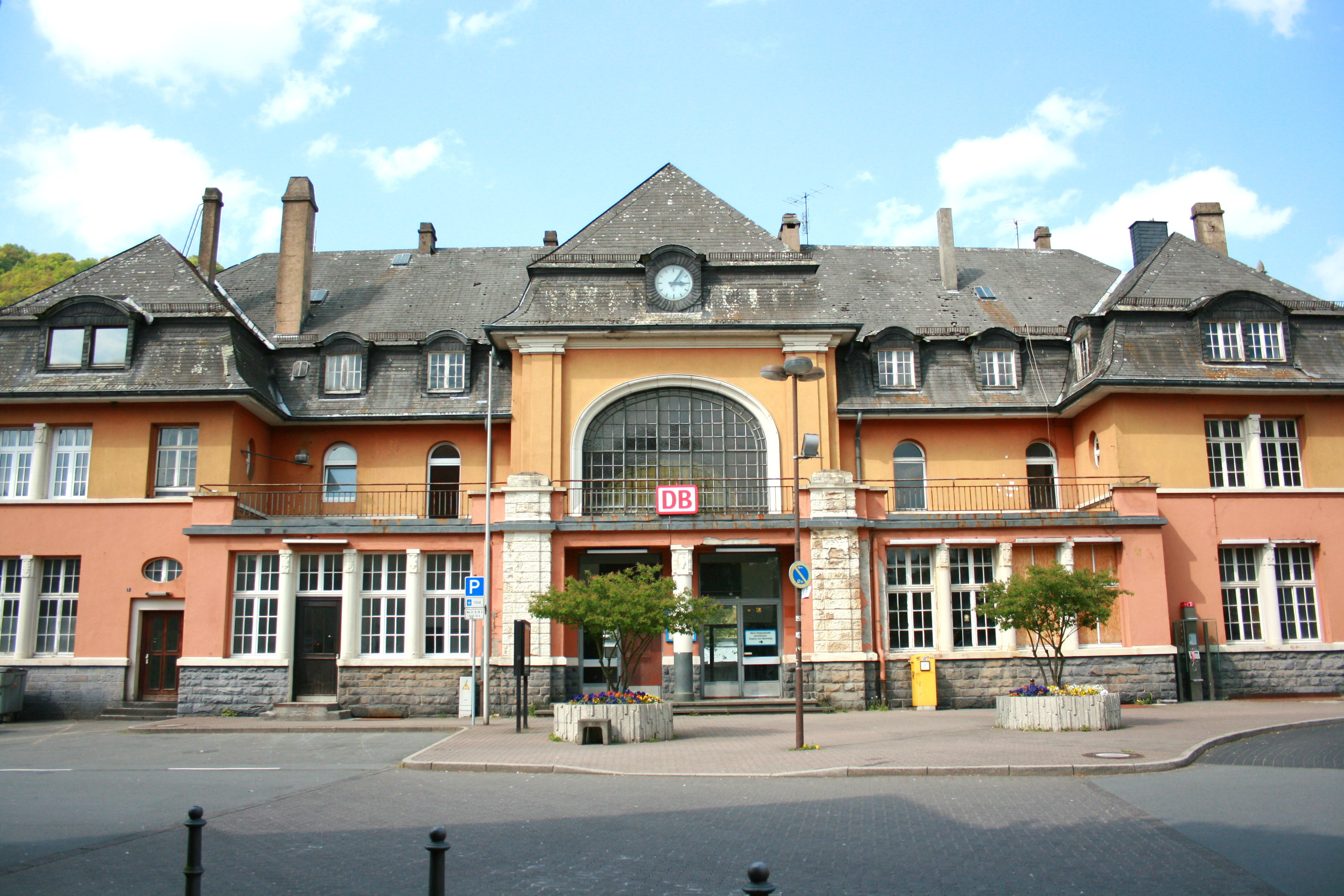

General information
- Location: Werdohl, North Rhine-Westphalia; Germany
- Coordinates: 51°15′34″N 7°45′30″E
- Lines: Ruhr–Sieg railway; Altena District Railway until 1955
- Platforms: 2

Construction
- Accessible: Yes

Other information
- Station code: 6683
- DS100 code: EWHL
- IBNR: 8006339
- Category: 5
- Fare zone: Westfalentarif: 48101
- Website: www.bahnhof.de

History
- Opened: 6 August 1861

Services
Preceding station	DB Fernverkehr	Following station
Altena (Westf) towards Dortmund Hbf or Münster Hbf	IC 34	Plettenberg towards Frankfurt (Main) Hbf or Friedberg (Hess)
Preceding station	DB Regio NRW	Following station
Altena (Westf) towards Dortmund Hbf	RE 34	Plettenberg towards Siegen Hbf
Preceding station	VIAS	Following station
Altena (Westf) towards Hagen Hbf	RB 91	Plettenberg towards Siegen
Location

Werdohl station is the passenger station of the town of Werdohl in the German state of North Rhine-Westphalia. It lies on the Ruhr–Sieg railway, running from Hagen to Siegen and was opened in 1861 with the commissioning of the line. From 1887 to 1955 Werdohl was also the terminus of a narrow-gauge railway line to Lüdenscheid operated by the Altena District Railway (Kreis Altenaer Eisenbahn).

Since the end of December 2012 Werdohl station is also a stop on the Sauerland-Höhenflug hiking trail.

== Remodeling of the station building ==
A neo-baroque entrance building with two storeys was built in 1914. It is now a monument on the Märkische Straße Technischer Kulturdenkmäler ("Märkische technical heritage road"). Since July 2011, the station has been extensively renovated by the Werdohl municipality. The renovation was expected to cost a total of around €2.3 million. In addition, the main entrance was modified to provide barrier-free access. The refurbished Werdohl station building was formally opening on 15 June 2013.

== Rail services ==
In the 2026 timetable, the following regional services stop at the station:

Line	Route	Frequency
IC 34	(Münster – Hamm –) Dortmund – Witten – Werdohl – Finnentrop – Siegen – Siegen – Dillenburg – Wetzlar – Bad Nauheim – Frankfurt / Friedberg (Hess)	5 train pairs
RE 34; Dortmund–Siegerland-Express	(Dortmund – Witten – Hagen –) Iserlohn-Letmathe – Werdohl – Kreuztal – Siegen	60 or 120 min (60 mins for IC 34 and RE 34 together)
RB 91; Ruhr-Sieg-Bahn	Hagen – Iserlohn-Letmathe – Werdohl – Finnentrop – Siegen	60 min

== Bus services ==
Bus services run from the station forecourt to the town of Werdohl and to Altena, Lüdenscheid, Neuenrade and Plettenberg:

Line	Route	Frequency in minutes (Mon–Fri)	Frequency in minutes (Sat)	Frequency in minutes (Sun)
S2	Lüdenscheid Bf – Lüdenscheid-Sauerfeld ZOB – Lüdenscheid-Worth – Werdohl Bf – Plettenberg-Ohle Post – Plettenberg Bf – Plettenberg-Grünestr. ZOB	30 / 60	60	60
36	Werdohl-Kirche – Werdohl Bf – Werdohl-Ütterlingsen – Werdohl-Dresel – Altena-Stortel – Altena-Bungern – Altena-Post – Altena-Am Markaner ZOB – Altena-Stadtwerke	60 / 120	120	No services
60	Werdohl Bf – Werdohl-Kirche – Werdohl-Bausenberg – Neuenrade-Wilhelmshöhe – Neuenrade-Mitte – Neuenrade Bf – Neuenrade-Bauhof – Neuenrade-Küntrop Wendestelle	30 / 60	60	60
61	Lüdenscheid-Kulturhaus – Lüdenscheid-Sauerfeld ZOB – Lüdenscheid-Worth – Lüdenscheid-Wettringhof – Werdohl-Kleinhammer – Werdohl-Blechhammer – Werdohl-Kirche – Werdohl Bf	30 / 60	60	60
62	Werdohl-Kirche – Werdohl Bf – Werdohl-Ütterlingsen – Werdohl-Danziger Str. – Werdohl-Berliner Str. – Werdohl-Leipziger Str.	30 / 60	60	60
63	Werdohl Bf – Werdohl-Kirche – Werdohl-Blechhammer – Werdohl-Kleinhammer – Werdohl-Schulzentrum Riesei – Werdohl-Parkplatz Riesei	30 / 60	60 / no services	No services
64	Werdohl-Rodt – Werdohl Bf – Werdohl-Kirche – Werdohl-Krankenhaus – Werdohl-Am Paulstück – Werdohl-Oberer Bausenberg – Werdohl-Hartmecke	60	60 / 60 (call scheduled trips)	60 (call scheduled trips)
65	Werdohl Bf – Werdohl-Kirche – Werdohl-Königsburg – Werdohl-In der Becke – Werdohl-Königsburg – Werdohl-Kirche – Werdohl Bf	30 / 60	60	60
66	Werdohl-Seniorenheim Forsthaus – Werdohl Bf – Werdohl-Kirche – Werdohl-Blechhammer – Werdohl-Kleinhammer – Werdohl-Bremfeld – Werdohl-Am Großen Stück	60 (call scheduled trips)	60 / 120 (call scheduled trips)	120 (call scheduled trips)
260	Werdohl Bf – Werdohl-Kirche – Werdohl-Bausenberg – Neuenrade-Wilhelmshöhe – Neuenrade-Mitte – Neuenrade Bf – Neuenrade-Küntrop Wendestelle – Altena-Nettenscheid Siedlung	No regular services	No services	No services
274	(Neuenrade-Küntrop Wendestelle – Neuenrade Bf – Neuenrade-Mitte – Neuenrade-Wilhelmshöhe) / (Werdohl Bf – Werdohl-Kirche) – Werdohl-Kettling – Plettenberg-Böddinghausen Schulzentrum	No regular services	No services	No services
Bürgerbus 1	Werdohl Bf – Werdohl-Kirche – Werdohl-Herbscheider Mühle – Werdohl-Kettling – Werdohl-Herbscheider Mühle – Werdohl-Kirche – Werdohl Bf	120	No services	No services
Bürgerbus 2	Werdohl Bf – Werdohl-Kirche – Werdohl-Derwentsider Str. – Werdohl-Bürgerhaus – Werdohl-Krankenhaus – Werdohl-Eggenpfad – Werdohl-Derwentsider Str. – Werdohl Bf	120 / 240	No services	No services
Bürgerbus 3	Werdohl Bf – Werdohl-Kirche – Werdohl-An der Vorthbrücke – Werdohl-Königsburg – Werdohl-Bergstr. – Werdohl-Versevörde – Werdohl-Kirche – Werdohl Bf	120 / 240	No services	No services
Bürgerbus 4	Werdohl Bf – Werdohl-Kirche – Werdohl-Derwentsider Str. – Werdohl-Wilhelmshöhe – Werdohl-Unterm Bausenberg – Werdohl-Wilhelmshöhe – Werdohl-Derwentsider Str. – Werdohl Bf	120 / 240	No services	No services
