= Hermann Wilken =

16th Century German Humanist & Mathematician (1522–1603)

- Born: Hermann Wilken; 1522; Neuenrade, Germany
- Died: 7 February 1603 (aged 80–81); Heidelberg, Germany
- Occupations: Humanist and Mathematician

Hermann Wilken (1522 in Neuenrade – 7 February 1603 in Heidelberg), also known as Hermann Witekind and with the pseudonym of Augustin Lercheimer, was a German humanist and mathematician.

== Biography ==
Originary of Neuenrade, in Westphalia, he studied in Frankfurt (Oder) (1545/46) and in Wittenberg (1547), where he was an alumn of Philipp Melanchthon. In 1552 Wilken was recommended by him to teach at the Latin Cathedral School in Riga, becoming rector in 1554. In 1561 he studied at the University of Rostock and in 1563 he became professor of Greek language in the Faculty of Arts at the University of Heidelberg.

In 1585 he published, under the pseudonym of Augustine Lercheimer, "Christlich bedenken und erinnerung von Zauberey" (i.e.: Christian memory about witchcraft), his book against the persecution of witches. Some witchcraft theorists, as Johann Georg Gödelmann and Anton Praetorius, were influenced by Wilken.
