= Küntrop =

- Ortsteil of Neuenrade
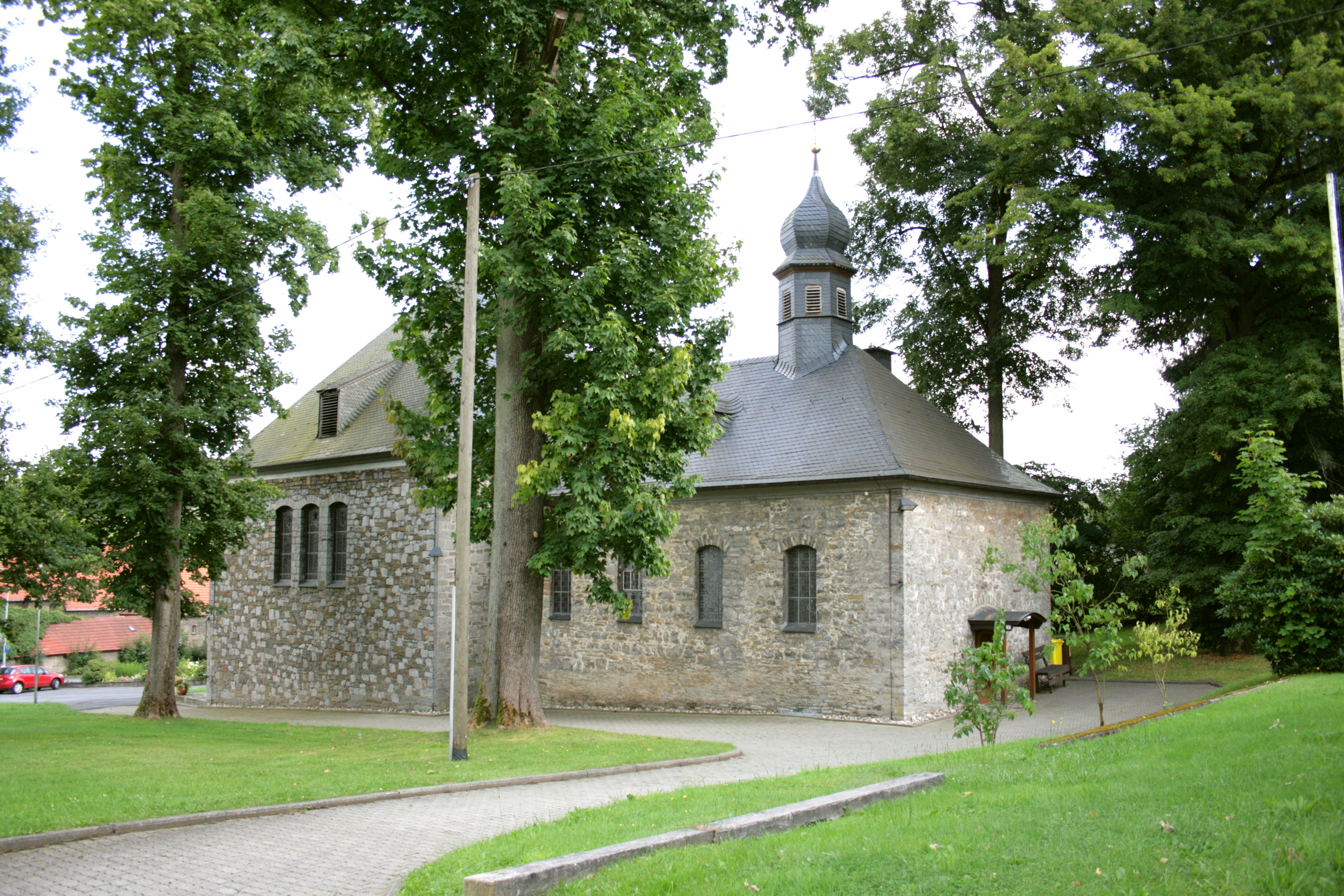
- St. George's church
- Interactive map of Küntrop
- Location within Germany Location within North Rhine-Westphalia
- Coordinates: 51°17′5″N 7°49′4″E
- Country: Germany
- State: North Rhine-Westphalia
- Admin. region: Arnsberg
- District: Märkischer Kreis
- Municipality: Neuenrade
- Elevation: 285–499 m (935–1,637 ft)

Population (2010-12-31)
  - Total: 1,498
- Time zone: UTC+01:00 (CET)
  - Summer (DST): UTC+02:00 (CEST)
- Postal codes: 58809
- Dialling codes: 02392, 02394
- Vehicle registration: MK
- Website: Official website

Küntrop is a German village in Neuenrade, a municipality in Märkischer Kreis, North Rhine-Westphalia. Until 1969 it was an autonomous municipality and, as of 2010, its population was of 1,498.

== Geography ==
The village is located in the eastern suburb of Neuenrade on the roads linking the town with Balve in north, and Plettenberg in south. Its highest point (499 amsl) is represented by a hill named Küntroper Berg. It is served by a station on the Hönnetalbahn, a railway line running from Neuenrade to Menden.

== See also ==
- Neuenrade
- Affeln
- Sauerland
