= Hendrik Sirringhaus =

German ice hockey player

- Born: 6 February 1985 (age 40); Hemer, West Germany
- Height: 5 ft 11 in (180 cm)
- Weight: 185 lb (84 kg; 13 st 3 lb)
- Position: Goaltender
- Catches: Right
- Oberliga team Former teams: EHC Netphen; Herner EV, Iserlohn Roosters
- Playing career: 2003–present

Hendrik Sirringhaus (born 6 February 1985 in Hemer, North Rhine-Westphalia) is a German ice hockey goaltender who currently plays for EHC Netphen of the German Oberliga. He previously played with Herner EV and in the Deutsche Eishockey Liga with the Iserlohn Roosters. He joined the first-tier team at the age of 18 and served as the team's third-choice goalie.
