= Michael Jeltsch =

German-Finnish biochemist

Michael Jeltsch (born July 28, 1969, Hemer/NW, Germany) is a German-Finnish researcher in the field of Biochemistry. He is a professor at the University of Helsinki, Finland. He has more than 70 publications. Jeltsch was the first to show that VEGF-C and VEGF-D are the principal growth factors for the lymphatic vasculature and his research focuses on cancer drug targets and lymphangiogenesis. He has also contributed to other seminal publications in cell biology with transgenesis, protein engineering, recombinant production and purification. In 2006, he developed a synthetic super-VEGF, using a library of VEGF hybrid molecules using a novel, non-random DNA family shuffling method.

Jeltsch completed his graduation, postgraduation, and postdoc at Molecular/Cancer Biology Lab, University of Helsinki, Helsinki, Finland. He worked as a researcher at Lymphatix Ltd. (now Ark Therapeutics) via Licentia Ltd., Helsinki, Finland (April 2006 – January 2007) and at Circadian Technologies via Vegenics Ltd. via Licentia Ltd., Helsinki, Finland (February 2007 – December 2011), where he was involved in the research on VEGF-C and VEGF-D as drugs and drug targets. He worked as a Postdoctoral Fellow at the Wihuri Research Institute, Helsinki, Finland from January 2013 to August 2013. Since 2013, he is a Group leader and since 2020 Associate Professor for Pharmaceutical Protein Drug Research at the Faculty of Pharmacy at University of Helsinki, Helsinki, Finland. The Jeltsch lab is affiliated with the Drug Development Program and the Individualized Drug Therapy Research Program.

He was awarded Medix Prize by the Minerva Foundation Institute for Medical Research for best biomedical publication of the year in Finland in March 1997. In 2003, he received the Mandatum Prize for the best PhD thesis in the field of biotechnology in Finland. In 2015, he received the “Best Paper Award” in the category of Basic Science by Circulation, the journal of the American Heart Association for his 2014 work, in which he identified the molecular mechanism behind Hennekam syndrome.
