= Hönne =

River in Germany

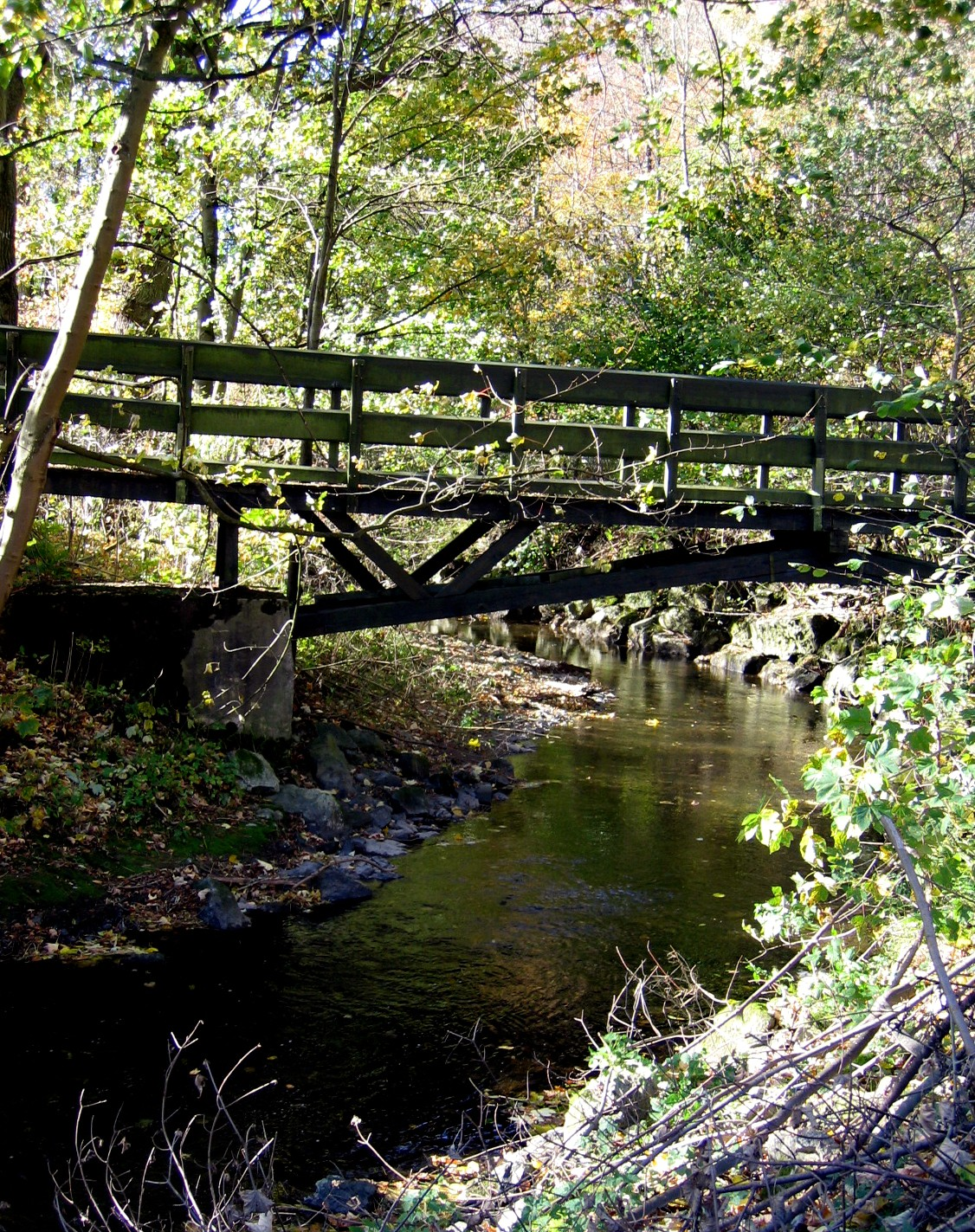
- The Hönne in Balve

Location
- Country: Germany

Physical characteristics
- Source
  - location: Neuenrade
  - elevation: 437 m (1,434 ft)
- Mouth
  - location: Ruhr
  - coordinates: 51.4683°N 7.7661°E
- Length: 33.4 km (20.8 mi)
- Basin size: 262 km^{2} (101 sq mi)

Basin features
- Progression: Ruhr→ Rhine→ North Sea

The Hönne (German pronunciation: [ˈhœnə]) is a left tributary river to the Ruhr, flowing through the northern Sauerland hills in North Rhine-Westphalia, Germany. The spring of the Hönne is located in the west of Neuenrade at 437m above sea level. After 33 km the river ends near the town of Fröndenberg. The total catchment area of the river is 262 km^{2}.

Most notable is the narrow valley between Balve and Menden, where the Hönne has carved 60m deep into Devonian limestone. Several caves are located in the valley, of which the Balver Höhle and the Reckenhöhle are accessible for visitors. When the water level in the river is low, some parts of the valley fall dry as the water flows subterraneously through the Karst rocks. Several of the tributary brooks in that valley also flow subterraneously for some parts of their course.

== Caves ==
Many caves were formed throughout the Hönne. The biggest culture cave in Europe is located in Balve. A cave with flowstone, the Reckenhöhle, is also nearby.

Some experts found signs of cannibalism in the caves (especially the Karhofhöhle) that date from 1000 to 700 BCE.

== Sources ==
- Dickhäuser, Oliver (2005). "Das Hönnetal". Der Schlüssel. 50 (2): 46–52.
