= Neuenrade =

- Town
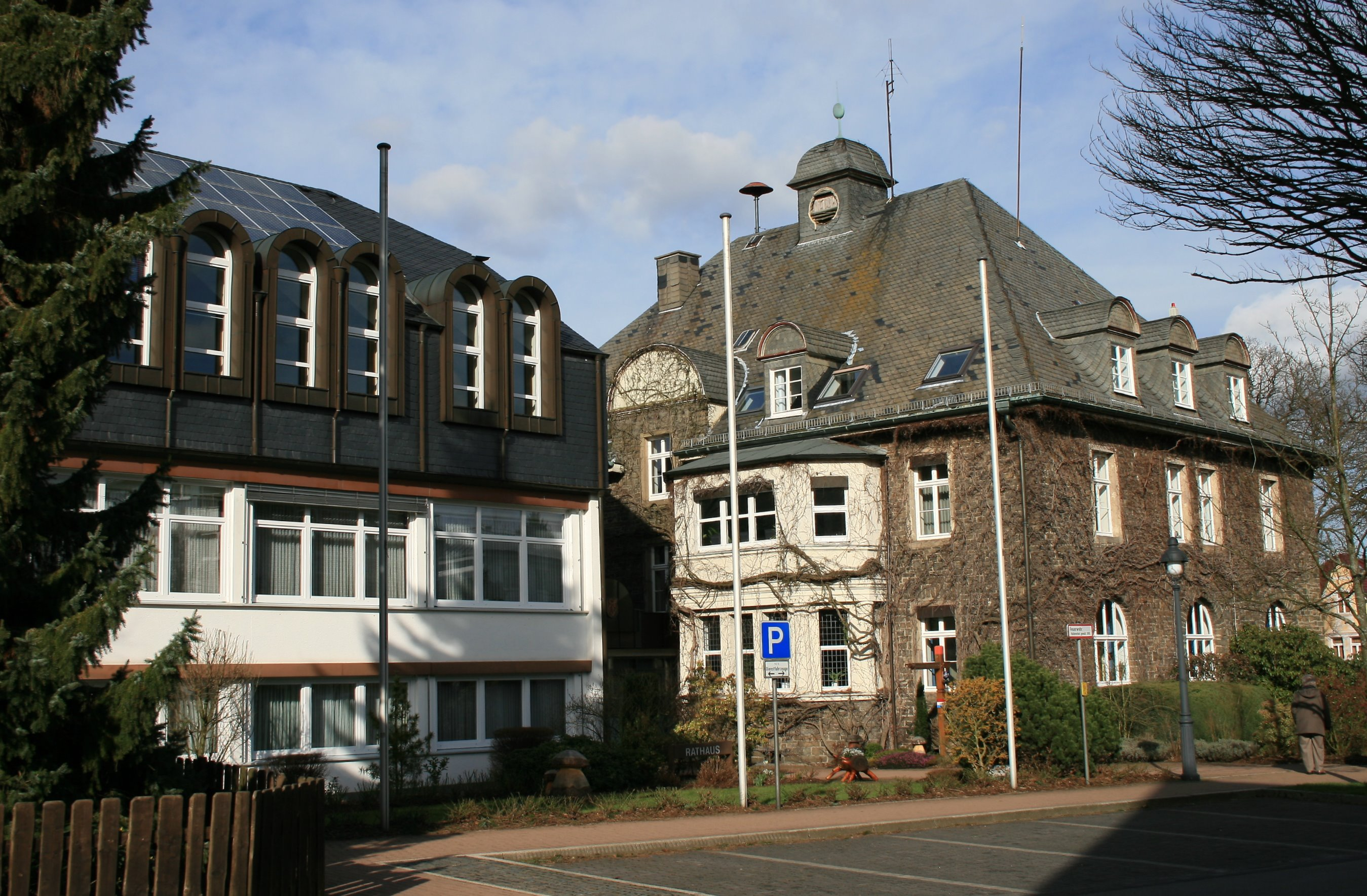
- Town hall in Neuenrade

- Coat of arms

- Location of Neuenrade within Märkischer Kreis district
- Interactive map of Neuenrade
- Location within Germany Location within North Rhine-Westphalia
- Coordinates: 51°17′02″N 07°46′48″E
- Country: Germany
- State: North Rhine-Westphalia
- Admin. region: Arnsberg
- District: Märkischer Kreis
- Subdivisions: 5

Government
  - Mayor (2020–25): Antonius Wiesemann (CDU)

Area
  - Total: 54.1 km^{2} (20.9 sq mi)
- Elevation: 320 m (1,050 ft)

Population (2025-12-31)
  - Total: 11,520
  - Density: 213/km^{2} (552/sq mi)
- Time zone: UTC+01:00 (CET)
  - Summer (DST): UTC+02:00 (CEST)
- Postal codes: 58809
- Dialling codes: 02392, 02394
- Vehicle registration: MK
- Website: www.neuenrade.de

Neuenrade (German pronunciation: [nɔʏənˈʁaːdə]) is a town in North Rhine-Westphalia, Germany, located in the hills of the Sauerland in the Märkischer Kreis.

== Geography ==
The highest elevation in the town area is the Kohlberg with an altitude of 514 m above sea level. The lowest elevation is at Hölmecke with 190 m. The town covers an area of 54.12 km², most of which is forests (29.41 km²) and farm land (18.18 km²).

The municipal territory includes the villages of Affeln, Berentrop, Blintrop and Küntrop.

== History ==
Around 1220 the place was first mentioned in a document, then named Rode. The village consisted of about 12 farms. In 1353 the city was fortified. In 1355 it received the cityrights from count Engelbert III.

By 1890/91 the municipalities Werdohl and Ohle had grown so much that they left the Amt Neuenrade, the local administrative unit. The Amt thereafter was composed of only Neuenrade and Dahle.

The Amt Neuenrade was dissolved, effective on January 1, 1969. The municipality Dahle was incorporated into Altena, while the municipality Küntrop from the Amt Balve was incorporated into the city Neuenrade. In 1975 the city was further enlarged with the municipalities Affeln, Altenaffeln and Blintrop from the Amt Balve.

== Coat of arms ==
The coat of arms is based on the coat of arms of the counts of the Mark, showing a chequered red-white bar on a yellow shield. The oldest version of the coat of arms is known from a wood carving in the city church dated from the 16th century; it showed Saint Mary on top of the coat of arms of the Mark. Later the Mary picture was moved inside the shield. It was officially granted on November 25, 1912.

After the communal reform of 1975 the city changed their coat of arms. In the bottom of the shield the black cross of the bishops of Cologne was added, representing the municipalities of the former Amt Balve which historically belonged to Kurköln. The new coat of arms was granted on March 23, 1979, based on a design by Professor Hußmann.

The Amt Neuenrade also had a coat of arms. It was granted on January 13, 1938, and was designed by Waldemar Mallek based on an idea of Dr. Fritz Thomée. It resembled the coat of arms of the city Neuenrade, the bottom part showed a mill wheel. As a municipality Dahle had no traditional heraldic symbol. The mill wheel was chosen symbolizing the traditional industries at the Nette River.

== Population development ==
Historical population

Year	Pop.	±% p.a.
1800	1,000	—
1900	2,000	+0.70%
1925	2,676	+1.17%
1933	2,779	+0.47%
1939	3,076	+1.71%
1955	5,000	+3.08%
1965	8,368	+5.28%
1970	9,403	+2.36%
1975	10,306	+1.85%
1980	11,145	+1.58%

Year	Pop.	±% p.a.
1985	11,165	+0.04%
1990	11,679	+0.90%
1995	12,009	+0.56%
2000	12,346	+0.56%
2005	12,379	+0.05%
2010	12,146	−0.38%
2015	12,024	−0.20%
2020	11,772	−0.42%
2025	11,520	−0.43%

Source: Deutsche Verwaltungsgeschichte (1925-1939) and Landesdatabank Nordrhein-Westfalen (1965-2025)

== Mayors ==
- 1964-1999: Hans Schmerbeck
- 1999-2014: Klaus-Peter Sasse

Since the 2025 elections, Volker Klüter (CDU) is the mayor of Neuenrade.

== International relations ==
Since 1978 Neuenrade has a city friendship with the Dutch municipality Dinxperlo. In 1984 it was converted into a town twinning. The partnership was reaffirmed in 2005 by the municipality Aalten, of which Dinxperlo had become part that year. Since 1990 it is also twinned with Klingenthal in Saxony.

== Personalities ==
- Hermann Wilken (1522-1603), humanist and mathematician, he died in Heidelberg
- Esther Riecke-Volkmann (born 1969, artist)
