= Festspiele Balver Höhle =

Annual arts festival in Balve, Germany

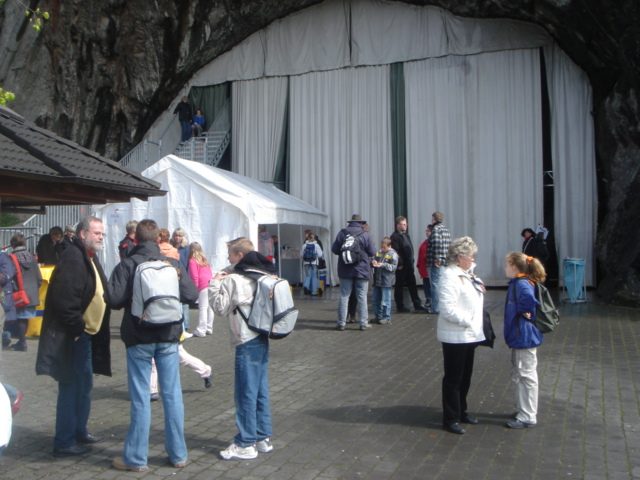
Entrance Balver Höhle in May 2005

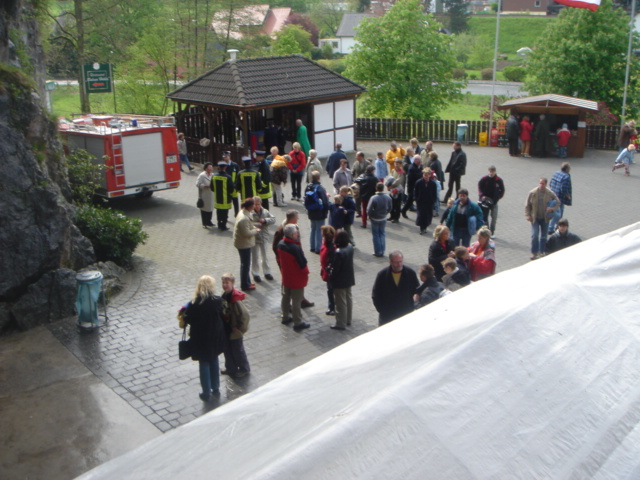
Balver Höhle in May 2005

Festspiele Balver Höhle is an arts festival, featuring musical and theatrical performances, in Balve, Germany. The festival is centered on the cave of Balve (Balver Höhle in German). The association was founded in 1985 in Volkringhausen and based on an idea by Franz Hoffmeister and Theodor Pröpper.

Lukas Koch is the chair of the board since 2015.

== Activities ==
=== Balver Märchenwochen ===
The most successful adaption was Pippi in Taka-Tuka-Land in the year 2001. In 2026 they did Robin Hood junior.

=== Justus Frantz ===
The German musical director and pianist Justus Frantz was invited by the Festspiele Balver Höhle from 1995 to 2007 each year. In the early years it was a cooperation with the Kreishandwerkerschaft Märkischer Kreis.

He conducted a soulful version of Tchaikovsky's 5th symphony with the Philharmonie der Nationen.

=== Festivals ===
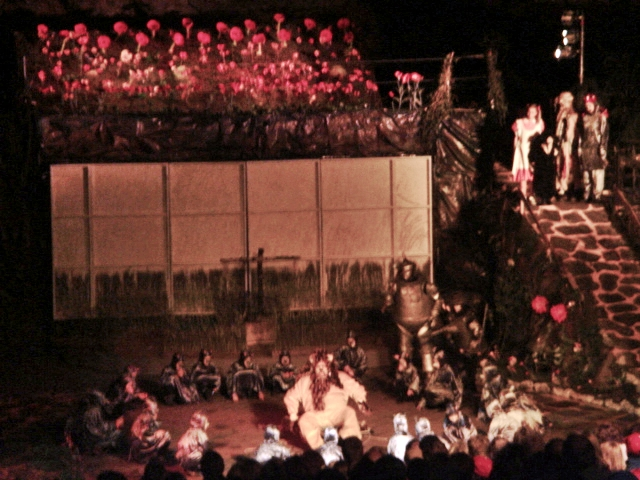
Balver Märchenwochen (2005)

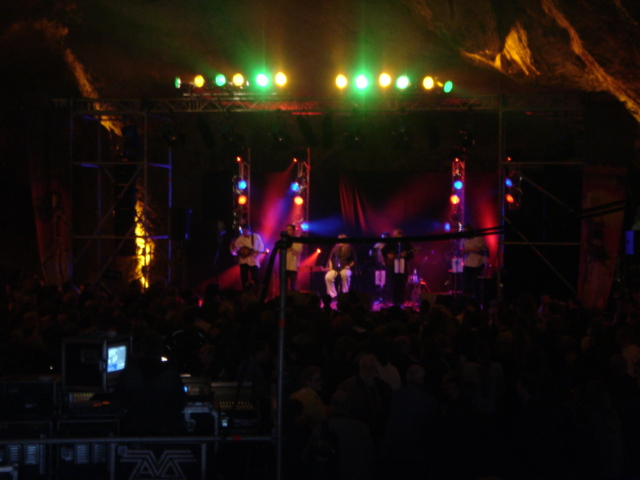
Irish Folk & Celtic Music (2005)

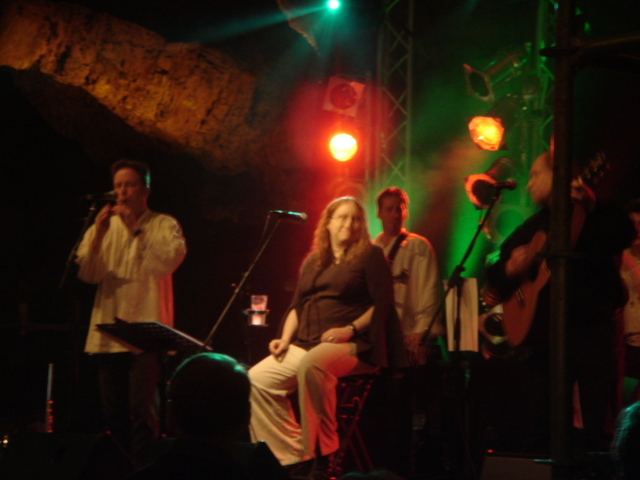
Geraldine McGowan (2005)

- Balver Märchenwochen (1991–2008)

Directors: Gabriele Krieger, Josef Bertsch

- Irish Folk & Celtic Music (2002–2008)

Directors: Stephan Haarmann

- Internationales Jazz- und Bluesfestival (1970–2005)

Directors: Frank Milewski, Bernd Bobbenkamp (2005)

=== Single music acts ===
- Rustavi ensemble (1988)
- Carmina Burana (1994)
- Klangräume (1996)

Idea and production by Joachim-Ernst Berendt.

- Earth Spirit (1997)

Director: Christian Bollmann. With Oberton-Chor Düsseldorf.
Played by Märkisches Jugendsinfonieorchester and sung by Oratorienchor Letmathe.

- Om mani padme hum (2001)

Director: Christian Bollmann. With David Ianni.

- Aida (2004)

Director: ?. Production: Loreley Klassik

- Philharmonic Orchestra Hagen (2002)

Director: Antony Hermus

- Scala & Kolacny Brothers (2005)

=== Single theatre acts ===
- Katharina von Georgien (1985–1986)

Director: Hermann Wedekind. With Werner Traud (Shah Abbas).

- The Crucible (1987)

Director: Werner Traud. Performed by VHS-Theatergruppe Iserlohn.

- Peer Gynt (1990)

Director: Hermann Wedekind. Performed by Theaterwerkstatt Melchiorsgrund and a georgian orchestra.

- The Caucasian Chalk Circle (1993)

Director: Hermann Wedekind. Performed by Theaterwerkstatt Melchiorsgrund and georgian singers.

- Das große Welttheater (1995)

Director: Hermann Wedekind. Georgian children ensemble.

- Iphigenie auf Tauris (1996)

Director: Alfred Gärtner. With Werner Traud (Thoas) and Angela Amecke-Mönnighof (Iphigenie). Additional actor: Sascha Rotermund and Christoph Traud and Klaus Lücke

- Little Shop of Horrors (1998 and 1999)

Director: Christoph Traud

- Jedermann (2005)

Director: Werner Traud
Special features: Frank Butterweck sings the invitation, composed by Linke/Traud.

=== Rehearsals ===
- Krippenspiel (started 1998, initiated by children's ensemble)
- Christian Bollmann (until 1999)
- Jazzfestival (until 2005)

== Patronage ==
- Johannes Rau († 2006), patron 1985 – 1998
- Wolfram Kuschke, patron 1999 – 2008
- Wolfgang Bosbach

== Board ==
=== Chairmen ===
In December 2007 Winfried Hagen resigned as chairman together with his wife Gabriele Hagen, his daughter Stephanie Hagen and the arts director Werner Traud. An arts director is still missing.

==== History ====
- Agatha Allhoff-Cramer (†), chairman 1985 – 1995
- Werner Traud, chairman 1996 – 2003
- Winfried Hagen, chairman 2004 – 2007
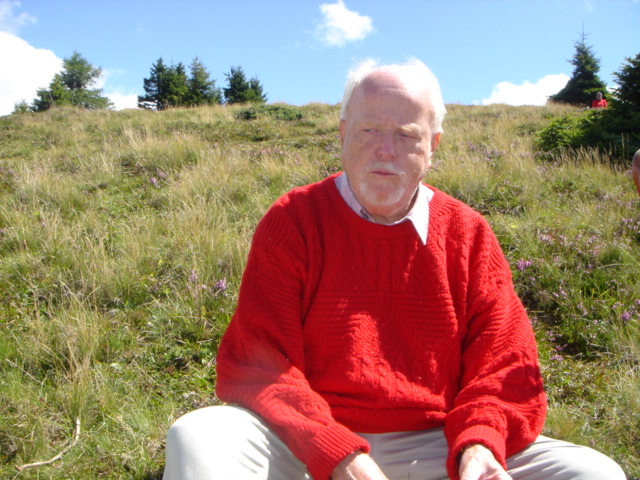
Werner Traud visiting Carinthia (2004)

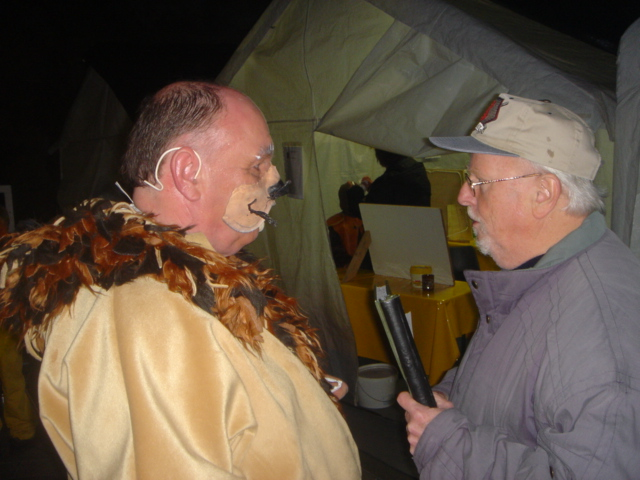
Josef Bertsch (co-director) and Werner Traud (ex-chairman) (2005)

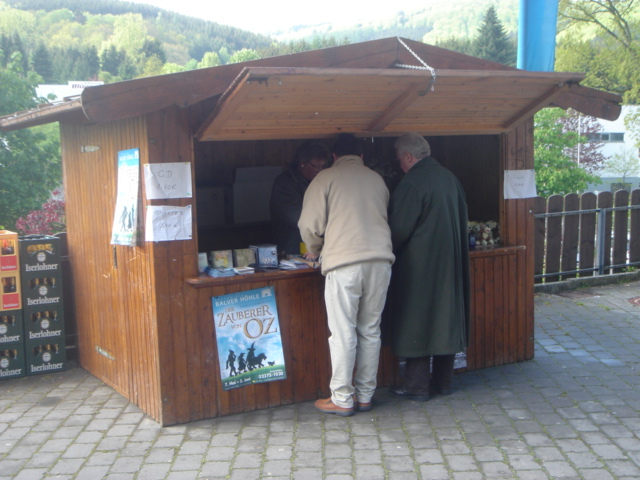
Winfried Hagen (chairman) and Uwe Geitz (vice chairman), behind Gabriele Hagen (part of the board, treasurer) (2005)

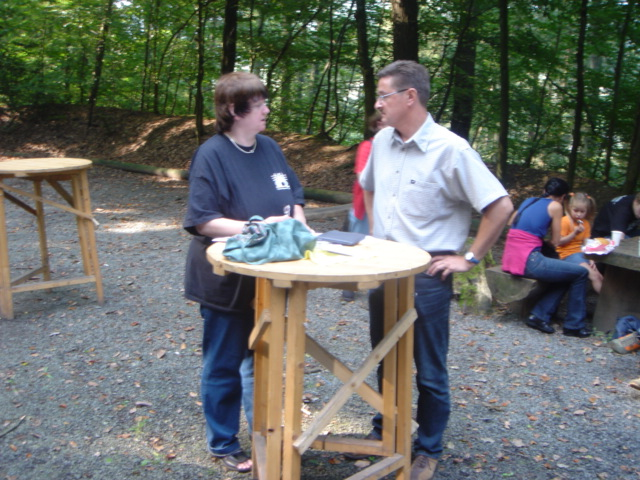
Lisa Grefe (vice chairman) and Theo Bösterling (part of the board, director of ensemble) (2005)

== Directors ==
=== Artistic directors ===
- Hermann Wedekind († 1998), artistic director 1985 – 1996
- Alfred Gärtner, artistic director 1997 – 2000
- Jochen Zoerner-Erb, artistic director 2001 – 2003
- Werner Traud, artistic director 2004 – 2007

=== Children's theatre director ===
The artistic director appoints the children's theatre director.

- Werner Traud (1991 – 2000, 2004 – 2006)
- Kai Wolters (2001–2003)
- Matthias Hay (2007)
- Gabriele Krieger (since 2008)

=== Dance director ===
The artistic director appoints the dance instructor especially for Balver Märchenwochen.

- Monika Eickelmann (1991)
- Sigrid Kanthack-Leser (1998)
- Claudia Waltermann (1998)
- Anna Maczuga-Schwabe (until 2005)
- Anke Lux (until 2007)
- William Danne (2008)

=== Musical directors ===
The artistic director appoints the musical director especially for Balver Märchenwochen.

- Alexander Schwarze (1998 – 1999, only Musical)
- Walter Kiesbauer (until 2002)
- Walter Czakiel (until 2003)
- Philipp Schreiber (until 2007)
- Ralf Linke in cooperation with Berthold Wagner (since 2004)

== Discography ==
=== CD ===
- Robin Hood 1995
- Tu es Petrus 1997
- Aladdin und die Wunderlampe 1998
- Phantastische Reise zu Kapitän Nemo 1999
- Pippi in Taka-Tuka-Land 2001
- Peter Pan 2008

=== DVD ===
- Der Zauberer von OZ 2005
- Robin Hood 2006
- Peter Pan 2008
- 5th Irish Folk & Celtic Music 2006
- 6th Irish Folk & Celtic Music 2007

=== Video ===
- Katharina von Georgien 1984
- Ronja Räubertocher 1993
- Robin Hood 1995
- Der Zauberer von OZ 2005
