= Ardenza Trio =

Bulgarian chamber music group

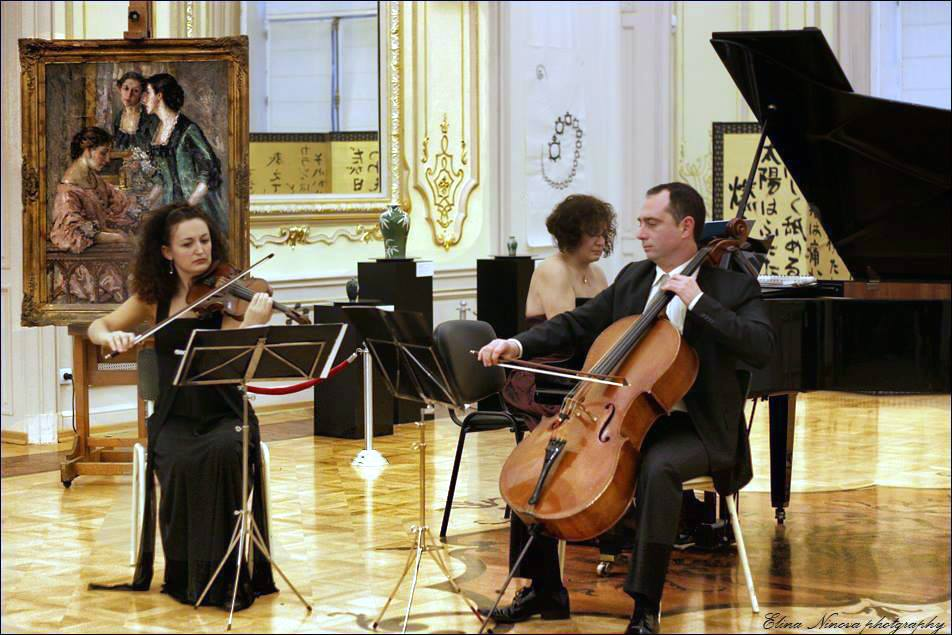

Background information
- Origin: Bulgaria
- Years active: 2005-present
- Members: Galina Koycheva; Konstantin Evtimov; Daniela Dikova
- Past members: Geoffrey Dean
- Website: http://www.ardenzamusic.org/

The Ardenza Trio is a chamber music group that formed in 2005. The founding musicians were Geoffrey Dean, cellist (America), Daniela Dikova, pianist (Bulgaria) and Galina Koycheva, violinist (Bulgaria). Konstantin Evtimov, cellist, joined the trio in 2014.

== Background ==
Ardenza Trio consists of violinist Galina Koycheva, cellist Konstantin Evtimov (both soloists of the Bulgarian National Radio) and pianist Daniela Dikova. Konstantin Evtimov joined the trio in 2014.

The chamber music trio has performed in Bulgaria, Republic of Macedonia, Albania, Austria, Germany, France, Kosovo, Croatia and Hungary. They have performed with the Burgas and Pleven philharmonic orchestras. The trio has recorded for the Bulgarian National Radio and the Bulgarian National Television.

== Prizes ==
In 2009, the Ardenza Trio was awarded the Crystal Lyre Prize for significant achievements in the sphere of musical interpretation. The prize was awarded by the Union of Bulgarian Music and Dance Professionals, Classic FM Radio, and the Bulgarian Ministry of Culture. In the same year, the trio was nominated in Sofia for the international project, "Martinu in Bulgaria". In June 2006, the trio won the "Val Tidone" prize in Italy.

== Galina Koycheva ==
Koycheva graduated from the National Music Academy of Bulgaria in Sofia. She competed in music competitions including the Setoslav Obretenov, Music and Earth, Pancho Vladigerov, Dobrin Petkov, and Musicians of the New Мillennium competition. In 2004, she was concertmaster of the Philharmonie Junge Donau.

Koycheva has performed with the Varna Philharmonic and Shumen Philharmonic orchestras, and has recorded for Bulgarian National Radio and Bulgarian National Television. She has given concerts in Japan, Cyprus, Korea, Russia, Finland, Slovenia, Poland, Czech Republic, and Pakistan. In 2005, Koycheva became the concertmaster of the Bulgarian National Radio Symphony Orchestra. She is also a member of the Lot Lorien ethnorock group.

== Konstantin Evtimov ==
Evtimov graduated from the National Music Academy of Bulgaria in Sofia. As a solo cellist, he took part in the world tour of the Philharmonie der Nationen under Justus Frantz. He made advanced studies with Maria Kliegel in Essen, Germany. In 1996, Evtimov attended a master class in Bern with Conradin Brotbek. Subsequently, he obtained concert and soloist diplomas at the High School of Music and Theater – Bern in the cello class of Conradin Brotbek. He also participated in master classes given by cellists such as Arto Noras, Robert Cohen, Martti Rousi and Young-Chang Cho.

From 1998 to 2007, Evtimov was a cellist with the Sinfonietta de Lausanne. He was the principal cellist of Camerata de Lausanne under Pierre Amoyal for 7 years. Evtimov has performed with the London Philharmonic Orchestra, the Bern, Graz, Sofia and Lausanne Symphonic Orchestras and has given recitals in London, Tokyo, and Dublin, Ireland.

Evtimov has performed chamber music with Mstislav Rostropovich, Shlomo Mintz, Yuri Bashmet, Pierre Amoyal, and Jorg Demus. He has recorded for ARD, ZDF, radio Espace 2 CH, radio ТSR – 1 CH, Radio Camerata – Tokio, Bulgarian National Radio, Bulgarian and Argentinian television.

In 2009, Evtimov became a cellist with the Bulgarian National Radio Symphony Orchestra.

== Daniela Dikova ==
Dikova graduated from the National Music Academy, where she later completed a specialization in chamber music and collaborative piano. She has participated as an accompanist at international competitions such as the “Belvedere” in Vienna, and the “Tchaikovsky” in Moscow. In 1998, Dikova became the staff pianist for the National Music Academy’s violin department.

In 2008, Dikova became a teacher in piano accompaniment at the department of chamber music at the National Music Academy in Sofia.

Dikova has performed with Petko Radev clarinetist, Ginka Gichkova violinist, Stefan Popov cellist, Gavriel Lipkind cellist, Elena Baramova soprano, and Angela Park, cellist. She has recorded for Bulgarian National Radio and Bulgarian National Television, and has concertized in Italy, Germany, France, Switzerland, Austria, and Korea.
