= Balve Cave =

Cave in Germany

Coordinates: 51.339°N 7.872°E

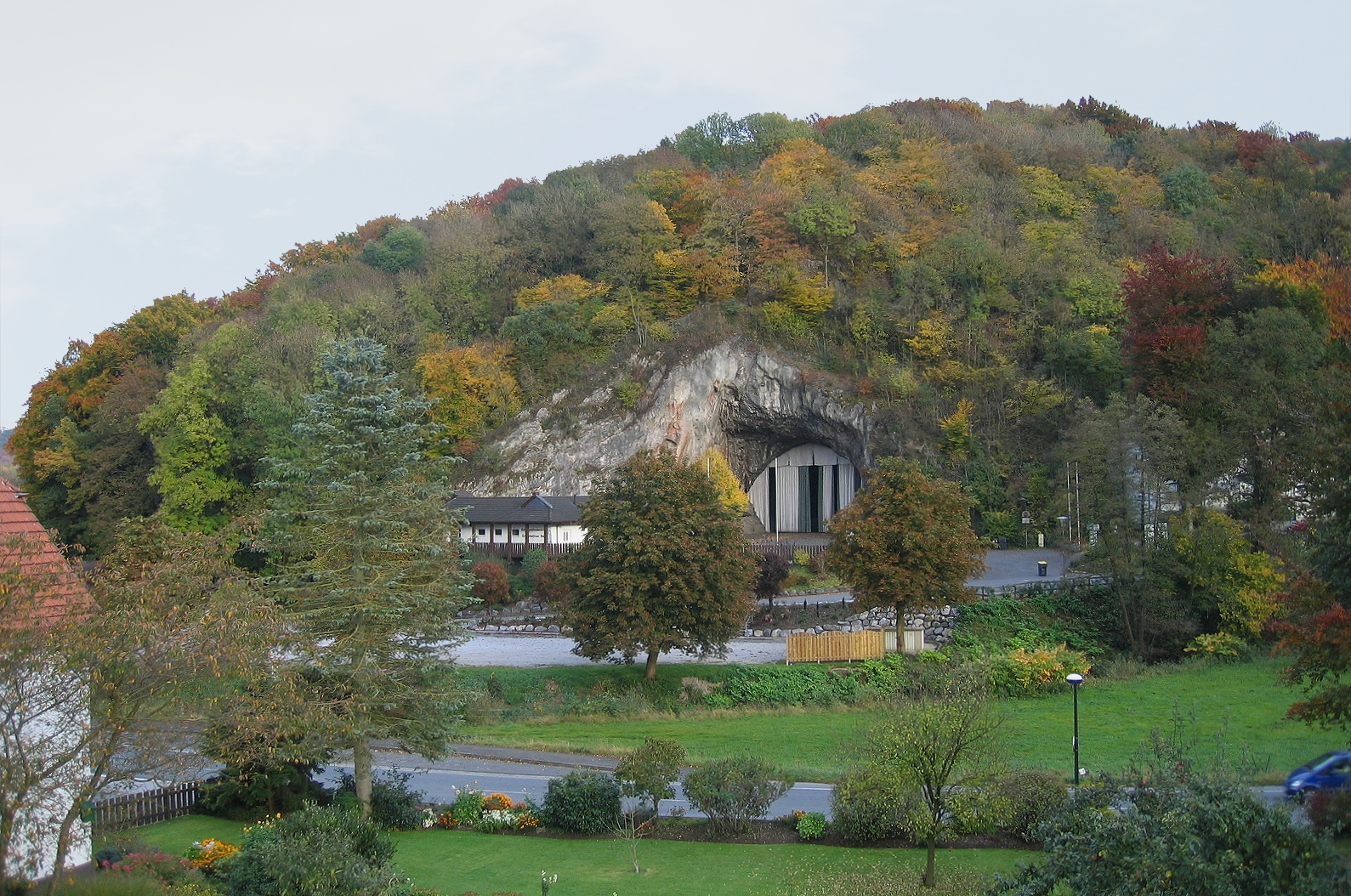
Balver Höhle

The Balver Höhle (German for Balve Cave) is the biggest cave used as a cultural venue in Europe. It is located in Balve, Germany.

== Description ==
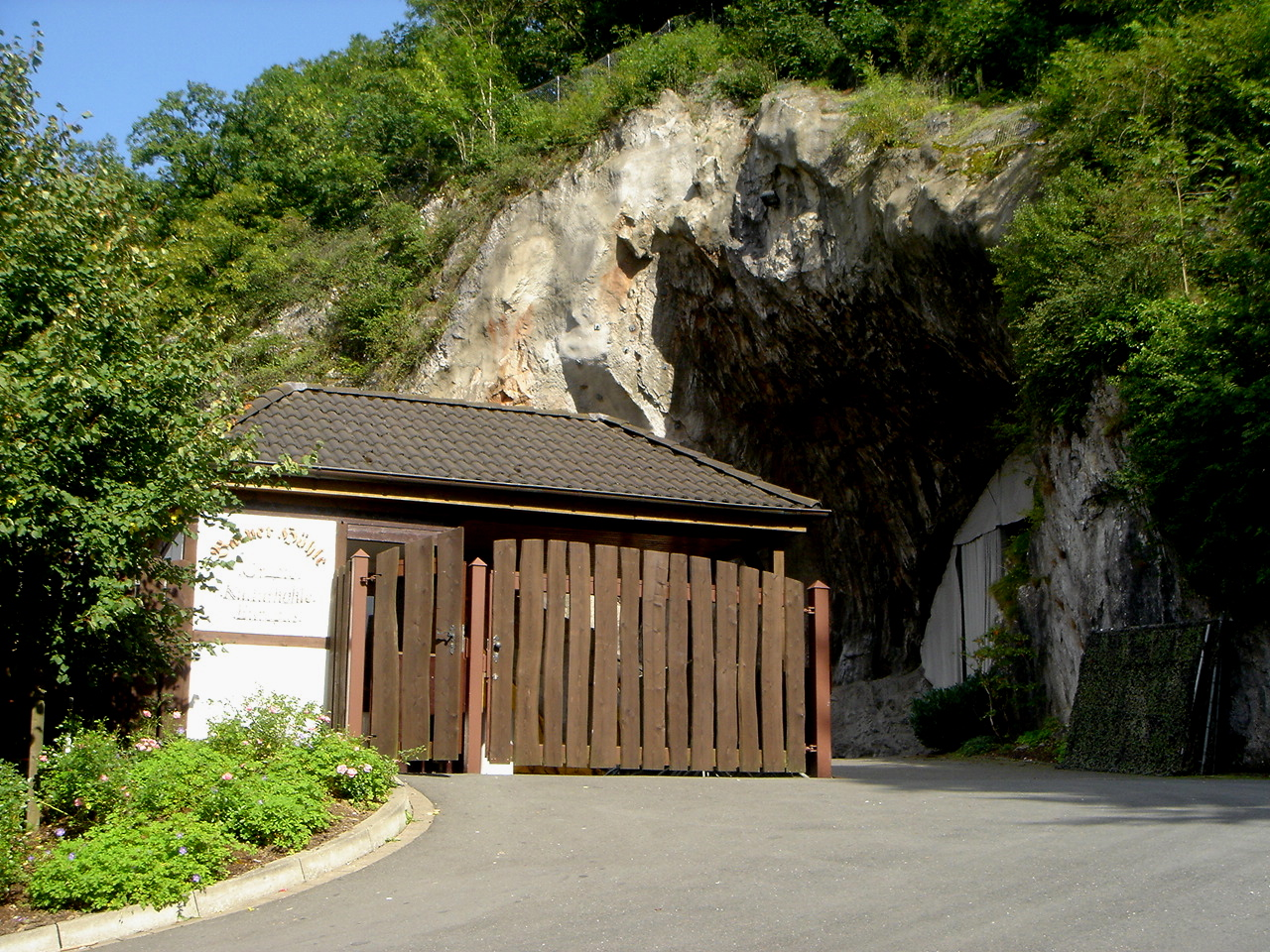
Main entrance of the cave

The cave consists of a large, tunnel-like hall with two branching side passages. These bear the names of two scientists: the geologist Heinrich von Dechen and the anatomist and naturalist Rudolf Virchow. One of the side passages has two side tunnels leading to the surface. The cave extends 70 meters (230 ft) into the rock. At its highest point near the entrance, it is 12 meters (39 ft) high (measured from the current ground level), and at its widest point inside, it is 18 meters (59 ft) wide. To compensate for the difference in height, a three-step staircase approximately 15 meters (49 ft) wide was built inside.

== History ==
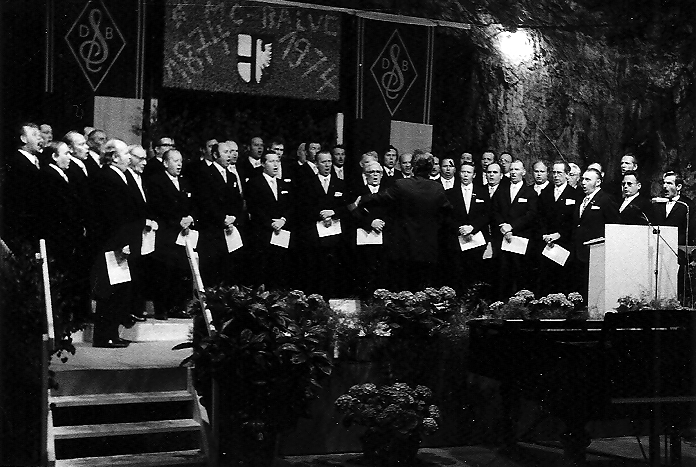
The Balve Men's Choir 1874 singing at its centenary celebration in the cave (1974)

The Balve Cave was mentioned in the Thidrekssaga. It has been used by the local Schützenfest (marksmen's festival) each year for over 160 years.

Since 1985 it has also been the venue of an annual theatre and music festival, the Festspiele Balver Höhle. Its first play was the Katharina von Georgien directed by Hermann Wedekind.In 1991 it staged dramas based on fairy tales festival was installed by Festspiele Balver Höhle. In 1998 the Festspiele Balver Höhle performed with "Aladdin und die Wunderlampe" their first oriental musical. In 2009 they did their second, "Der kleine Muck". In 1998 the music was composed by Christoph Traud, in 2009 the musical director was Markus Kaiser.

Amateurs are working together at Irish Folk & Celtic Music, Balver Märchenwochen and other activities of Festspiele Balver Höhle.

== Rehearsals ==
- Christian Bollmann (until 1999)
- Justus Frantz (1994–2007)
- Mixery-Cave

== Single events ==
- Redentiner Osterspiel
- Mal Sondock's Hitparade
- Public Viewing
- Tu es Petrus (1997)

== Recordings ==
- Live in der Balver Höhle (1980)
- Klangräume (1996)
- MTV Unplugged Fanta 4 (2000)

== Literature ==
=== In German ===
- Klaus Günther, Die altsteinzeitlichen Funde der Balver Höhle, Aschendorff Verlag, Münster 1964

== See also ==
- List of show caves in Germany
- Deutschland sucht den Superstar (season 12)
