= Konstantin Evtimov =

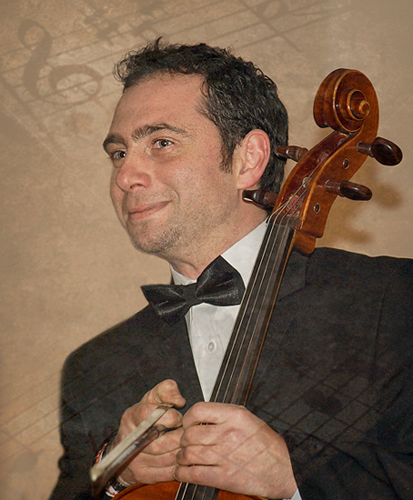
- Evtimov in 2009

Background information
- Born: July 13, 1975 (age 50)
- Origin: Ruse, Bulgaria
- Instrument: Cello

Konstantin Evtimov is а Bulgarian cellist. He is a soloist with the Bulgarian National Radio Symphony Orchestra and a member of Ardenza Trio.

== Biography ==
Evtimov was born in Ruse, Bulgaria in 1975. He graduated from the College of Arts in Ruse and the Music Academy – Sofia in the cello class of Professor Bogomil Karakonov and in the Chamber music class of Professor Ventzeslav Nikolov.

He took part in the world tour of the Philharmonie der Nationen under Justus Frantz as a solo cellist.

He specialised with the famous German cellist Maria Kliegel in Essen, Germany. In 1996 he attended a master class in Bern with Conradin Brotbek.

Subsequently, he obtained concert and soloist diplomas at the High School of Music and Theater – Bern in the cello class of Professor Conradin Brotbek.

He participated in master classes given by cellists such as Arto Noras, Robert Cohen, Martti Rousi and Young-Chang Cho.

In 1998 he began playing in the Symphonic orchestra of Lausanne. Two months later he was nominated for a solo cello position in the same orchestra. At the same time he met Pierre Amoyal, who invited him to become the solo celloist of Camerata de Lausanne.

He was a featured soloist at music festivals in France, Germany, Ireland, Austria, Japan, etc.

Evtimov performed as a soloist in many orchestras, including the London Philharmonic Orchestra, the Bern, Graz, Sofia and Lausanne Symphonic Orchestras and has given recitals in cities all around the world, including London, Tokyo, and Dublin, Ireland.

He took part in chamber formations with Mstislav Rostropovich, Shlomo Mintz, Yuri Bashmet, Pierre Amoyal, Jorg Demus, etc. He recorded for ARD, ZDF, radio Espace 2 CH, radio ТSR – 1 CH, Radio Camerata – Tokio, National Radio of Bulgaria, Bulgarian and Argentinian television.

He was the principal cellist of Camerata de Lausanne under Pierre Amoyal for 7 years. From 1998 to 2008 he was a solo violoncello of Sinfonietta de Lausanne.

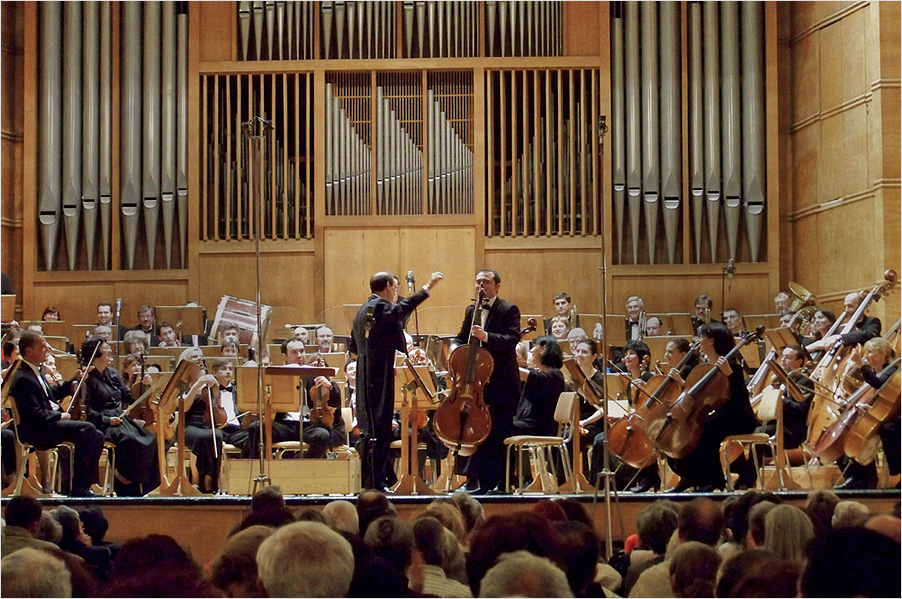

In 2008 he returned to Bulgaria. He left his post in Sinfonietta de Lausanne and undertook soloist activity in Bulgaria. In January 2009 he was invited to play at the opening of Chamber Music Festival Sofia, dedicated to the 130th anniversary since Sofia was 'crowned' as Bulgaria's capital. In January 2010 he was invited to play with Theodosii Spassov at a concert dedicated to the 75th anniversary of the Bulgarian National Radio. The occasion took place on the stage of the Bulgarian National Theatre "Ivan Vazov".

Since 2009 he has been a solo violoncello of the Symphonic Orchestra of the Bulgarian National Radio. Since 2014 he has been a member of Ardenza Trio with Daniela Dikova, piano, and the solo violin of the Symphonic Orchestra of the Bulgarian National Radio Galina Koycheva-Mircheva.

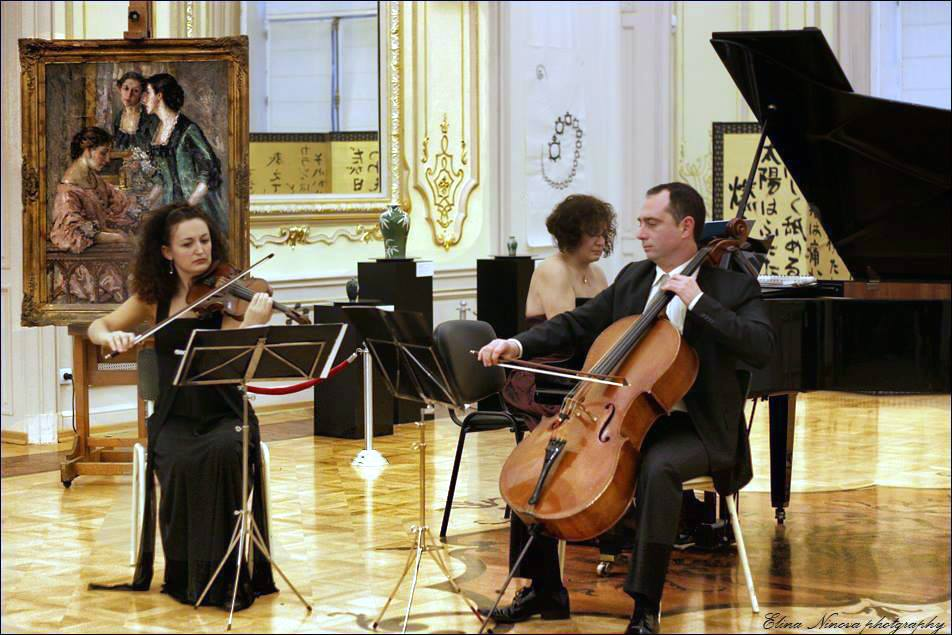
Ardenza Trio
