= Evtimov =

Evtimov is a surname. Notable people with the surname include:

- Anton Evtimov (born 1973), Bulgarian former footballer
- Dimitar Evtimov (born 1993), Bulgarian footballer
- Gancho Evtimov (born 1969), Bulgarian former footballer
- Ilian Evtimov (born 1983), Bulgarian professional basketball player
- Konstantin Evtimov (born 1975), Bulgarian cellist
- Vassil Evtimov (born 1977), French-Bulgarian retired professional basketball player
