= Sauerländer Heimatbund =

German Organisation

Cover of magazin in 2006

The Sauerländer Heimatbund (English: Sauerland Home Federation) (Note: Heimat is a German word that has no simple English translation. It is often expressed with terms such as home or homeland, but these English counterparts fail to encapsulate centuries of German consciousness and the thousands of connections this quintessential aspect of German identity carries with it.) is a non-profit NGO in Germany. Their purpose is to adhere to and honour the cultural roots, heritage and traditions the Sauerland area. It was founded in 1921 in Meschede.

== History ==
The organisation was founded by the Roman Catholic priest Franz Hoffmeister as a community of traditional students. Like similar organisations in Germany, it was founded because of the experiences of World War I. During the Third Reich activities were interrupted. Specific aspects of Heimat — love and attachment to homeland and the rejection of anything foreign — left the idea vulnerable to easy assimilation into the fascist "blood and soil" literature of the National Socialists.

== Bylaws ==
The registered voluntary association has over 3,000 members. As in all other German associations of this type, an annual meeting is compulsory. In the 21st century annual meetings were held in Balve (2004), Meschede (2005), Arnsberg (2006) and Allendorf (2007),

== Notable members ==
- Theodor Pröpper (1896–1979), composer
- Franz Lenze (1910–2005), politician
- Friedhelm Ackermann (1934–2006), photographer
- Werner Ahrens, designer

== Chairman ==
- Elmar Reuter

== Literature ==
- Landeskundliche Schriftenreihe für das kurkölnische Sauerland. Darin u.a.:
  - Helmut Müller (Bearb.): Die Urkunden des Klosters Bredelar. Fredeburg, 1994.
  - Manfred Wolf (Bearb.) : Die Urkunden des Klosters Oelinghausen : Regesten. Fredeburg, 1992
- Sauerland : Zeitschrift des Sauerländer Heimatbundes
- Erika Richter: 75 Jahre Sauerländer Heimatbund. In: Sauerland 29/1996. S.123-159
- Dieter Wurm: 85 Jahre Sauerländer Heimatbund. In: Sauerland 3/2006. S.107
- Sauerland, Zeitschrift des Sauerländer Heimatbundes, Publisher: Sauerländer Heimatbund
