= Theater Saarbrücken =

Theater in Saarbrücken, Saarland, Germany

Saarländisches Staatstheater
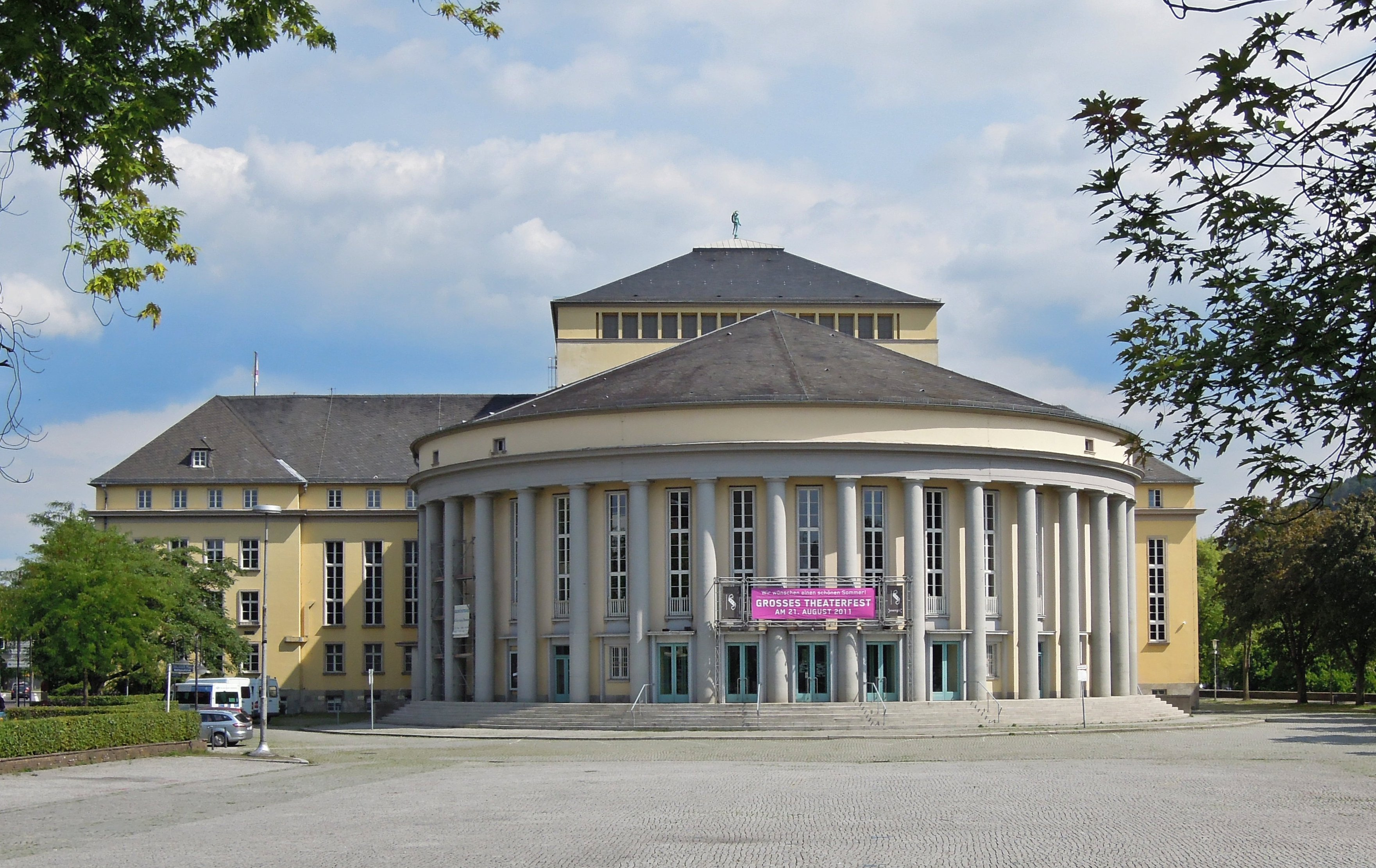
- Interactive map of Saarländisches Staatstheater
- Former names: Gautheater Saarpfalz; Stadttheater Saarbrücken
- Location: Saarbrücken, Germany
- Coordinates: 49°13′51″N 6°59′46″E
- Event: Theatre

Construction
- Built: 1937–1938
- Opened: 9 October 1938
- Architects: Paul Baumgarten; Gottfried Böhm

Website
- www.staatstheater.saarland

Theater Saarbrücken, officially Saarländisches Staatstheater since 1971, is the state theatre of Saarland in its capital Saarbrücken, Germany. It has several divisions (opera, drama, dance, concert) and offers annually around 30 new productions in around 700 events for more than 200,000 people. Its venues are Großes Haus (Big House), Alte Feuerwache (Old Fire Station), Congresshalle (Conference Hall) and sparte4 (area 4). While theatre in Saarbrücken has a long history, the present main venue was completed in 1938, with plans commissioned by the Nazi regime.

== History ==
Saarbrücken had several venues for theatre before the French Revolution, a theatre at the Schloss Saarbrücken, a comedy house from 1787, and an open-air theatre on the Ludwigsberg. August Wilhelm Iffland was director of the court theatres from 1786 to 1793.

During the following period as part of Prussia, there was no venue for theatre. In 1897, the Saalbau was built as a concert hall. A municipal theatre was built by Hans Peter Weszkalnys and opened on 18 February 1897 with the opera Mignon by Ambroise Thomas. From 1899, it was called Thalia-Theater. In 1906, plans for a better building began.

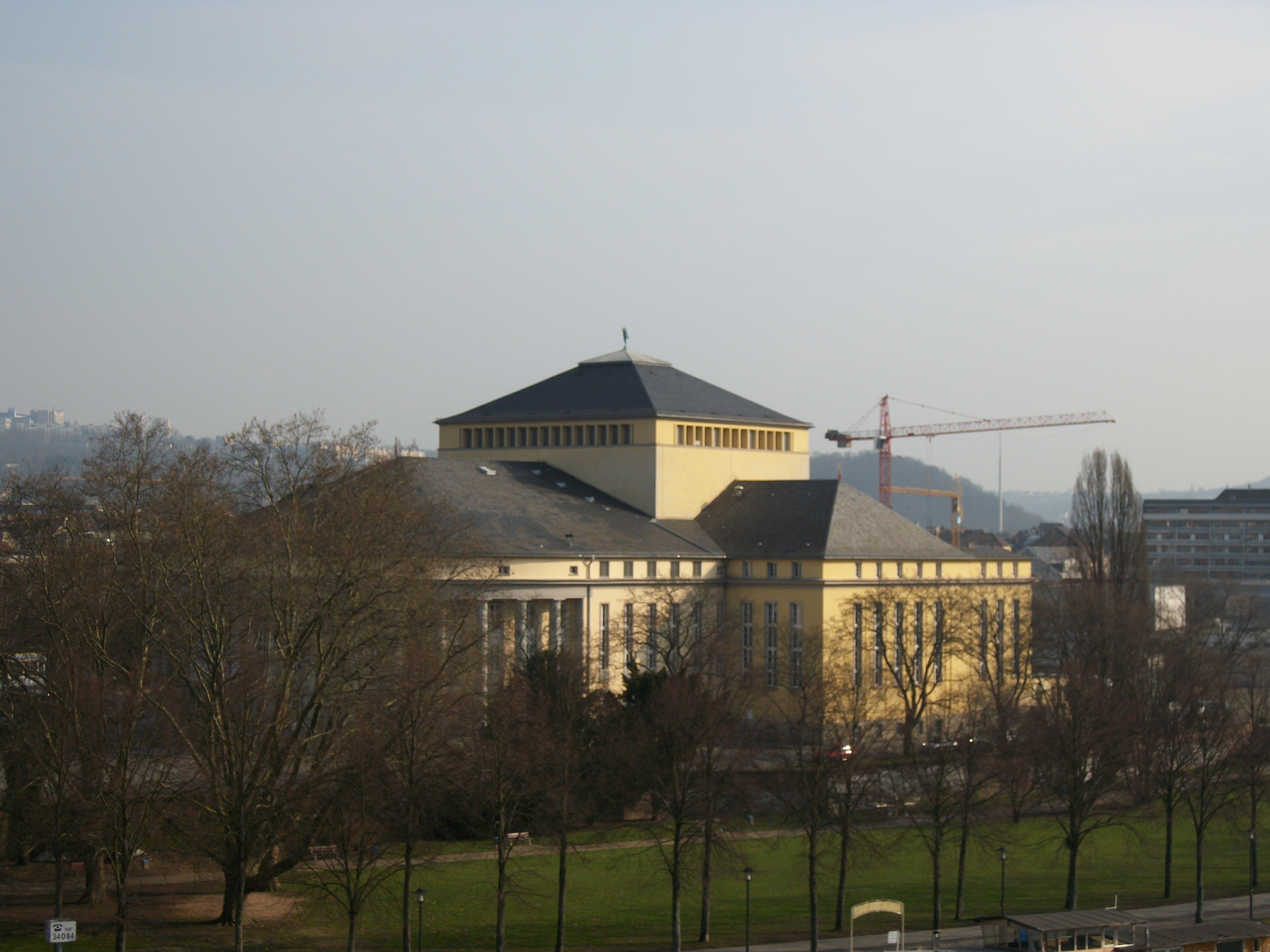
Staatstheater

The main venue of today's Saarländisches Staatstheater was built in 1937 and 1938, commissioned by Joseph Goebbels and designed by Paul Baumgarten. The funding came mostly from the city of Saarbrücken. It was opened on 9 October 1938, called Gautheater Saarpfalz, with a performance of Wagner's Der fliegende Holländer, in the presence of Hitler, Goebbels and Heinrich Himmler. The first Intendant was Bruno von Niessen. Heinz Bongartz was Generalmusikdirektor from 1937 to 1944.

Destroyed in World War II, the theatre was restored, and opened again on 6 March 1948, now named Stadttheater Saarbrücken (Saarbrücken City Theatre), with Mozart's Die Zauberflöte. When the Saar became part of the Federal Republic of Germany on 1 January 1957, the contract was signed at the theatre, with chancellor Konrad Adenauer and the prime minister of the Saar, Hubert Ney.

In 1971, the state of Saarland took over as owner of the theatre, and the name was changed to Saarländisches Staatstheater. The building was declared a historic monument in 1983. Bodo Busse has been the Intendant from the 2017/18 season.

== People ==
Among the people holding the position of Intendant (general manager) were:

- Hermann Wedekind (1960–1975)
- Martin Peleikis (1975–1991)
- Kurt Josef Schildknecht (1991–2006)
- Dagmar Schlingmann (2006–2017)
- Bodo Busse (from 2017)

Among the conductors were Siegfried Köhler and Laurent Wagner.

== See also ==
- List of productions of Swan Lake derived from its 1895 revival
