= Hermann Wedekind =

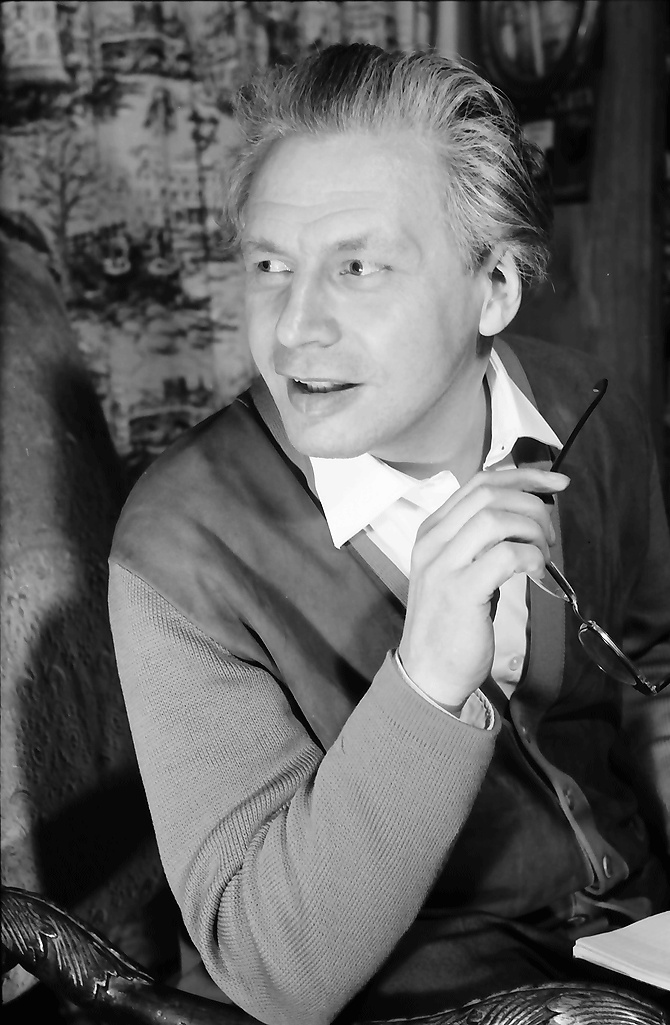
Hermann Wedekind, Ausdrucksstudien 1958, Landesarchiv Baden-Württemberg, Fotograf: Willy Pragher

Hermann Wedekind (18 November 1910, in Coesfeld, Westphalia – 16 January 1998, in Wadern) was an artistic director at Festspiele Balver Höhle from 1983 to 1996.

== Vita ==
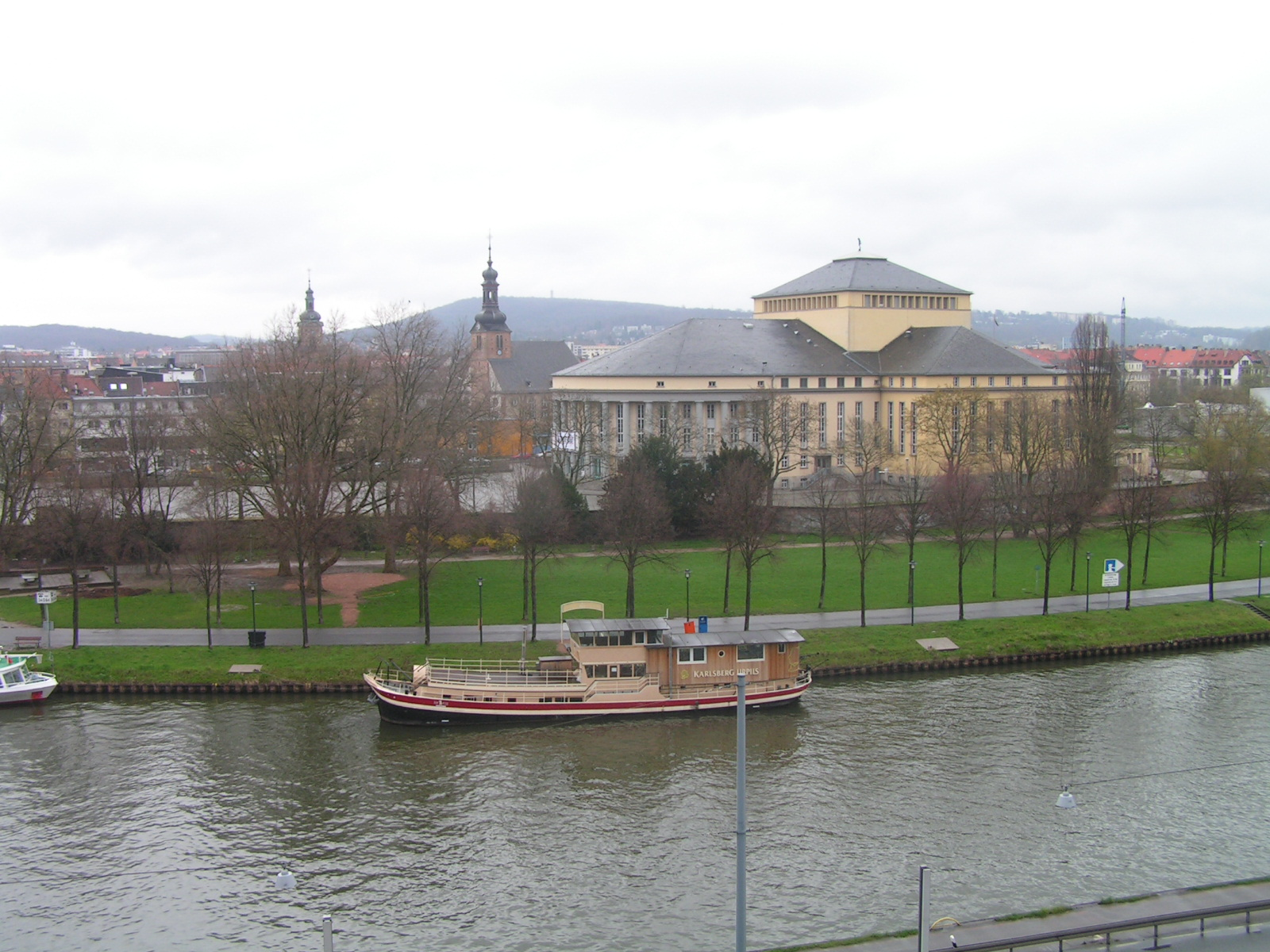
Theatre Saarbrücken

After his first engagements in Hagen and Bielefeld, Wedekind was brought to the Deutsches Theater in Berlin by the artistic director Heinz Hilpert in 1935 (1935–1943) and began a career in the field of youthful hero tenors at the Danzig Opera and then at the Dresden State Opera. After the war, he became senior director in Bonn from 1946 to 1950, built the theater in Münster, and headed the theater in Basel from 1954. In 1960, he took over the management of the city theater and later Saarland State Theatre in Saarbrücken. He was artistic director at Festspiele Balver Höhle from 1983 to 1996.

Wedekind was married to the actress Grete Schaun (1911–2007). The director Michael Wedekind is a son. His daughter Claudia Wedekind died in 2015.

== Works (selection) ==
- 1949: Das Balver Zeitwendspiel (Theodor Pröpper)
- 1950 / 1995: Das große Welttheater, as director
- 1984–1986: Katharina von Georgien
- 1995: Robin Hood, as artistic director

== Honors ==
- Albert-Schweitzer-Friedenspreis (1982)
- Bundesverdienstkreuz (1984)
- Saarland Order of Merit (1986)
- Honorary citizen of Georgia (1995)
- Kulturpreis North Rhine-Westphalia (1995)

== Literature ==
- Wedekind, Hermann; Garber, Hein; Gvenetadze, Tamaz (1997). Hermann Wedekind erzählt sein Leben (in German). Blieskastel: Gollenstein. ISBN 3-930008-68-8. OCLC 42211952.
