= Balve Optimum =

Show jumping event

The Balve Optimum is a tournament between horse riders (CSI/CDI) in Balve. It is placed at Balve Wocklum, the home of Dieter von Landsberg-Velen. The aligner are the Turniergemeinschaft Balve GmbH with its managing director Rosalie von Landsberg-Velen and the Reiterverein Balve with its chairman count Landsberg-Velen.

== History ==
The first riders tournament was organized in the year 1947.

== German championship 2008 ==
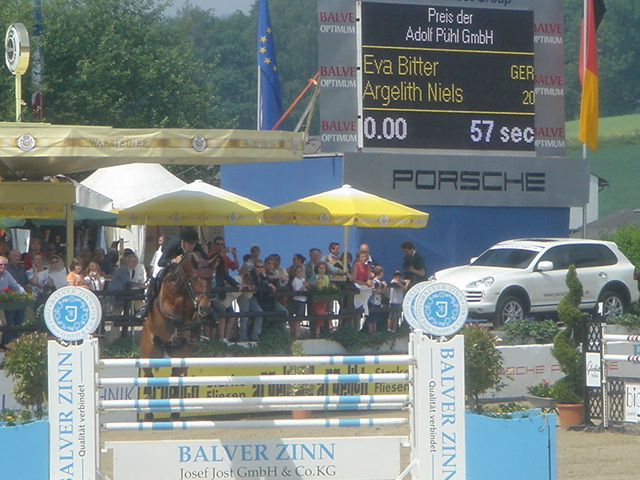
Eva Bitter

The winner of the German championship 2008 is:

Horse jumping

- Meredith Michaels-Beerbaum
- Eva Bitter

Dressage

- Isabell Werth
- Matthias Alexander Rath
