= Lisa Smirnova =

Austrian pianist, originally from Moscow (born 1972)

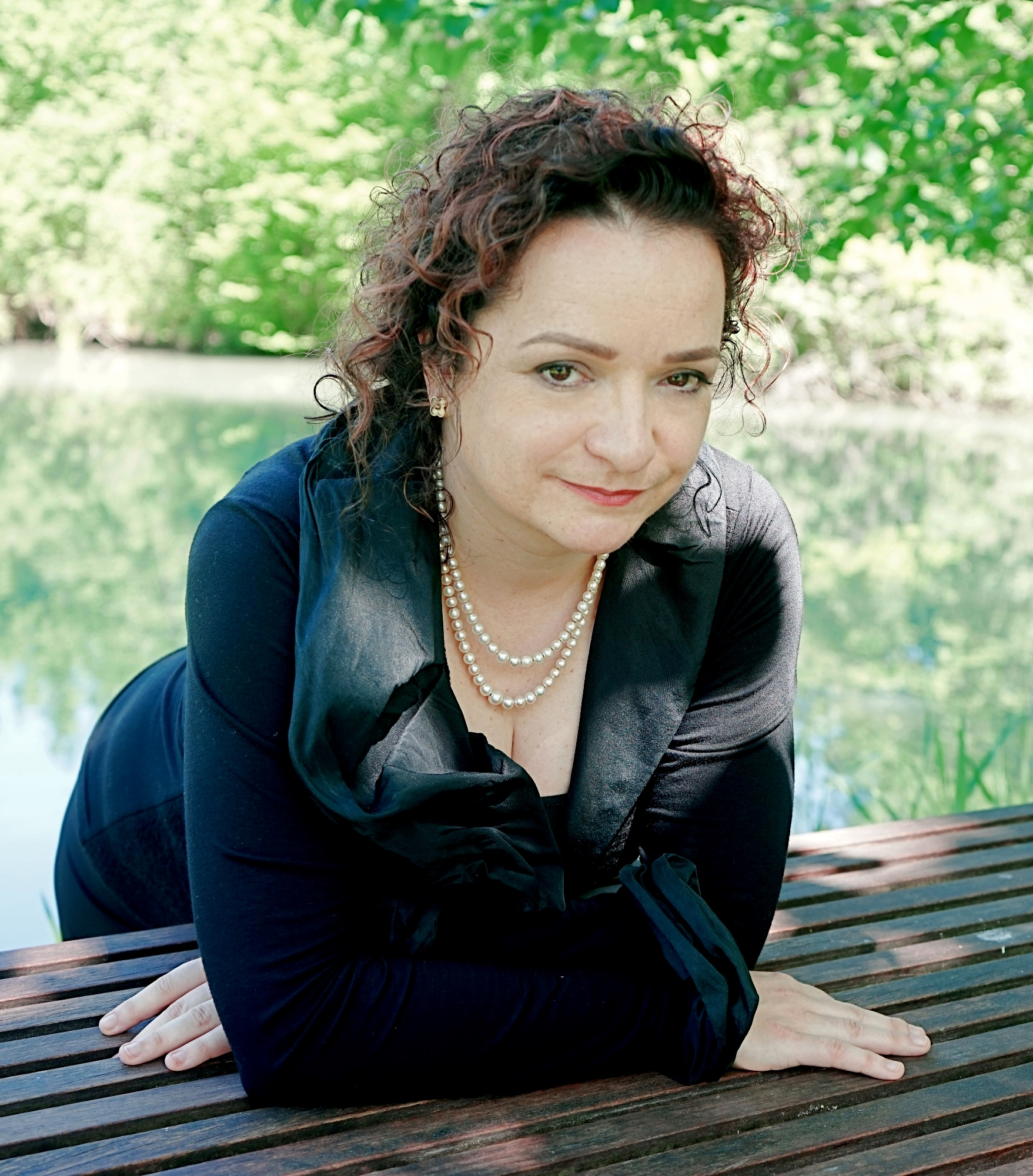
- Lisa Smirnova (2017)

Background information
- Born: August 6, 1972
- Genres: Classical
- Occupation: Pianist

Lisa Smirnova (born 6 August 1972) is an Austrian pianist, originally from Moscow.

== Biography ==
Smirnova took her first piano lesson with Anna Pavlovna Kantor at the Gnessin School in Moscow before being accepted into Lev Naumov's class at the Tchaikovsky Conservatory Moscow in 1990. In 1991, she began her studies at the Mozarteum Salzburg under Carl Heinz Kaemmerling, and in 1998 passed her final performance exams with distinction. Parallel to this, she expanded her studies under the tutelage of Maria Curcio and Robert Levin in London.

Her international career began in 1992 with her debut at Carnegie Hall. Since then, she has given performances in Europe, Asia, and the Americas, which were held in the Suntory Hall in Tokyo, the Wigmore Hall in London, the Wiener Musikverein, the Vienna Konzerthaus, the Concertgebouw in Amsterdam, and the Verdi Hall in Milan, among others. She is regularly the guest of such renowned music festivals as the Lucerne Festival, the Salzburg Festspielen, the Salzburg Mozart Week, the Schleswig-Holstein Musik Festival, and the styriarte Graz. Radio recordings have been made in Germany with ORF, BR, NDR, SDR, WDR, as well as with the BBC, NPR, and Radio France. Her broadcasts have been awarded with numerous prizes.

Smirnova has played under such notable conductors as Ivor Bolton, Andrey Boreyko, Manfred Honeck, Carlos Kalmar, Lev Markiz, Andres Mustonen, or John Storgårds, and with such orchestras as the Weimar State Kapelle, the German Chamber Academy of Neuss, the Jena Philharmonic, the Halle State Orchestra, the Georgian Chamber Orchestra Ingol City, the Wuerttemberg Philharmonic, the Salzburg Chamber Soloists, the Mozarteum Orchestra Salzburg, the Tonkunstler Orchestra of Lower Austria, the Vienna Chamber Orchestra, the Beethoven Academy Orchestra, the Varsovia Symphony, the Zagreb Philharmonic Orchestra, the RTV Slovenia Symphony Orchestra, the Belgrade Philharmonic, the Breslau Philharmonic W. Lutoslawski, the ProMusica Chamber Orchestra, and the Illinois Philharmonic. Chamber music partners have included, among others, Benjamin Schmid, Clemens Hagen, Sergei Nakariakov, Dmitry Sitkovetsky, Antje Weithaas, Thomas Zehetmair, as well as members of the Astor Piazzolla New Tango Quintett, the Belcanto String Trio, brass soloists of the Berlin Philharmonic, and the Leipzig String Quartet.

Smirnova, together with Andres Mustonen, founded in the New Classic Ensemble of Vienna in 2007, of which musicians Benjamin Ziervogel (violin), Werner Neugebauer (violin), Firmian Lermer (viola), Detlef Mielke (cello) and Herwig Neugebauer (bass) are members. Solos and performances of baroque and classical works make up the focus of this repertoire. Nevertheless, she additionally took up the position of Artistic Director of the Nagasaki-Ojika Music Festival in Japan from 2007 to 2012.

In addition to giving concerts, Smirnova is committed to music appreciation and to supporting the next generation of musicians. Between 2002 and 2015 she held master classes on a yearly basis in Germany, Austria, and Japan. In addition, she was given a teaching position in 2007 from the University Mozarteum in Salzburg when she was assistant to the class of professor Karl-Heinz Kaemmerling. She also taught students at the Leopold Mozart Institute for the Gifted until 2009. From 2010 to 2015 she was the Artistic Director of Razumovsky Music Academy of Vienna, which she founded and which supports the development of gifted children and young people. In 2016 she accepted an offer from the Robert Schumann Music School in Düsseldorf where she is a professor of piano performance and Managing Director of the Learning Center Schumann Junior.

Smirnova's forte lies in baroque and Viennese classical works. Additionally, she holds great interest for innovative, interdisciplinary projects, and for unconventional concert forms.

== Prizes and awards ==
- 2012: Instrumental Choice from the BBC Music Magazine for the performance of Handel's The Eight Great Suites.
- 2005: Diapason 5 for the performance of J.S. Bach's Six Sonatas and Partitas with Benjamin Schmid (violin) with Piano Accompaniment by R. Schumann.
- 1997: Editor's Choice from SoundScapes Magazine Australia for the performance of N. Paganini's 24 Caprice for Violin with Piano Accompaniment by R. Schumann (with Benjamin Schmid, violin)
- 1993: Brahms Prize from Schleswig-Holstein Music Festival
- 1993: Concourse Haydn Schubert de Sarrebourg
- 1992: International Keyboard/Piano Competition Cologne – Tomassoni Foundation
- 1992: Missouri International Piano Competition
- 1991: Citta di Marsala

== Discography ==
- L. van Beethoven: Sonata no. 32 op. 111, Prokofiev: Sonata No. 8 op. 84 (live at the Concertgebouw Amsterdam), Paladino Music 2016
- D. Shostakovich: Preludes; Prokofiev: Visions Fugitives; Weill: 7 Pieces from the „Threepenny Opera” (with Benjamin Schmid, violin), Ondine 2015
- G.F. Handel: The Eight Great Suites, ECM New Series 2011/2012
- J. S. Bach: Six Sonatas & Partitas for Violin with Piano accompaniment by Robert Schumann (with Benjamin Schmid, violin), 1995/2010 MDG, World Premiere Recording
- One lives but ones, waltzes for piano solo, waltzes by Chopin, Schubert, Strauss/Tausig, Tchaikovsky, Scriabin, Ravel, Satie; Oehms Classics 2003
- Piéces de Concert, concert and encore pieces by Milhaud, Ravel, Brahms, Saint-Saëns, Bazzini, Tchaikovsky (with Benjamin Schmid, violin); Oehms Classics 2003
- E. Bloch: Suite Hebraique, Complete Works for Viola and Piano (with Daniel Raiskin, viola), BMG / Arte Nova Classics 2003
- Oblivion – tangos by Astor Piazzolla, (with the Okoun Ensemble), BMC 2001
- J. Haydn: Piano Concertos, Hob.XVIII:3, XVIII:4, XVIII:11, (with the Varsovia Symphony und V. Schmidt-Gertenbach) BMG / Arte Nova Classics 1997
- L. van Beethoven, Piano Concertos Nos. 1 and 3 (with the Jena Philharmonic and David Montgomery) BMG / Arte Nova Classics 1996
- N. Paganini, 24 Caprices for Violin with piano accompaniment by Robert Schumann (with Benjamin Schmid, violin), MDG Gold 1996
- W.A. Mozart, Sonatas KV 19d, 123a, 186c, 497 for four Hands (with Christian Hornef), BMG / Arte Nova Classics 1995
