= Brahms-Preis =

German music award

- Awarded for: "Artists who have contributed outstanding work to the preservation of the artistic heritage of Johannes Brahms."
- Sponsored by: Karl Uwe Böttcher
- Location: Schleswig-Holstein
- Country: Germany
- Presented by: Brahms-Gesellschaft
- Reward: €10,000
- First award: 1988
- Website: brahms-sh.de/brahmspreis/

The Brahms-Preis (Brahms Prize) has been awarded by the Brahms Society of Schleswig-Holstein since 1988. The prize is furnished with 10,000 euros. It rewards artists who have contributed mesmerizing work for the preservation of the artistic heritage of Johannes Brahms.

== Winners ==
- 1988: Leonard Bernstein and the Vienna Philharmonic, conductor/orchestra
- 1990: Yehudi Menuhin, violinist and conductor
- 1993: Lisa Smirnova, pianist
- 1994: Philharmonie der Nationen (Philharmonic of the Nations), orchestra
- 1995: Hanno Müller-Brachmann, bass-baritone
- 1996: Professors Renate and Kurt Hofmann, Brahms-Institut Lübeck
- 1997: Detlef Kraus, pianist
- 1998: Dietrich Fischer-Dieskau, baritone
- 1999: Stephan Genz, baritone
- 2000: Christian Tetzlaff, violinist
- 2001: Sabine Meyer, clarinetist
- 2002: Thomanerchor, choir
- 2003: Manfred Sihle-Wissel, sculptor
- 2004: Lars Vogt, pianist
- 2005: Dresdner Kreuzchor, choir
- 2006: Musikhochschule Lübeck, Brahms-Institut
- 2007: Thomas Quasthoff, baritone
- 2008: Simone Young and the Hamburg Philharmonic, conductor/orchestra
- 2009: Gerhard Oppitz, pianist
- 2011: Anne-Sophie Mutter, violinist
- 2012: Fauré Quartet, piano quartet
- 2013: Matthias Janz and the Flensburger Bach-Chor, conductor/choir
- 2014: Johannes Moser, cellist, and Benjamin Moser, pianist
- 2015: Thomas Hengelbrock, conductor
- 2016: Christoph Eschenbach, pianist and conductor
- 2017: Herbert Blomstedt, conductor
- 2018: Christiane Karg, soprano
- 2019: Pieter Wispelwey, cellist, and Paolo Giacometti, pianist
- 2020: Midori, violinist
- 2023: Friederike Woebcken and the Madrigalchor Kiel, conductor/choir
- 2024: Kent Nagano, conductor
- 2025: Windsbacher Knabenchor, choir
- 2026: Mandelring Quartet, string quartet
