= Theodor Pröpper =

German composer and church musician

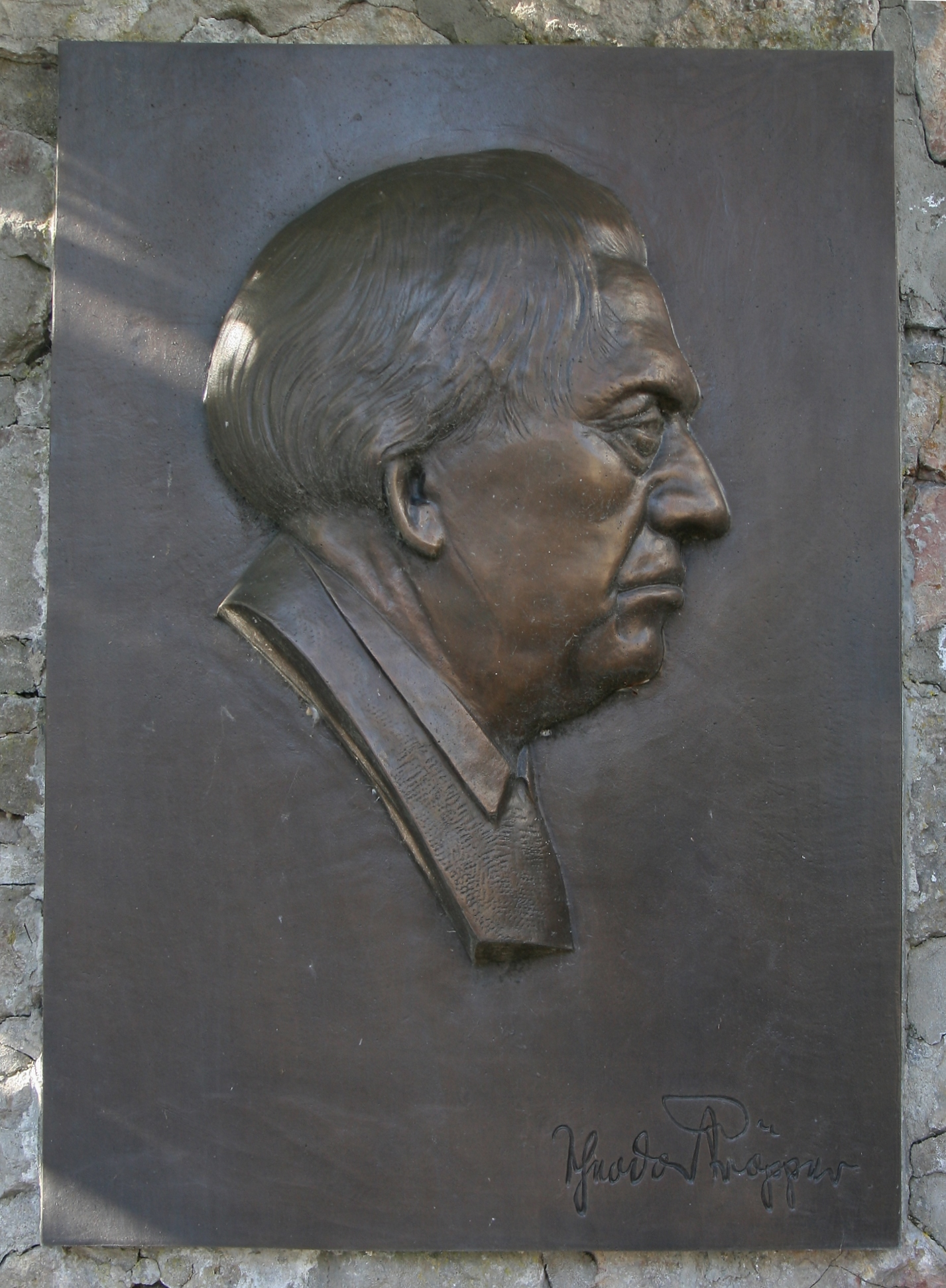
Theodor Pröpper

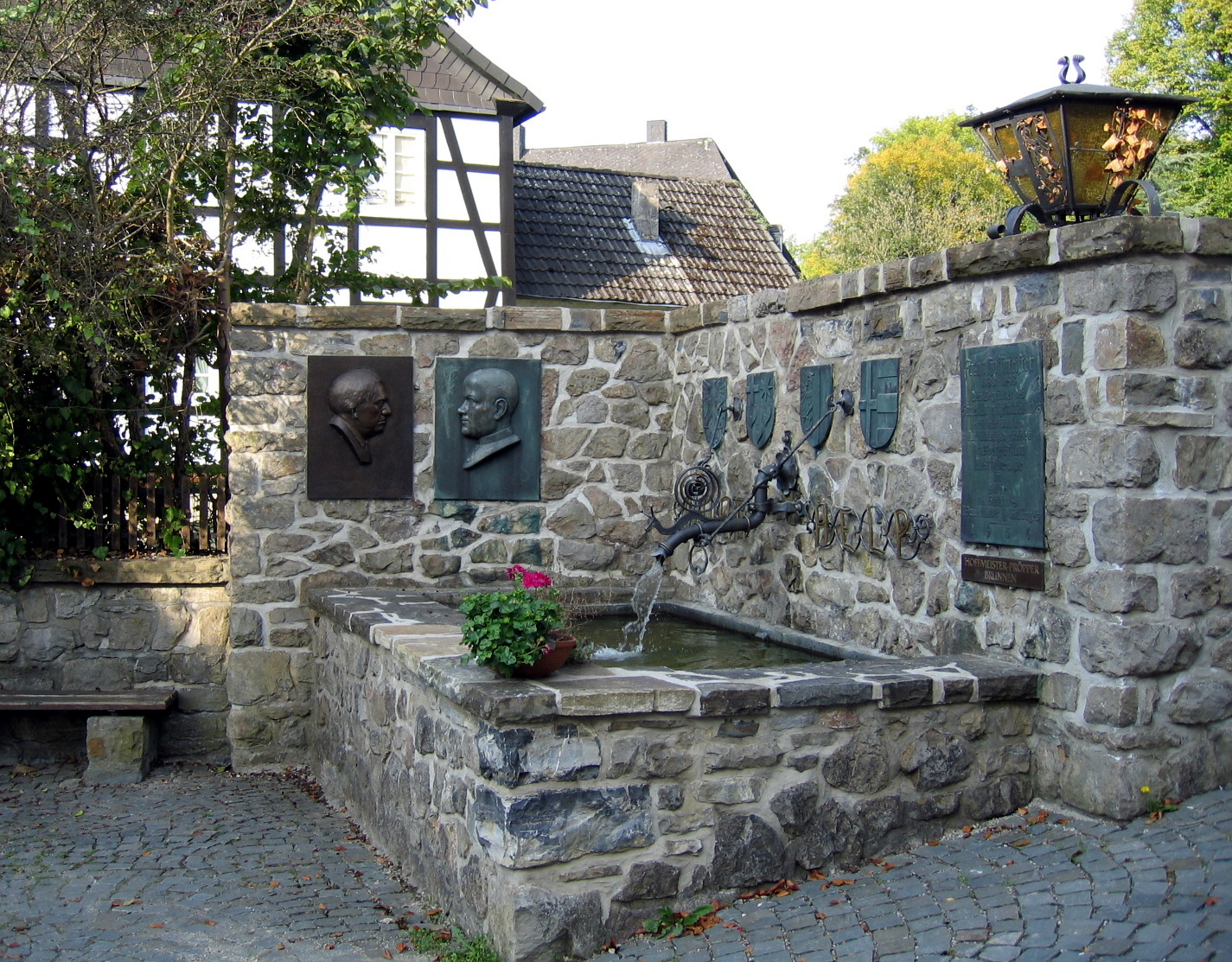
Fountain in memory of Theodor Pröpper and Franz Hoffmeister, Balve

Theodor Pröpper (26 May 1896 – 31 July 1979) was a German church organist and composer. Pröpper was born in Balve and spent most of his career there as an organist at Saint Blasius church.

== Career ==
Pröpper studied at the church music school in Paderborn from 1912 to 1914, after which he became organist at the St. Blaise parish church in Balve.

He later studied at the State Academy of Music in Munich (with Joseph Haas among his teachers) and also had private composition lessons from Gottfried Rüdinger, returning to Balve in 1925. From 1930 to 1934 he held a position in the local government but was removed by the Nazis. In February 1946 he became deputy mayor of Balve.

Pröpper received a number of church honours and appointments throughout his career. In 1966 he was awarded the Federal Cross of Merit (first class) and in 1974, the Orlando di Lasso medal.

He died in Balve and was buried there.

== Volunteering ==
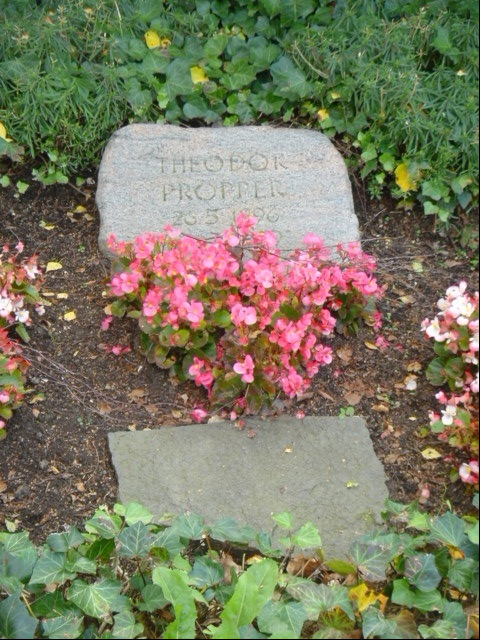
Grave marker

Theodor Pröpper was the co-founder of Sauerländer Heimatbund.

== Selected works ==
- Tu es Petrus, cantata
- Johanneskantate, cantata
- Klingemund, songbook
- Das Balver Zeitwendspiel, drama
- Franz Hoffmeister. Leben und Werk, Verlag Bonifatius Druckerei, Paderborn 1949

== Recordings ==
- Tu es Petrus (op. 26) Märkisches Jugendsinfonieorchester and Oratorienchor Letmathe, director: Gerhard Michalski, recorded by Johannes Freiherr von Linden, mpc records 58802002, in cooperation with Festspiele Balver Höhle

Naira Gloudschadze (soprano)
Marie-Helen Joel (contralto)
Terence Vanden Berg (tenor)
Dieter Goffing (bass)
Gebhard Reichmann (organ)
