= Balve =

- Town
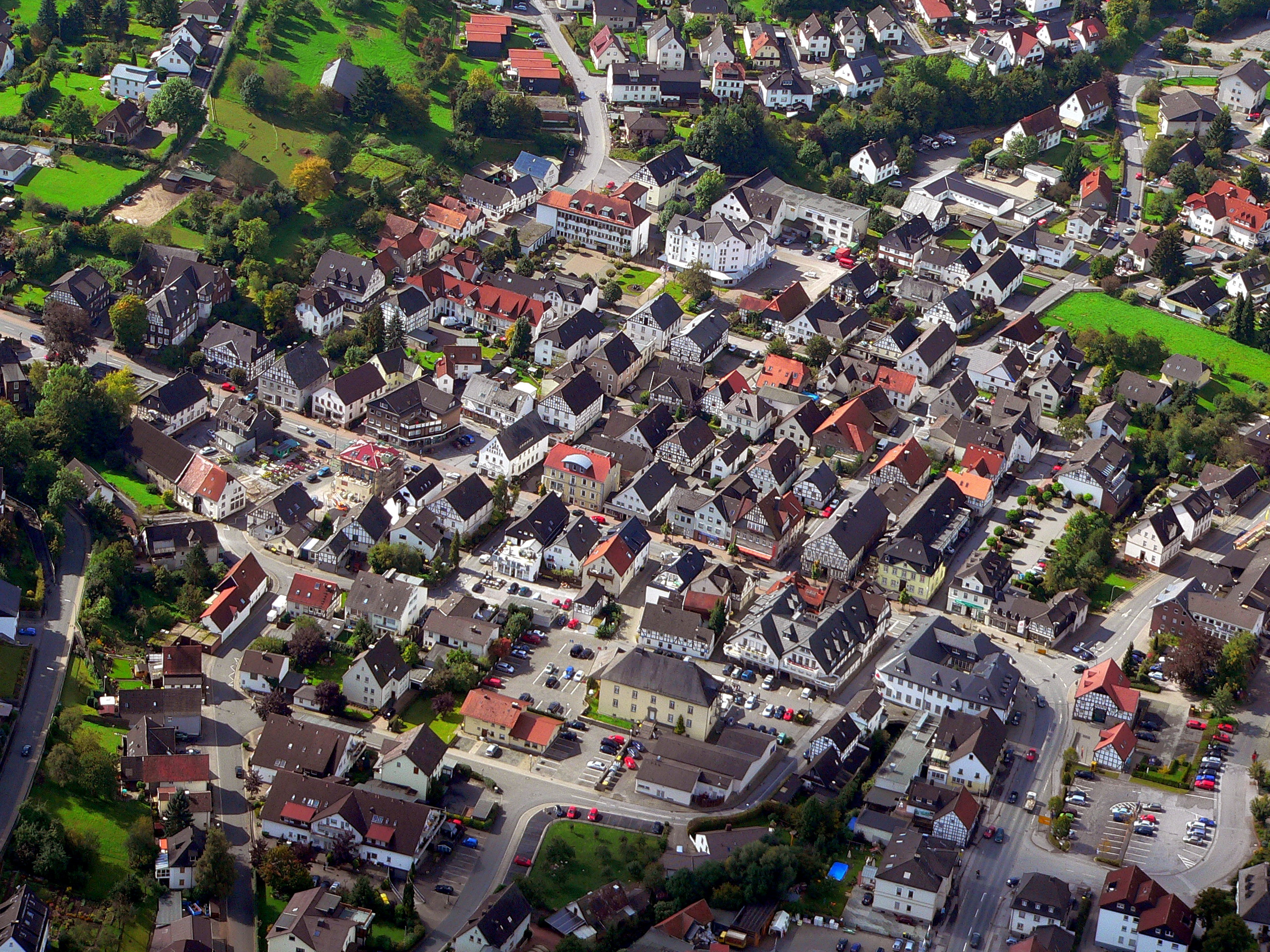
- Balve town centre in 2007

- Coat of arms

- Location of Balve within Märkischer Kreis district
- Interactive map of Balve
- Location within Germany Location within North Rhine-Westphalia
- Coordinates: 51°20′N 07°52′E
- Country: Germany
- State: North Rhine-Westphalia
- Admin. region: Arnsberg
- District: Märkischer Kreis
- Subdivisions: 7

Government
  - Mayor (2025–30): Hubertus Mühling (CDU)

Area
  - Total: 74.81 km^{2} (28.88 sq mi)
- Elevation: 240–546 m (787–1,791 ft)

Population (2025-12-31)
  - Total: 11,134
  - Density: 148.8/km^{2} (385.5/sq mi)
- Time zone: UTC+01:00 (CET)
  - Summer (DST): UTC+02:00 (CEST)
- Postal codes: 58802
- Dialling codes: 02375
- Vehicle registration: MK
- Website: www.balve.de

Balve (German pronunciation: [ˈbalvə]) is a town in the Märkischer Kreis district, North Rhine-Westphalia, Germany. It is located in Hönnetal, a narrow valley created by the river Hönne, which is near the Sorpe Dam, formerly part of Balve, and at the north end of the Sauerland, near Dortmund. The town was established in 1975 with several divisions including Balve, Beckum and Eisborn and Garbeck.

== History ==
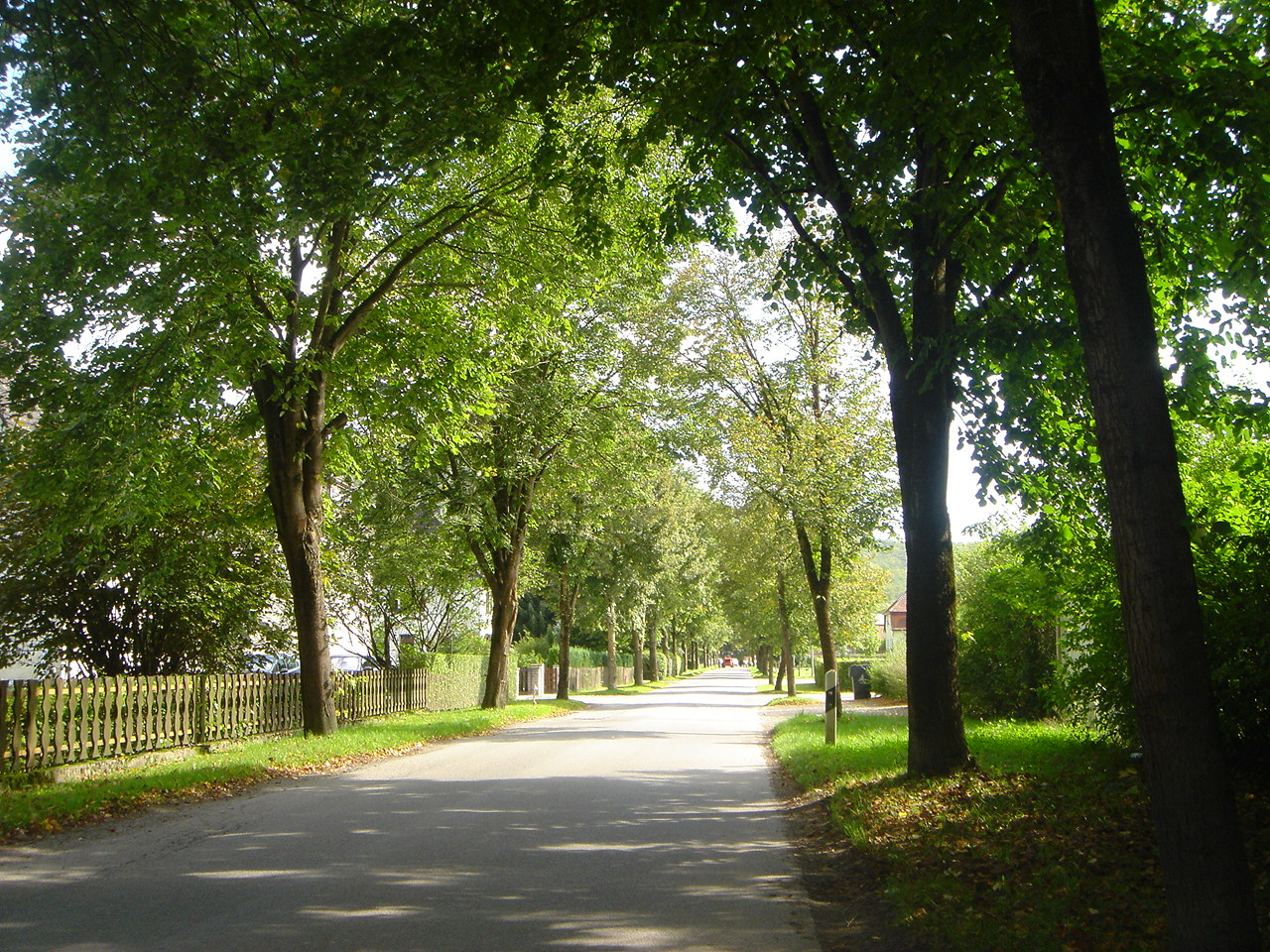
Avenue to Wocklum

The first reference to Balve is from around 780, when it was mentioned that a Widukind owned a farm called Ballowa, another name for the town, although this reference has been disputed. The first undisputed reference was in 864, in which a blind girl from Balve was said to be healed at the grave of the Saint Ludger in the crypt of Werden Abbey.

Ballowa is also mentioned in the Thidrekssaga, a chivalric saga written in the mid-13th century in Norway. In the saga, Ballowa is the home of two dwarfs who taught Weyland much about making iron weapons. At the time of writing, Balve belonged to the county of Arnsberg.

In 1358 the town became the property of the Duchy of Westphalia, which belonged to the Archbishops of Cologne. In 1430 it was given the right to be called a city. During the Napoleonic period, it belonged for a short time (1802–1815) to Hesse, after which time it became part of the Kingdom of Prussia.

In 1975, following a substantial reorganisation of local government in Germany, the city was enlarged by the addition of the several former independent municipalities from the abolished Amt Balve, including Asbeck, Beckum, and Eisborn.

== Population ==
Historical population

Year	Pop.	±% p.a.
1965	9,029	—
1970	9,839	+1.73%
1975	10,255	+0.83%
1980	10,759	+0.96%
1985	10,766	+0.01%
1990	11,416	+1.18%
1995	11,967	+0.95%

Year	Pop.	±% p.a.
2000	12,119	+0.25%
2005	12,162	+0.07%
2010	11,955	−0.34%
2015	11,602	−0.60%
2020	11,217	−0.67%
2025	11,134	−0.15%

Source: Landesdatabank Nordrhein-Westfalen

== Organizations, economy and transportation ==
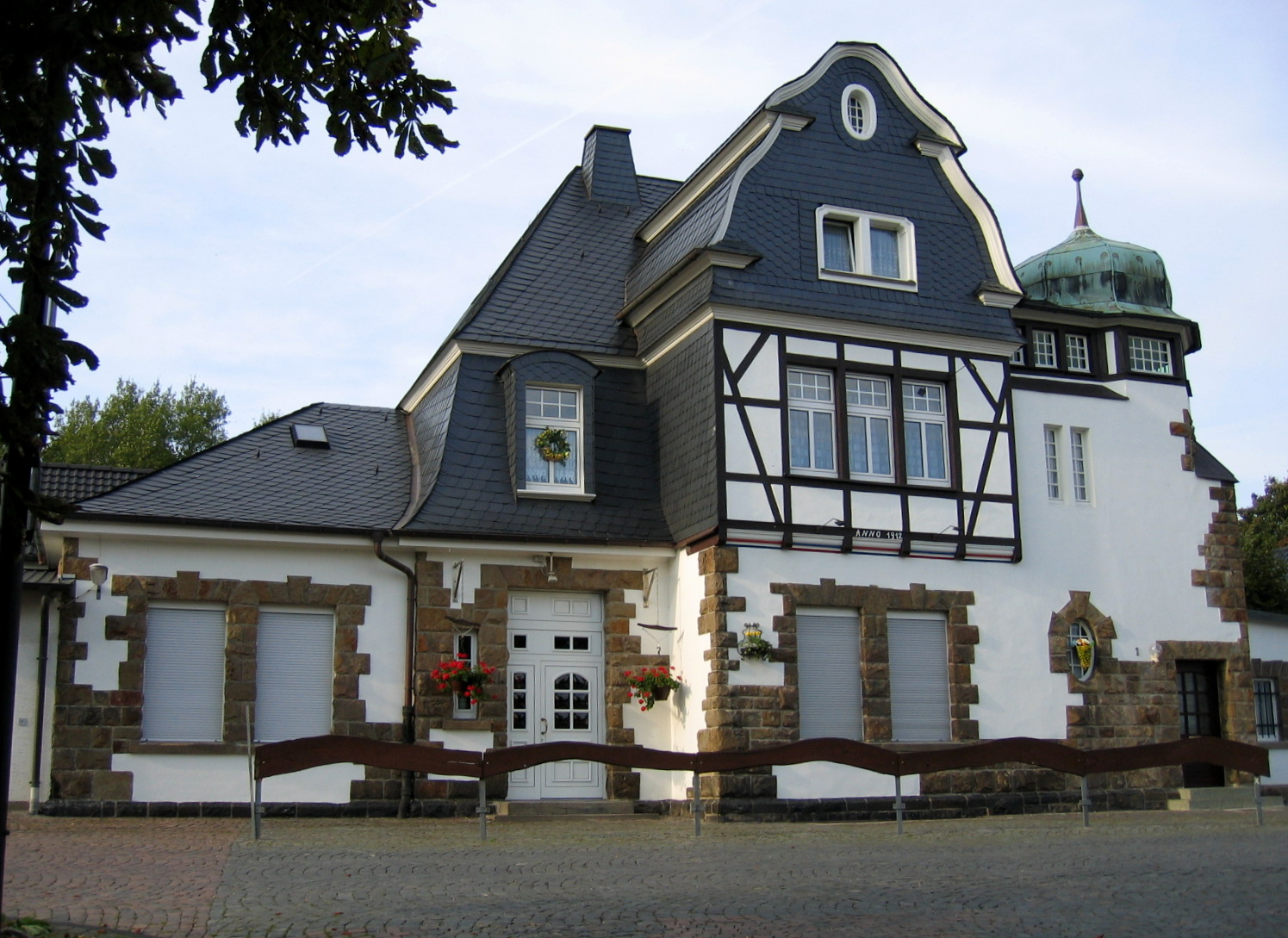
Building at the station

Local organizations include a Red Cross chapter, and the Schützenbruderschaft St. Sebastian Balve, founded in 1947. Primary schools in the town include Grundschule Balve and Grundschule Beckum. Several international companies have roots in the town, including Balver Zinn, Chemie Wocklum, and Kruse Group.

Train stations in Balve include Binolen, Volkringhausen, Sanssouci, Garbeck and Balve, the latter station part of the Hönnetalbahn (RB 54) line.

== Religion ==
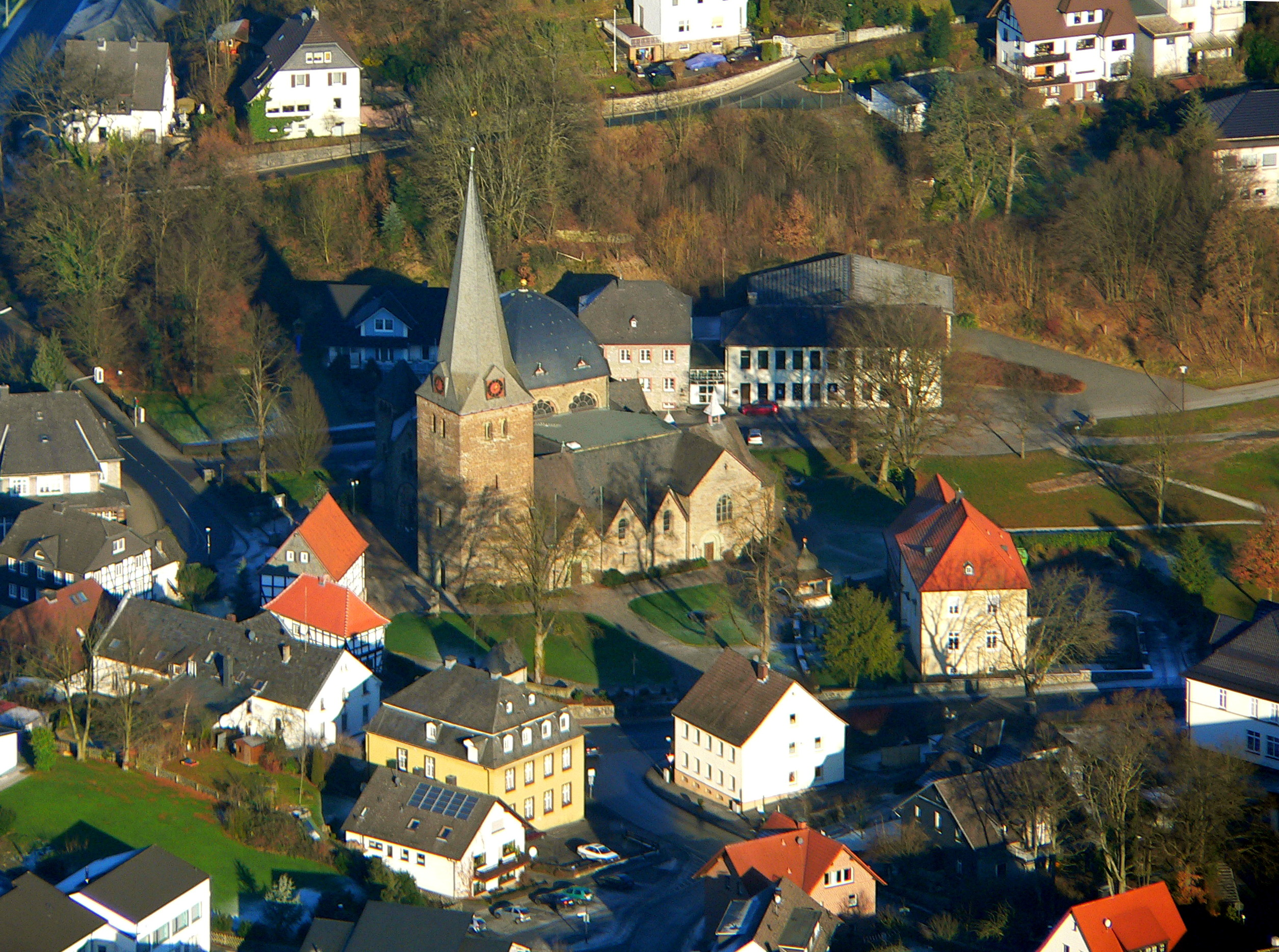
Saint Blaise church

The main religion in Balve is Roman Catholicism. The church Saint Blaise, built in the 12th century and an example of Romanesque architecture, was consecrated to Mary. On February 3 each year a special ceremony is held in the church, called the Blessing of the Throats. The altar servers of Saint Blaise visit other cities every year, for example Georgsmarienhütte in 1982. Bones from Benedict of Nursia and Saint Blaise, and a 400-year-old monument for Hermann von Hatzfeld, are located in the church. Additionally, two Roman Catholic parishes have been present in Balve for several years.

== Culture ==
=== Performing arts ===
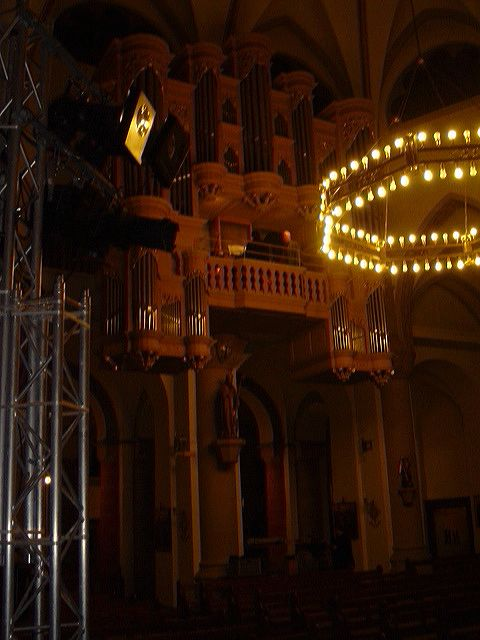
Jedermann (2005)

The Männerchor 1860 Balve is the largest choir in Balve. Other choirs include the Männerchor Garbeck and MC Cäcilia Volkringhausen. The town's bands include Musikverein Balve and Musikverein Garbeck.

Until 2005, the organization Festspiele Balver Höhle and the town of Balve have jointly hosted a jazz festival. Acts at the festival have included performances by Jan Garbarek and by Piirpauke.

=== Festivals ===
The Festspiele Balver Höhle is mainly held at the Balver Höhle, a cave in Balve. The festival is a major focus of the culture in and around the town, featuring music and theatre performances. Notable is the Irish Folk & Celtic Music. The only marksmen's festival, Schützenfest, is also held in this cave, and is organized by Schützenbruderschaft St. Sebastian.

A large bonfire on Easter Sunday is another tradition in Balve, organized by the Kolpingsfamilie Balve. On May 1 each year the fire brigade of Balve is invited to the Feuerwehrfest, and for 20 years a christmas market has organized by Balver Fachhandel.

== Politics ==
The current mayor of Balve is Hubertus Mühling of the CDU, who has been serving as mayor of Balve since 2004. In the 2025 local elections he was reelected with 67,4 % of votes.

=== City council ===
After the 2025 local elections, the Balve city council is composed as follows:

Party	Votes	%	+/-	Seats	+/-
Christian Democratic Union (CDU)	3,457	61.7	▲2.2	19	±0
Independent Voters' Association (UWG)	1,697	30.3	▲4.1	10	▲2
Social Democratic Party (SPD)	449	8.0	▼6.3	3	▼2
Valid votes	5,603	97.8			
Invalid votes	126	2.2			
Total	5,729	100.0		32	±0
Electorate/voter turnout	9,152	62.6			
Source: City of Balve

== Sports ==
One of the soccer clubs in Balve, SG Balve/Garbeck, won the DFB-Ü 40-Cup in 2007. The town also organizes the Balve Optimum, a competition between horse riders.

Participants in the Balve Optimum have included:

Horse jumping

- Reiner Klimke
- Paul Schockemöhle
- Ludger Beerbaum
- Markus Beerbaum
- Jessica Kürten (2007)
- Hugo Simon (2008)
- Meredith Michaels-Beerbaum (2008)
- Eva Bitter (2008)

Dressage

- Isabell Werth (2008)
- Matthias Alexander Rath (2008)

== Points of interest ==
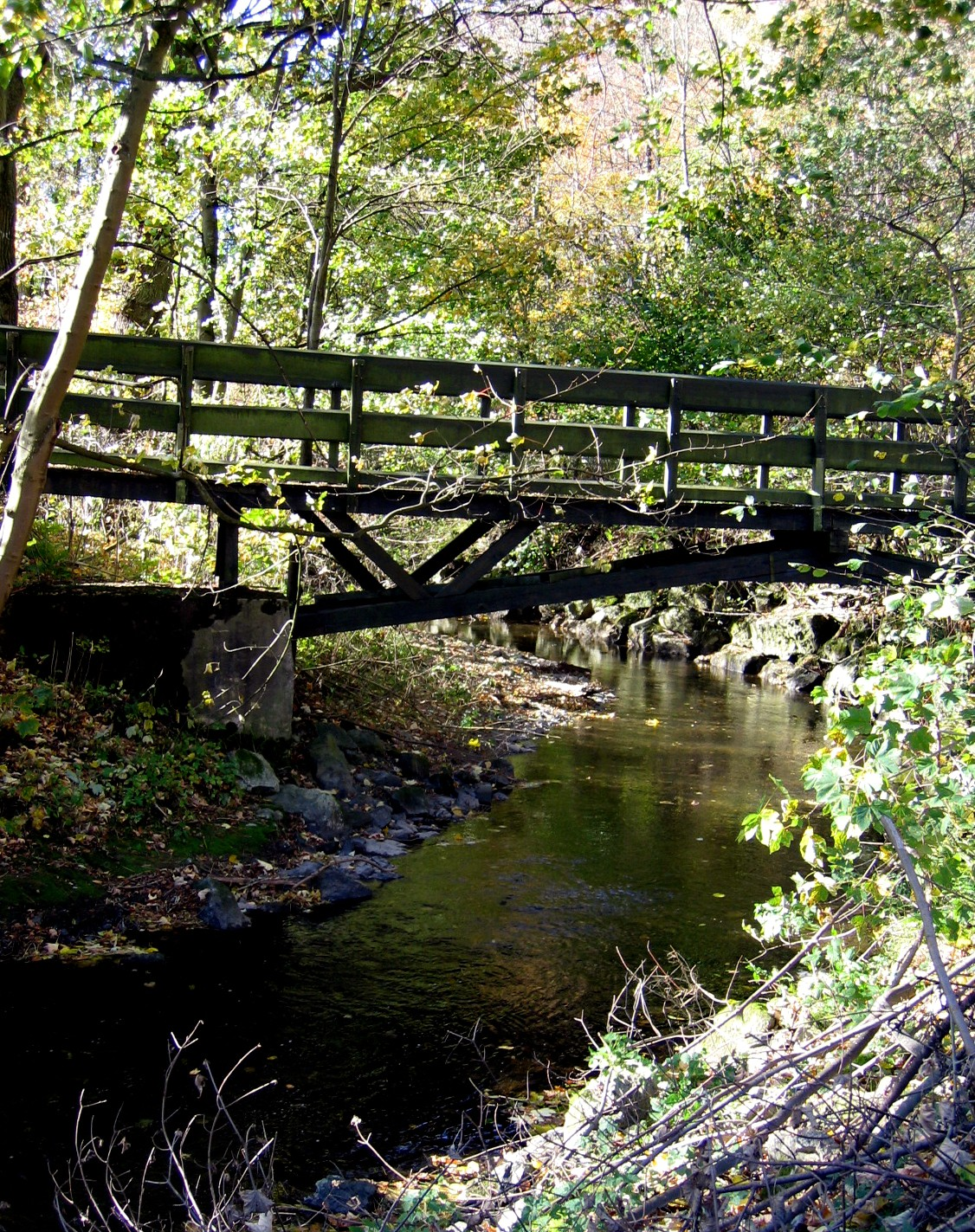
The Hönne at Balve

There are many caves in the Hönnetal, including the Balver Höhle at Helle, a large cave used for cultural events such as concerts, stage acting and the annual marksmen's festival, and the Reckenhöhle, a cave 1,478 ft in length that has flowstone. Experts have found signs of cannibalism in some of the caves.

Other points of interest include

1. The walls of an old Germanic farm, located Garbeck,
2. Beckum, where scientists found bones from eight kind of species of dinosaurs from the cretaceous, and
3. The Luisenhütte, the only surviving 18th-century blast furnace that is still in workable condition, situated close to the 14th-century castle Schloss Wocklum, the home of Count Dieter von Landsberg-Velen.
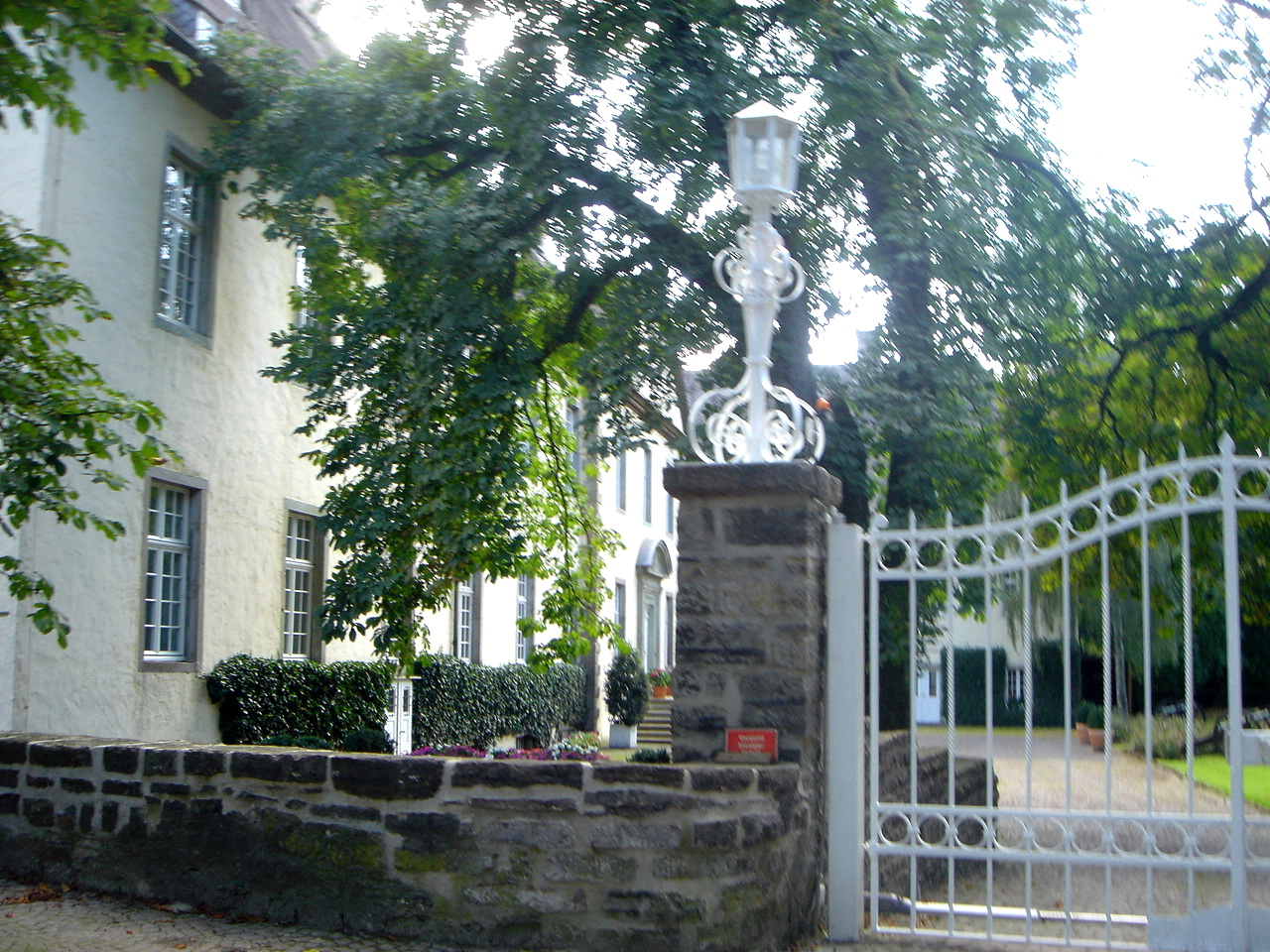
Schloss Wocklum

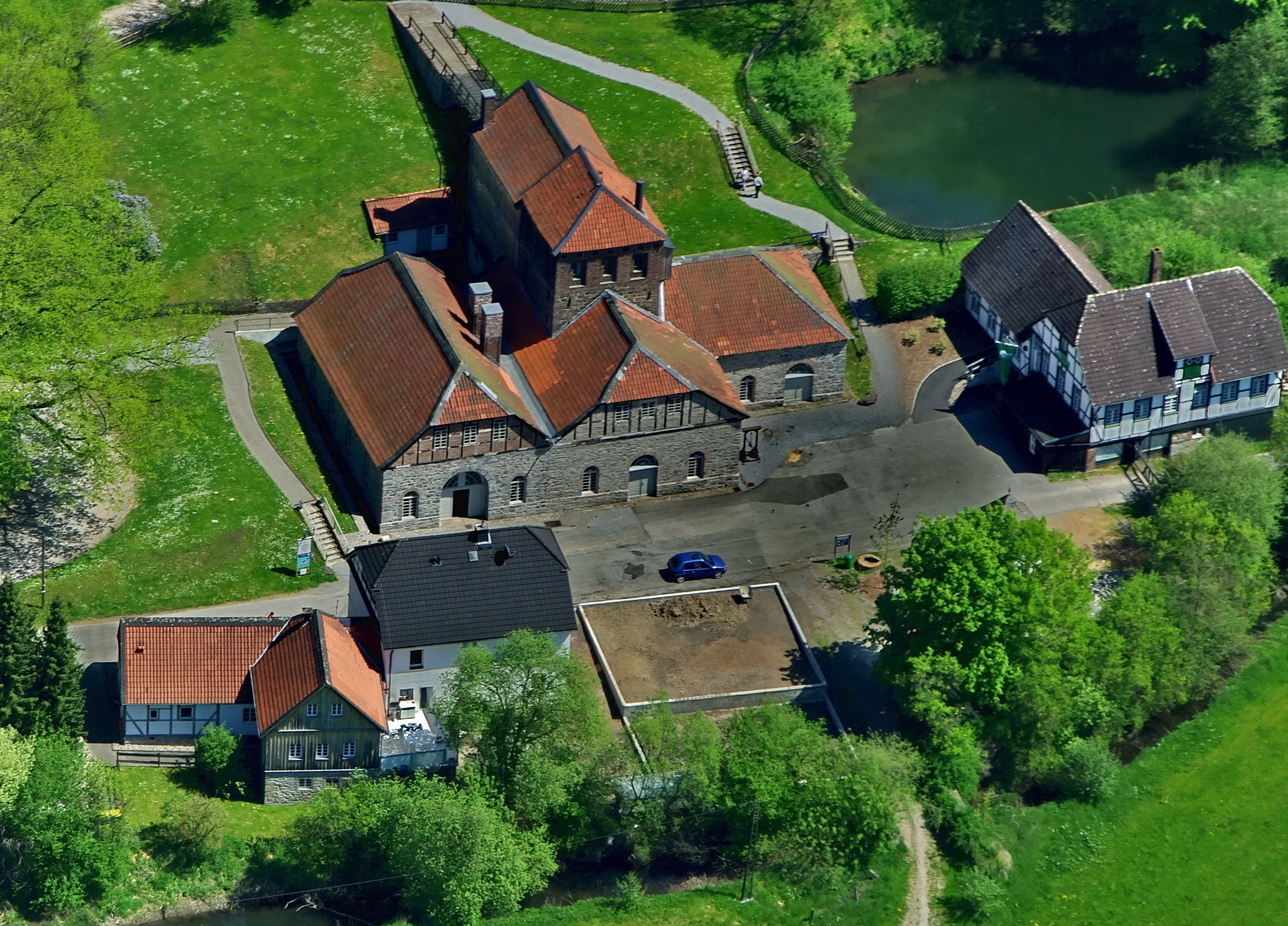
Luisenhütte

== Coat of arms ==
The town's coat of arms references the history of Balve. The eagle is taken from the arms of Arnsberg, and the black-and-white cross from that of Cologne. Both symbols were present in old seals of the city, of which the oldest known example dates from 1462. The coat of arms was officially granted on June 24, 1911, and confirmed on February 6, 1976, after the local government reorganization of 1975.

The bottom part of the coat of arms of the former Amt Balve is identical Bolve's town arms. The top half showed St. Peter, wearing a red coat and holding in his left hand a golden key and in his right a golden book. This coat of arms was granted on March 5, 1957, and expired when the Amt was dissolved in 1975.

== Persons of interest ==
- Jean-Marc Gaulin (1962–), Canadian ice hockey player born in Balve
- Franz Hoffmeister (1898–1943), Roman Catholic priest
- Theodor Pröpper (1896–1979), composer and church musician
- Hermann Wedekind (1910–1998), actor, opera singer and theatre director
