= Franz Hoffmeister =

German priest

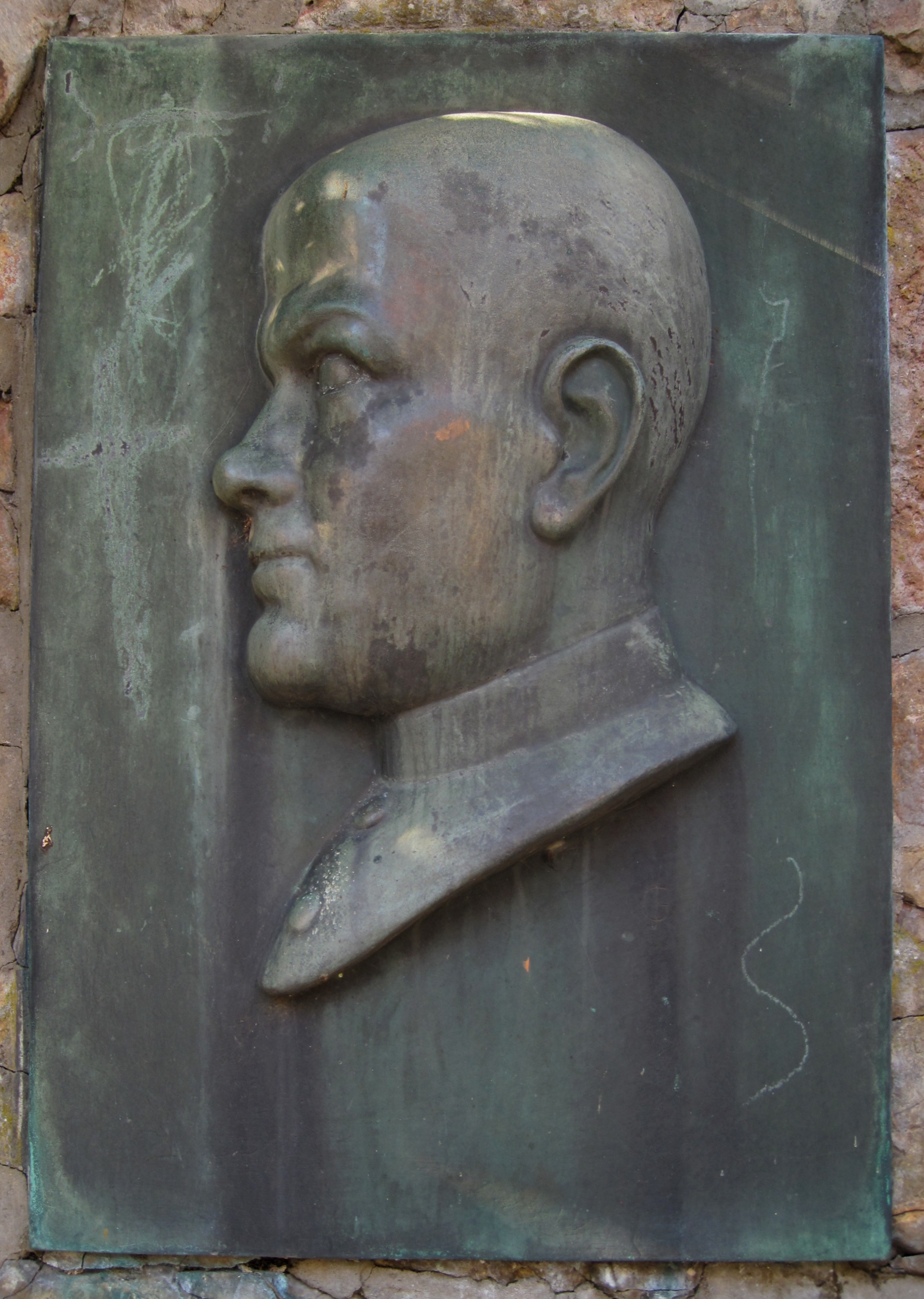
Franz Hoffmeister

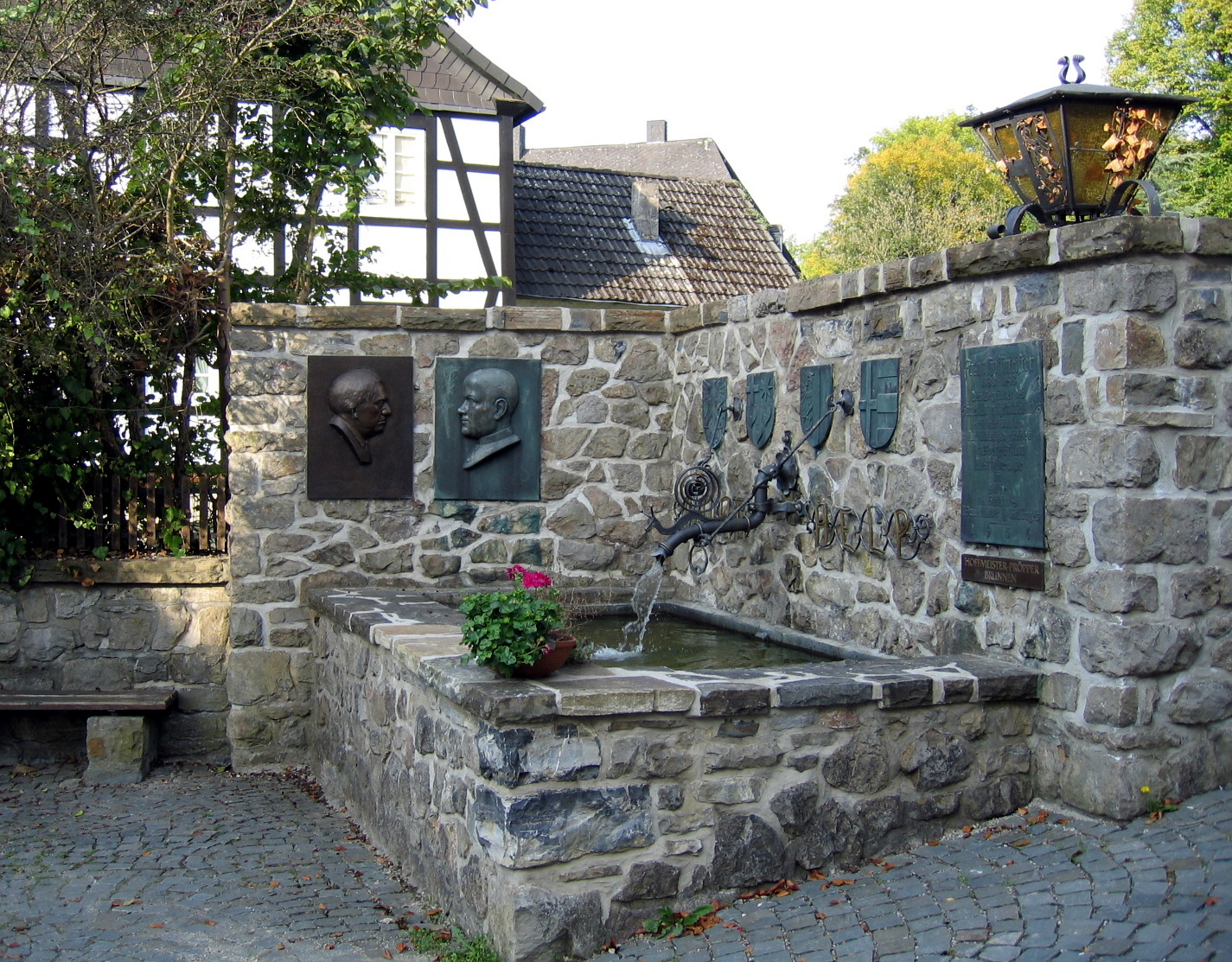
A fountain in memory of Franz Hoffmeister and Theodor Pröpper at Balve

Franz Hoffmeister (22 March 1898 – 27 March 1943) was a German Roman Catholic priest and the founder of the Sauerländer Heimatbund and Festspiele Balver Höhle.

== Life ==
Hoffmeister was born in Ramsbeck. He was consecrated to a Roman Catholic priest by bishop Hähling von Lanzenauer in 1924.
