= Martti Rousi =

Martti Arvo Henrik Rousi (born 2 November 1960 in Piikkiö), is a Finnish cellist.

Martti Rousi started to play the cello at the age of 8 in Turku. His first teachers were Timo Hanhinen and Seppo Kimanen. He then studied at the Sibelius Academy with Arto Noras and received his diploma in 1983. In 1985–86, he studied with Janos Starker at Indiana University. He also took part in Master Classes with Natalia Gutman, Walter Deshpalj, and William Pleeth.

In 1982, Rousi won the Turku National Competition for Finnish cellists. In 1986, he won second prize at the Tchaikovsky International Competition in Moscow.

From 1989 to 1992, Rousi was artistic director of the Lemi Music Festival. Since 1992 he has been artistic director of the Turku Music Festival. Since 1995 he is professor of cello at the Sibelius Academy in Helsinki.
