= Philharmonie der Nationen =

German symphony orchestra

The Philharmonie der Nationen is a symphony orchestra with administrative headquarters in Hamburg, founded by conductor Justus Frantz. Its motto is Frieden und Völkerverständigung (Peace and international understanding) and it is mainly composed of musicians from Eastern Europe. According to its own statement, the orchestra finances itself through donations and grants from the Friends Association, without drawing on public funds.

== History ==
The Philharmonie der Nationen was founded in 1995 by Justus Frantz as a professional, international orchestra. Since then, the orchestra has given numerous performances and made recordings. It is considered world renowned and Justus Frantz's musical life's work.

In connection with the bankruptcy of the Philharmonie der Nationen Konzertmanagement GmbH, there were investigations against Frantz in 2001, who denied any accusations in this connection. As a result of the founding of the Philharmonie and various sponsoring companies, Frantz apparently got into economic difficulties. A dispute arose with the sponsoring association. In May 2010, Frantz declared that the quarrels with the Förderverein were over and that all debts had been settled.

Today, the supporting organisation is the Philharmonie der Nationen GmbH. From 2012 until his move to the Südwestdeutsche Philharmonie Konstanz in 2013, Beat Fehlmann was managing director. In August 2013, Robert Hille – previously managing director of the Hamburger Camerata – took over the office. Since 2014, Christian Lorenz has been handling the management with a cultural agency.

In October 2018, the Philharmonia of Nations had to file for insolvency; shortly before, Frantz had withdrawn from the management of the company.

Reinhold Würth, the orchestra's long-standing sponsor, agreed to take over outstanding fee claims amounting to one million euros. Nevertheless, there was subsequently a rift between Würth and Frantz, as a result of which Würth ended the cooperation and devoted more time to building up the Würth Philharmonic Orchestra, which is partly recruited from former members of the Philharmonia of Nations.

== Concert activity ==
- 1996: Accompaniment of the state visit of the German Federal President to China
- 1998: Official orchestra of the Operalia, a singing competition of Plácido Domingo
- 1998: Performance for the "United Nations Day" in the General Assembly Hall of the UN in New York
- 2000: Performance in the dome of the Berlin Reichstag building as a sign against right-wing radicalism in Germany
- 2001: Private concert with Pope Pope John Paul II at Castel Gandolfo
- 2001: Solidarity concert in aid of the victims of 11 September in the St. Michael's Church, Hamburg
- 2002: Concert tour through the eastern Mediterranean, including performance in the Concertgebouw, Amsterdam
- 2003: Ceremony at the Konzerthaus Berlin on the occasion of the inclusion of the original manuscripts of Ludwig van Beethoven's 9th Symphony in the UNESCO Memory of the World Programme list, together with the Kaunas State Choir
- 2006: Opening concert in Sibiu on the occasion of the city's status as European Capital of Culture 2007
- 2012–2015: Various concerts in Germany, including at the Schleswig-Holstein Musik Festival and the Rheingau Musik Festival

== Musicians ==
The musicians of the Philharmonia of Nations come from forty nations and five continents.

Musicians up to the age of 35 can apply via CV and submissions of samples of their work on CD or video and will be selected according to the quality of their submissions. Beyond that, there are no audition dates.

== Sponsoring association ==
A sponsoring association supports the work of the orchestra, among other things, through sponsorship programmes for individual musicians. In addition to orchestra director Frantz as chairman, the board consists of Norman Bach (2nd chairman) and Otto Bernhardt (treasurer) as well as a number of assessors. Another body is the Board of Trustees, which includes Stephan Paxmann as Secretary General, Otto Schily as President, as well as former Federal Chancellor Helmut Schmidt, and Friede Springer as Honorary Chairperson.

In 2000, according to press reports, the association had 5,000 members. Conflicts with the board led to a criminal complaint filed by Justus Frantz against two board members of the Friends in 2009. The accusations were embezzlement of donations as well as slander and defamation. In return, the board formulated serious accusations against Frantz. As a result, the old board was replaced in March 2010 and Justus Frantz was elected to the board of the Förderverein as its chairman.

The main sponsor of the orchestra in 2013 is the Würth Group; other sponsors are Schott AG, the Swiss company Montblanc and a mail-order champagne company.

== Prizes and awards ==
- 1994 Brahms-Preis of the Heide-based Brahms Society Schleswig-Holstein
- 2005 Würth Prize of Jeunesses Musicales Germany
