= Katharina von Georgien =

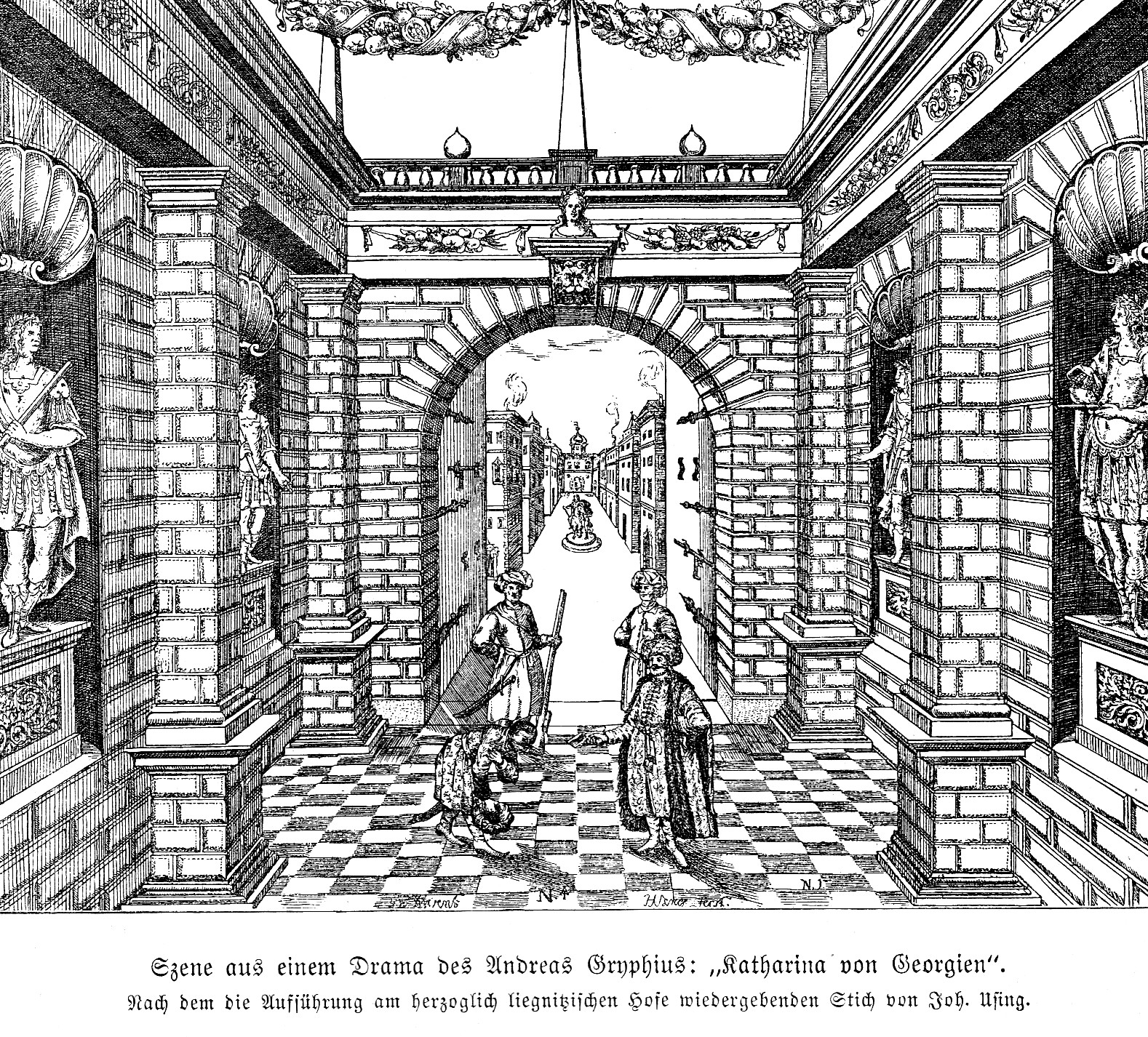

Katharina von Georgien is a drama written by baroque writer Andreas Gryphius about Queen Ketevan the Martyr of Georgia. It was published in 1657.

== Synopsis ==
The queen Ketewan dies for her faith. She was loved by Shah Abbas.

== Main characters ==
- Ketevan, queen of Georgia
- Shah Abbas, shah of Persia
- Iman Culi
- Seinel Can
- Salome
