= Justus Frantz =

German pianist, conductor, and television personality

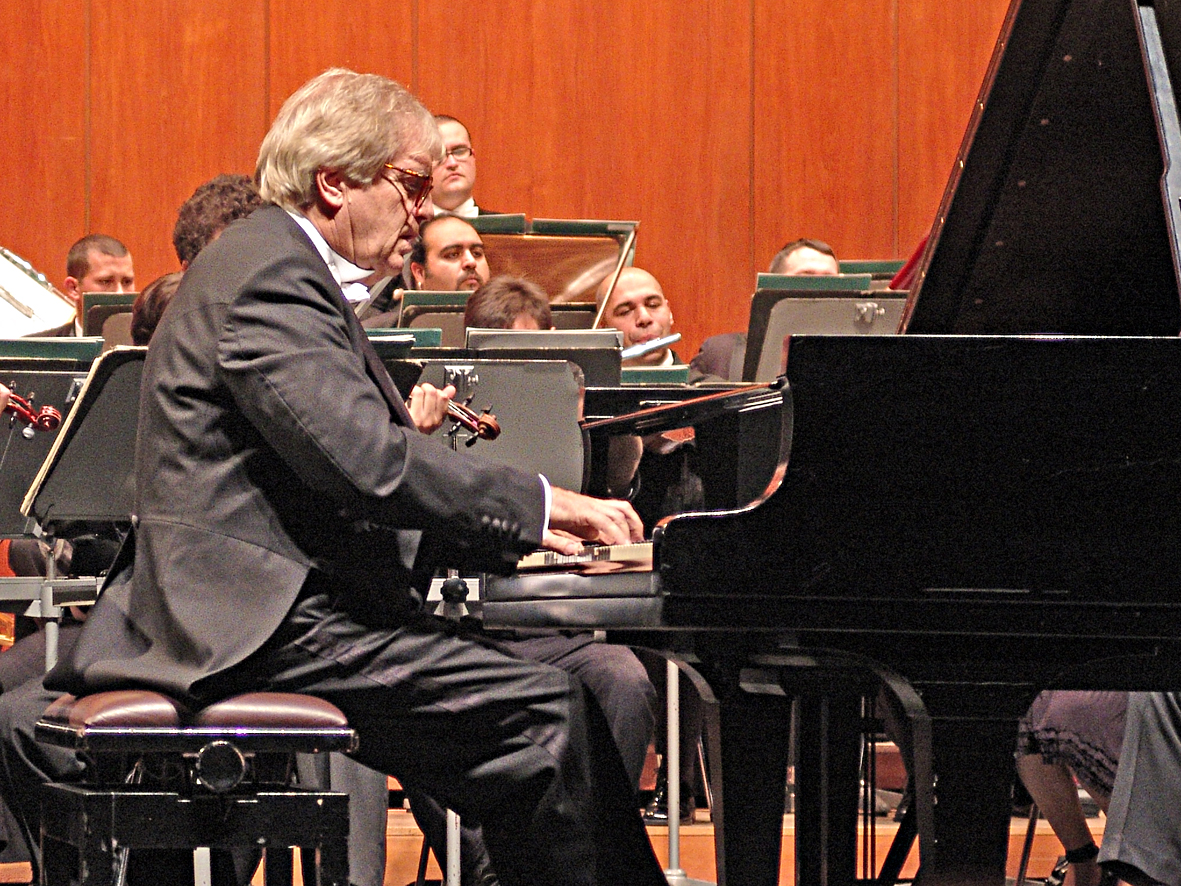
Frantz in 2006

Justus Frantz (born 18 May 1944 in Inowrocław, Poland, then Hohensalza, Germany) is a German pianist, conductor, and television personality.

== Life ==
Frantz began playing piano at the age of ten and later studied with Eliza Hansen and Wilhelm Kempff at the Hochschule für Musik und Theater Hamburg under a scholarship from the Studienstiftung des deutschen Volkes. In 1967, Frantz and Claus Kanngießer won the second prize at the international music competition of the ARD as a cello and piano duo, marking the beginning of his international career.

Frantz played with the Berlin Philharmonic Orchestra, conducted by Herbert von Karajan, in 1970. In 1975 he played in the United States for the first time with the New York Philharmonic Orchestra conducted by Leonard Bernstein, who became his lifelong friend. Other conductors with whom he has played include Carlo Maria Giulini and Rudolf Kempe. He founded the Schleswig-Holstein Musik Festival in 1986 and became a UNHCR Goodwill Ambassador in 1989, a post from which he has since retired. He also founded the Philharmonie der Nationen in 1995. In September 2013 he was appointed musical director of the Israel Sinfonietta Beer Sheva in Beersheba, Israel.

In May 2024 Frantz came out as bisexual, and said he had had several long same-sex partnerships over the years.

== Repertoire ==
Frantz mostly plays music from the Classical and Romantic periods, particularly by Mozart. He has played many pieces for piano duet or four hands with Christoph Eschenbach.

== Controversies ==
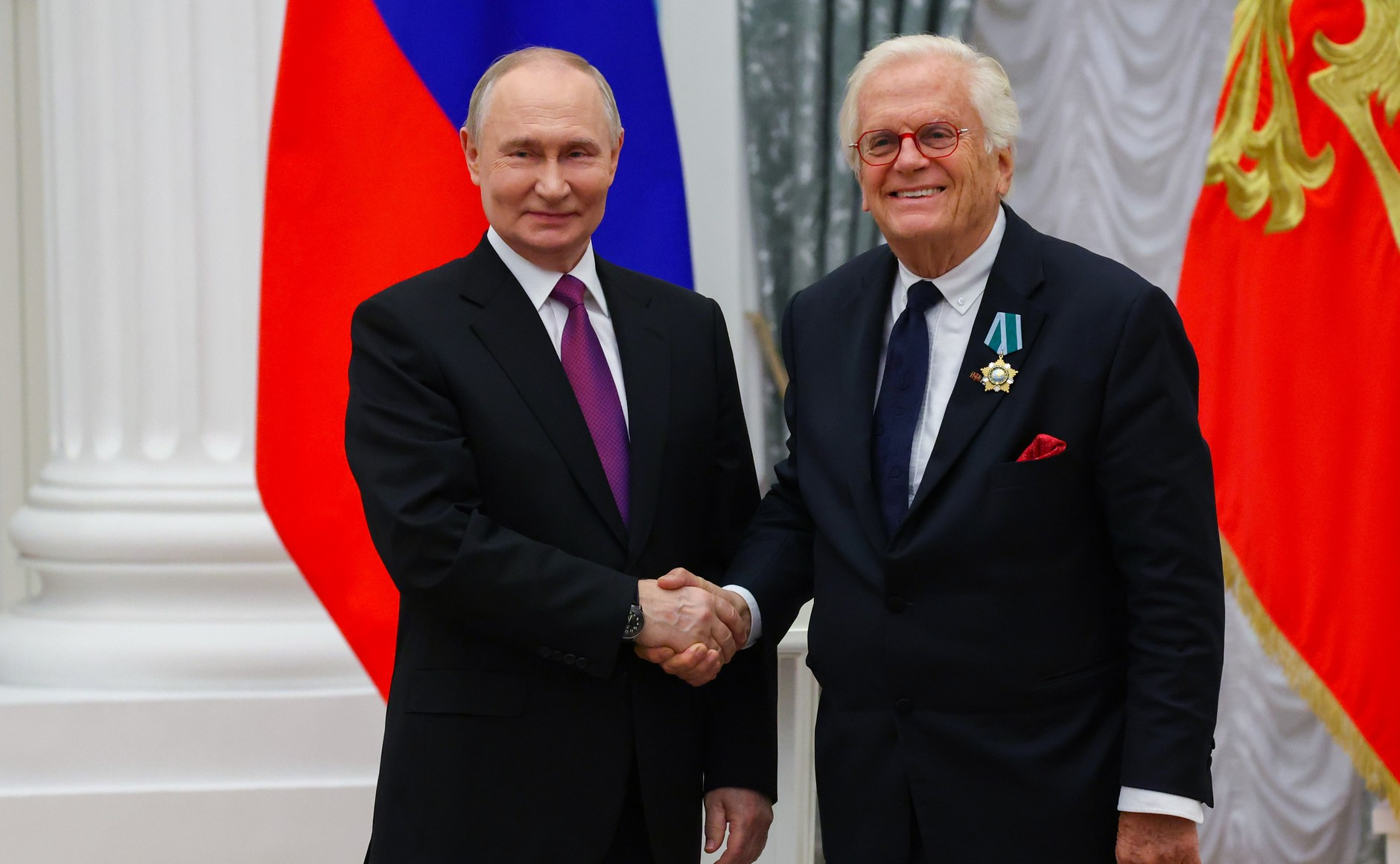
Frantz being awarded the Order of Friendship from Russian president Vladimir Putin, 4 November 2025

Frantz came under criticism after justifying the Russian annexation of Crimea in 2014, calling it "making amends for historical wrongdoing" and labeling himself a Putinversteher (literally: "Putin understander"). He repeatedly criticized the sanctions imposed on Russia, referring to Russian President Vladimir Putin as a "cultivated man". In February 2023, Frantz was one of the initial signers of the Manifest für Frieden, calling for an end to German military support to Ukraine in the wake of the 2022 Russian invasion. Later that year, Frantz also participated as a judge in the 2023 International Tchaikovsky Competition, despite a broader boycott by other musicians and judges amidst the invasion.

In 2024, Frantz celebrated his 80th birthday in St. Petersburg, where he performed alongside Valery Gergiev. In November 2025, Frantz was awarded the Russian Order of Friendship. He traveled to Moscow for the award ceremony and received the order from Putin.

== Performances (selection) ==
- Festspiele Balver Höhle (1994–2007)
