= Plackwald =

Ridge of hills in Germany

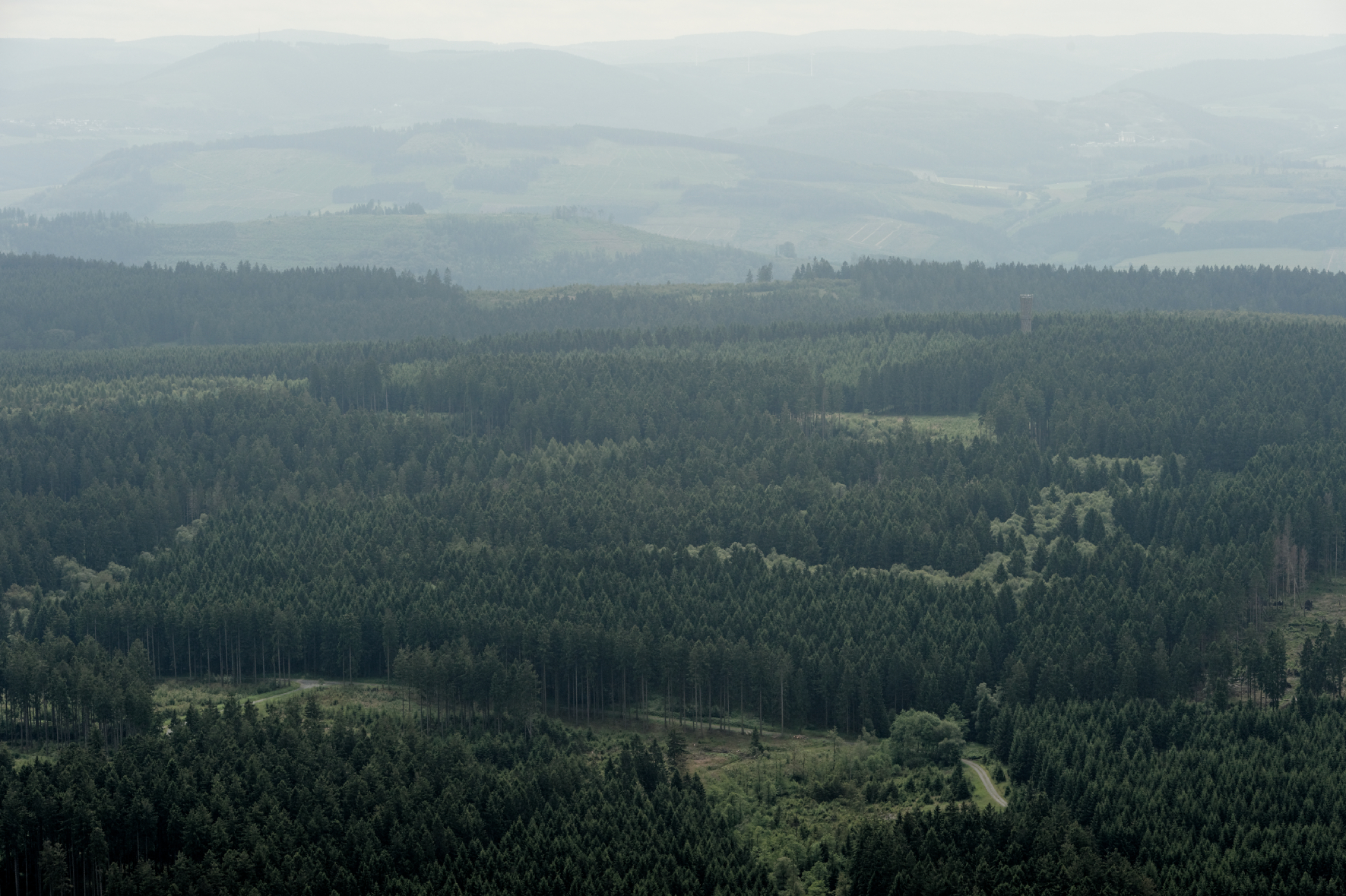
- View of the Plackwald and the Lörmecke Tower (centre right)

Highest point
- Peak: Plackweghöhe
- Elevation: 581.5 m (1,908 ft)
- Coordinates: 51°23′44″N 8°20′46″E

Geography
- Location within North Rhine-Westphalia
- Location: Counties of Soest and Hochsauerlandkreis, North Rhine-Westphalia
- Country: Germany
- Parent range: Rhenish Massif

The Plackwald is a ridge of hills, up to 581.5 m above sea level (NHN), and part of the Rhenish Massif in the counties of Soest and Hochsauerlandkreis, North Rhine-Westphalia, Germany. Within the North Sauerland Highlands (Unit number 334) it forms the natural region sub-unit of Plackweghöhe (Plackwald) (334.5).

== Geography ==
=== Location ===
The Plackwald lies in the Arnsberg Forest Nature Park between Meschede in the south and Warstein in the north. It runs from the northeast of the town of Arnsberg in the west to the village of Esshoff in the borough of Brilon in the east. As part of the watershed between the River Ruhr in the south and its tributary, the Möhne, in the north it consists of a chain of hills with the Plackweghöhe (581.5 m) as its highest point, whose name is a synonym for the hill ridge either side of the Plackweg, a long-distance path. Its main transport axis is the B 55 federal highway that divides the region roughly in the centre at the pass of Stimmstamm (541.1 m). Amongst the more notable sites of the Plackwald are the Meschede Transmission Tower and the Lörmecke observation tower as well as the rivers of the Heve, Langer Bach, Lörmecke and Wideybach.

=== Natural regions ===
In Germany's natural region classification system, the Plackwald forms the sub-unit of Plackweghöhe (Plackwald) (334.5). with the major unit group of the Süder Uplands (No. 33) and major unit of the North Sauerland Uplands (334). To the north are the sub-units of the Upper Arnsberg Forest (334.3) and Warstein Hills (334.4), to the east the Upper Möhne and Alme Forest (334.6), to the southwest and west the Oeventrop Ruhr Valley (334.1) and to the south the major unit of the Sauerland Basins (335).

== Description ==
The Plackwald is a high, flat-topped ridge, roughly 500 to 550 m, that runs eastwards from the Großer Berg near the Arnsberg village of Oeventrop over the Warsteiner Kopf and Nuttlarhöhe to the Brilon Plateau. Geologically the hill ridge comprises folded rocks of the Upper Carboniferous. In the Nuttlar Bowl, quartzitic argillaceous and greywacke slates of the Arnsberg Beds of the Namurian stage form the subsoil. Frequently, the horizons of argillaceous slate have been obliterated.

To the north the Plackwald descends comparatively gently to 450 m the Breitenbruch Forest (334.32) and Warstein Hills. To the south it drops steeply and suddenly into the Ruhr valley, around 250 metres below. The upper edge of the scarp of the truncated upland follows the Plackweghöhe, which runs along the southern edge of the Upper Arnsberg Forest, to the Inner Sauerland Basins (335). As a result, the climate in the Plackwald is harsher and, with around 1,000 mm of precipitation annually, wetter that in other areas of the North Sauerland Uplands. The average temperature in May/July is roughly 12 to 13 °C. The podsolic soils are poor in bases, sandy-loamy and of medium depth. In the spring hollows there is a tendency for stagnant water and bogs to form.

== Hills ==
The hills, eminences, spurs and other prominent high spots of the Plackwald include the following, sorted by height in metres (m) above sea level (NHN) (unless otherwise stated):

- Plackweghöhe (581.5 m), north-northeast of Eversberg (on the Plackweg); with the Lörmecke Tower
- Unnamed top (557.4 m), south-southeast of the Meschede Transmission Tower
- Warsteiner Kopf (556.9 m), north-northeast of the Eversberg
- Gemeinheitskopf (551.9 m), north-northwest of Föckinghausen
- Unnamed top (550.6 m), northwest of the Meschede Transmission Tower (on the Plackweg)
- Niekopf (550.4 m), north of Eversberg; source region of the Wideybach
- Wiemert (544.2 m), north of Föckinghausen
- Ensterknick (543.2 m), hamlet and fields north of Meschede-Galiläa (on the Plackweg)
- Nuttlarer Höhe (542.2 m), north of Nuttlar
- Stimmstamm (541.1 m), Passhöhe an B 55, north of Meschede
- Liverhagen (522.6 m), north of Eversberg
- Moosberg (522.0 m), north of Meschede
- Hornscheid (519.7 m), north of Eversberg
- Brandenberg (509.3 m), north of the Meschede Transmission Tower
- Neuer Berg (504.2 m), southwest of Hirschberg
- Wennemer Höhe (503.3 m), north of Wennemen
- Kopf (500,8 m), northeast of Eversberg
- Blumenkopf (Südkopf, 500.7 m), southwest of Warstein, near the B 55
- Blumenkopf (Nordkopf, 498.9 m), southwest of Warstein, near the B 55
- Großer Berg (476.0 m), northeast of Freienohl
- Meidenberg (466.7 m), southeast of Hirschberg
