= Arnsberg Forest Nature Park =

Nature park in Germany

Coordinates: 51°23′44″N 8°20′46″E

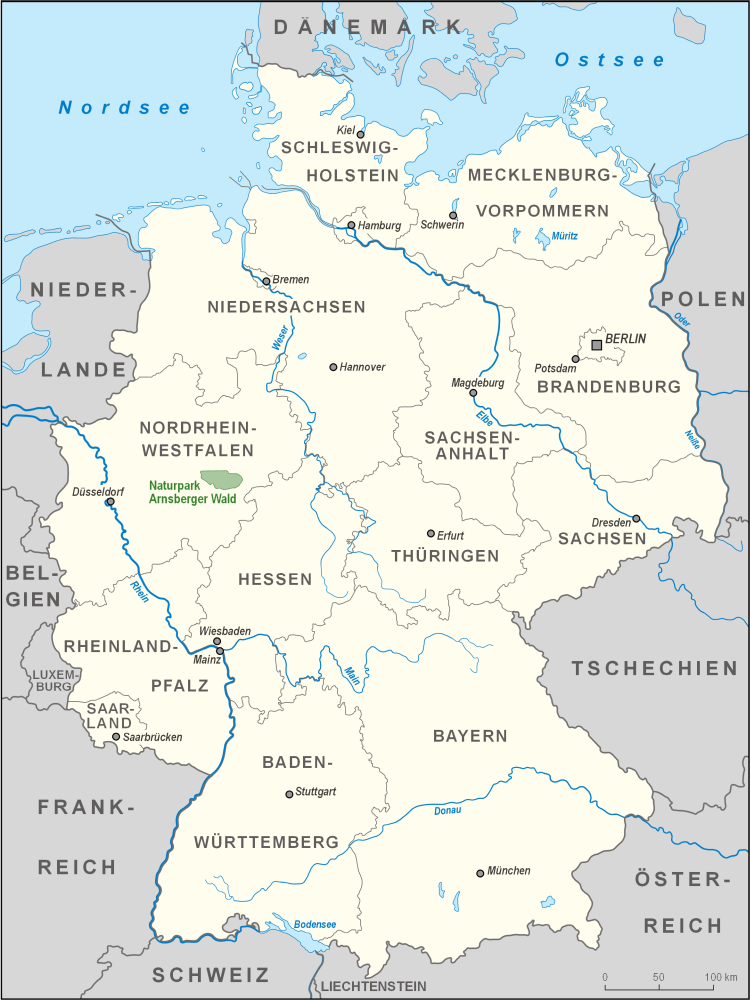
Location of the nature park within Germany

The Arnsberg Forest Nature Park (German: Naturpark Arnsberger Wald) is a nature park in the districts of Hochsauerlandkreis and Soest within the administrative region of Arnsberg in the German state of North Rhine-Westphalia. The park was established in 1960 and covers an area of 482 km^{2}. Nearly 350 km^{2} of the protection is forested and the park's wooded hills rise up to 581.5 m above sea level (NN).

The nature park, which consists of the Arnsberg Forest in the west and the Warstein Forest in the east, is important for the regional economy both in terms of forestry and tourism. The two forests form a densely wooded part of the Süder Uplands within the Rhine Massif.

== Geography ==
=== Location ===
The Arnsberg Forest Nature Park lies between the river Möhne in the north, on which the Möhne Reservoir is located, and the deep valley of the Ruhr in the south. Between these two valleys the park is situated between Möhnesee in the northwest, Rüthen in the northeast, Brilon in the east, Olsberg in the southeast, Meschede in the south and Arnsberg in the southwest; Warstein lies within the nature reserve. To the north is the heavily forested region of the Haarstrang, to the east are the Brilon Heights, to the south is the Rothaargebirge, to the southwest is the Lennegebirge and to the west the terrain gradually descends towards Dortmund into the Ruhr.

=== Rivers and lakes ===
The best-known water feature in the Arnsberg Forest Nature Park is the Möhnesee, set in the Möhne valley between the Haarstrang in the north and the Arnsberg Forest in the south. Numerous rivers run through the wooded valleys. These include the Ruhr and Möhne, which border the forests, as well as other water courses that feed the Möhne and Ruhr:

- Biber (Möhne tributary near Rüthen)
- Glenne (Möhne tributary northwest of Rüthen-Kallenhardt)
  - Lörmecke (Glenne tributary between Suttrop and Kallenhardt)
  - Möhne (Ruhr tributary near Neheim-Hüsten)
- Wester (Möhne tributary near Belecke)
  - Langer Bach (Wester tributary near Warstein)
  - Wideybach (Wester tributary near Warstein)
- Heve (Möhne tributary, mouth at the southern end of the Möhnesee)
- Ruhr (Rhine tributary near Duisburg-Ruhrort)
- Wanne (Ruhr tributary near Niedereimer)

=== Hills ===
The hills and hilltops of the Arnsberg Forest Nature Park include: the Warsteiner Kopf (556.9 m; fourth-highest hill), the Gemeinheitskopf (551.9 m; fifth-highest hill) the Niekopf (550.4 m; sixth-highest hill) and the Nuttlarer Höhe (542.2 m). These are the best known hills in the nature park because, unlike the other local heights they are shown on most of the maps and the specialised reference books. There are also, as the following list shows, a number of unnamed hilltops.

- Highest hill (unnamed Kuppe; 581.5 m above sea level (NN))
- Second highest hill (unnamed Kuppe; 559.5 m above NN)
- Third highest hill (unnamed Kuppe; 557.4 m above NN)
- Fourth highest hill (Warsteiner Kopf; 556.9 m above NN)
- Fifth highest hill (Gemeinheitskopf; 551.9 m above NN)
- Sixth highest hill (Niekopf; 550.4 m above NN)

== Villages ==
In or on the edge of the Arnsberg Forest Nature Park are numerous villages belonging to these municipalities and towns:

- Rüthen in the northeast
- Brilon in the east
- Olsberg in the southeast,
- Bestwig in the south-southeast
- Meschede in the south
- Arnsberg in the southwest
- Ense in the northwest
- Möhnesee in the north-northwest
- Warstein in the centre

== Tourism ==
=== Sights ===
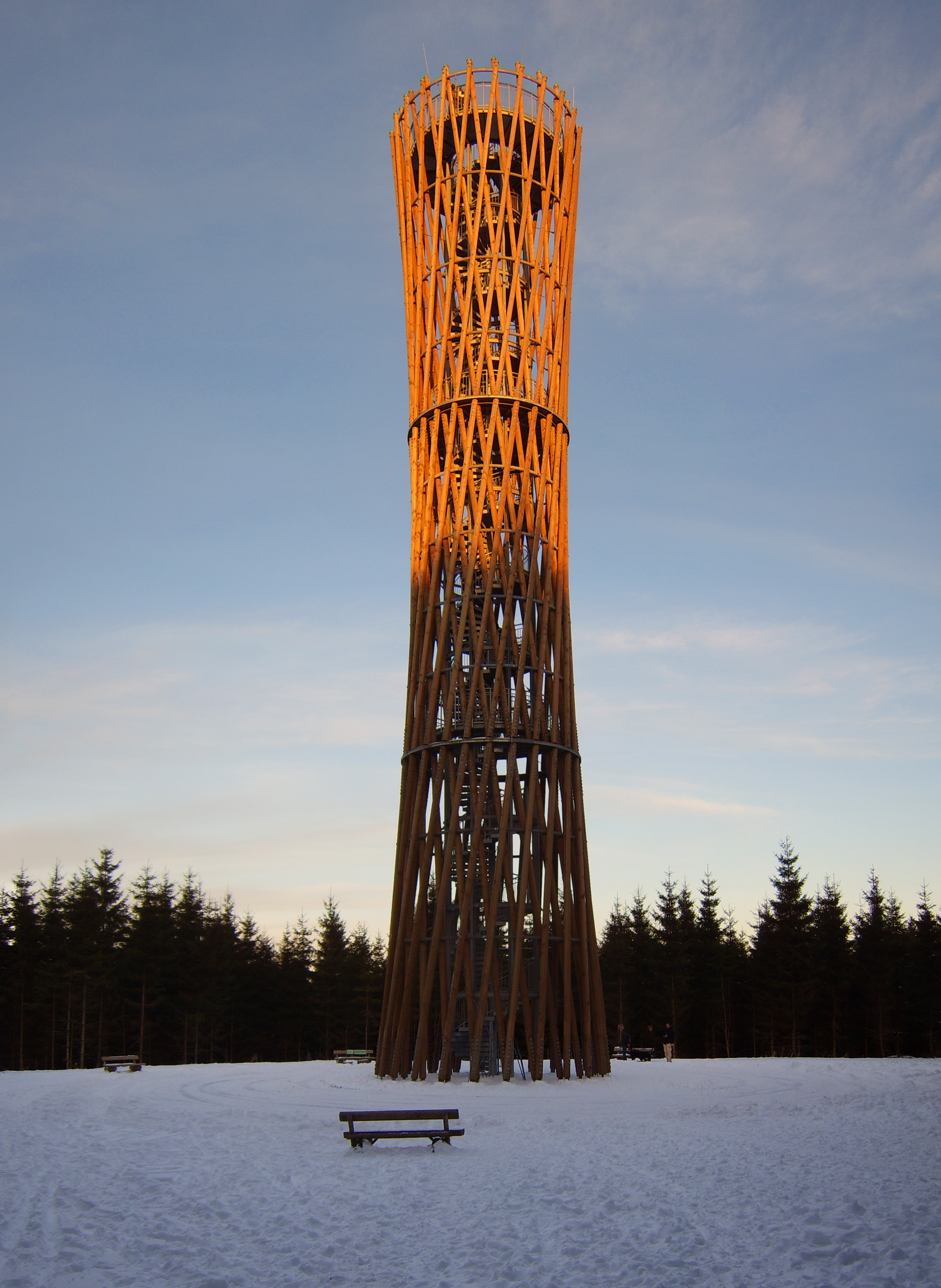
Lörmecke Tower

The Bilstein Cave southwest of Warstein in the Arnsberg Forest Nature Park attracts many tourists. The cave of Hohler Stein southwest of Rüthen-Kallenhardts is also worth visiting as are the observation towers of Lörmecke Tower (near the highest point in the Arnsberg Forest Nature Park between Warstein and Eversberg), the Küppel Tower (near Meschede-Freienohls) and the Delecke Bismarck Tower (north of Möhnesee-Delecke).

=== Trails ===
Many trails wind through the Arnsberg Forest Nature Park and its hills and valleys. The best known are the Upland Trail (no. "X 13") and the Renn Trail (no. "X 26").

== Literature ==
- Ralf Günther: The Arnsberger Wald im Mittelalter. Forstgeschichte als Verfassungsgeschichte. Veröffentlichungen der Historischen Kommission für Westfalen, Nr. 22. / Geschichtliche Arbeiten zur westfälischen Landesforschung, Band 20. Aschendorff, Münster 1994, 345 (IX) S., ISBN 3-402-06782-X

== See also ==
- List of nature parks in Germany
- Arnsberg Forest massacre
