= Plackweghöhe =

Highest point in the borough of Warstein, Germany

Plackweghöhe (main summit)
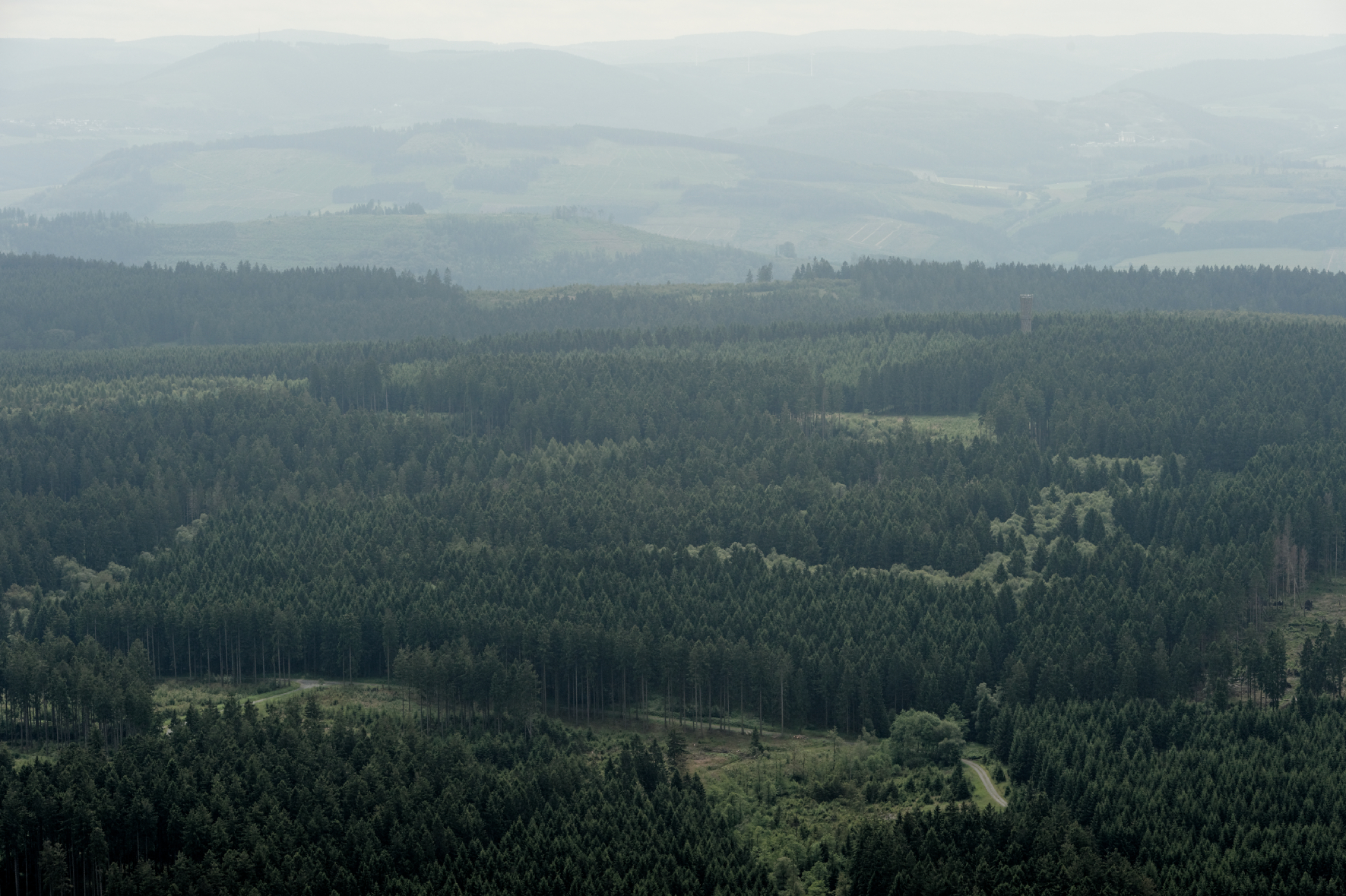
- Aerial view of the Plackwaldhöhe and Lörmecke Tower (centre right)

Highest point
- Elevation: 581.5 m above sea level (NHN) (1,908 ft)
- Prominence: 102 m ↓ south of Altenbüren
- Isolation: 7.1 km → Vogelsang (595 m, North scarp of the Rothaar Mountains)
- Coordinates: 51°23′44″N 8°20′46″E

Geography
- Location within North Rhine-Westphalia
- Location: Warstein (Soest), Meschede (Hochsauerlandkreis) – both in North Rhine-Westphalia, Germany
- Parent range: Plackwald, North Sauerland Uplands

The Plackweghöhe ("Plackweg Heights"), whose main summit has hitherto had no official name, is the highest point in the borough of Warstein, the hill ridge of the Plackwald, the North Sauerland Uplands, and the Arnsberg Forest Nature Park in the German state of North Rhine-Westphalia. It is 581.5 m above sea level (NHN) and lies within the counties of Soest and Hochsauerlandkreis. The Lörmecke Tower observation tower at the top is a popular destination.

== Geography ==
=== Location ===
The Plackweghöhe lies in the northern Sauerland. In the area of its main summit it is around 5 km south of Warstein (in Soest) and about 3 km north-northeast of Meschede (in Hochsauerlandkreis). It is linked via the Plackweg forest track with the Stimmstamm Pass (541.1 m) over the Plackwald hills about 2.85 km away to the west as the crow flies on the B 55 federal highway. The area is drained towards the south into the nearby River Ruhr and to the north to the Ruhr's tributary, the Möhne, several kilometres away.

The highest point is shown on commercial maps just as an unnamed trig point, even though it is the summit of a hill range in the Central Uplands and is more than 20 metres higher than other summits in the range.

=== Natural regions ===
The Plackweghöhe belongs to the major unit group of the Süder Uplands (Np. 33) and the major unit of the North Sauerland Uplands (334) as part of the Plackweghöhe (Plackwald) sub-unit (334.5).

== Name ==
The name Plackweghöhe does not just cover the hill itself, but a ridge along the old trading route of the Plackweg. It is mentioned in 1969 on the Arnsberg Sheet, after the same author, in 1963, had not used it in the Arolsen Sheet. The term does not relate explicitly to the highest point, but to the entire, roughly 20-km-long ridgeline of the North Sauerland scarp on the Ruhr-Möhne watershed between the hills of Großer Berg (476.0 m) in the west and the Großen Storchschnabel (ca. 516.7 m) in the east, along which ridgeline the Plackweg runs. The ridge is asymmetrically oriented towards the south and drops steeply into the Ruhr.
