= Bilsteinbach =

River in Germany

Location
- Country: Germany
- State: North Rhine-Westphalia

Physical characteristics
- Mouth
  - location: Schorenbach
  - coordinates: 51.4510°N 8.3247°E

Basin features
- Progression: Schorenbach→ Wester→ Möhne→ Ruhr→ Rhine→ North Sea

Bilsteinbach, in its lower course named Hirschberger Bach, is a river of North Rhine-Westphalia, Germany. It is 9 km long. It flows through the Bilstein Cave and discharges into the Schorenbach near Warstein.

== See also ==
- List of rivers of North Rhine-Westphalia
