= Rißneibach =

River in Germany

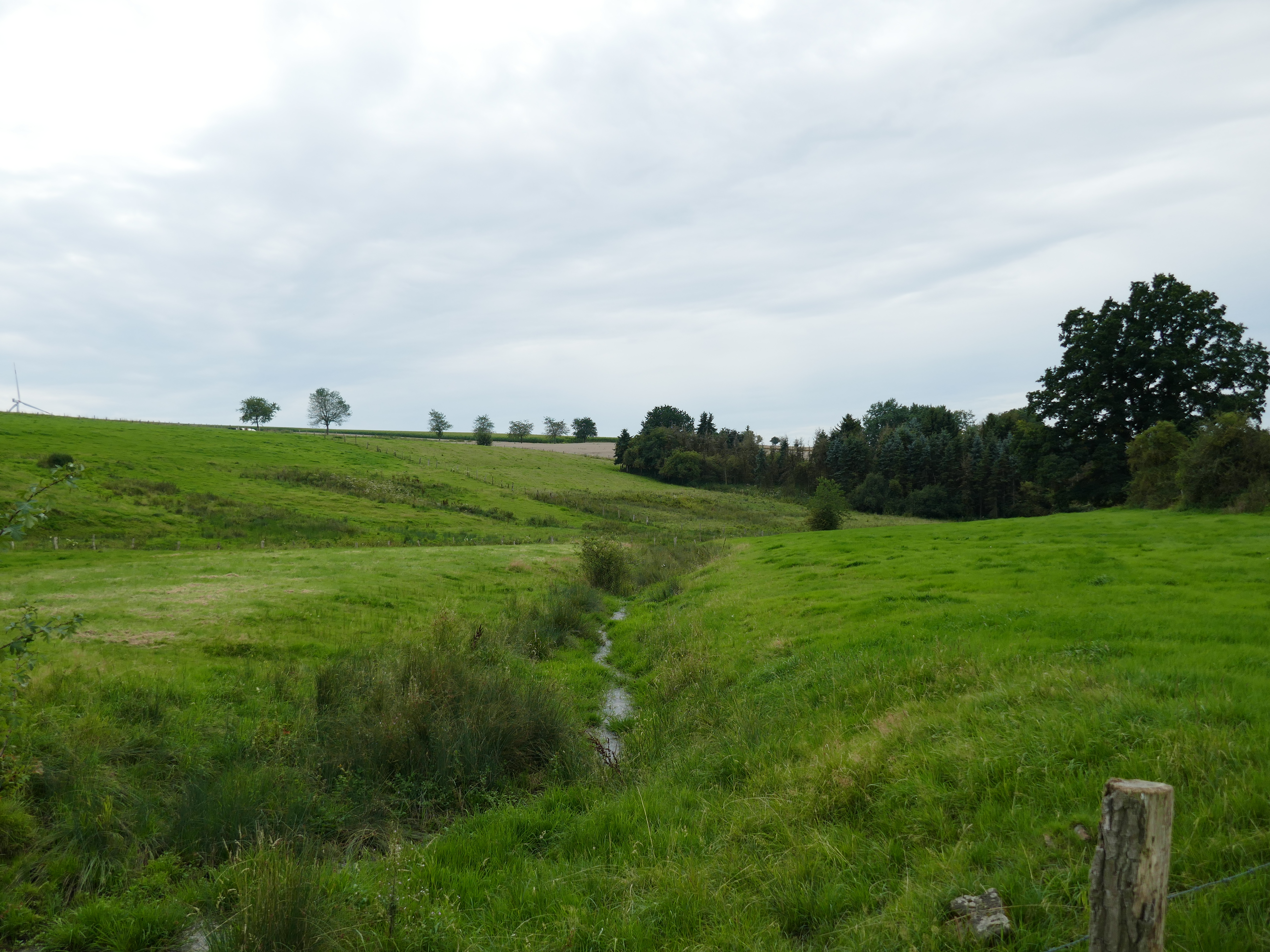

Location
- Country: Germany
- States: North Rhine-Westphalia

Physical characteristics
- Mouth
  - location: Möhne
  - coordinates: 51.4852°N 8.4486°E

Basin features
- Progression: Möhne→ Ruhr→ Rhine→ North Sea

Rißneibach is a small river of North Rhine-Westphalia, Germany. It is 3.5 km (2.2 mi) long and flows as a right tributary into the Möhne in Rüthen.

== See also ==
- List of rivers of North Rhine-Westphalia
