= Pottsiepen =

River in Germany

Location
- Country: Germany
- States: North Rhine-Westphalia

Physical characteristics
- Mouth
  - location: Möhne
  - coordinates: 51.4772°N 8.4906°E

Basin features
- Progression: Möhne→ Ruhr→ Rhine→ North Sea

Pottsiepen is a small river of North Rhine-Westphalia, Germany. It is 1.5 km (0.9 mi) long and flows as a left tributary into the Möhne near Rüthen.

== See also ==
- List of rivers of North Rhine-Westphalia
