= Arnsberg Forest massacre =

1945 massacre of forced labourers by Nazi Germany

- Part of World War II
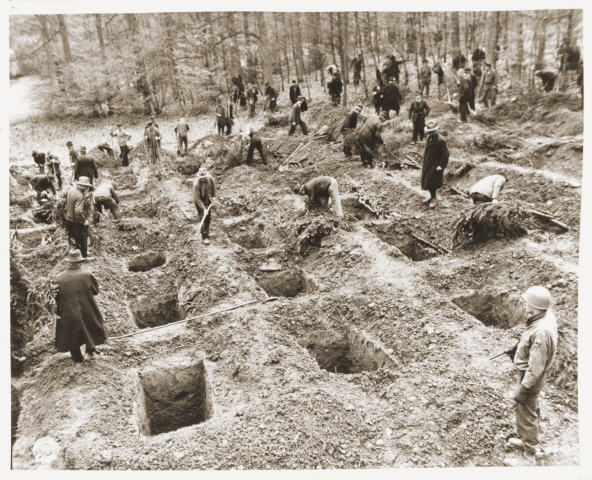
- German locals from Suttrop dig graves for the bodies of 57 Russians, including women and one baby, exhumed from a mass grave nearby.
- Location: 51°22′43.95″N 8°20′9.76″E; Arnsberg Forest, North Rhine-Westphalia, Germany
- Date: 20–23 March 1945
- Attack type: Extrajudicial killing
- Weapon: Firing squads
- Deaths: 208 people
- Victims: Russian and Polish forced labourers and Prisoners of War
- Perpetrator: Nazi Germany: Hans Kammler

The Arnsberg Forest massacre (also known as the Massacre in Arnsberg Woods) was a series of mass extrajudicial killings of 208 forced labourers and POWs (Ostarbeiter), mainly of Russian and Polish descent, by Nazi troops under the command of Hans Kammler from 20 to 23 March 1945.

As of 2021, only 14 of the 208 victims have been identified.

== First massacre ==
The first killing occurred on 20 March in the Langenbach Valley, near Warstein, when 71 prisoners were marched by Hans Kammler's forces into the Arnsberg Forest, where they were instructed to hand over all their clothes and belongings and leave them on the side of the road. As they were led to a streamside escarpment, they were executed en masse via firing squad. The majority of the civilians were women; adult men only made up 10 of the total number of prisoners.

=== Excavation ===
A study by archaeologists in 2019 found a number of different artifacts at the site where the victims were buried in a mass grave, including colourful buttons, shoes, and a Polish dictionary.

The archaeologists also found bullets scattered around the location, which suggested some of the prisoners tried to escape.

== Second massacre ==
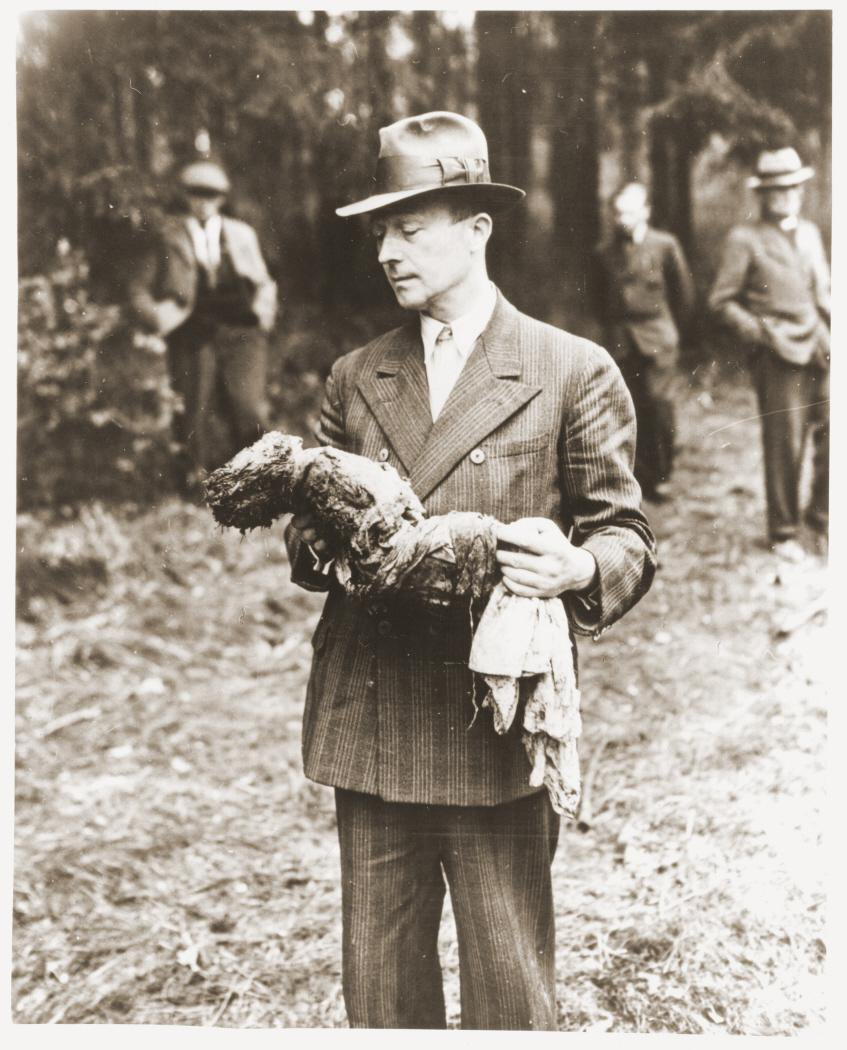
A German man holding the body of a murdered baby exhumed from the mass grave of 57 people killed by the Wehrmacht.

In the second massacre, the Waffen-SS and the Wehrmacht made another group of 57 prisoners dig a zig-zagged series of trenches. Right after finishing the project, they were gunned down by the Nazi soldiers and thrown into the trenches, meant to be a mass grave.

== Third massacre ==
On 23 March, the Wehrmacht blew a deep hole in the ground near Eversberg using grenades. Eighty labourers were lined up in front of the hole and shot in a manner so their bodies would fall into the pit. The burial site was covered with a cow paddock.

=== Excavation ===
In 2019, an archaeological study found 50 different artifacts at the site. While the Nazis had robbed most of their victims' possessions, they did leave behind materials they considered to be worthless, such as Soviet coins (indicating that many of the victims were Russian), a comb stand, and a harmonica.

== Aftermath ==
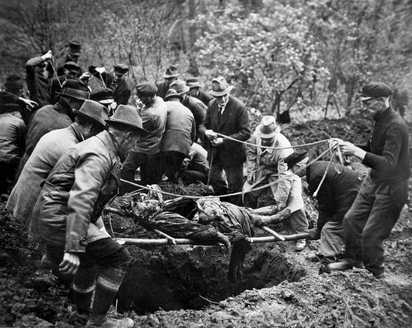
German civilians exhume the 51 bodies of the second massacre as American soldiers supervise them.

A few weeks after the massacres, the area around Arnsberg Forest was liberated by American troops, who discovered the first and second graves. The Americans heard about the killings from German informers. The soldiers, intending for the massacre to be revealed to the public, proceeded to organize the entire local German population (civilians and informers) to view the exhumation of the bodies.

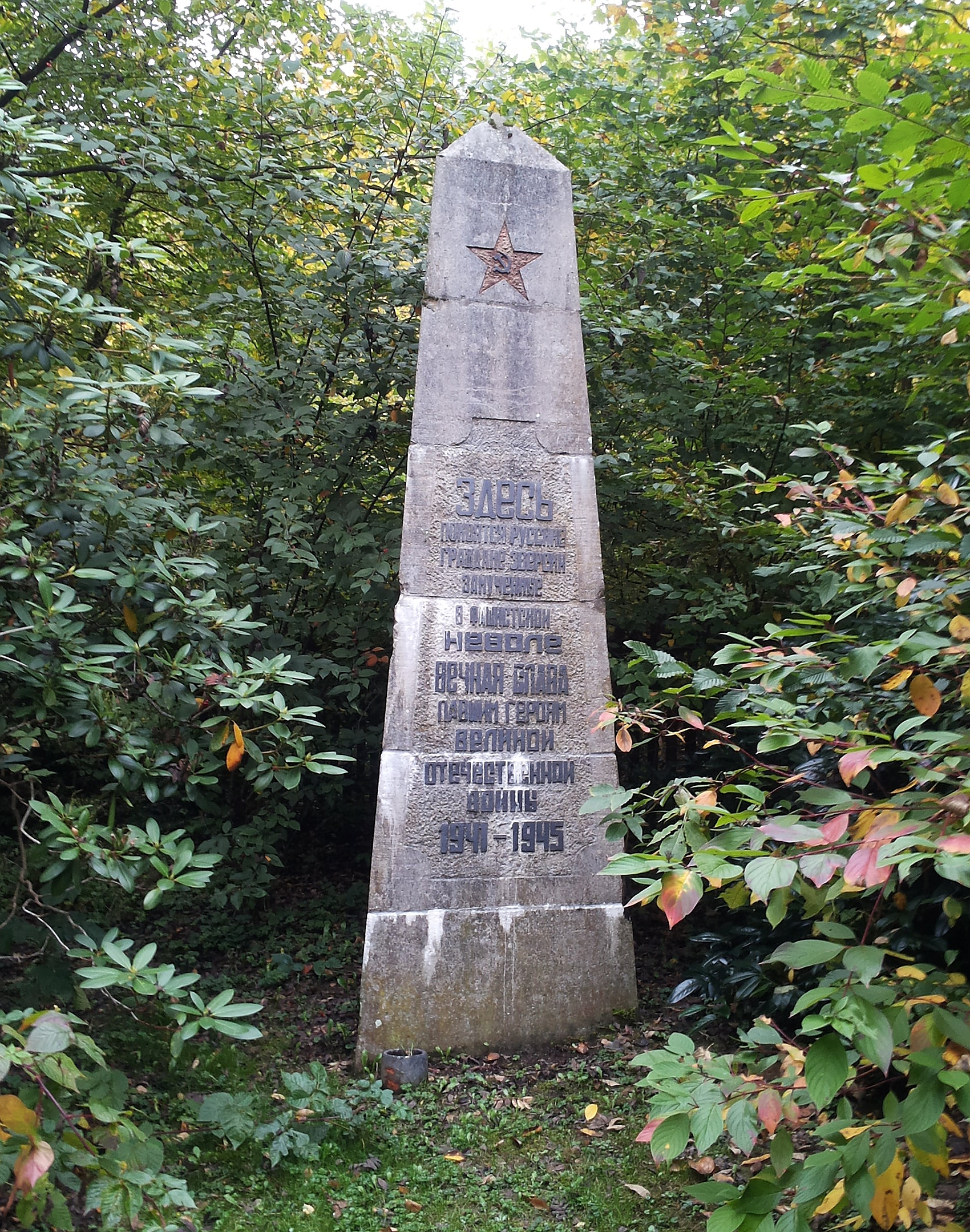
Stele in Fulmecke Cemetery to Soviets killed during the massacres

The third site was not found until 1946, when the British military located it after being told by an informant. The grave's bodies were exhumed the next year and placed in the Fulmecke Cemetery in Meschede, which was also where the remains of the other massacres' victims were reburied.

In 1957, six men were tried by a West German court for the massacre. They were Wolfgang Wetzling, Johann Miesel, Ernst Moritz Klönne, Bernhard Anhalt, Helmut Gaedt, and Heinz Zeuner. Wetzling was found guilty of manslaughter and sentenced to five years in prison, while Miesel and Klönne were only found guilty of aiding and abetting manslaughter. Miesel was released under the Impunity Act of 1954, while Klönne was sentenced to one year and six months in prison. The other three men, who were lower-ranking and had been following orders, were acquitted. The verdicts were greeted with shock, with Adolf Arndt describing as a "murder of the law." After a retrial, Wetzling was resentenced to life in prison for murder, while Miesel and Klönne were sentenced to three and four years in prison, respectively. Wetzling was released from prison on 1 March 1974. He died in 1989.

In 2019, a major scientific study analyzing all three sites occurred, resulting in the discovery of over 400 different artifacts by the archaeologists.

A 53 minute documentary on the event, entitled Nazi Killing Fields and directed by Max Neidlinger, was released in 2023.
