= Küttelbecke =

River in Germany

Location
- Country: Germany
- State: North Rhine-Westphalia

Physical characteristics
- Mouth
  - location: Möhne
  - coordinates: 51.4812°N 8.4176°E
- Length: 5.3 km (3.3 mi)

Basin features
- Progression: Möhne→ Ruhr→ Rhine→ North Sea

Küttelbecke is a small river of North Rhine-Westphalia, Germany. It flows into the Möhne near Rüthen.

== See also ==
- List of rivers of North Rhine-Westphalia
