= Bundesstraße 58 =

B 58
- Bundesstraße 58

Route information
- Length: 169 km (105 mi)

Major junctions
- West end: Netherlands border in Straelen, North Rhine-Westphalia
- East end: Bundesstraße 55 in Langenberg, North Rhine-Westphalia

Location
- Country: Germany
- States: North Rhine-Westphalia

Highway system
- Roads in Germany; Autobahns; List; Federal; List; State; E-roads

The Bundesstraße 58 (abbr. B58) is a german Federal Highway in northwestern North Rhine-Westphalia, starting at the Dutch border near Venlo, going approximately 169 km (105 mi) until merging into the Bundesstraße 55 in Langenberg.

== History ==
=== Napoleonic era ===
The western part of the B58 between Venlo and Wesel was originally built as a part of Napoleons Route imperiale 3, a road between Paris and Hamburg. The designation was later dropped under Prussian rule.

=== 20th century ===
In 1932 the Fernverkehrsstraßen lit. 'long-distance traffic roads' were introduced and parts of the modern B58 between the Dutch border and Haltern were named FVS 58. Later the renamed B58 was extended to Langenberg, where it meets the B55.

=== Bypasses ===
Multiple bypasses around towns were built in recent years, most significantly around Beckum, Ahlen and the B58n around Wesel, which as of 2026 is partially under construction.
