= Biber (Möhne) =

River of North Rhine-Westphalia, Germany

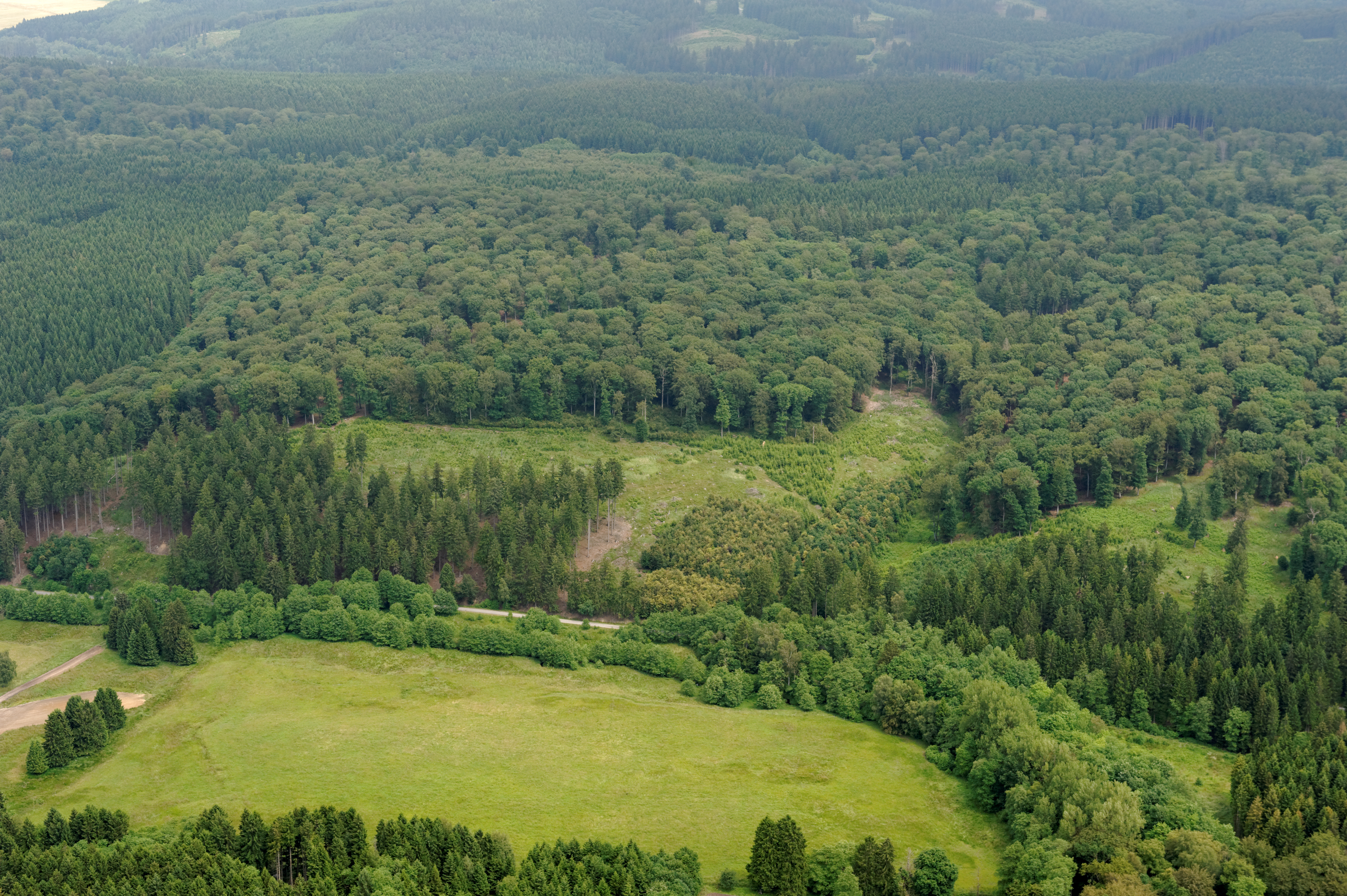

Location
- Country: Germany
- State: North Rhine-Westphalia

Physical characteristics
- Mouth
  - location: Möhne
  - coordinates: 51.4851°N 8.4481°E

Basin features
- Progression: Möhne→ Ruhr→ Rhine→ North Sea

Biber (German pronunciation: [ˈbiːbɐ]) is a river of North Rhine-Westphalia, Germany. It is 8.2 km long and a left tributary of the Möhne, which it joins in Rüthen.

== See also ==
- List of rivers of North Rhine-Westphalia
