= Bieke =

Bieke may refer to the following:

== Rivers of North Rhine-Westphalia, Germany ==
- Bieke (Bigge), tributary of the Bigge
- Bieke (Elpe), tributary of the Elpe
- Bieke (Glenne), right tributary of the Glenne that itself is a tributary of the Möhne
- Bieke (Kleine Henne), tributary of the Kleine Henne

== People ==
- Bieke Depoorter, Belgian photographer
