= Große Dumecke =

River in Germany

Location
- Country: Germany
- States: North Rhine-Westphalia

Physical characteristics
- Mouth
  - location: Möhne
  - coordinates: 51.4859°N 8.3527°E

Basin features
- Progression: Möhne→ Ruhr→ Rhine→ North Sea

Große Dumecke is a small river of North Rhine-Westphalia, Germany. It is 2.9 km long and flows into the Möhne near Warstein.

== See also ==
- List of rivers of North Rhine-Westphalia
