= Kielhackensiepen =

River in Germany

Location
- Country: Germany
- States: North Rhine-Westphalia

Physical characteristics
- Mouth
  - location: Möhne
  - coordinates: 51.4503°N 8.5393°E

Basin features
- Progression: Möhne→ Ruhr→ Rhine→ North Sea

Kielhackensiepen is a small river of North Rhine-Westphalia, Germany. It is a right tributary of the Möhne. The stream rises about 3 kilometers north of Scharfenberg at an altitude of 450 meters above sea level. From here it initially flows in a southwesterly direction. In the further course, the direction of the river changes to predominantly westerly directions. The Kielhackensiepen flows into the federal highway 516 at an altitude of 350 meters above sea level. The roughly 33.7 hectare catchment area is drained to the North Sea via the Möhne, Ruhr and Rhine.

== See also ==
- List of rivers of North Rhine-Westphalia
