= Aa (Möhne) =

River in Germany

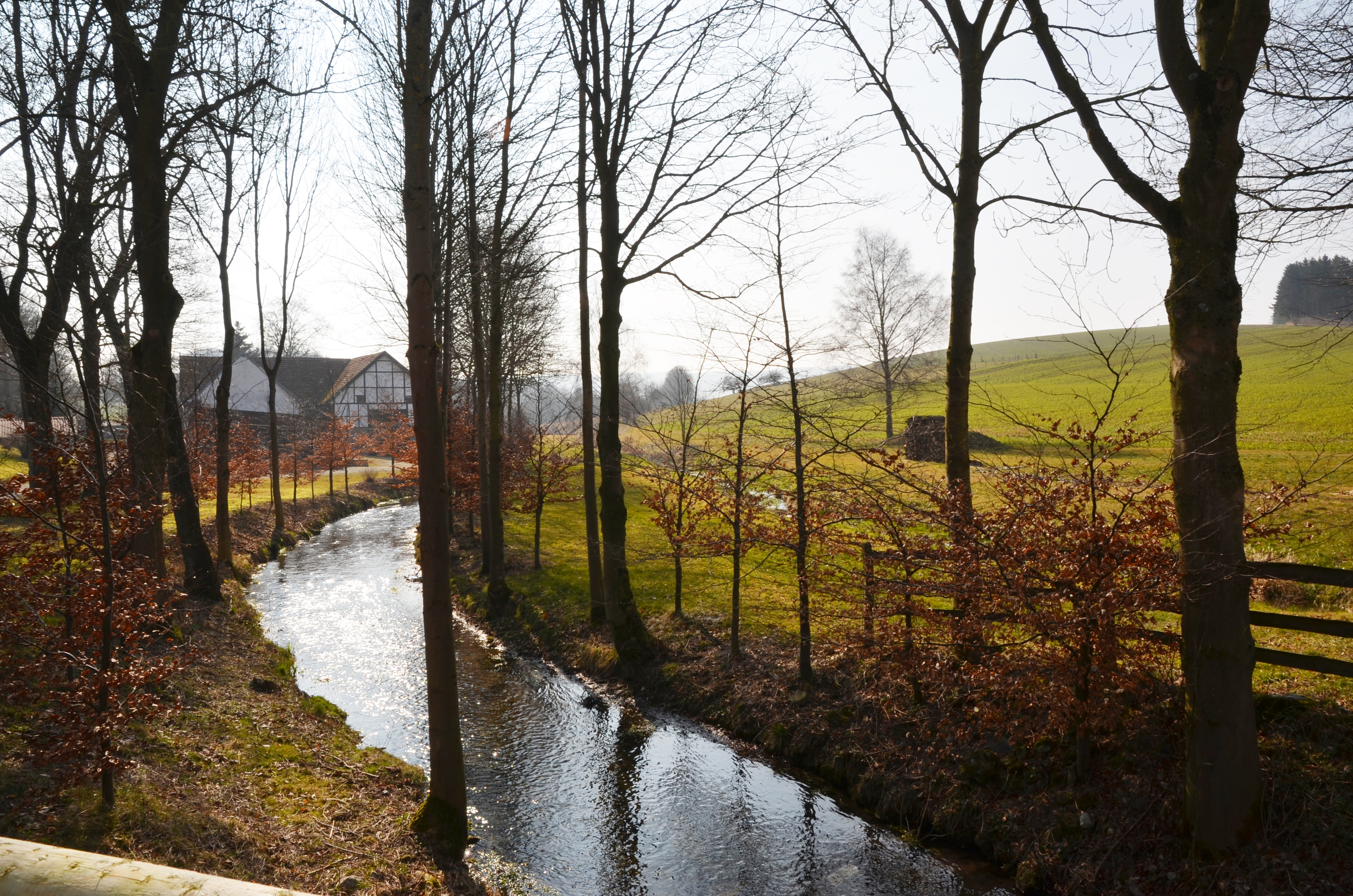

- North Rhine-Westphalia

Location
- Country: Germany
- State: North Rhine-Westphalia

Physical characteristics
- Source
  - elevation: 459 m (1,506 ft)
- Mouth
  - location: Möhne
  - coordinates: 51.4186°N 8.5831°E
  - elevation: 387 m (1,270 ft)

Basin features
- Progression: Möhne→ Ruhr→ Rhine→ North Sea

Aa is a river of North Rhine-Westphalia, Germany. It is 7.4 kilometres (4.6 mi) long and is a left tributary of the Möhne in Brilon. The river has a watershed of 23.071 square kilometres (8.908 mi^{2}).

The source of Aa is in the village of Altenbüren. From here it flows in an easterly direction. At 473 metres (1,552 ft) above sea level its course meanders to the north. Nearby the Hillbringse flows in from the south. Half a kilometer farther are five former mills in Aatal, called Aamühlen. The Fülsenbecke flows in near here from the north. The Aa overcomes an elevation difference of 72 metres (236 ft), which corresponds to an average bed slope of 9.7 percent.

The Aa is part of the larger Möhne river system, which flows through the Sauerland region and ultimately joins the Ruhr, and this valley is followed by the MöhnetalRadweg, a regional bike route that highlights the cultural and natural landscape shaped by these waterways.

== See also ==
- List of rivers of North Rhine-Westphalia
