= Fülsenbecke =

River in Germany

Location
- Country: Germany
- States: North Rhine-Westphalia

Physical characteristics
- Mouth
  - location: Aa
  - coordinates: 51.4078°N 8.5494°E

Basin features
- Progression: Aa→ Möhne→ Ruhr→ Rhine→ North Sea

Fülsenbecke is a small river of North Rhine-Westphalia, Germany. It flows into the Aa near Brilon.

== See also ==
- List of rivers of North Rhine-Westphalia
