= Enste =

Enste may refer to:

- A German name
- A noble dynasty from the Sauerland
- Enste, North Rhine-Westphalia
