= Hillbringse =

River in Germany

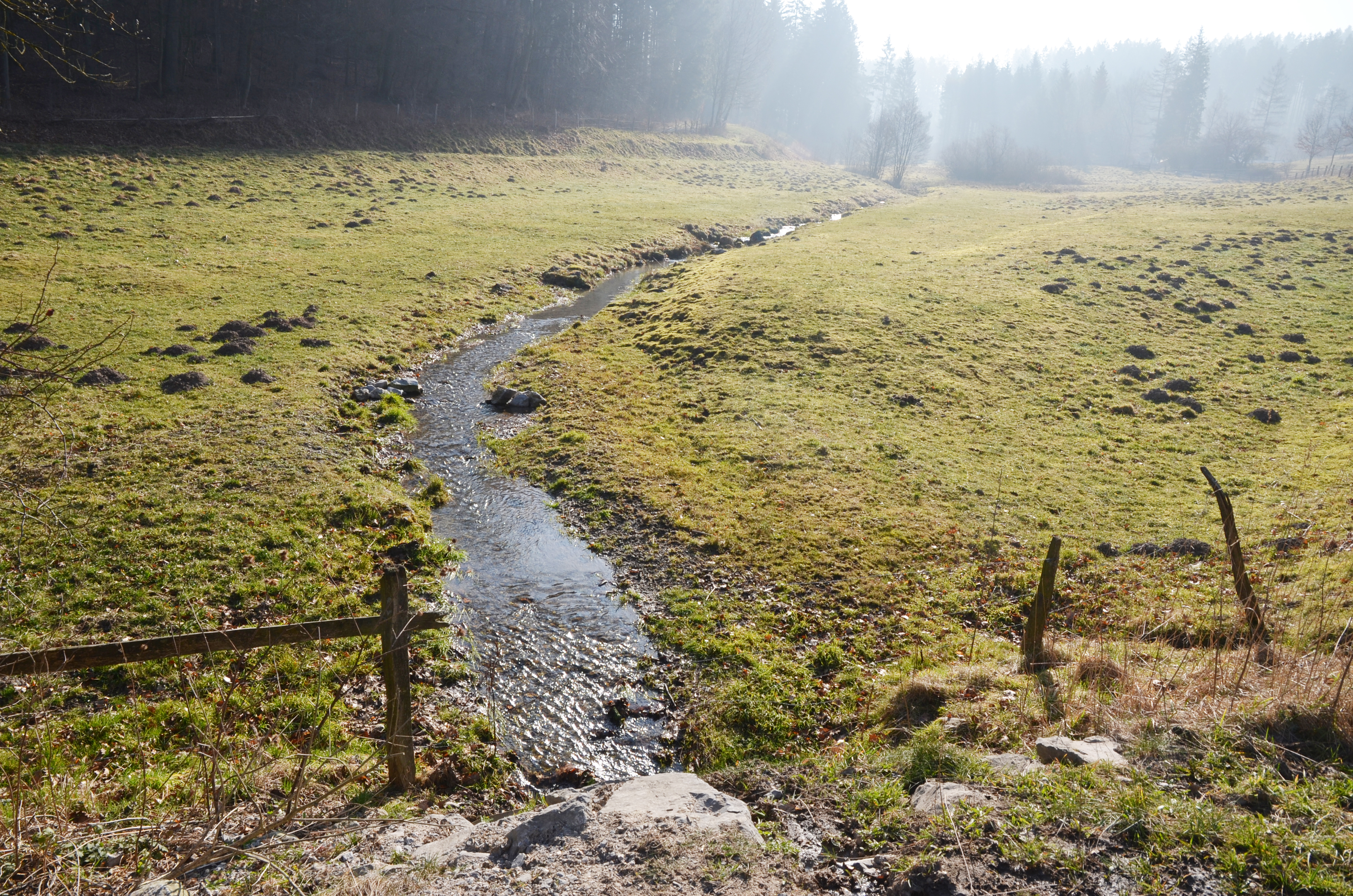

Location
- Country: Germany
- States: North Rhine-Westphalia

Physical characteristics
- Mouth
  - location: Aa
  - coordinates: 51.3919°N 8.5369°E

Basin features
- Progression: Aa→ Möhne→ Ruhr→ Rhine→ North Sea

The Hillbringse (also known as the Einsel, a name for part of river's course) is a small river of North Rhine-Westphalia, Germany. It is 4.6 km long and flows into the Aa near Brilon.

== Course ==
A section of the stream in the north has been straightened due to immediately adjacent agricultural use, but most of the stream has retained a natural course. The Einsel borders pasture land to the east. It flows through quarrying and grassland areas in the limestone hills southwest of Brilon.

== See also ==
- List of rivers of North Rhine-Westphalia
