= Bormelsbach =

River in Germany

Location
- Country: Germany
- State: North Rhine-Westphalia

Physical characteristics
- Mouth
  - location: Möhne
  - coordinates: 51.4879°N 8.3199°E

Basin features
- Progression: Möhne→ Ruhr→ Rhine→ North Sea

Bormelsbach is a small river of North Rhine-Westphalia, Germany. It is 1.6 km long and flows into the Möhne near Belecke.

== See also ==
- List of rivers of North Rhine-Westphalia
