= Bieke (Glenne) =

River in Germany

Location
- Country: Germany
- State: North Rhine-Westphalia

Physical characteristics
- Mouth
  - location: Glenne
  - coordinates: 51.4134°N 8.4925°E

Basin features
- Progression: Glenne→ Möhne→ Ruhr→ Rhine→ North Sea

Bieke (German pronunciation: [ˈbiːkə]) is a small river of North Rhine-Westphalia, Germany. It is a right tributary of the Glenne.

== See also ==
- List of rivers of North Rhine-Westphalia
