= Aupke =

River in Germany

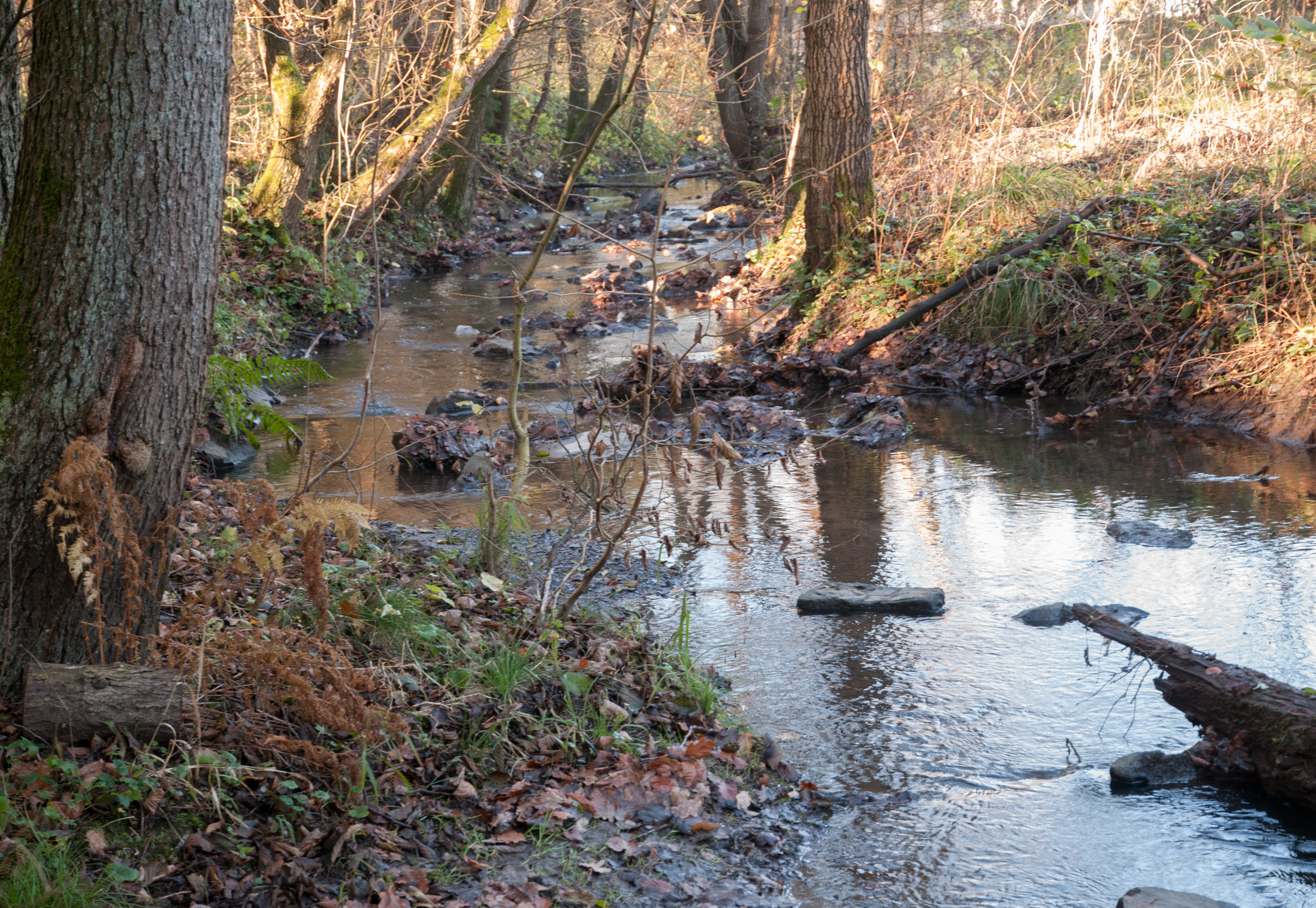

Location
- Country: Germany
- State: North Rhine-Westphalia

Physical characteristics
- Mouth
  - location: Möhne
  - coordinates: 51.4681°N 7.9895°E

Basin features
- Progression: Möhne→ Ruhr→ Rhine→ North Sea

Aupke is a river of North Rhine-Westphalia, Germany. It is 5.4 km long and flows into the Möhne near Neheim.

== See also ==
- List of rivers of North Rhine-Westphalia
