= Schorenbach =

River in Germany

Location
- Country: Germany
- State: North Rhine-Westphalia

Physical characteristics
- Mouth
  - location: Wester
  - coordinates: 51.4633°N 8.3422°E

Basin features
- Progression: Wester→ Möhne→ Ruhr→ Rhine→ North Sea

Schorenbach is a river of North Rhine-Westphalia, Germany. It is 5 km (3.1 mi) long and flows as a left tributary into the Wester near Warstein.

== See also ==
- List of rivers of North Rhine-Westphalia
