= Matthias Kerkhoff =

German politician (born 1979)

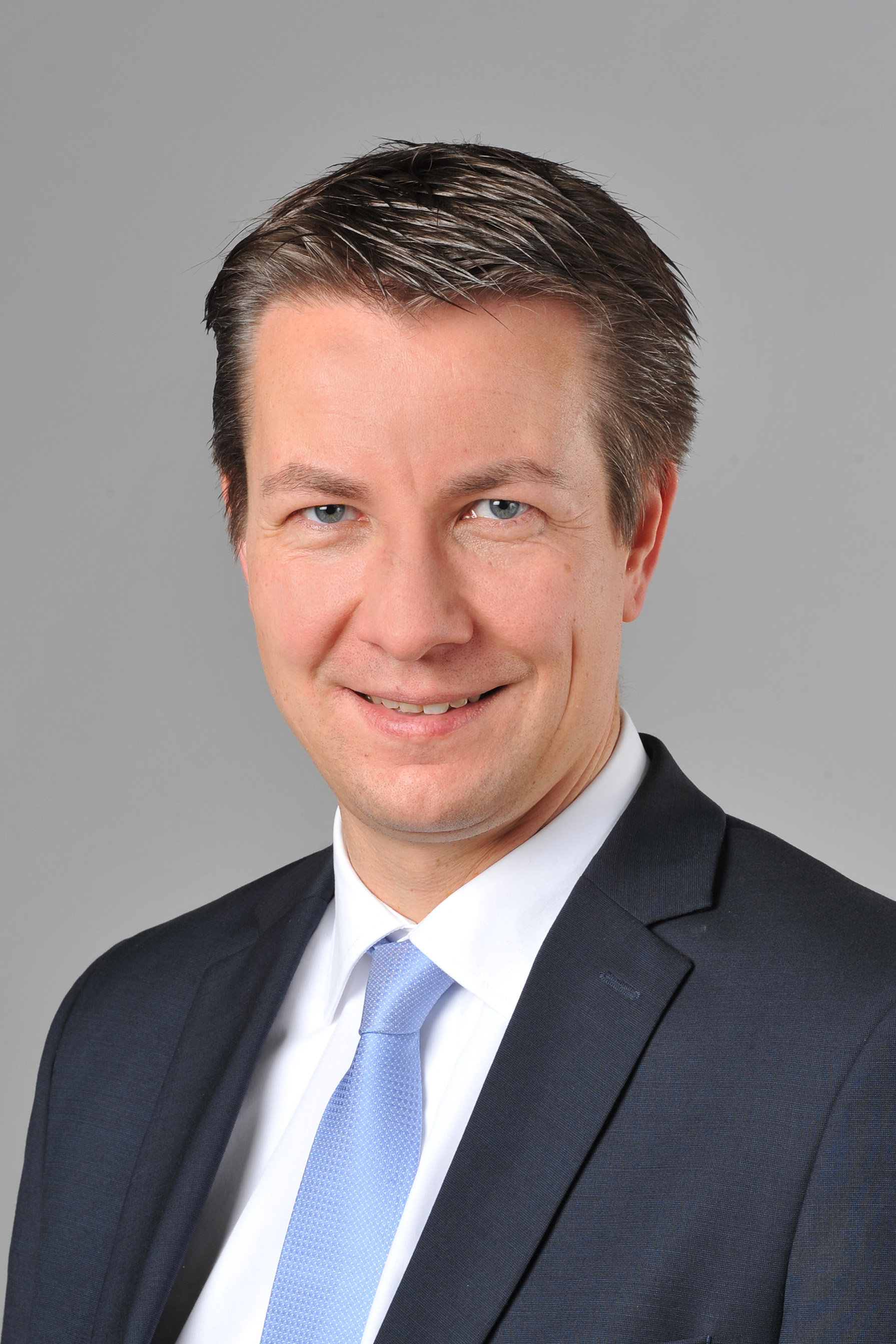
- Kerkhoff in 2013

Member of the Landtag of North Rhine-Westphalia
- Incumbent
- Assumed office 31 May 2012

Personal details
- Born: 3 September 1979 (age 46) Meschede
- Party: Christian Democratic Union (since 1998)

Matthias Kerkhoff (born 3 September 1979 in Meschede) is a German politician serving as a member of the Landtag of North Rhine-Westphalia since 2012. He has served as chief whip of the Christian Democratic Union since 2017.
