= South Westphalia University of Applied Sciences =

Public university in Iserlohn, Germany

South Westphalia University of Applied Sciences Fachhochschule Südwestfalen
- Type: Public
- Rector: Claus Schuster
- Administrative staff: 838, including 342 scientific staff and 59 teachers for special tasks (WS 2015/16)
- Students: 14.017 WS 2016/17 of which 30% are female
- Location: Iserlohn, NRW, Germany
- Website: www4.fh-swf.de

The South Westphalia University of Applied Sciences (German: Fachhochschule Südwestfalen) is a research institution located in the state of North Rhine-Westphalia, Germany. With more than 14,000 students, it is one of the largest of its kind in North Rhine-Westphalia. The headquarters and one of its four campuses are in Iserlohn. It has three more campuses located in Hagen, Meschede and Soest and a subsidiary in Lüdenscheid.

It offers a total of about 52 bachelor and master courses in the fields of Engineering, Natural Sciences, Information Technology, Business management and Agriculture. It offers courses for both full-time students and for those in employment. It also accommodates those who wish to combine vocational training with studies.

== History ==
The oldest forerunner of the university was the trade school in Hagen, founded by the Prussian reform politician Beuth on 1 December 1824, for the qualification for the Berlin Royal Technical Institute, which later became the State Engineering School for Mechanical Engineering and Electrical Engineering, and then the Märkische Fachhochschule, based in Iserlohn and the two locations Iserlohn and Hagen.

The Fachhochschule was founded on January 1, 2002, when the entire university education was disbanded in North Rhine-Westphalia and the Märkische Fachhochschule with the Fachhochschulabschaltungen Meschede and Soest of the former Gesamthochschule Paderborn was united as an equal partner. Seat of the Fachhochschule is Iserlohn.

The founding rector was Michael Teusner from 1 January 2002 to 31 August 2004. From 1 September 2004 to the end of 2008 Jörg Liese was rector of the university. On 9 December 2008 Claus Schuster was elected as the first president of the University of Applied Sciences Südwestfalen by the University Council, confirmed by the Senate of the university. After a reform by the Senate, the university management was renamed the Rectorate and Claus Schuster was elected Rector of the university on 9 December 2014.

== Timeline ==
The Fachhochschule Südwestfalen and its predecessors

Year	Location	Facility
1824	Hagen	Provincial vocational school Hagen
1852	Iserlohn	Provincial vocational school Iserlohn
1879	Iserlohn	Royal technical college for metal industry
1898	Hagen	Royal Higher Machine Building School
1918	Iserlohn	State technical school for metal industry
1919	Hagen	Higher machine building school Hagen
1923	Soest	Higher educational institution for practical farmers
1931	Hagen	Higher Technical School of Applied Engineering and Electrical Engineering
1938	Hagen	State Engineering School of Mechanical Engineering
1938	Iserlohn	State vocational school for metal industry
1947	Soest	Higher land building school
1948	Iserlohn	Engineering school for metalworking industry
1953	Hagen	State Engineering School of Construction
1959	Iserlohn	State Engineering School of Mechanical Engineering
1964	Soest / Meschede	State Engineering School of Mechanical Engineering with an outsider in Meschede
1966	Soest	Engineering School for Agriculture
1968	Meschede	State Engineering School of Mechanical Engineering in Meschede
1971	Hagen / Iserlohn	Fachhochschule Hagen with a department in Iserlohn
1971	Soest	Fachhochschule Südostwestfalen with the departments Höxter, Soest and Meschede and the integration of the engineering school for agriculture into the new Fachhochschule
1972	Meschede / Soest	University of Paderborn with the departments Höxter, Meschede, Soest and the Paderborn Department of the University of Applied Sciences Westphalia-Lippe
1988	Hagen / Iserlohn	Märkische Fachhochschule in Iserlohn with a department in Hagen

== Campus ==
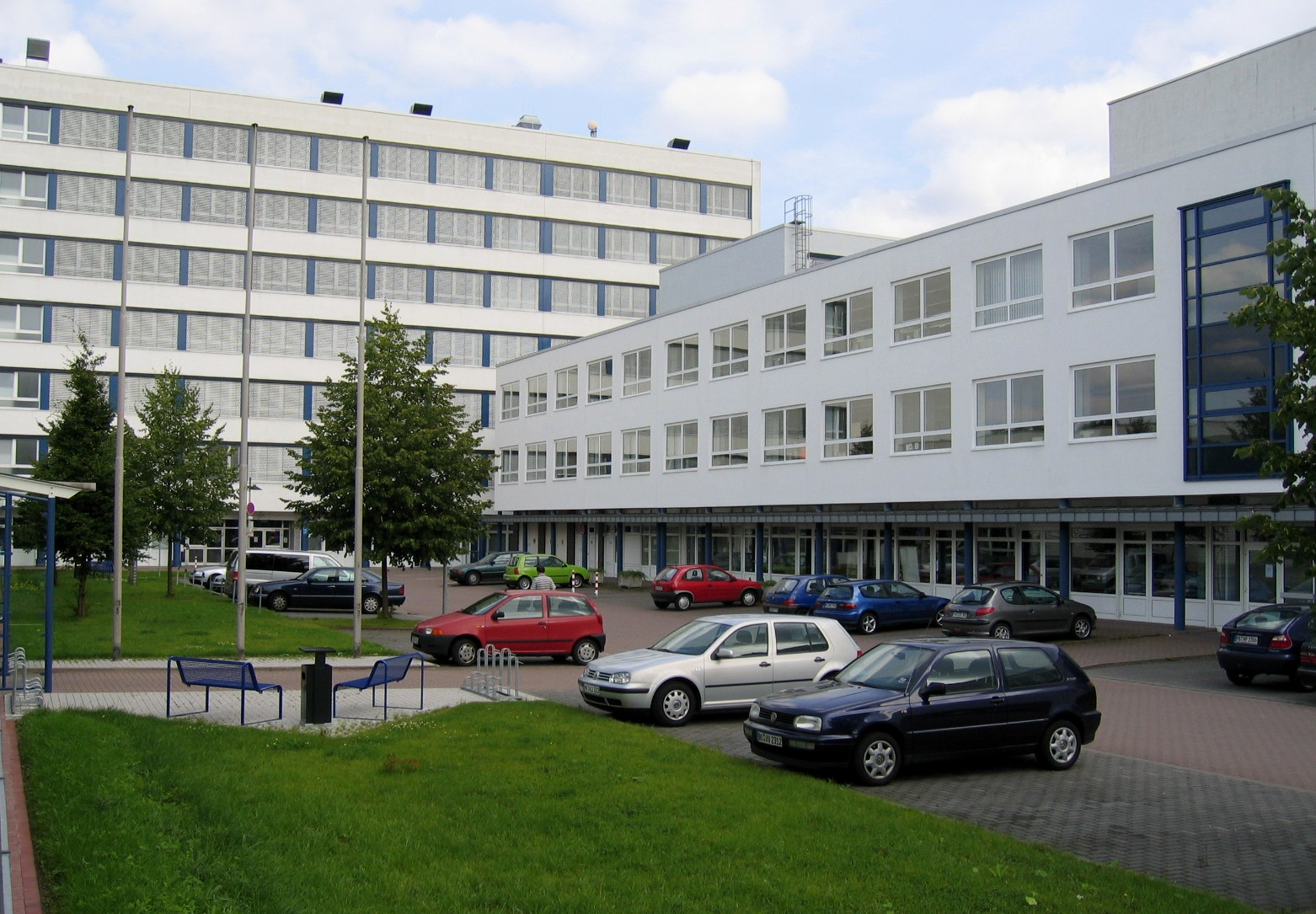
Campus Iserlohn

The South Westphalia University of Applied Sciences has four campuses located in Iserlohn (seat), Hagen, Meschede and Soest and a subsidiary in Lüdenscheid. The university strongly believes in small classes and personal support. The university is known for its student friendly environment.

== Research ==
Main areas of research include

- Aluminum Technology
- Applied Digital Image Processing
- Automation of Metalworking Processes in the Automotive Industry
- Soil Ecology / Soil Protection
- Computational Intelligence and Cognitive Systems
- Decentralized Power Supply
- Digital Audio Broadcasting
- Digital Signal Processing
- Finite Field Calculations
- Fuzzy Technology
- Gerontotechnology
- Integrated Supply Chain Management
- Corrosion Protection / Surface Technology
- Plastic technology
- Lightweight Construction and Aluminum Technology
- Life Science Analytics
- Mechatronics
- Nanoscale Materials
- New Lighting Technologies
- New Technologies for Electrical Power Generation
- Reduction of Pollutant Emissions
- Sensors / Actuators
- Chipless Production Processes and Production Design
- System Engineering and Management
- Forming Technology
- Environmentally Compatible Production Automation
- Environmentally Compatible and Appropriate Agriculture / Sustainable Agriculture
- Comparative City Marketing Research
- Water Management / Environmental Engineering
