= Lörmecke =

River in Germany

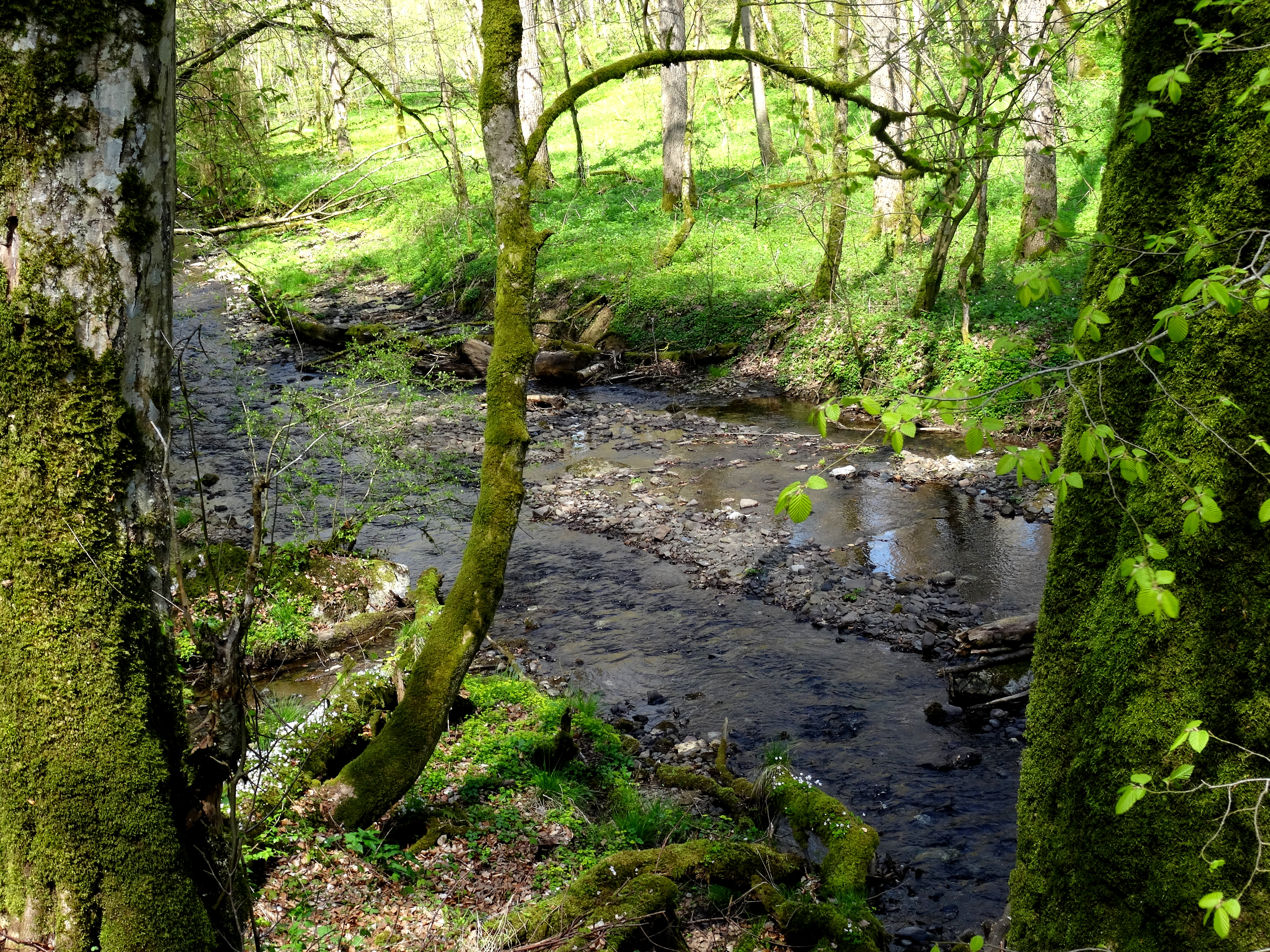

Location
- Country: Germany
- State: North Rhine-Westphalia

Physical characteristics
- Mouth
  - location: Glenne
  - coordinates: 51.4648°N 8.3922°E
- Length: 12.4 km (7.7 mi)

Basin features
- Progression: Glenne→ Möhne→ Ruhr→ Rhine→ North Sea

Lörmecke is a river of North Rhine-Westphalia, Germany. It flows into the Glenne near Warstein-Suttrop.

== See also ==
- List of rivers of North Rhine-Westphalia
