= Laura Hoffmann =

German association football player (b. 1991)

Personal information
- Full name: Laura Hoffmann
- Date of birth: 12 August 1991 (age 35)
- Place of birth: Meschede, Germany
- Height: 1.72 m (5 ft 7 1/2 in)
- Position: Defender

Team information
- Current team: SpVg Berghoven

Youth career
- SSV Meschede
- –2008: SG Wattenscheid 09

Senior career*
| Years | Team | Apps | (Gls) |
| 2008–2009 | SG Wattenscheid 09 | 31 | (2) |
| 2010–2011 | SG Essen-Schönebeck | 8 | (0) |
| 2010–2011 | → SG Essen-Schönebeck II | 9 | (1) |
| 2011–2015 | VfL Bochum | 52 | (0) |
| 2015–2016 | FSV Gütersloh 2009 | 9 | (0) |
| 2017 | VfL Bochum | 22 | (5) |
| 2018– | SpVg Berghoven | | |
- * Club domestic league appearances and goals

Laura Hoffmann (born 12 August 1991) is a German footballer who plays as a defender for SpVg Berghoven.

== Career ==
=== Statistics ===
As of 1 August 2019

| Club | Season | League | | | Cup | | Total | |
| Club | Season | Division | Apps | Goals | Apps | Goals | Apps | Goals |
|---|---|---|---|---|---|---|---|---|
| SG Wattenscheid 09 | 2007–08 | Bundesliga | 6 | 0 | | | | |
| SG Wattenscheid 09 | 2008–09 | 2. Bundesliga | 16 | 0 | | | | |
| SG Wattenscheid 09 | 2009–10 | 2. Bundesliga | 9 | 2 | 2 | 1 | 11 | 3 |
| SG Wattenscheid 09 | Total | | 31 | 2 | | | | |
| SG Essen-Schönebeck | 2009–10 | Bundesliga | 6 | 0 | 2 | 0 | 8 | 0 |
| SG Essen-Schönebeck | 2010–11 | Bundesliga | 2 | 0 | 0 | 0 | 2 | 0 |
| SG Essen-Schönebeck | Total | | 8 | 0 | 2 | 0 | 10 | 0 |
| SG Essen-Schönebeck II | 2010–11 | Regionalliga West | 9 | 1 | — | | 9 | 1 |
| SG Essen-Schönebeck II | Total | | 9 | 1 | 0 | 0 | 9 | 1 |
| VfL Bochum | 2011–12 | Regionalliga West | 21 | 0 | 1 | 0 | 22 | 0 |
| VfL Bochum | 2012–13 | Regionalliga West | 1 | 0 | — | | 1 | 0 |
| VfL Bochum | 2013–14 | 2. Bundesliga | 16 | 0 | 1 | 0 | 17 | 0 |
| VfL Bochum | 2014–15 | 2. Bundesliga | 14 | 0 | 1 | 0 | 15 | 0 |
| VfL Bochum | Total | | 52 | 0 | 3 | 0 | 55 | 0 |
| FSV Gütersloh 2009 | 2015–16 | 2. Bundesliga | 3 | 0 | 0 | 0 | 3 | 0 |
| FSV Gütersloh 2009 | 2016–17 | 2. Bundesliga | 6 | 0 | 2 | 1 | 8 | 1 |
| FSV Gütersloh 2009 | Total | | 9 | 0 | 2 | 1 | 11 | 1 |
| VfL Bochum | 2016–17 | Regionalliga West | 10 | 3 | — | | 10 | 3 |
| VfL Bochum | 2017–18 | Regionalliga West | 12 | 2 | 1 | 0 | 13 | 2 |
| VfL Bochum | Total | | 22 | 5 | 1 | 0 | 23 | 5 |
| SpVg Berghoven | 2017–18 | Regionalliga West | | | — | | | |
| SpVg Berghoven | 2018–19 | Regionalliga West | | | — | | | |
| SpVg Berghoven | 2019–20 | Regionalliga West | | | — | | | |
| SpVg Berghoven | Total | | | | | | | |
| Career total | | | | | | | | |
