= Langenberg (Westphalia) =

- Municipality
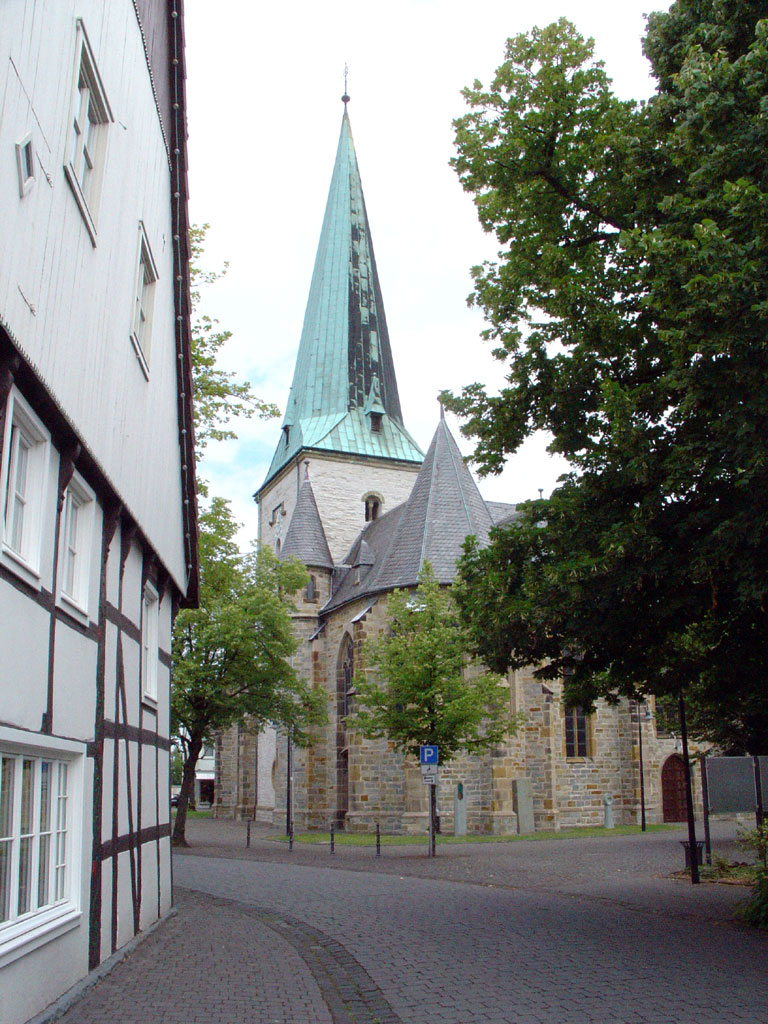
- St. Lambertus and Laurentius Church in Langenberg

- Flag Coat of arms

- Location of Langenberg within Gütersloh district
- Interactive map of Langenberg
- Location within Germany Location within North Rhine-Westphalia
- Coordinates: 51°46′59″N 08°19′00″E
- Country: Germany
- State: North Rhine-Westphalia
- Admin. region: Detmold
- District: Gütersloh
- Subdivisions: Benteler, Langenberg

Government
  - Mayor (2020–25): Susanne Mittag

Area
  - Total: 38.31 km^{2} (14.79 sq mi)
- Elevation: 75–112 m (246–367 ft)

Population (2025-12-31)
  - Total: 8,363
  - Density: 218.3/km^{2} (565.4/sq mi)
- Time zone: UTC+01:00 (CET)
  - Summer (DST): UTC+02:00 (CEST)
- Postal codes: 33449
- Dialling codes: 05248
- Vehicle registration: GT
- Website: www.langenberg.de

Langenberg (German pronunciation: [ˈlaŋənbɛʁk]) is a municipality in the district of Gütersloh in the state of North Rhine-Westphalia, Germany. It is located in the Teutoburg Forest, approx. 15 km south-west of Gütersloh and 30 km west of Paderborn.

== Population ==
Historical population

Year	Pop.	±% p.a.
1965	6,046	—
1970	6,384	+1.09%
1975	6,580	+0.61%
1980	6,507	−0.22%
1985	6,638	+0.40%
1990	7,026	+1.14%
1995	7,719	+1.90%

Year	Pop.	±% p.a.
2000	8,126	+1.03%
2005	8,186	+0.15%
2010	8,048	−0.34%
2015	8,375	+0.80%
2020	8,597	+0.52%
2025	8,363	−0.55%

Source: Landesdatabank Nordrhein-Westfalen
