= Langer Bach =

River in Germany

Location
- Country: Germany
- States: North Rhine-Westphalia

Physical characteristics
- Mouth
  - location: Wester
  - coordinates: 51.4264°N 8.3493°E

Basin features
- Progression: Wester→ Möhne→ Ruhr→ Rhine→ North Sea

Langer Bach is a small river of North Rhine-Westphalia, Germany. It is 4.2 km long and flows into the Wester as a right tributary near Warstein.

== See also ==
- List of rivers of North Rhine-Westphalia
