= Enste, North Rhine-Westphalia =

Coordinates: 51°22′N 8°15′E

Enste is a suburb of Meschede, in North Rhine-Westphalia.
