= Glenne (Möhne) =

River in Germany

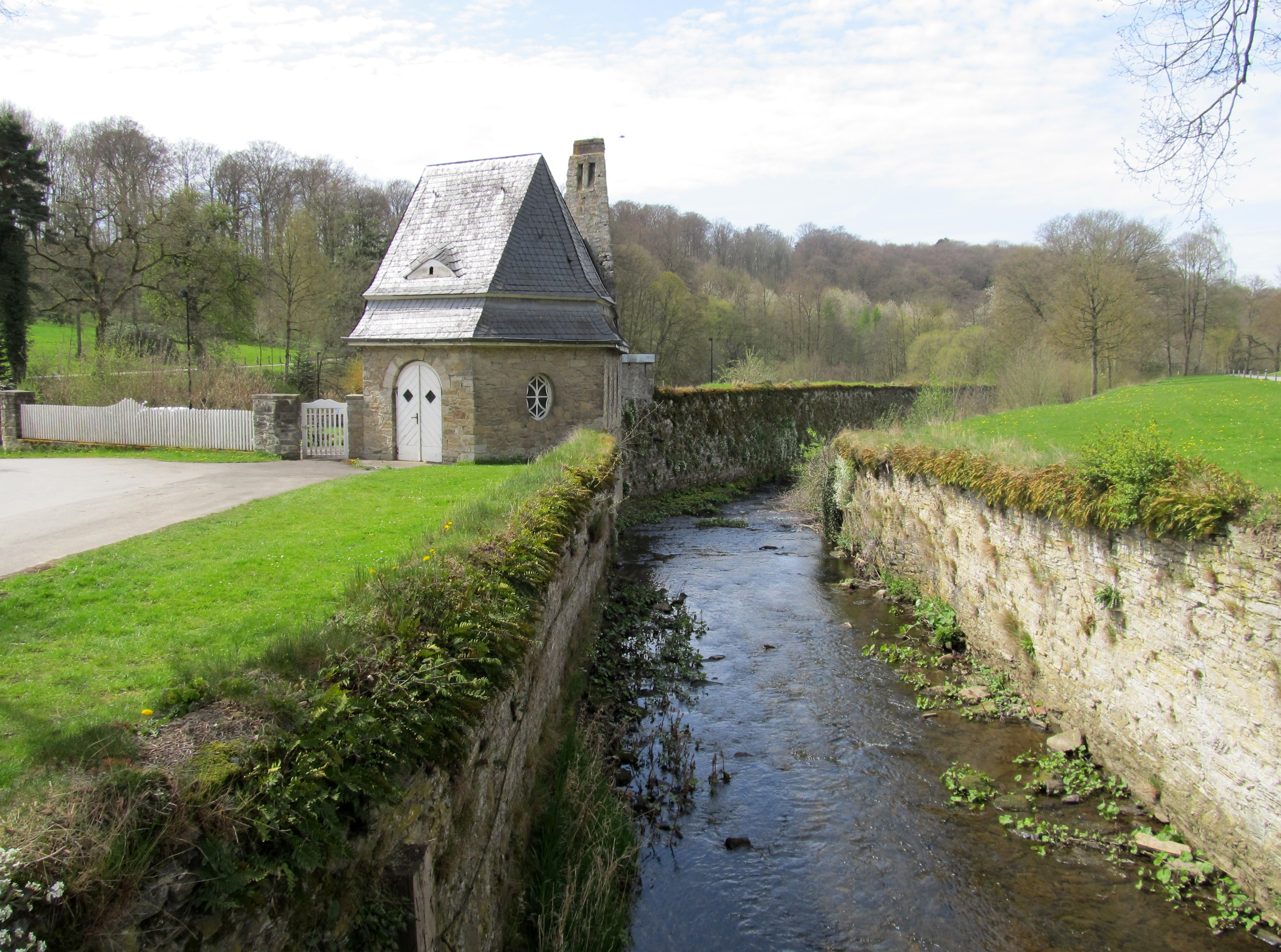

Location
- Country: Germany
- State: North Rhine-Westphalia

Physical characteristics
- Mouth
  - location: Möhne
  - coordinates: 51.4827°N 8.3894°E
- Length: 17.1 km (10.6 mi)

Basin features
- Progression: Möhne→ Ruhr→ Rhine→ North Sea

Glenne (German pronunciation: [ˈɡlɛnə]) is a river of North Rhine-Westphalia, Germany. It is a tributary of the Möhne.

== See also ==
- List of rivers of North Rhine-Westphalia
