= Wester (river) =

River in Germany

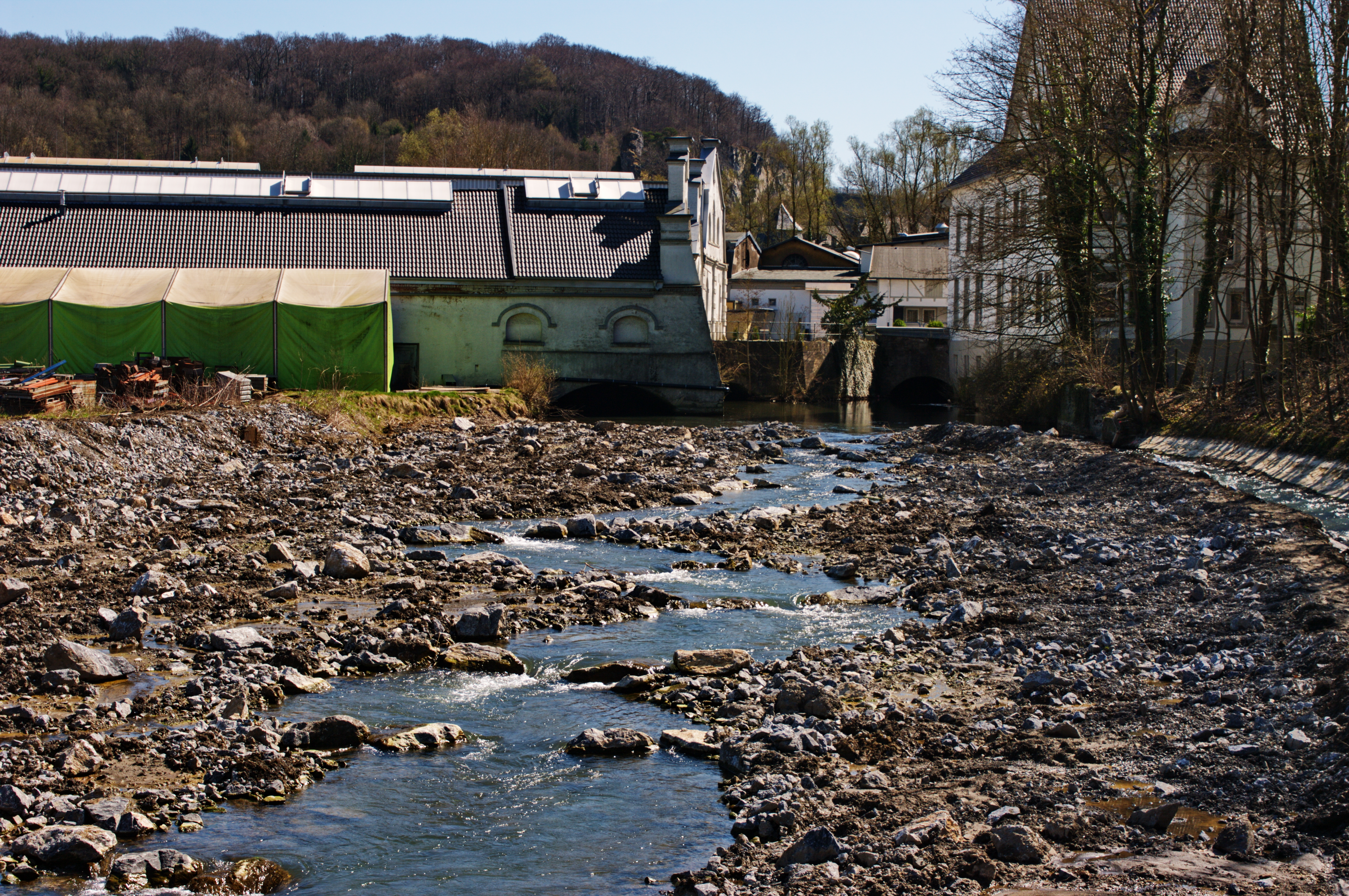

Location
- Country: Germany
- State: North Rhine-Westphalia

Physical characteristics
- Source
  - location: Warstein
- Mouth
  - location: Möhne
  - coordinates: 51.4889°N 8.3331°E
- Length: 14.3 km (8.9 mi)

Basin features
- Progression: Möhne→ Ruhr→ Rhine→ North Sea
- Tributaries
  - left: Schorenbach
  - right: Langer Bach, Treise

Wester (in its upper course: Wideybach) is a 14-km long river, a southern tributary of Möhne of North Rhine-Westphalia, Germany. It flows between the Warstein and Belecke subdivisions (German: ortsteil) of the town of Warstein.

== See also ==
- List of rivers of North Rhine-Westphalia
