= Bundesstraße 55 =

Federal highway in Germany

B 55
- Bundesstraße 55

Major junctions
- Southwest end: Jülich
- Northeast end: Rheda-Wiedenbrück

Location
- Country: Germany
- States: North Rhine-Westphalia

Highway system
- Roads in Germany; Autobahns; List; Federal; List; State; E-roads

The Bundesstraße 55 (abbr. B 55) is a Bundesstraße road in Germany, connecting Jülich with Rheda-Wiedenbrück via Cologne, Gummersbach, Olpe and Meschede.

== See also ==
- List of federal highways in Germany
