= Eversberg =

- Town of Meschede
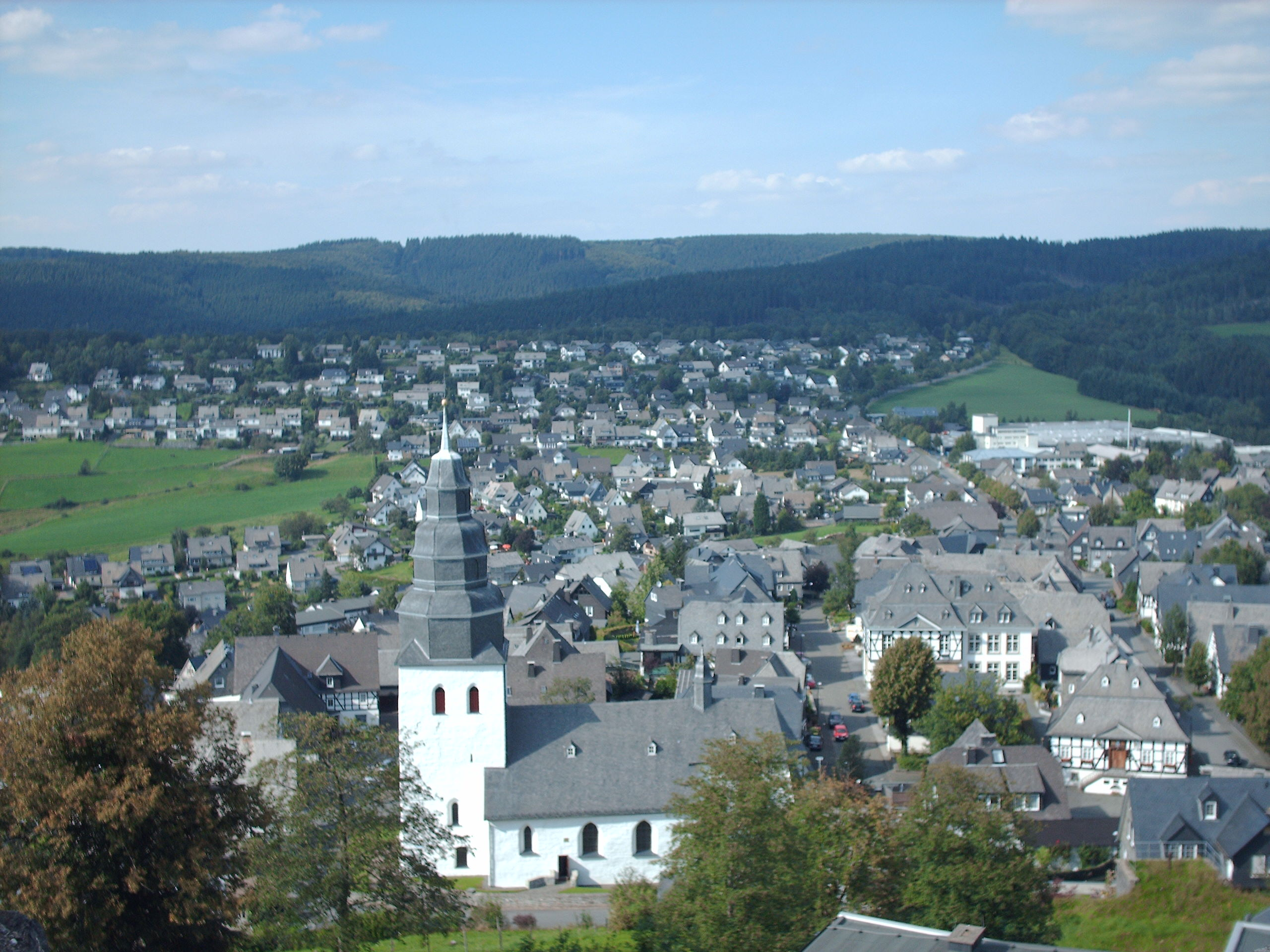
- Eversberg seen from the Castle Ruins

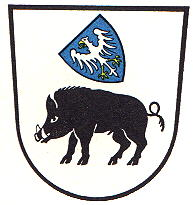
- Coat of arms
- Interactive map of Eversberg
- Location within Germany Location within North Rhine-Westphalia
- Coordinates: 51°22′05″N 08°20′09″E
- Country: Germany
- State: North Rhine-Westphalia
- Admin. region: Arnsberg
- District: Hochsauerlandkreis
- Town: Meschede
- Elevation: 377 m (1,237 ft)

Population (2025-12-31)
  - Total: 1,664
- Time zone: UTC+01:00 (CET)
  - Summer (DST): UTC+02:00 (CEST)
- Postal codes: 59872
- Dialling codes: 0291
- Vehicle registration: HSK
- Website: eversberg.de

Eversberg is a town with about 2,000 inhabitants in the federal state of North Rhine-Westphalia, Germany. The town is approximately 4 kilometres (2.5 mi) away from downtown Meschede and is well known for its delightful historical local centre with timber-framed houses.

== History ==
The history of the town dates back to the 11th century, when Count Gottfried von Arnsberg founded the castle of Eversberg, which today is a ruin.

Eversberg became part of Meschede in 1975 during a reorganizing process in North Rhine-Westphalia. In 1981 Eversberg won the national prize "Unser Dorf soll schöner werden" as one of the most beautiful towns in Germany.

== Sports ==
There is a small ski lift nearby, particularly suitable for children, with a difference in altitude of 25 metres (82 ft).
