= Meschede =

- Town
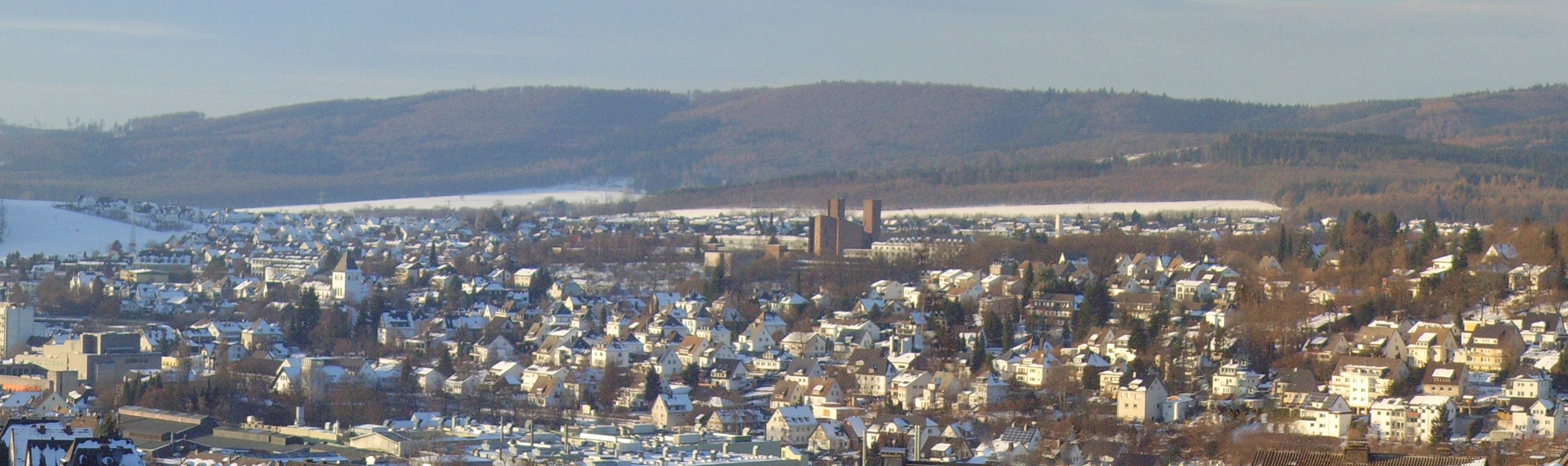
- View over Meschede

- Flag Coat of arms

- Location of Meschede within Hochsauerlandkreis district
- Interactive map of Meschede
- Location within Germany Location within North Rhine-Westphalia
- Coordinates: 51°21′N 8°17′E
- Country: Germany
- State: North Rhine-Westphalia
- Admin. region: Arnsberg
- District: Hochsauerlandkreis
- Subdivisions: 17

Government
  - Mayor (2020–25): Christoph Weber (CDU)

Area
  - Total: 218.5 km^{2} (84.4 sq mi)
- Elevation: 260 m (850 ft)

Population (2025-12-31)
  - Total: 29,446
  - Density: 134.8/km^{2} (349.0/sq mi)
- Time zone: UTC+01:00 (CET)
  - Summer (DST): UTC+02:00 (CEST)
- Postal codes: 59872
- Dialling codes: 0291
- Vehicle registration: HSK
- Website: www.meschede.de

Meschede (German: [ˈmɛʃədə]) is a town in the Hochsauerland district, in North Rhine-Westphalia, Germany. It is the capital of the district Hochsauerlandkreis.

== Education ==
One of the five branches of South Westphalia University of Applied Sciences (also: Fachhochschule Südwestfalen (FH SWF)) is located here.

== Geography ==
Meschede is situated in the Ruhr valley, near to the Hennesee, south of the nature-park Arnsberger Wald. Major towns in the vicinity of Meschede are Paderborn (51 km), Kassel (85 km), Siegen (57 km), Hagen, Dortmund (60 km) and Hamm (49 km).

=== Neighbouring municipalities ===
- Arnsberg
- Bestwig
- Eslohe
- Schmallenberg
- Sundern
- Warstein

=== Division of the town ===
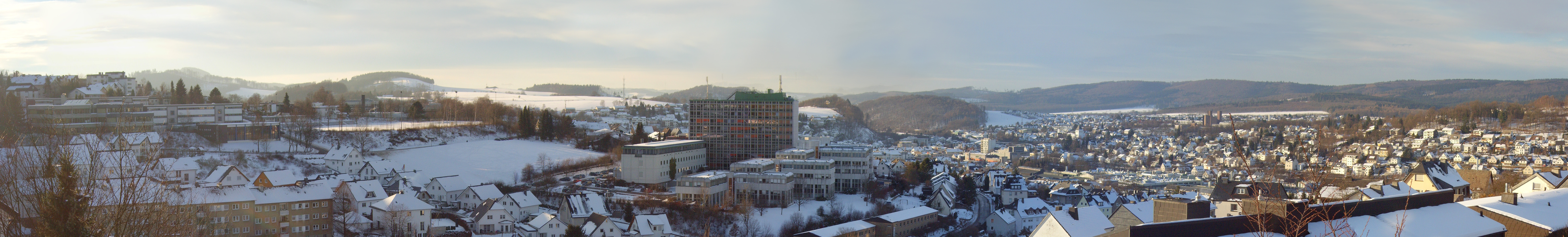
Panorama of Meschede

After the local government reforms of 1975 Meschede consists of these districts and villages:

- Baldeborn
- Berge
- Berghausen
- Beringhausen
- Blüggelscheidt
- Bockum
- Bonacker
- Calle
- Drasenbeck
- Einhaus
- Enkhausen
- Enste
- Ensthof
- Erflinghausen
- Eversberg
- Frenkhausen
- Freienohl
- Frielinghausen
- Galiläa
- Giesmecke
- Grevenstein
- Heggen
- Heinrichsthal
- Höhringhausen
- Horbach
- Immenhausen
- Klause
- Köpperkopf
- Köttinghausen
- Kotthoff
- Laer
- Löllinghausen
- Löttmaringhausen
- Mielinghausen
- Mosebolle
- Mülsborn
- Obermielinghausen
- Olpe
- Remblinghausen
- Schederberge
- Schedergrund
- Schüren
- Stesse
- Stockhausen
- Vellinghausen
- Visbeck
- Wallen
- Wehrstapel
- Wennemen
- Windhäuser
- Wulstern.

== History ==
Meschede was founded as a settlement around a convent, the Walpurgis-Stift, in the 10th century. In 1572, it became a member of the Hanseatic League.

In the 18th century, many inhabitants of Meschede died during at least two epidemics of dysentery.

Both in World War I and in World War II, Meschede was notorious as a location where the Germans exploited POWs in labour camps. In February 1945, the town was destroyed by Allied air raid bombings, because of its strategically important railway station, but rebuilt after the war.

In 1921, the Sauerländer Heimatbund was founded.

In 1970, Meschede's St. Walburga Hospital was the site of a smallpox outbreak, as described in the book The Demon in the Freezer by Richard Preston.

== Population ==
Historical population

| Year | Pop. | ±% p.a. |
|---|---|---|
| 1965 | 29,394 | — |
| 1970 | 31,637 | +1.48% |
| 1975 | 32,468 | +0.52% |
| 1980 | 31,354 | −0.70% |
| 1985 | 29,339 | −1.32% |
| 1990 | 31,715 | +1.57% |
| 1995 | 32,590 | +0.55% |

| Year | Pop. | ±% p.a. |
|---|---|---|
| 2000 | 32,679 | +0.05% |
| 2005 | 32,186 | −0.30% |
| 2010 | 30,823 | −0.86% |
| 2015 | 30,119 | −0.46% |
| 2020 | 29,696 | −0.28% |
| 2025 | 29,446 | −0.17% |

Source: Landesdatabank Nordrhein-Westfalen

== Economy ==
Meschede is the seat of three major companies:

- a department of Deutsche Telekom
- the Veltins Brewery
- the Honsel factory, founded in 1908, that produces car parts and other products from aluminium, owned by the Canadian company Martinrea.

An industrial zone is located near the crossing of the A 46 with the B 55 (see below).

Tourism also is important to the town's economy.

== Transportation ==
Meschede is connected with two national roads, the federal roads B 7 and B 55, and the motorway A 46.

Meschede has a railroad station, and is connected via the Sauerland Net, RB 57, to Arnsberg and other towns.

It has an airfield, the Meschede-Schüren Airfield, with a 900 m runway.

== Climate ==
The city's climate is continental. The lowest temperature recorded was −20 °C (−4 °F), its highest was recorded at 39 °C (102 °F).

== Culture ==
Spanish fricco is a traditional stew dish of Meschede.

== Mayors ==
- 1952–1961: Engelbert Dick (CDU)
- 1961–1969: Josef Busch (CDU)
- 1969–1974: Bruno Peus (CDU)
- 1975–1998: Franz Stahlmecke (CDU)
- 1998–1999: Bruno Peus (CDU)
- 1999–2015: Hans-Ulrich (Uli) Hess (CDU)
- 2015–present: Christoph Weber (CDU)

== Notable people ==
- Joseph Hippolyt Pulte (1811–1884), homeopathic physician
- August Macke (1887–1914), painter
- Bonifatius Stirnberg (1933-2025), sculptor, author of sculptures Vogelbrunnen, Puppenbrunnen, Zunftbrunnen, Treidelbrunnen, Amtsschimmel-Brunnen and Spatzenbrunnen
- Carola Matthiesen (1943–2015), German University Teacher
- Klaus-Jürgen Wrede (born 1963), board game creator, author of the Carcassonne
- Matthias Ungemach (born 1968), rower, trained here
- Matthias Kerkhoff (born 1979), politician (CDU)
- Laura Hoffmann (born 1991), footballer
- Susanne Kreher (born 1998), skeleton racer
- Hannah Neise (born 2000), skeleton racer
- Alexandra Föster (born 2002), rower

== Main sights ==
- Abbey Königsmünster, built by the Order of Saint Benedict.
- Lake Hennesee near Meschede is the main recreational area of the town.

== Twin towns – sister cities ==
Meschede is twinned with:

- Cousolre, France (1965)
- Le Puy-en-Velay, France (1975)

Meschede also has friendly relations with:

- Neufraunhofen, Germany
