= Rüthen =

- Town
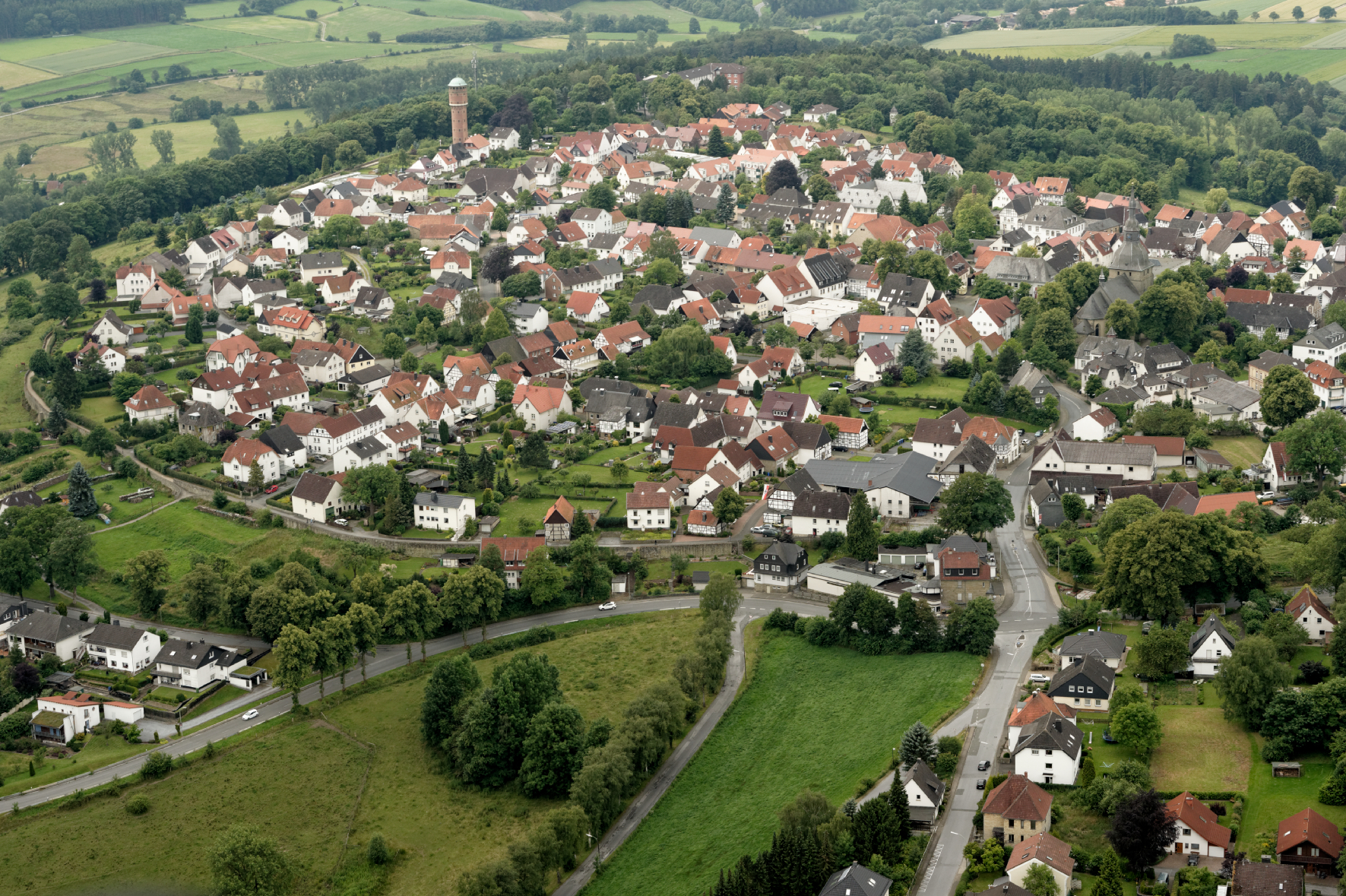
- Aerial photograph of Rüthen

- Flag Coat of arms

- Location of Rüthen within Soest district
- Interactive map of Rüthen
- Location within Germany Location within North Rhine-Westphalia
- Coordinates: 51°29′36″N 8°29′0″E
- Country: Germany
- State: North Rhine-Westphalia
- Admin. region: Arnsberg
- District: Soest
- Subdivisions: 15

Government
  - Mayor (2020–25): Peter Weiken

Area
  - Total: 158.15 km^{2} (61.06 sq mi)
- Elevation: 280–440 m (920–1,440 ft)

Population (2025-12-31)
  - Total: 10,302
  - Density: 65.141/km^{2} (168.71/sq mi)
- Time zone: UTC+01:00 (CET)
  - Summer (DST): UTC+02:00 (CEST)
- Postal codes: 59602
- Dialling codes: 02952
- Vehicle registration: SO
- Website: www.ruethen.de

Rüthen (German pronunciation: [ˈʁyːtn̩]) is a town in the district of Soest, in North Rhine-Westphalia, Germany.

== Geography ==
Rüthen is situated at the northeastern border of the natural preserve Arnsberger Wald between the Haarstrang and the valley of the river Möhne, approx. 20 km south of Lippstadt and 35 kilometres (22 mi) south-west of Paderborn. The highest point is the Wehberg with a height of 528.9 metres (1,735 ft), the lowest point the valley of the river Pöppelsche at 130 metres (430 ft). With an area of more than 310 square kilometres (120 sq mi) it is the largest town within the district of Soest.

=== Neighbouring municipalities ===
- Anröchte
- Bestwig
- Brilon
- Büren
- Erwitte
- Geseke
- Lippstadt
- Olsberg
- Warstein

=== Division of the town ===
Today Rüthen is the commune largest in area in the district of Soest with an area of 158 square kilometres (61 mi^{2}). After the local government reforms of 1975 Rüthen consists of the following 15 districts:

- Rüthen (5,360 inhabitants)
- Altenrüthen (550 inhabitants)
- Drewer (780 inhabitants)
- Hemmern (170 inhabitants)
- Hoinkhausen (170 inhabitants)
- Kallenhardt (1,810 inhabitants)
- Kellinghausen (90 inhabitants)
- Kneblinghausen (310 inhabitants)
- Langenstraße-Heddinghausen (460 inhabitants)
- Meiste (410 inhabitants)
- Menzel (426 inhabitants)
- Nettelstädt (111 inhabitants)
- Oestereiden (870 inhabitants)
- Weickede (25 inhabitants)
- Westereiden (530 inhabitants)

== International relations ==
Rüthen is twinned with:

- Dereham (United Kingdom) – since 1983
- Egeln (Saxony-Anhalt, Germany) – since 1991

== History ==
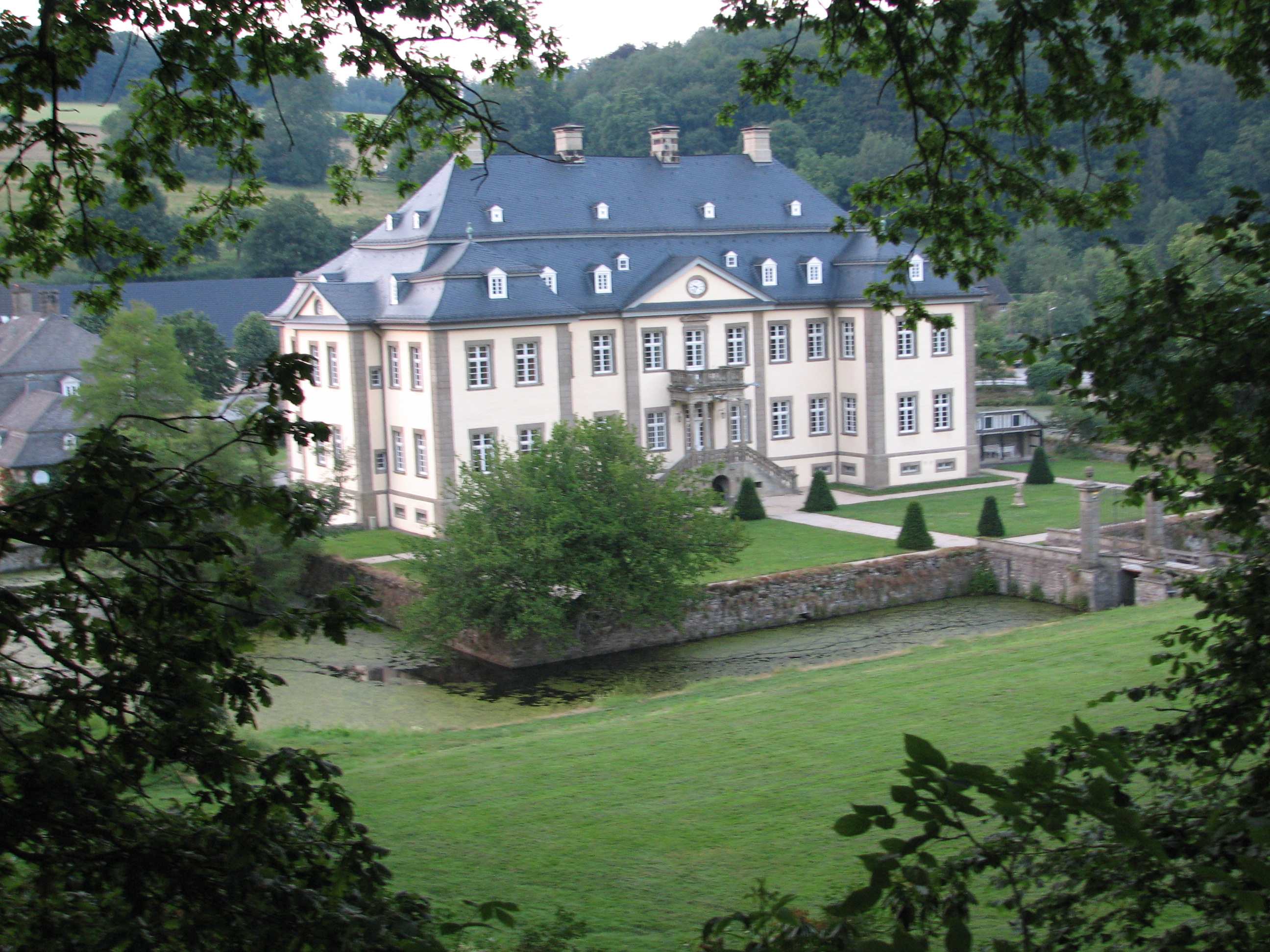
Schloss Körtlinghausen near Rüthen

The city of Rüthen was first mentioned in a document of the Kloster Grafschaft (abbey earldom) in 1072. The area around Rüthen already belonged to the Erzbistum Köln (archbishopric Cologne) in the High Middle Ages. On 29 September 1200 Rüthen was given town law by the sovereign, the archbishop of Cologne Adolf I. von Altena. Starting in 1375 Rüthen belonged to the Hanse, an economic alliance of trading cities and their guilds that dominated trade along the coast of Northern Europe in the later Middle Ages. The merchants of the city had far reaching business connections and because of that were able to ensure wealth. In the following centuries, however, the importance of Rüthen decreased massively.

Like many other cities in the duchy of Westfalen, Rüthen held witch trials. From 1573 to 1660, 104 people were tried as witches and wizards, at least 79 being sentenced to death. Freund Happen, who had been accused of being a sorcerer, was discharged after two months of torture on 23 September 1660.

=== Population development ===
Historical population

Year	Pop.	±% p.a.
1819	1,739	—
1825	1,823	+0.79%
1831	1,899	+0.68%
1837	1,863	−0.32%
1843	2,040	+1.52%
1849	2,006	−0.28%
1855	1,896	−0.94%
1861	1,899	+0.03%
1867	1,794	−0.94%
1875	1,652	−1.03%
1880	1,783	+1.54%
1885	1,723	−0.68%
1890	1,859	+1.53%
1895	2,018	+1.65%
1900	2,072	+0.53%
1905	2,218	+1.37%
1910	2,295	+0.68%

Year	Pop.	±% p.a.
1939	2,622	+0.46%
1950	3,541	+2.77%
1961	4,160	+1.48%
1965	10,494	+26.03%
1970	11,087	+1.11%
1975	11,330	+0.43%
1980	11,232	−0.17%
1985	10,864	−0.66%
1990	11,253	+0.71%
1995	11,709	+0.80%
2000	11,500	−0.36%
2005	11,143	−0.63%
2010	10,510	−1.16%
2015	11,095	+1.09%
2020	10,565	−0.97%
2025	10,302	−0.50%

Source: Landesdatabank Nordrhein-Westfalen (1965-2025)

== Signs ==
=== Buildings ===
- Catholic Church St. Nikolaus. The church was built in the 13th century after a fire in the city. Its tower received its current top in 1712.
- Catholic Church St. Johannes der Täufer. The other Catholic Church in Rüthen was built 1871–1874 with an older tower from 1737. In this tower there is a madonna figure generally considered the oldest piece of art of Rüthen.
- Former Abbey of the order of capuchins. What used to be an abbey now houses 13 apartments. The historic garden has been reconstructed.
- Former Abbey of the order of ursulines The 1749-built abbey was built exactly where 10 years earlier an abbey of another order burned down. Today it houses a bank.
- The old cityhall is a 1726- to 1730-built complex noticeable for its façade and big, curved flight of stairs.
- Of the medieval town fortifications, aside big parts of the city wall, only the Hachtor and the Hexenturm (witches' tower) still exist. The Hachtor is an old town gate that has also been used as a prison.
- The Jewish cemetery from 1625 is the oldest of its kind in Westfalen, located right next to the Hachtor.

In the village of Kallenhardt you can find Schloss Körtlinghausen (1714), a small castle surrounded by water, a catholic church from 1722 and an old cityhall from the 14th or 15th century.

=== Nature ===
The Hohler Stein in Kallenhardt is a big cave in which archaeological findings from the Stone Age and Bronze Age were made.

== People ==
- Michael Stappert (around 1585/1590–1663), country priest and critic of witch-hunting
- Jürgen Augustinowitz (born 1964), CDU, Politician, Member of the Bundestag from 1990 until 1998
- Jürgen Haselünne (around 1821–1890), pedagogue
- Anton Kopp (1796–1870), vicar general of Chicago, founder of Westphalia (Michigan)
- Stefan Gödde (born 1975), TV host
- Joachim Winterscheidt (born 1979), Actor and Presenter
- Marcel Höttecke (born 1987), footballer
- Norman Harras, (born 1996), professional wrestler
