= Möhne =

River in western Germany

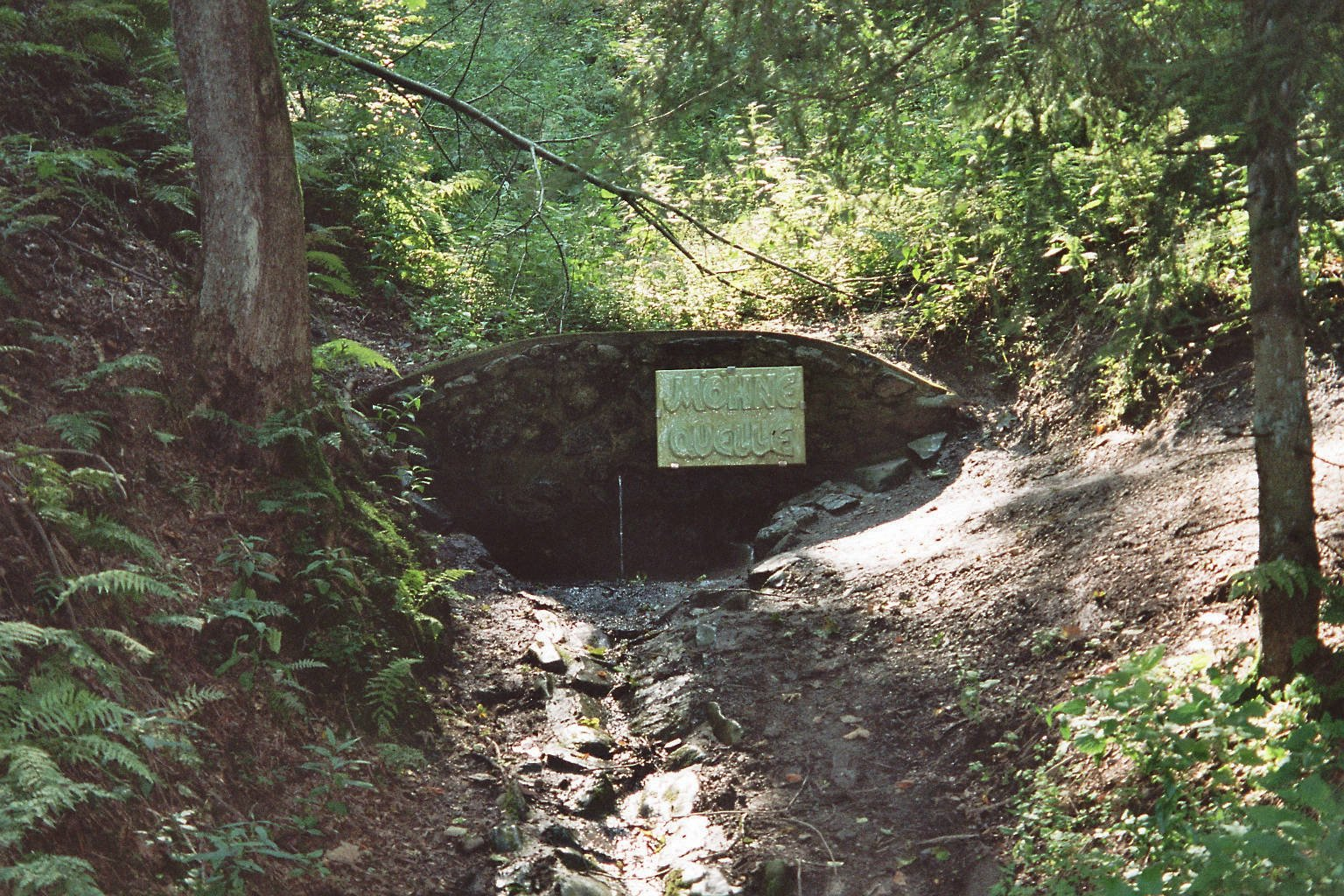
- The source of the Möhne

Location
- Country: Germany
- State: North Rhine-Westphalia

Physical characteristics
- Source
  - location: Sauerland
  - elevation: 550 m (1,800 ft)
- Mouth
  - location: Ruhr
  - coordinates: 51°27′25″N 7°57′17″E
- Length: 65.1 km (40.5 mi)
- Basin size: 469 km^{2} (181 sq mi)

Basin features
- Progression: Ruhr→ Rhine→ North Sea

The Möhne (German pronunciation: [ˈmøːnə]) is a river in North Rhine-Westphalia, Germany. It is a right tributary of the Ruhr. The Möhne passes the towns of Brilon, Rüthen and Warstein. There is a large artificial lake near the mouth of the river, the Möhne Reservoir, used for hydro power generation and leisure activities.

The Möhne dam was a major target for the RAF during the Second World War, famously during the Dambusters raid by the RAF.

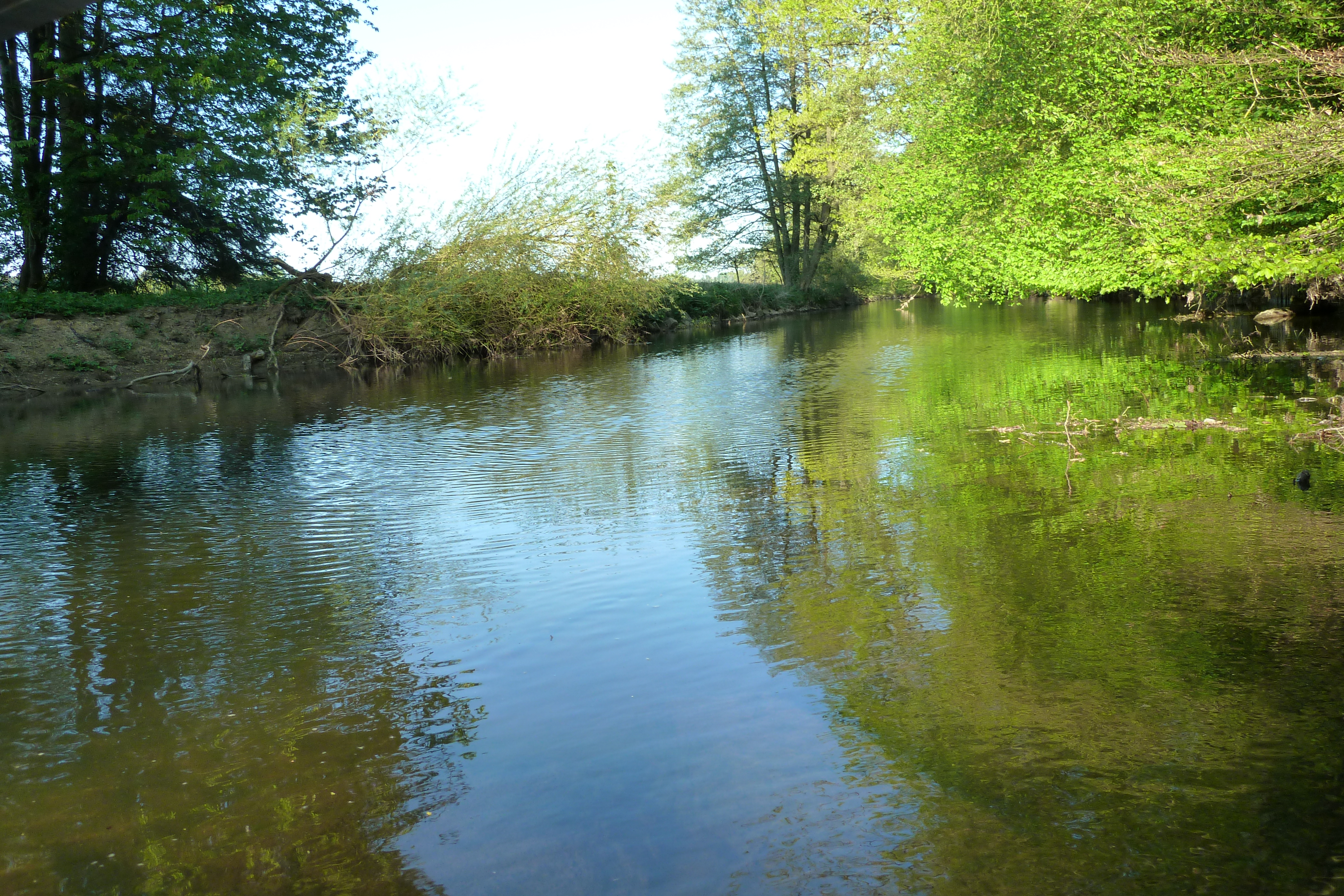
The Möhne near Warstein-Mülheim

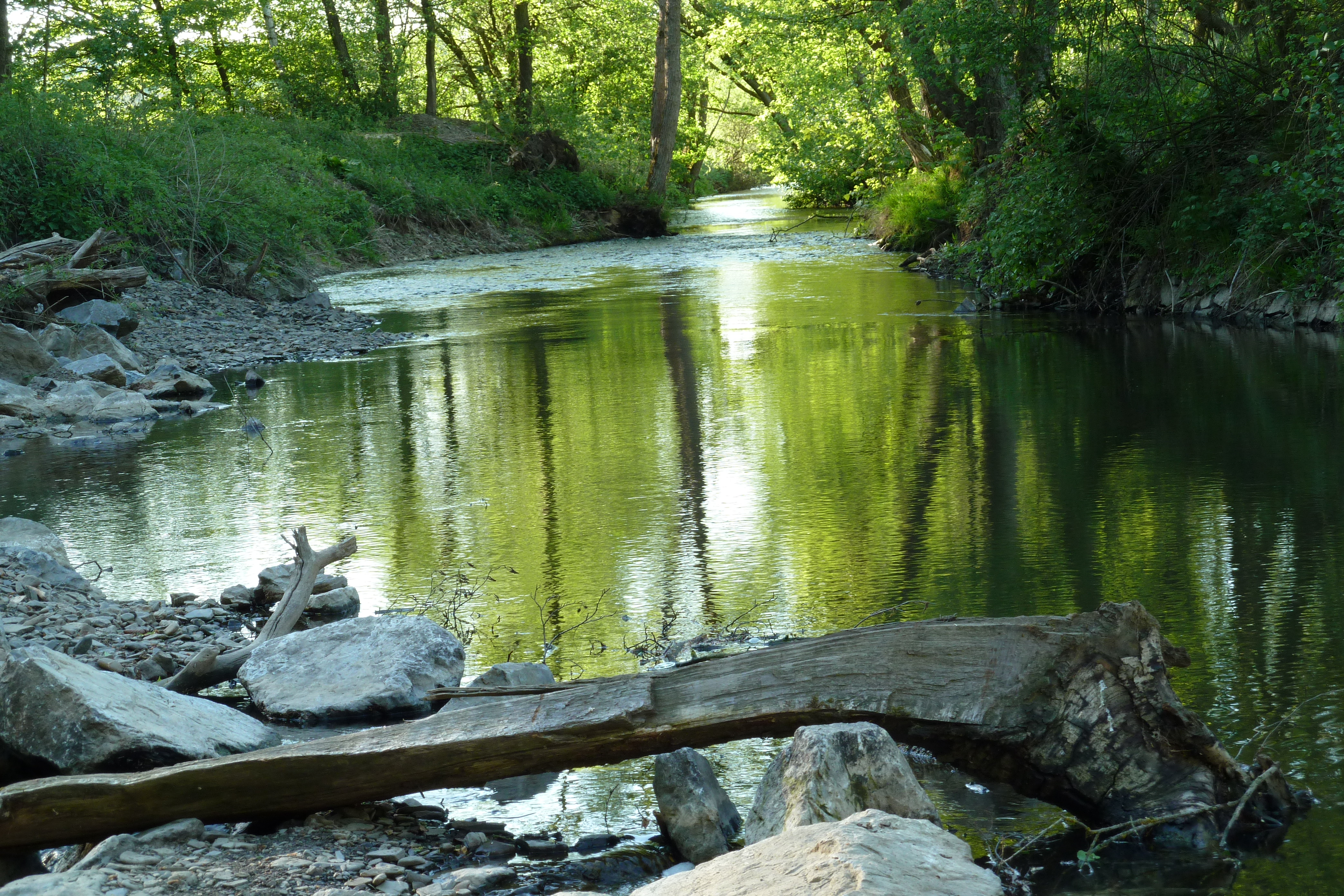
The Möhne near Warstein-Mülheim
