= Stakelberger Bach =

River in Germany

Location
- Country: Germany
- State: North Rhine-Westphalia

Physical characteristics
- Mouth
  - location: Wimberbach
  - coordinates: 51.4790°N 7.8824°E

Basin features
- Progression: Wimberbach→ Ruhr→ Rhine→ North Sea

Stakelberger Bach is a river of North Rhine-Westphalia, Germany. It is 7.4 km (4.6 mi) long and flows into the Wimberbach as a right tributary near Wickede.

== See also ==
- List of rivers of North Rhine-Westphalia
