= Gebke =

Gebke may refer to following rivers of North Rhine-Westphalia, Germany:

- Gebke (Meschede), right tributary of the Ruhr in Meschede
- Gebke (Wennemen), right tributary of the Ruhr in Wennemen
- Kleine Gebke, right tributary of the Ruhr in Meschede
