= Wanne =

Wanne may refer to:

- Hampus Wanne (born 1993), Swedish handballer
- Theo Wanne (born 1967), American saxophone manufacturer and saxophone mouthpiece designer
- Wanne, Belgium, a village in the Belgian municipality of Trois-Ponts
- Wanne, Germany, a borough of the German city of Tübingen
- Wanne, a settlement today part of Herne, North Rhine-Westphalia, Germany
  - Wanne-Eickel Hauptbahnhof, the railway station here
- Wanne (Möhne), a river in North Rhine-Westphalia, Germany, tributary of the Möhne
- Wanne (Ruhr), a river in North Rhine-Westphalia, Germany, tributary of the Ruhr
- De Wanne, former restaurant in the Netherlands
