= Oesber Bach =

River in Germany

Location
- Country: Germany
- States: North Rhine-Westphalia

Physical characteristics
- Mouth
  - location: Wimberbach
  - coordinates: 51.4556°N 7.8653°E

Basin features
- Progression: Wimberbach→ Ruhr→ Rhine→ North Sea

Oesber Bach is a small river of North Rhine-Westphalia, Germany. It is 2.2 km (1.4 mi) long and flows as a right tributary into the Wimberbach near Wickede.

== See also ==
- List of rivers of North Rhine-Westphalia
