= Springebach =

River in Germany

Location
- Country: Germany
- State: North Rhine-Westphalia

Physical characteristics
- Mouth
  - location: Hillebach
  - coordinates: 51.2395°N 8.5545°E

Basin features
- Progression: Hillebach→ Ruhr→ Rhine→ North Sea

Springebach (also: Gröne) is a small river of North Rhine-Westphalia, Germany. It flows into the Hillebach near Winterberg.

== See also ==
- List of rivers of North Rhine-Westphalia
