= Wannebach =

Wannebach may refer to:

- Wannebach (Lenne), a river of North Rhine-Westphalia, Germany, right tributary of the Lenne
- Wannebach (Ruhr, Westhofen), a river of North Rhine-Westphalia, Germany, right tributary of the Ruhr
- Wannebach (Ruhr, Ergste), a river of North Rhine-Westphalia, Germany, left tributary of the Ruhr
