= Bürenbruch =

Bürenbruch is a part of Ergste, a district of Schwerte. It lies south of the Ruhr near Sauerland and is mainly used for silviculture and agriculture. At 2012 Bürenbruch had a population of 243 inhabitants.

== Geology ==
In Bürenbruch are a few streams, for example the Lollenbach and the Wannebach.

== History ==
Before 1975, Bürenbruch belongs to the county Iserlohn (Kreis Iserlohn).

A street of Bürenbruch, the Michaelisweg, is a historical path through which in earlier centuries the tithe on Michaelmas Day (September 29) was placed in the form of agricultural products from the fief to the castle Hohen Limburg of Hagen-Hohenlimburg.

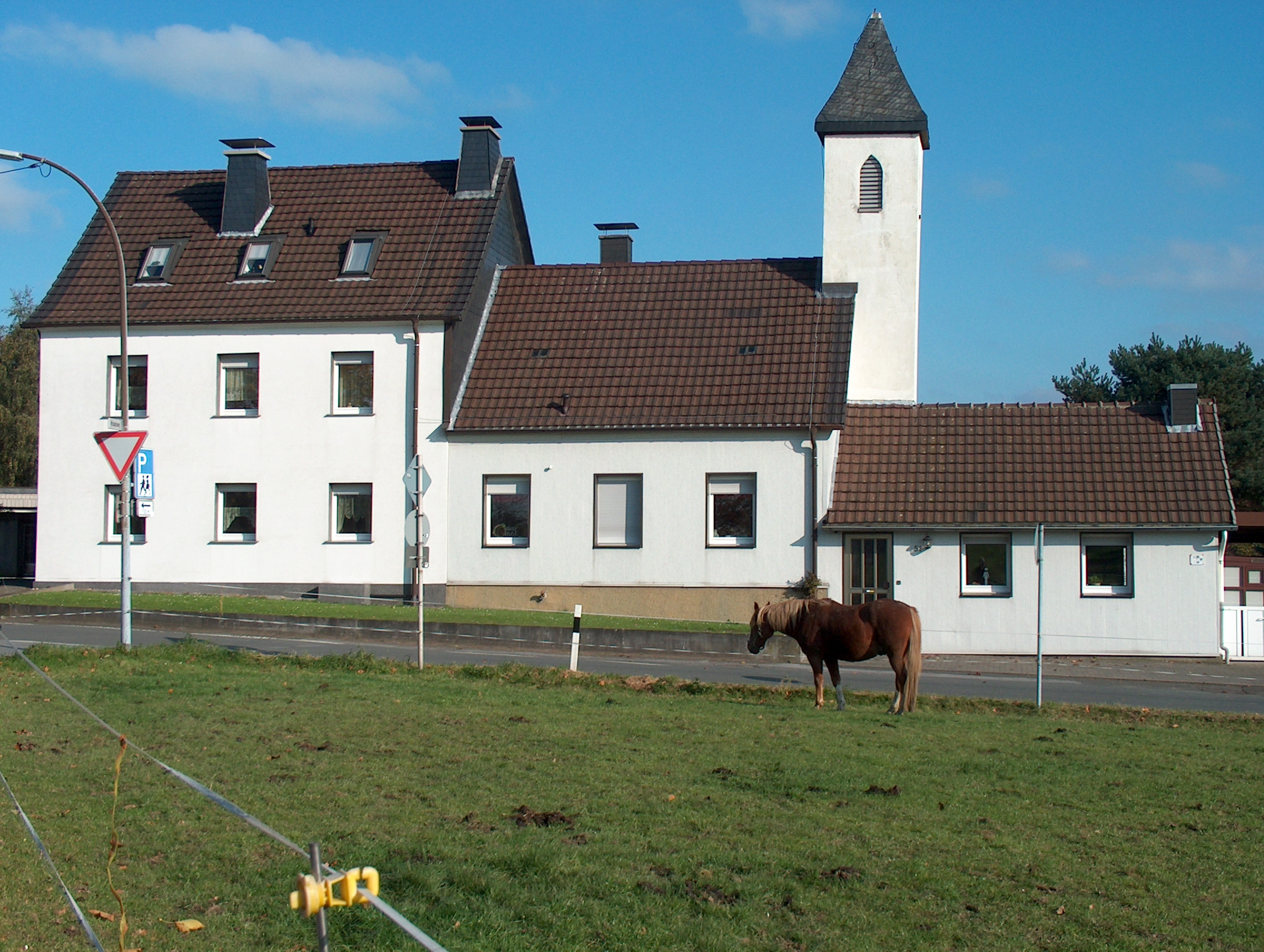
The former single-class School in Bürenbruch

The former evangelical, single-class school in Bürenbruch, was named Reingsen zu Bürenbruch, because the previous school was in Reingsen, another part of Ergste. The school was built in Bürenbruch in 1855. It was closed in 1967 and is now privately owned.
