= Lollenbach =

River in Germany

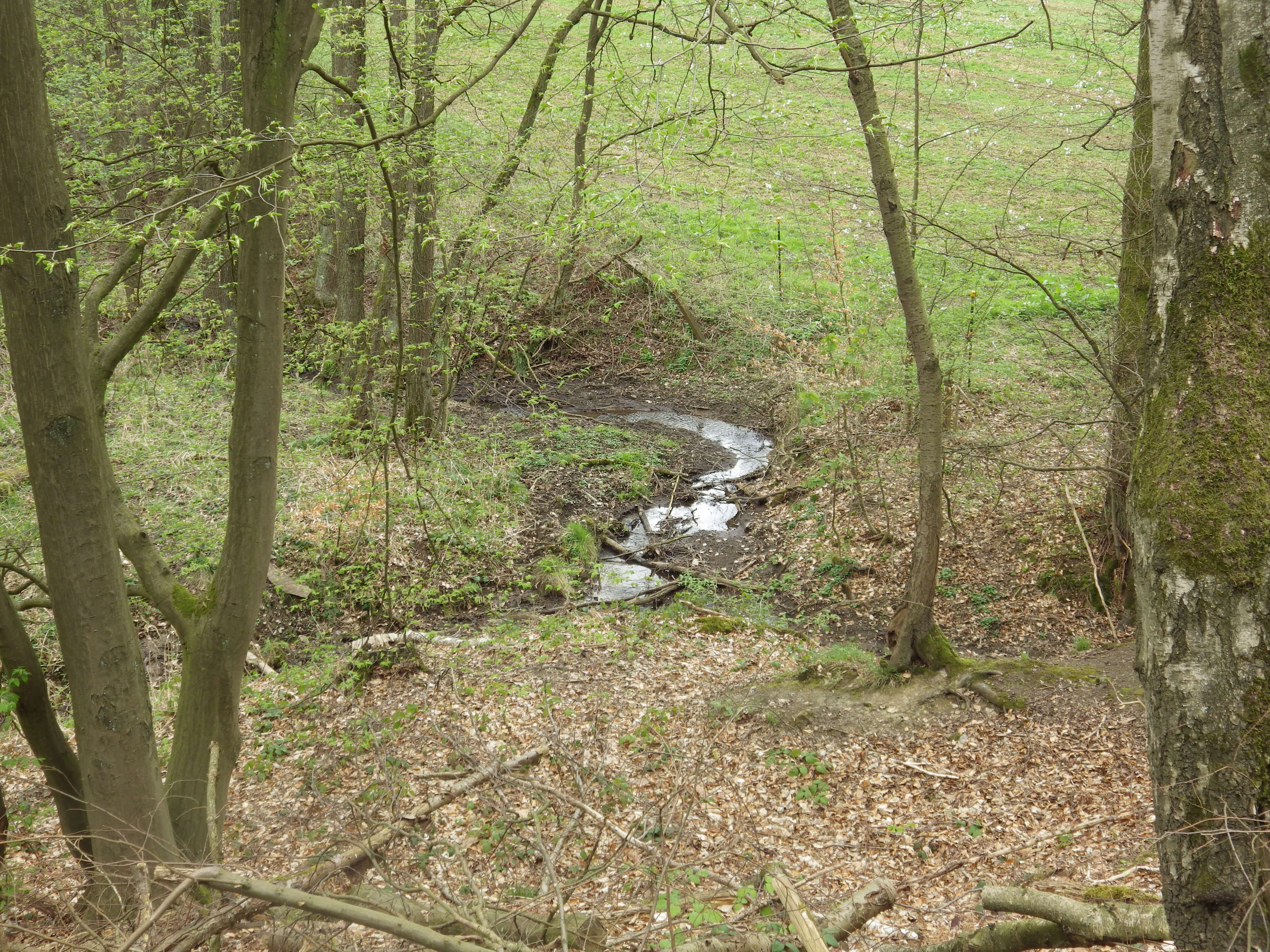

Location
- Country: Germany
- State: North Rhine-Westphalia

Physical characteristics
- Mouth
  - location: Elsebach
  - coordinates: 51.4119°N 7.6253°E
- Length: 4.03 km (2.50 mi)

Basin features
- Progression: Elsebach→ Ruhr→ Rhine→ North Sea

Lollenbach is a stream of North Rhine-Westphalia, Germany. Its source is between Bürenbruch (a part of Ergste) and Letmathe. The stream has a length of 4.03 km (2.50 mi). Near Reingsen, a part of Schwerte, Lollenbach and Reingser Bach merge to form the Elsebach. Lollenbach is used as a supplier of water for a small fish pond.

== See also ==
- List of rivers of North Rhine-Westphalia
