= Reingsen =

Reingsen is a part of Ergste, a district of Schwerte, Germany. Before 1975, Reingsen belonged to the county Iserlohn (Kreis Iserlohn). In 2012 Reingsen had a population of 110 inhabitants. It lies south of the river Ruhr near Sauerland and is mainly used for agriculture.

== Geology ==
In Reingsen there are two streams, the Lollenbach and the Reingser Bach.
