= Balkenhol =

Balkenhol is a German surname. Notable people with the surname include:

- Anabel Balkenhol (born 1972), German Olympic dressage rider
- Bernhard Balkenhol (1914–2004), German politician
- Klaus Balkenhol (born 1939), German equestrian and Olympic champion
- Stephan Balkenhol (born 1957), German sculptor
