= Hassbach =

Hassbach or Haßbach may refer to:

- Haßbach (Ruhr), a tributary of the Ruhr in North Rhine-Westphalia, Germany
- Haßbach (Lower Austria), a locality of the town Warth, Lower Austria
