= Schledde =

Schledde may refer to:

- Schledde (Ahse), a river of North Rhine-Westphalia, Germany, tributary of the Ahse
- Schledde (Störmeder Bach), a river of North Rhine-Westphalia, Germany, tributary of the Störmeder Bach
- Ansgar Schledde (born 1977), German politician
