= Wannebach (Ruhr, Ergste) =

River in Germany

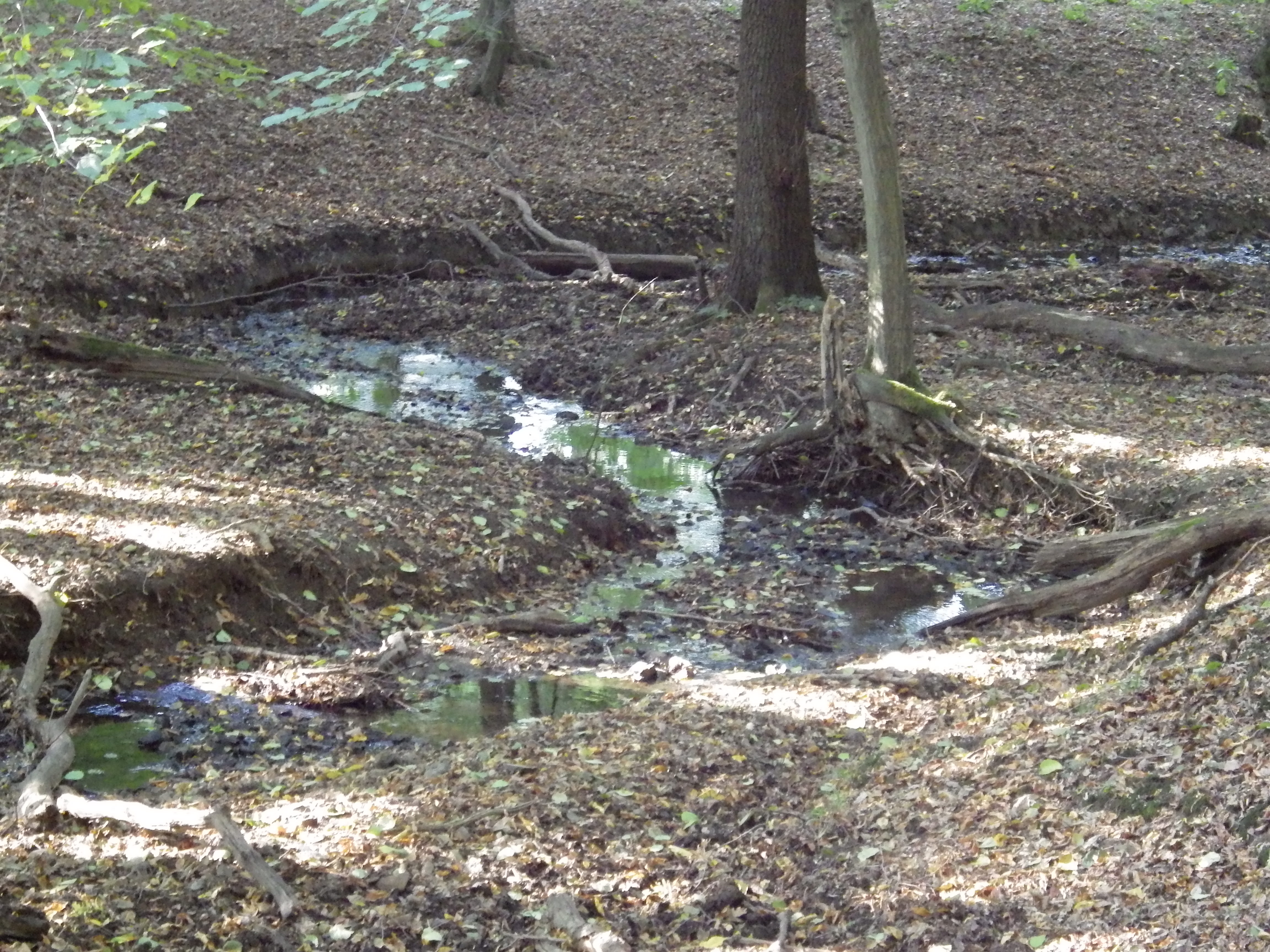

Location
- Country: Germany
- State: North Rhine-Westphalia

Physical characteristics
- Mouth
  - location: Ruhr
  - coordinates: 51.4191°N 7.5583°E
- Length: 5.0 km (3.1 mi)

Basin features
- Progression: Ruhr→ Rhine→ North Sea

Wannebach is a stream of North Rhine-Westphalia, Germany. The spring of the Wannebach is in Bürenbruch, a part of Ergste, which is a district of Schwerte. It is a left tributary of the Ruhr.

== See also ==
- List of rivers of North Rhine-Westphalia
