= Wannenbach =

River in Germany

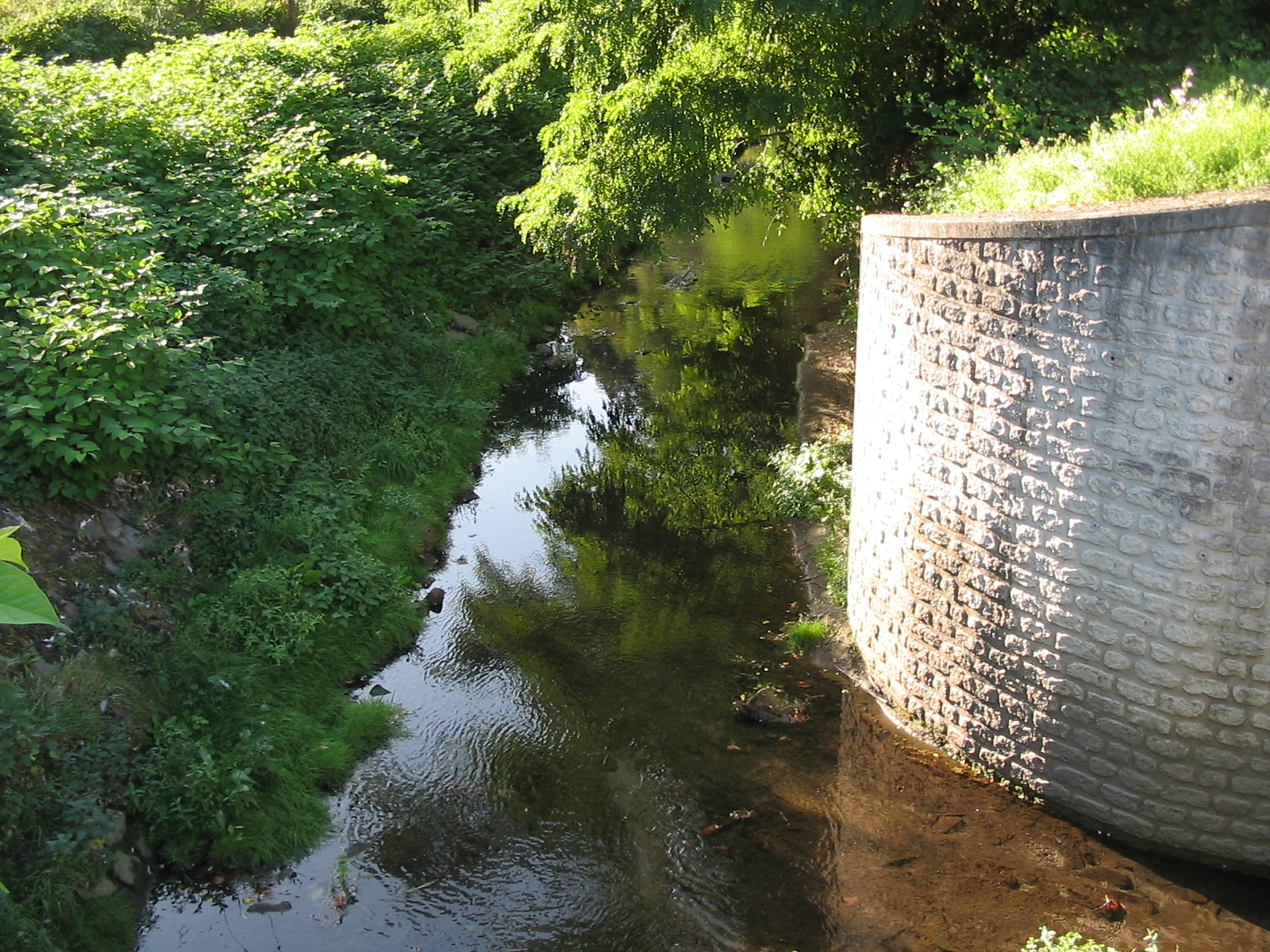

Location
- Country: Germany
- State: North Rhine-Westphalia

Physical characteristics
- Mouth
  - location: Ruhr
  - coordinates: 51°25′59″N 7°18′19″E

Basin features
- Progression: Ruhr→ Rhine→ North Sea

Wannenbach (also: Pferdebach) is a small river of North Rhine-Westphalia, Germany. It flows into the Ruhr near Witten.

== See also ==
- List of rivers of North Rhine-Westphalia
