= Kelbke =

River in Germany

Location
- Country: Germany
- States: North Rhine-Westphalia

Physical characteristics
- Mouth
  - location: Ruhr
  - coordinates: 51.3471°N 8.2094°E

Basin features
- Progression: Ruhr→ Rhine→ North Sea

Kelbke is a small river of North Rhine-Westphalia, Germany. It is 7.5 km long and flows into the Ruhr as a left tributary near Meschede.

== See also ==
- List of rivers of North Rhine-Westphalia
