= Rinderbach (Ruhr) =

River in Germany

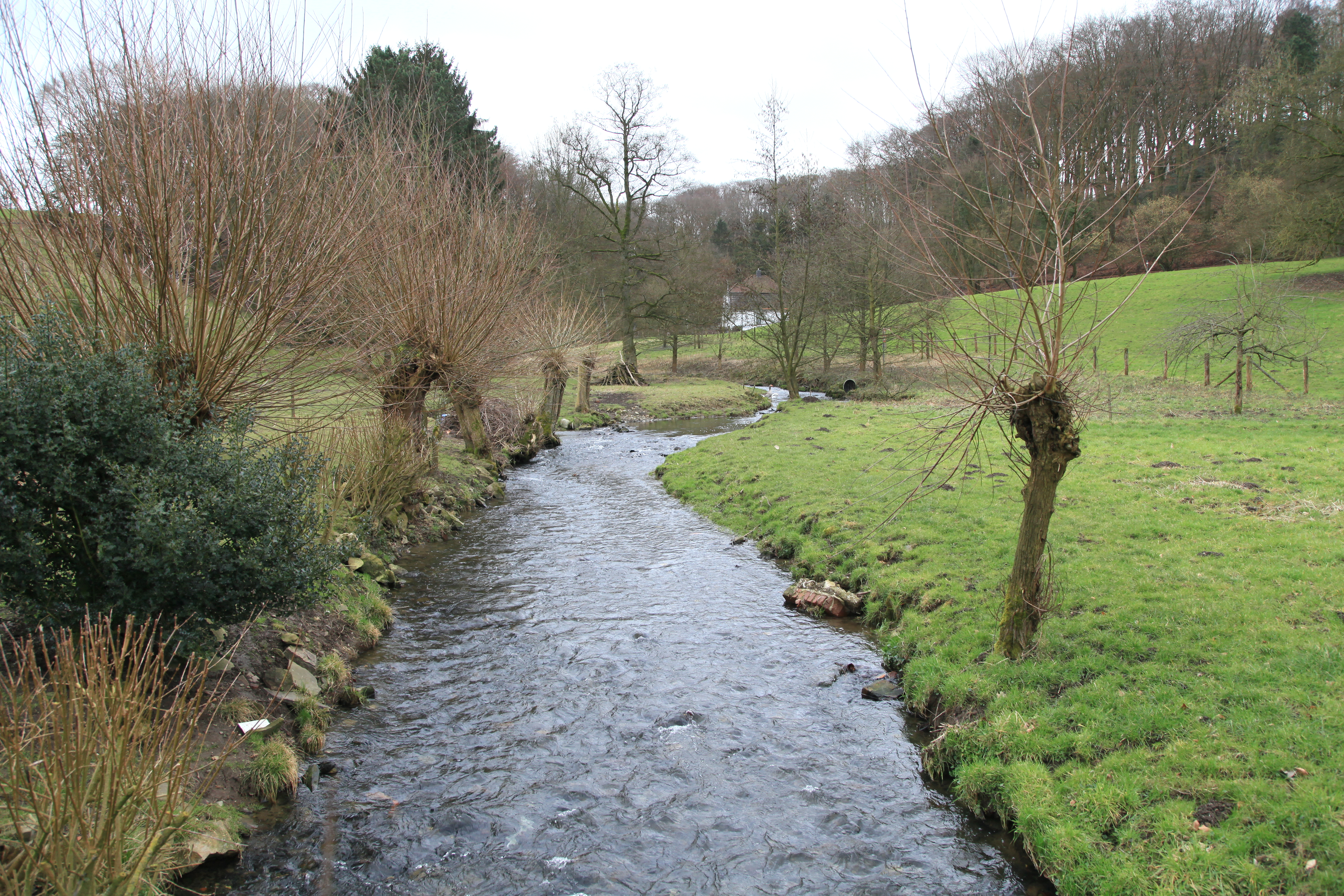

Location
- Country: Germany
- State: North Rhine-Westphalia

Physical characteristics
- Source
  - location: Velbert
  - elevation: 238 metres (781 ft)
- Mouth
  - location: Ruhr
  - coordinates: 51°21′43″N 6°56′04″E
  - elevation: 37 metres (121 ft)
- Length: 11.7 km (7.3 mi)
- Basin size: 20.346 km^{2} (7.856 sq mi)

Basin features
- Progression: Ruhr→ Rhine→ North Sea

The Rinderbach is a river of North Rhine-Westphalia, Germany, flowing into the Ruhr at Kettwig.

== See also ==
- List of rivers of North Rhine-Westphalia
