= Wannebach (Lenne) =

River in Germany

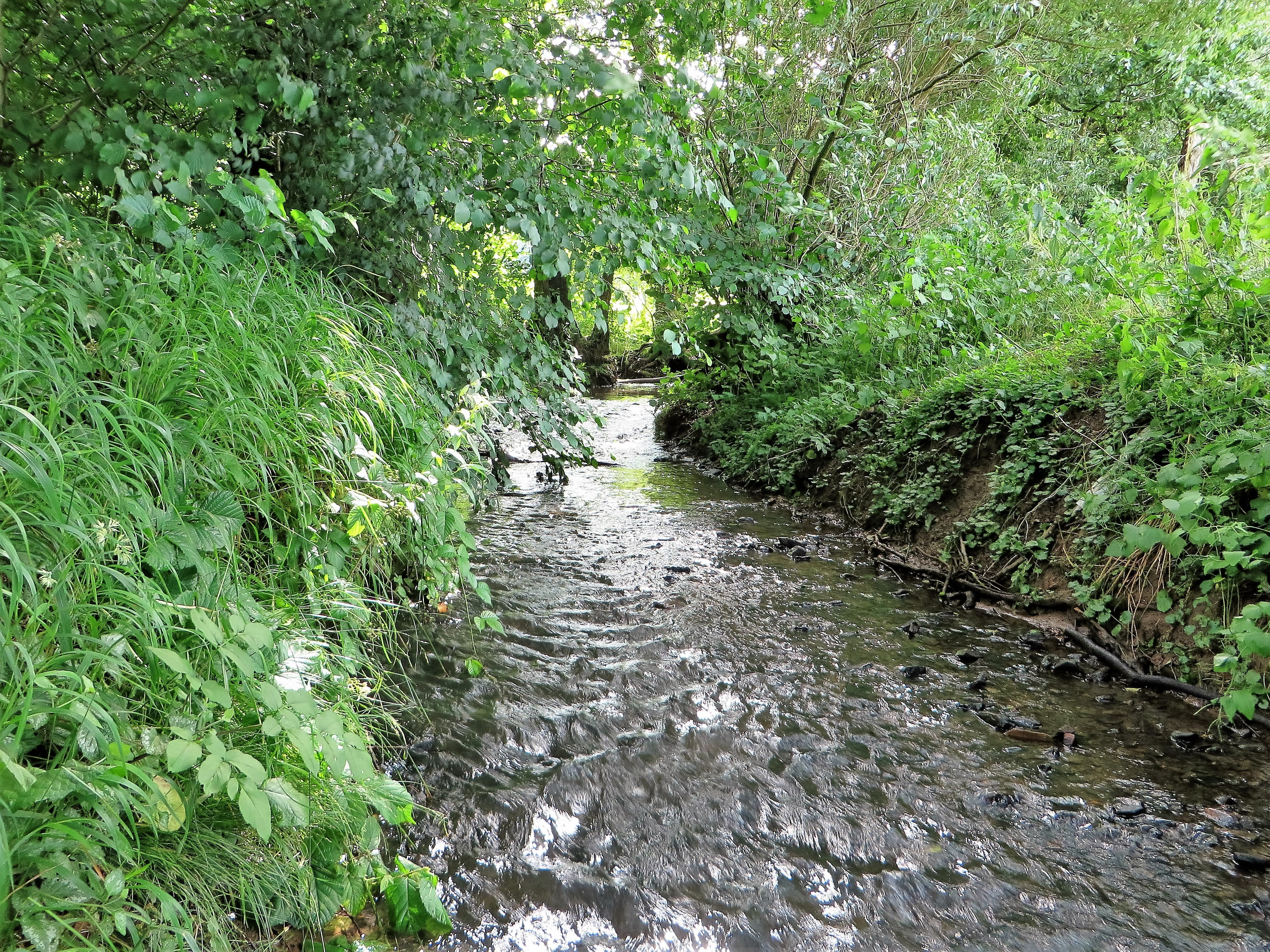
- The Wannebach in the district Berchum of Hagen

Location
- Country: Germany
- State: North Rhine-Westphalia

Physical characteristics
- Source
  - location: northeast of Stübbeken, district of Iserlohn
  - coordinates: 51.3830°N 7.5890°E
- Mouth
  - location: near Hagen into the Lenne
  - coordinates: 51.3788°N 7.5338°E

Basin features
- Progression: Lenne→ Ruhr→ Rhine→ North Sea

Wannebach is a river of North Rhine-Westphalia, Germany.

It springs northeast of Stübbeken, a district of Iserlohn. It is a right tributary of the Lenne near Hagen.

== See also ==
- List of rivers of North Rhine-Westphalia
