= Bernhard Balkenhol =

German politician (1914–2004)

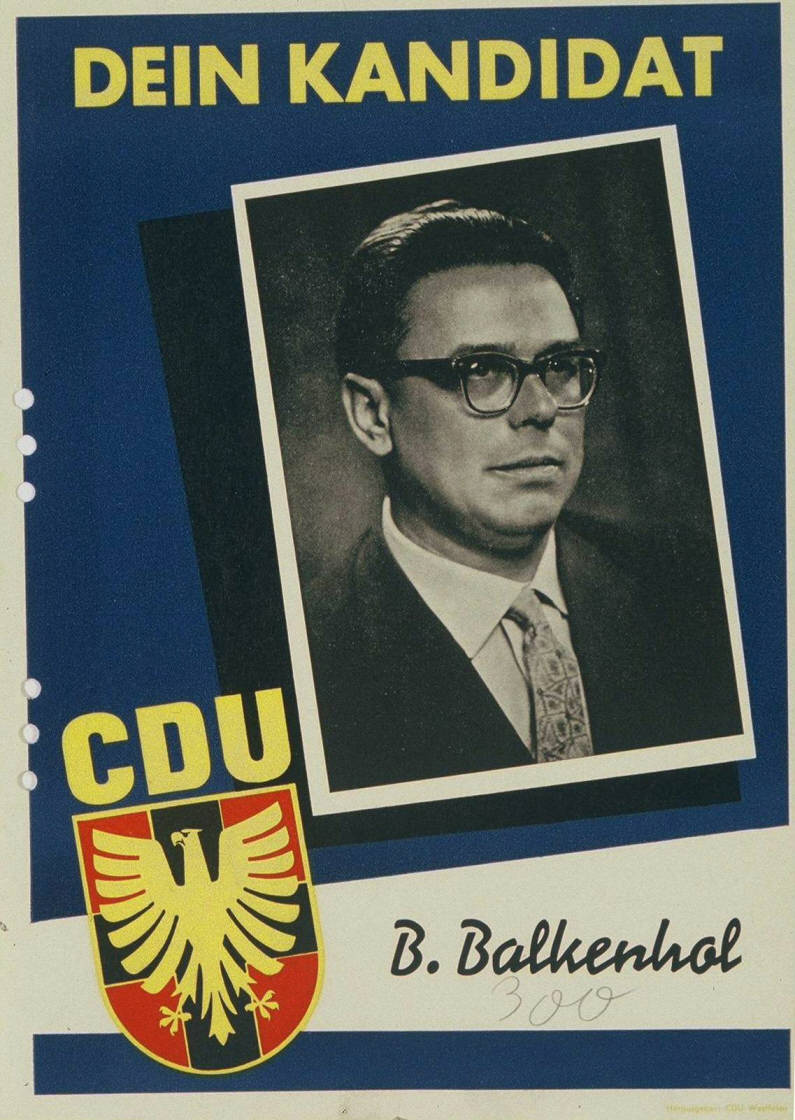
- Candidate poster Bernhard Balkenhols for the 1957 Bundestag elections

Member of the Bundestag
- In office 15 October 1957 – 22 September 1972

Personal details
- Born: 16 November 1914 Elpe
- Died: 9 November 2004 (aged 89) Elpe, North Rhine-Westphalia, Germany
- Party: CDU

Bernhard Balkenhol (November 16, 1914 – November 9, 2004) was a German politician of the Christian Democratic Union (CDU) and former member of the German Bundestag.

== Life ==
Balkenhol was a member of the CDU. Since the 1950s, he had been a member of the CDU district executive in what was then Brilon County, serving as district chairman from 1969 to 1975. From 1975 to 1977 he was deputy district chairman in the Hochsauerlandkreis. For a long time he was also the managing chairman of the CDU local politics association in Brilon county.

Balkenhol was a member of the German Bundestag from 1957 to 1972. He represented the constituency of Lippstadt - Brilon in parliament.

From 1965 to 1975, Balkenhol was a member of the Brilon County Council and then of the Hochsauerland County Council until 1985, where he also served as parliamentary party leader for a time.

From 1946 to 1960 and from 1964 to 1969, Balkenhol was Mayor of Elpe and from 1952 to 1969 he was also Mayor of Bigge and Chairman of Brilon County Council.

== Literature ==
Herbst, Ludolf; Jahn, Bruno (2002). Vierhaus, Rudolf (ed.). Biographisches Handbuch der Mitglieder des Deutschen Bundestages. 1949–2002 [Biographical Handbook of the Members of the German Bundestag. 1949–2002] (in German). München: De Gruyter - De Gruyter Saur. p. 1715. ISBN 978-3-11-184511-1.
