= Elsebach =

River in Germany

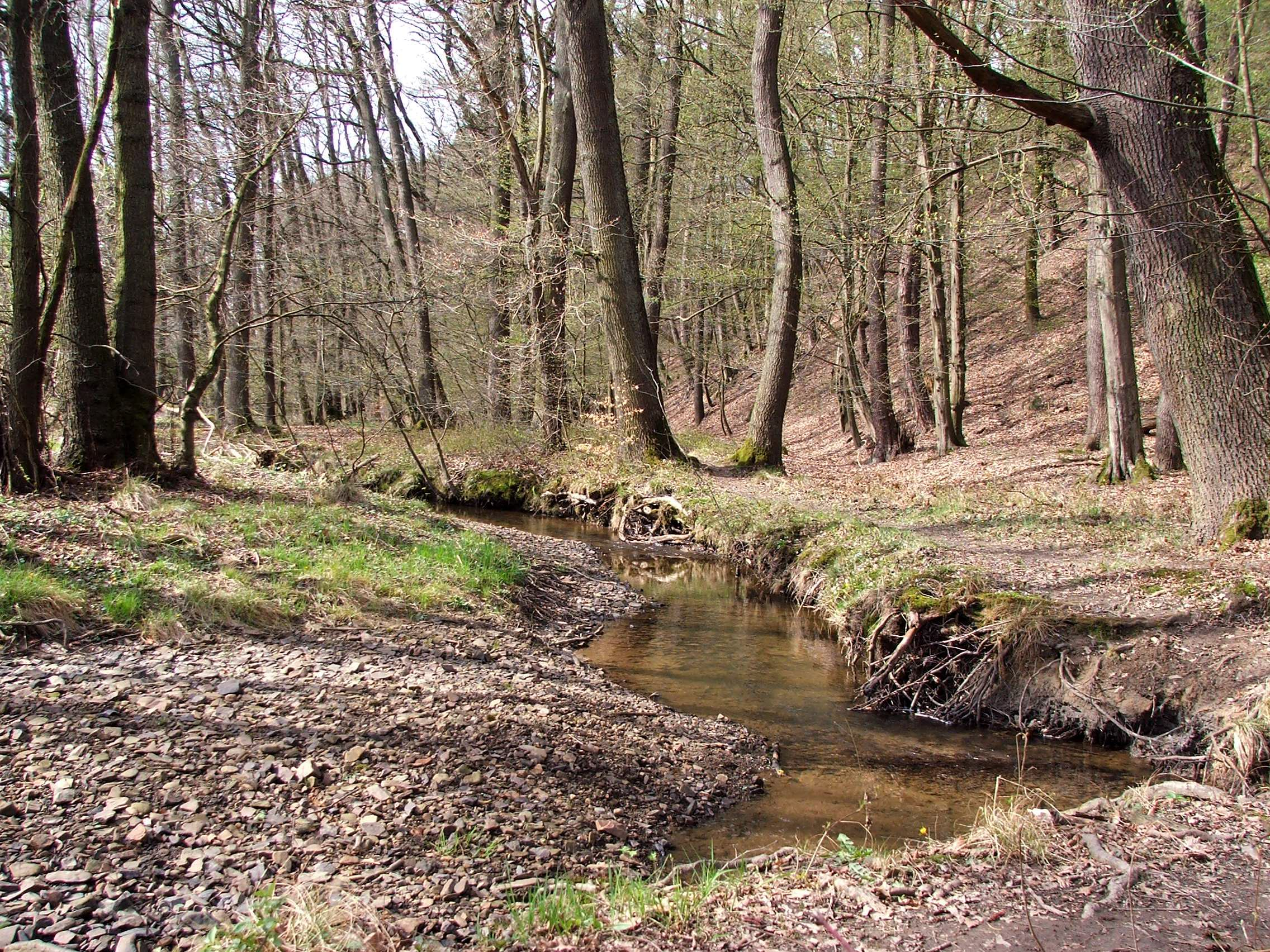
- Elsebach

Location
- Country: Germany
- State: North Rhine-Westphalia

Physical characteristics
- Mouth
  - location: Ruhr
  - coordinates: 51.4267°N 7.5608°E
- Length: 10.3 km (6.4 mi)

Basin features
- Progression: Ruhr→ Rhine→ North Sea

Elsebach (in its upper course, upstream from the Lollenbach, also: Reingser Bach) is a small river of North Rhine-Westphalia, Germany. Its source is north of Oestrich (a district of Iserlohn). Near Reingsen, it is joined by its left tributary Lollenbach. It empties into the Ruhr near Schwerte.

The open air bath "Elsebad" is named after the creek which was used in the past to provide water for the bath.

== See also ==
- List of rivers of North Rhine-Westphalia
