= Borbach (Ruhr) =

River in North Rhine-Westphalia, Germany

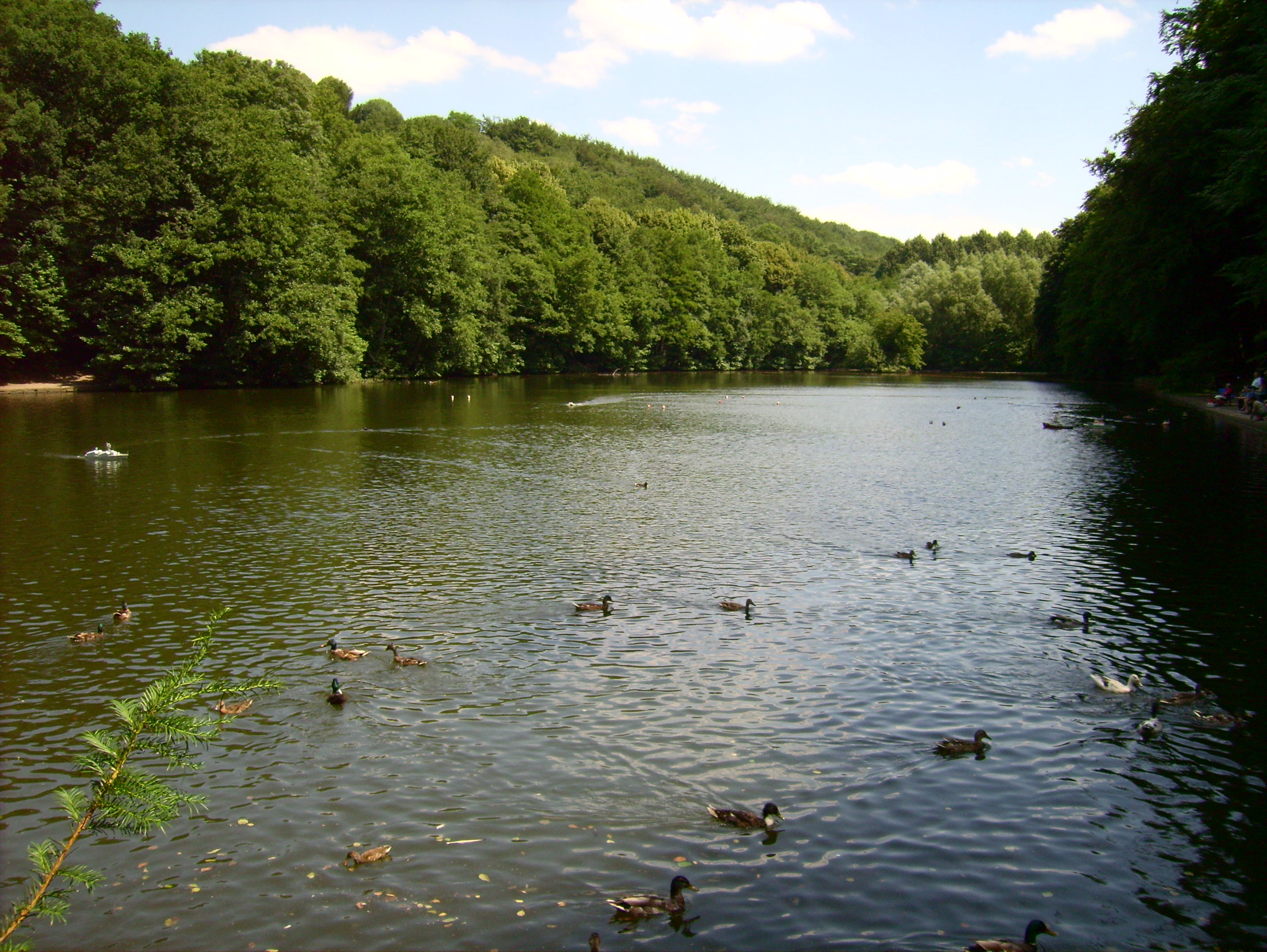

Location
- Country: Germany
- State: North Rhine-Westphalia

Physical characteristics
- Mouth
  - location: Ruhr
  - coordinates: 51.4275°N 7.3458°E

Basin features
- Progression: Ruhr→ Rhine→ North Sea

Borbach is a small river in Witten, North Rhine-Westphalia, Germany. It is a tributary of the Ruhr.

The stream begins in the local area near Schnee and travels through Witten before entering the Ruhr.

Flows Through: The city of Witten.

== See also ==
- List of rivers of North Rhine-Westphalia
