= Baarbach =

River in Germany

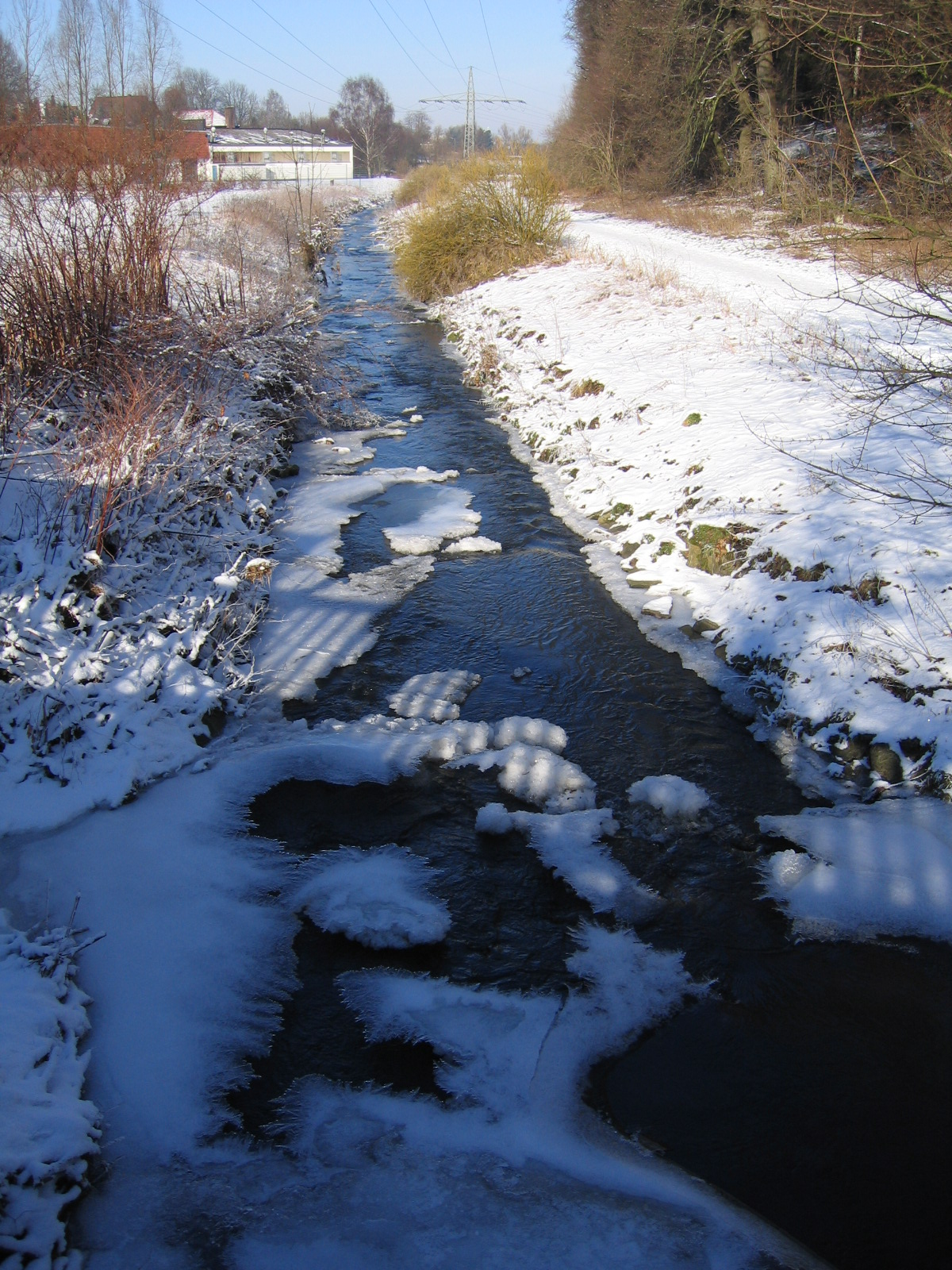

Location
- Country: Germany
- State: North Rhine-Westphalia

Physical characteristics
- Mouth
  - location: Ruhr
  - coordinates: 51.4581°N 7.6508°E
- Length: 17.5 km (10.9 mi)

Basin features
- Progression: Ruhr→ Rhine→ North Sea

Baarbach is a river of North Rhine-Westphalia, Germany, a left tributary of the Ruhr.

== See also ==
- List of rivers of North Rhine-Westphalia
