= Wanne (Möhne) =

River in Germany

Location
- Country: Germany
- State: North Rhine-Westphalia

Physical characteristics
- Mouth
  - location: Möhne
  - coordinates: 51.4806°N 8.2226°E

Basin features
- Progression: Möhne→ Ruhr→ Rhine→ North Sea

Wanne is a small river of North Rhine-Westphalia, Germany. It is 3.8 km (2.4 mi) long and is a left tributary of the Möhne.

== See also ==
- List of rivers of North Rhine-Westphalia
