= Gierskoppbach =

River in Germany

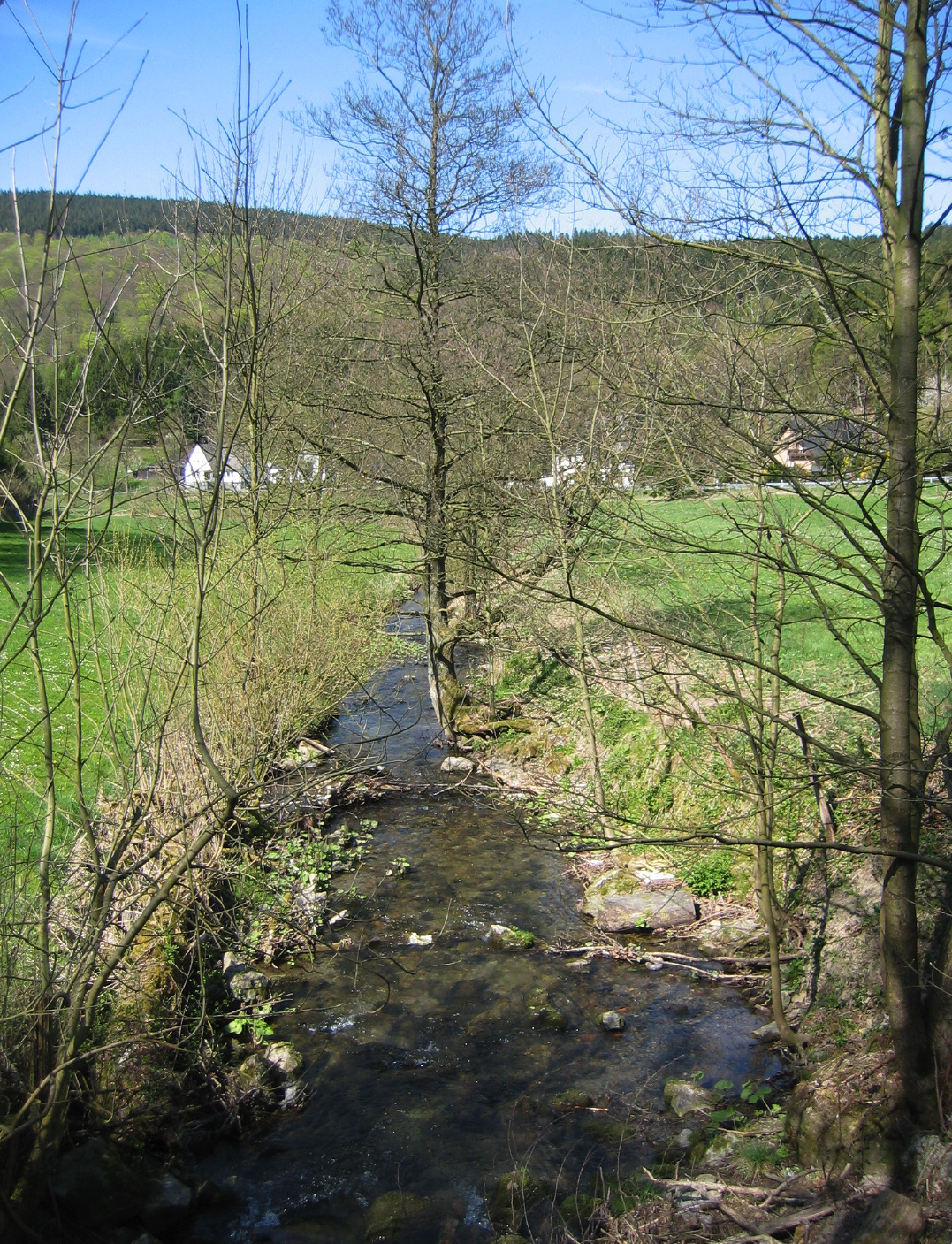

Location
- Country: Germany
- State: North Rhine-Westphalia

Physical characteristics
- Mouth
  - location: Ruhr
  - coordinates: 51.3546°N 8.4861°E
- Length: 11.9 km (7.4 mi)

Basin features
- Progression: Ruhr→ Rhine→ North Sea

Gierskoppbach is a river of North Rhine-Westphalia, Germany. It flows into the Ruhr in Olsberg.

== See also ==
- List of rivers of North Rhine-Westphalia
