= Rumbach (Ruhr) =

River in Germany

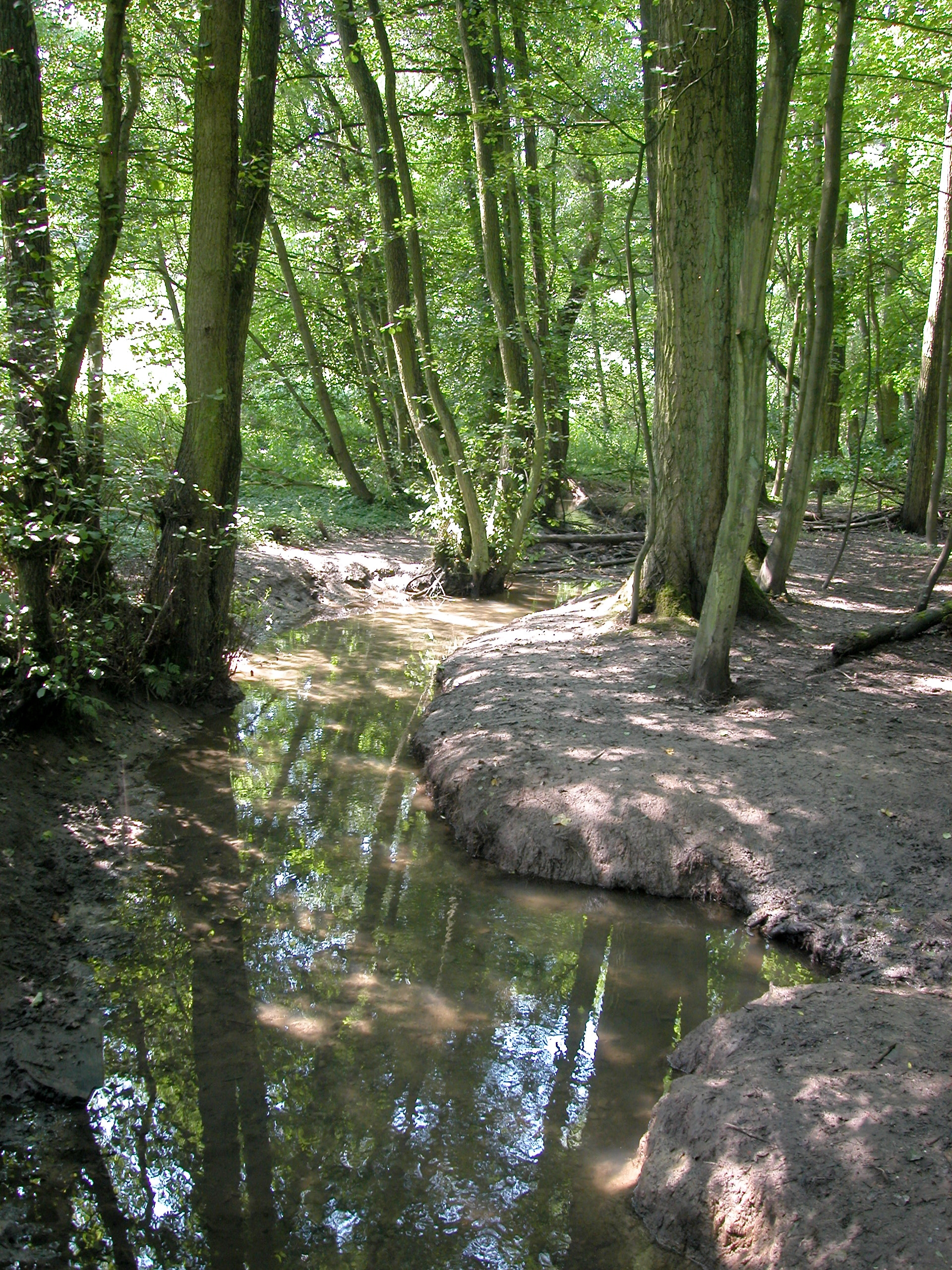

Location
- Country: Germany
- States: North Rhine-Westphalia

Physical characteristics
- Mouth
  - location: Ruhr
  - coordinates: 51.4280°N 6.8769°E

Basin features
- Progression: Ruhr→ Rhine→ North Sea

The Rumbach or Ruhmbach is a river of North Rhine-Westphalia, Germany. It is 7.4 km (4.6 mi) long and is a right tributary of the Ruhr in Mülheim.

== See also ==
- List of rivers of North Rhine-Westphalia
