= Sprockhöveler Bach =

River in Germany

Location
- Country: Germany
- State: North Rhine-Westphalia

Physical characteristics
- Mouth
  - location: Ruhr
  - coordinates: 51.4089°N 7.1794°E

Basin features
- Progression: Ruhr→ Rhine→ North Sea

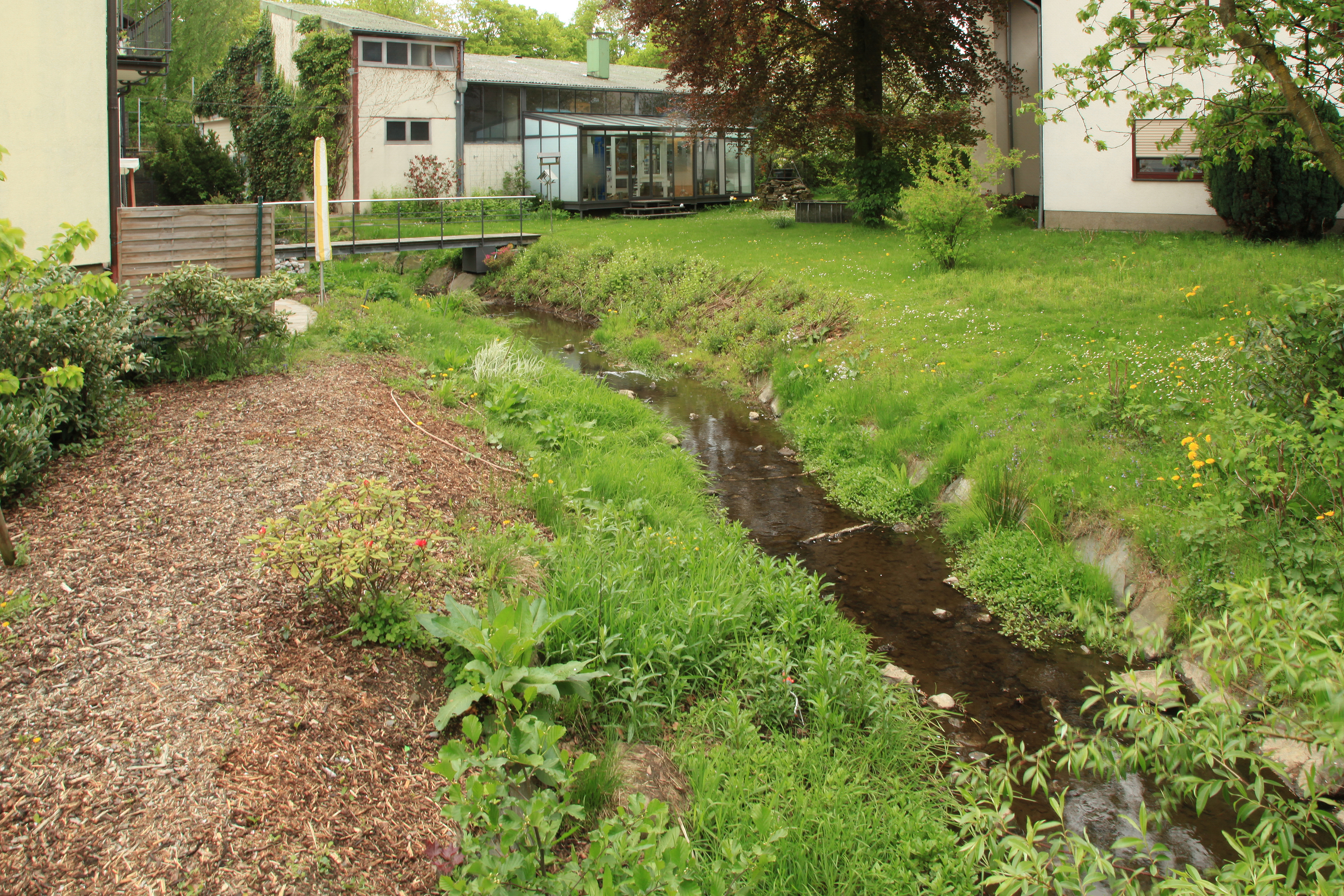
Sprockhöveler Bach am Kirchweg in Sprockhövel

Sprockhöveler Bach is a river of North Rhine-Westphalia, Germany. It flows into the Ruhr in Hattingen.

== See also ==
- List of rivers of North Rhine-Westphalia
