= Abbabach =

River in Germany

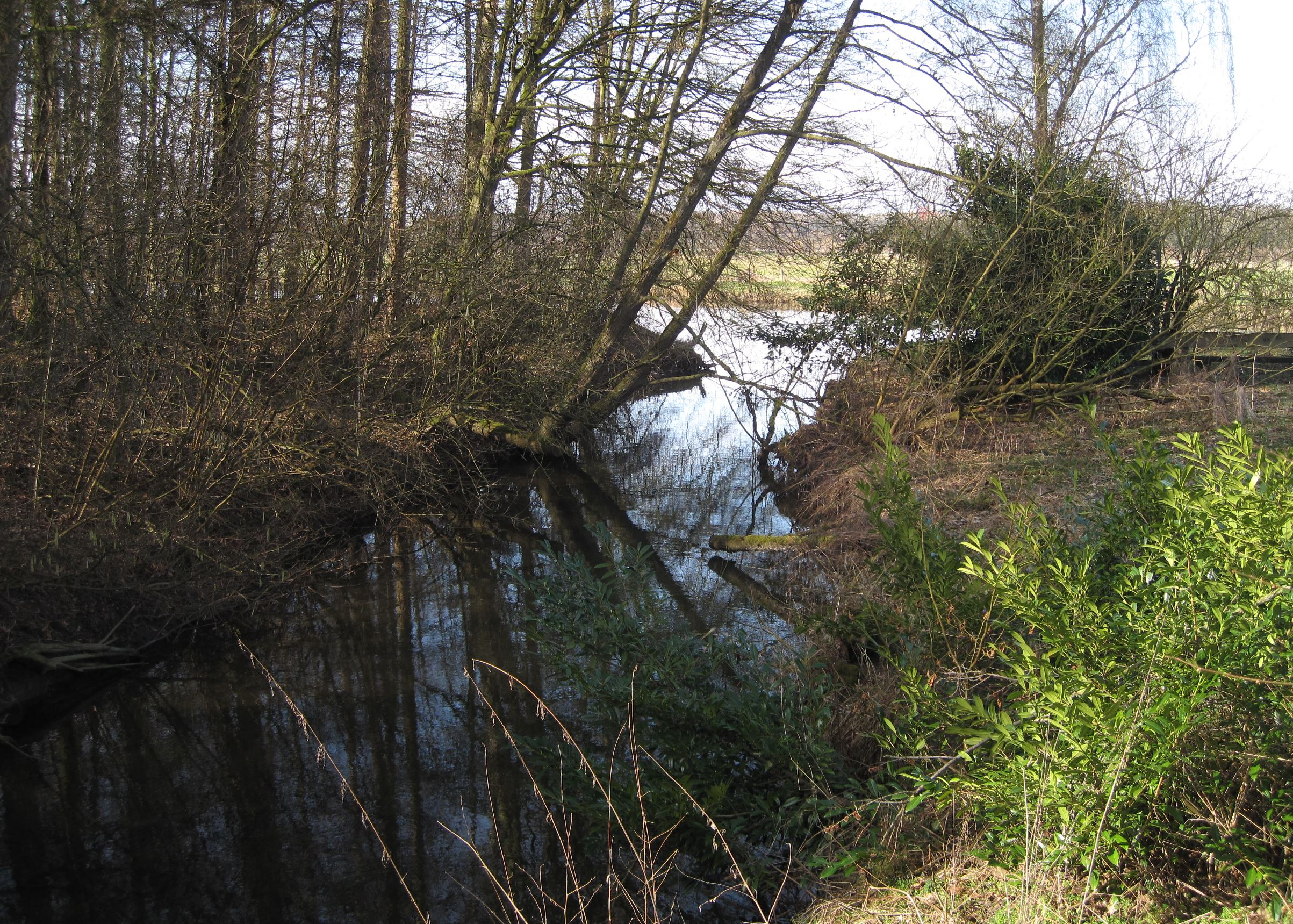

Location
- Country: Germany
- State: North Rhine-Westphalia

Physical characteristics
- Mouth
  - location: Ruhr
  - coordinates: 51°28′9″N 7°40′55″E
- Length: 17.1 km (10.6 mi)

Basin features
- Progression: Ruhr→ Rhine→ North Sea

Abbabach is a river in North Rhine-Westphalia, Germany, and a tributary of the Ruhr.

== See also ==
- List of rivers of North Rhine-Westphalia
