= Mühlenbach (Ruhr) =

River in North Rhine-Westphalia, Germany

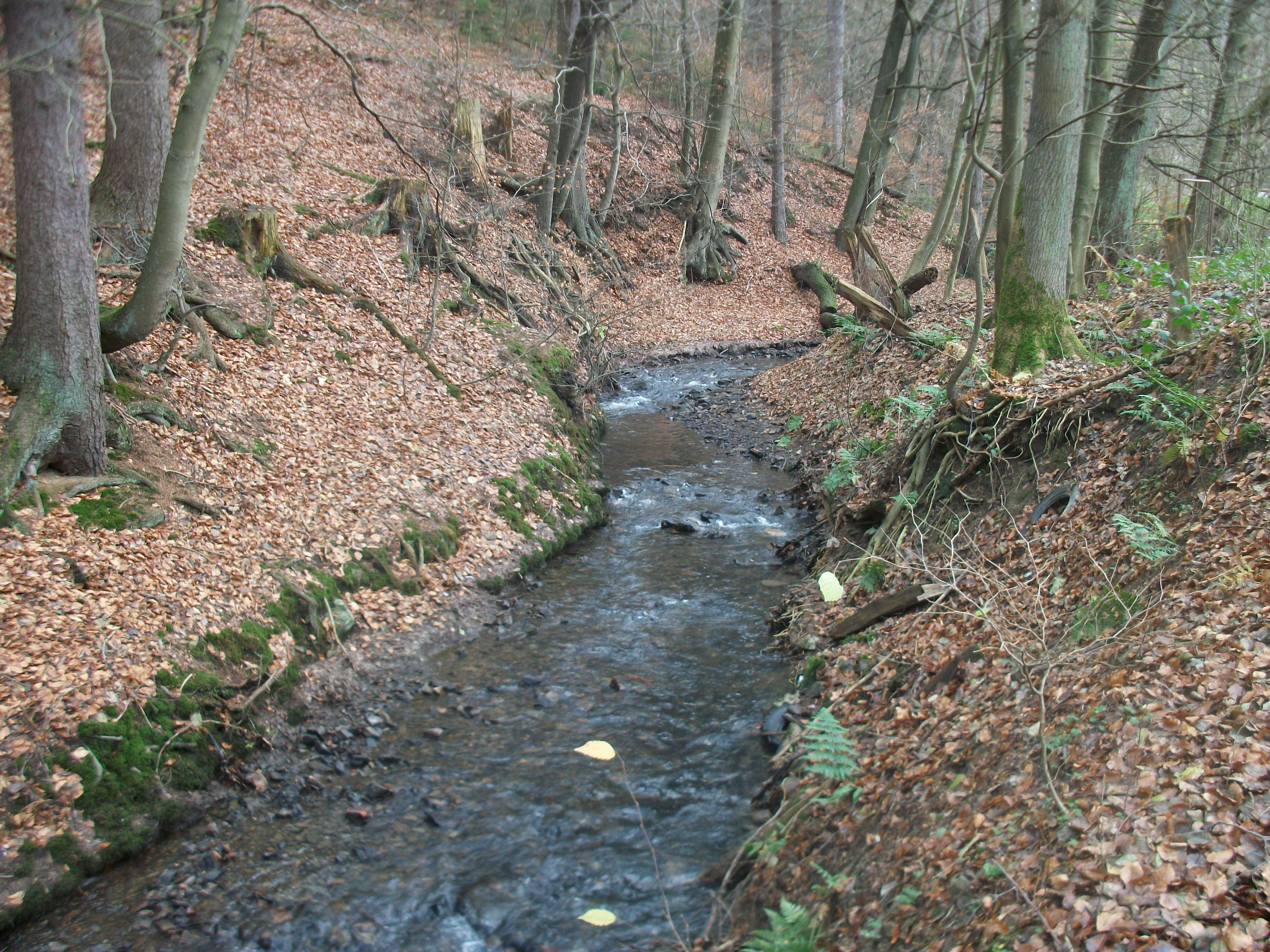

Location
- Country: Germany
- State: North Rhine-Westphalia

Physical characteristics
- Mouth
  - location: Ruhr
  - coordinates: 51.3966°N 8.1077°E
- Length: 4.8 km (3.0 mi)

Basin features
- Progression: Ruhr→ Rhine→ North Sea

Mühlenbach (German pronunciation: [ˈmyːlənbax]) is a small river of North Rhine-Westphalia, Germany. It is a left tributary of the Ruhr near Arnsberg.

== See also ==
- List of rivers of North Rhine-Westphalia
