= Oefter Bach =

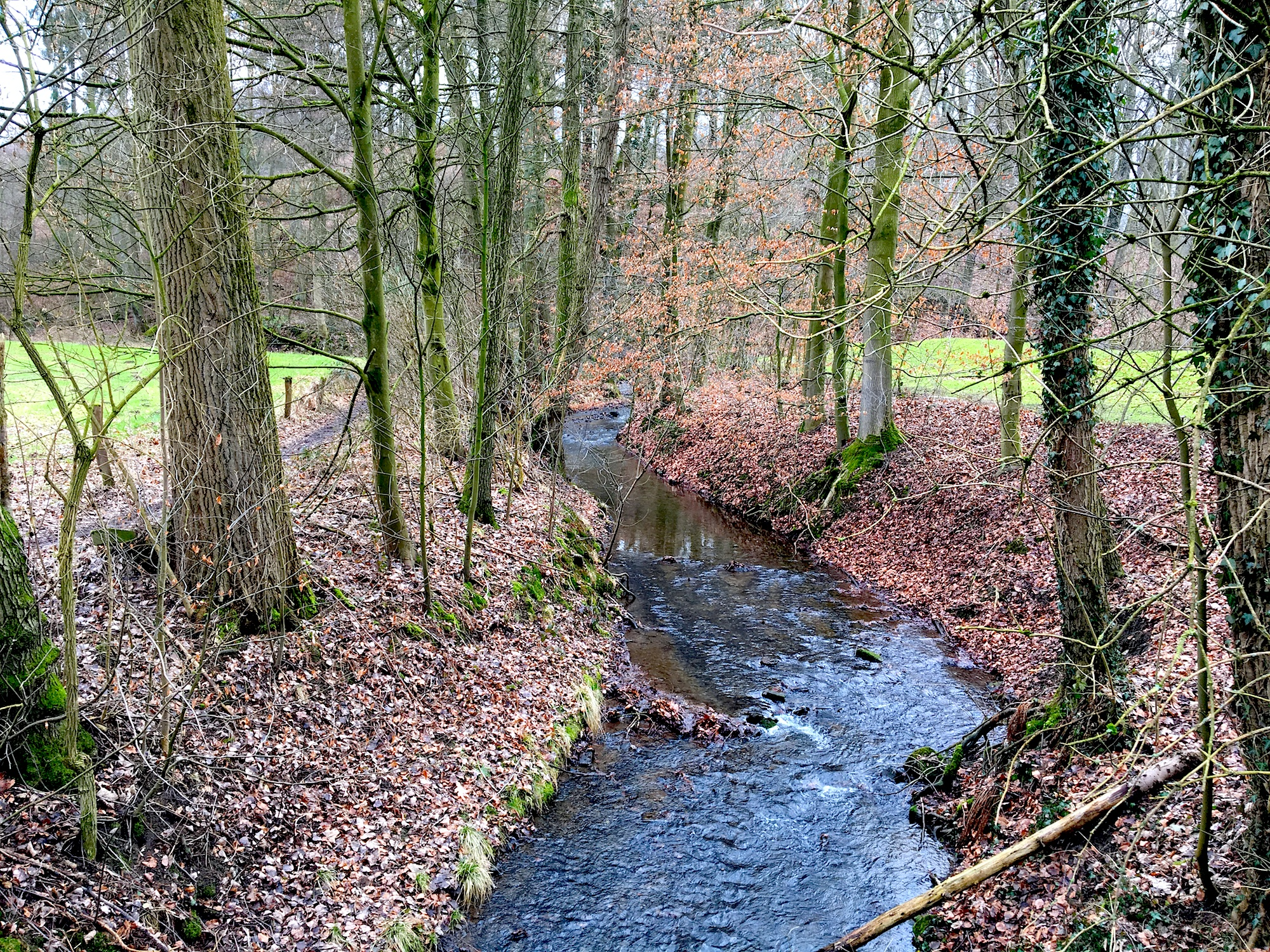

Location
- Country: Germany
- States: North Rhine-Westphalia

Physical characteristics
- Mouth
  - location: Ruhr
  - coordinates: 51.3659°N 6.9606°E

Basin features
- Progression: Ruhr→ Rhine→ North Sea

Oefter Bach is a small river of North Rhine-Westphalia, Germany. It is 4.8 km (3.0 mi) long and flows as a left tributary into the Ruhr in Kettwig.

== See also ==
- List of rivers of North Rhine-Westphalia
