= Bachumer Bach =

River of North Rhine-Westphalia, Germany

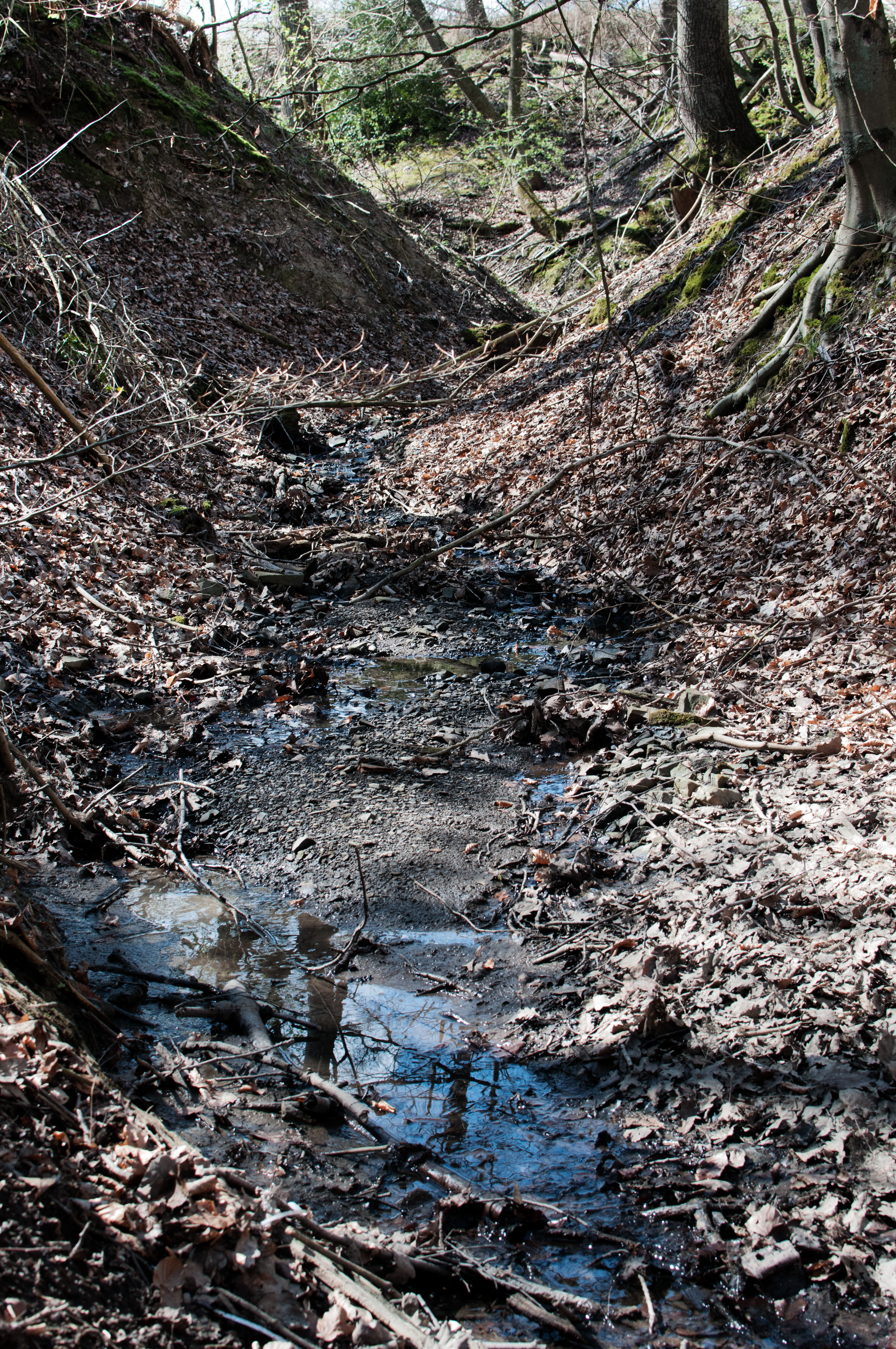

Location
- Country: Germany
- State: North Rhine-Westphalia
- City: Dreihausen

Physical characteristics
- Source: North of Dreihausen in Bachum
  - location: Germany
  - coordinates: 51°27′2″N 7°55′45″E
  - elevation: 238 m (781 ft)
- Mouth: Border between Bachum and Neheim
  - coordinates: 51°28′10″N 7°56′42″E
  - elevation: 149 m (489 ft)
- Length: 2.938 km (1.826 mi)

Basin features
- Progression: Ruhr→ Rhine→ North Sea

Bachumer Bach is a small (2.94 km long) stream in North Rhine-Westphalia, Germany. The stream rises north of the town of Dreihausen (belonging to Bachum) at an altitude of 238 meters above sea level and flows in a northerly direction to 149 meters above sea level then flows into the Ruhr near Neheim.

== See also ==
- List of rivers of North Rhine-Westphalia
