= Nierbach =

River in Germany

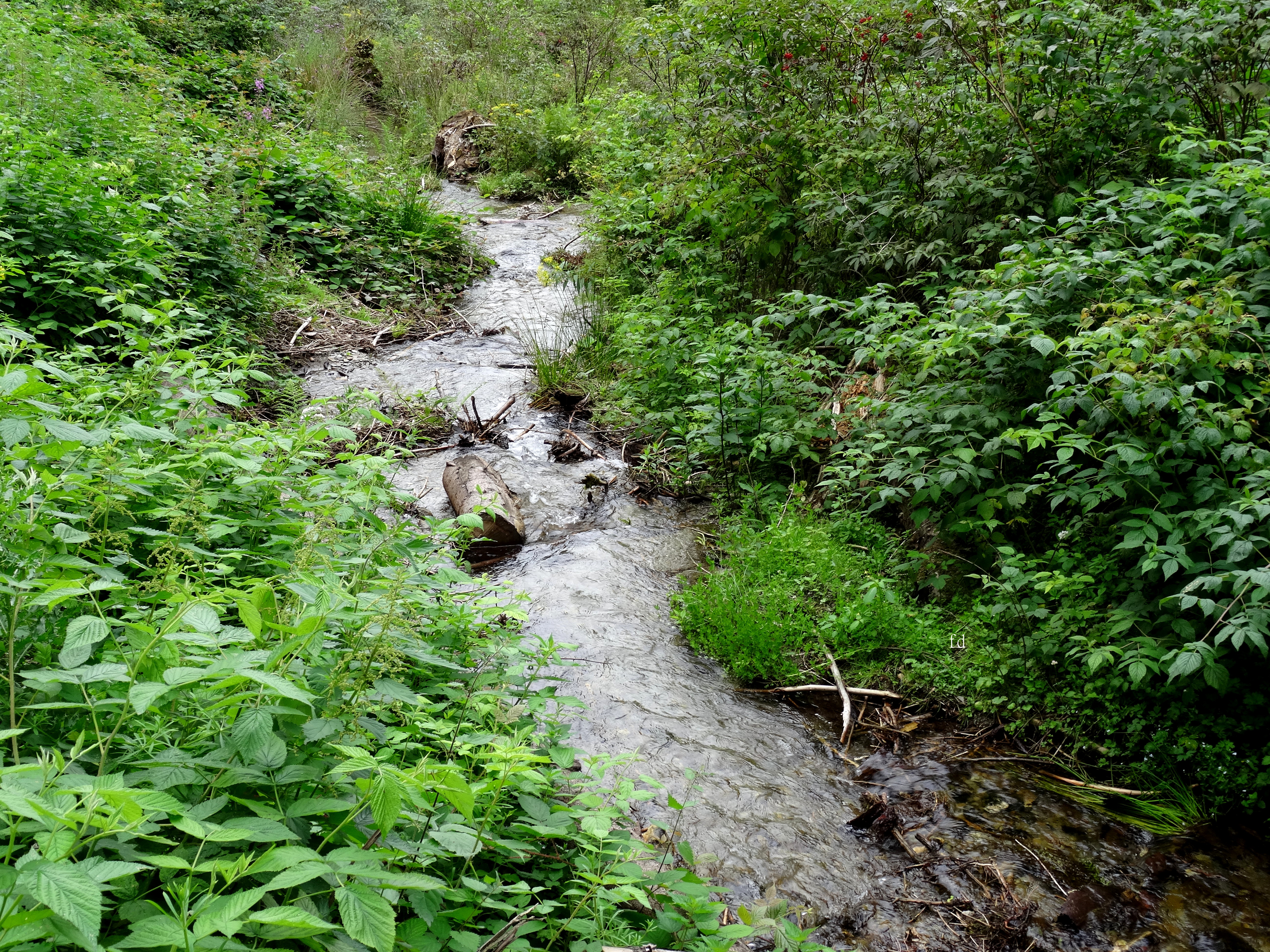

Location
- Country: Germany
- State: North Rhine-Westphalia

Physical characteristics
- Mouth
  - location: Ruhr
  - coordinates: 51.3519°N 8.3381°E
- Length: 10.1 km (6.3 mi)

Basin features
- Progression: Ruhr→ Rhine→ North Sea

Nierbach (in its upper course also: Neismecke) is a river of North Rhine-Westphalia, Germany. It flows into the Ruhr in Wehrstapel.

== See also ==
- List of rivers of North Rhine-Westphalia
