= Knöselsbach =

River in Germany

Location
- Country: Germany
- States: North Rhine-Westphalia

Physical characteristics
- Mouth
  - location: Ruhr
  - coordinates: 51.4174°N 7.2089°E

Basin features
- Progression: Ruhr→ Rhine→ North Sea

Knöselsbach is a small river of North Rhine-Westphalia, Germany. It is 2.4 km long and flows into the Ruhr as a right tributary in Hattingen-Welper.

== See also ==
- List of rivers of North Rhine-Westphalia
