= Voßmecke =

River in Germany

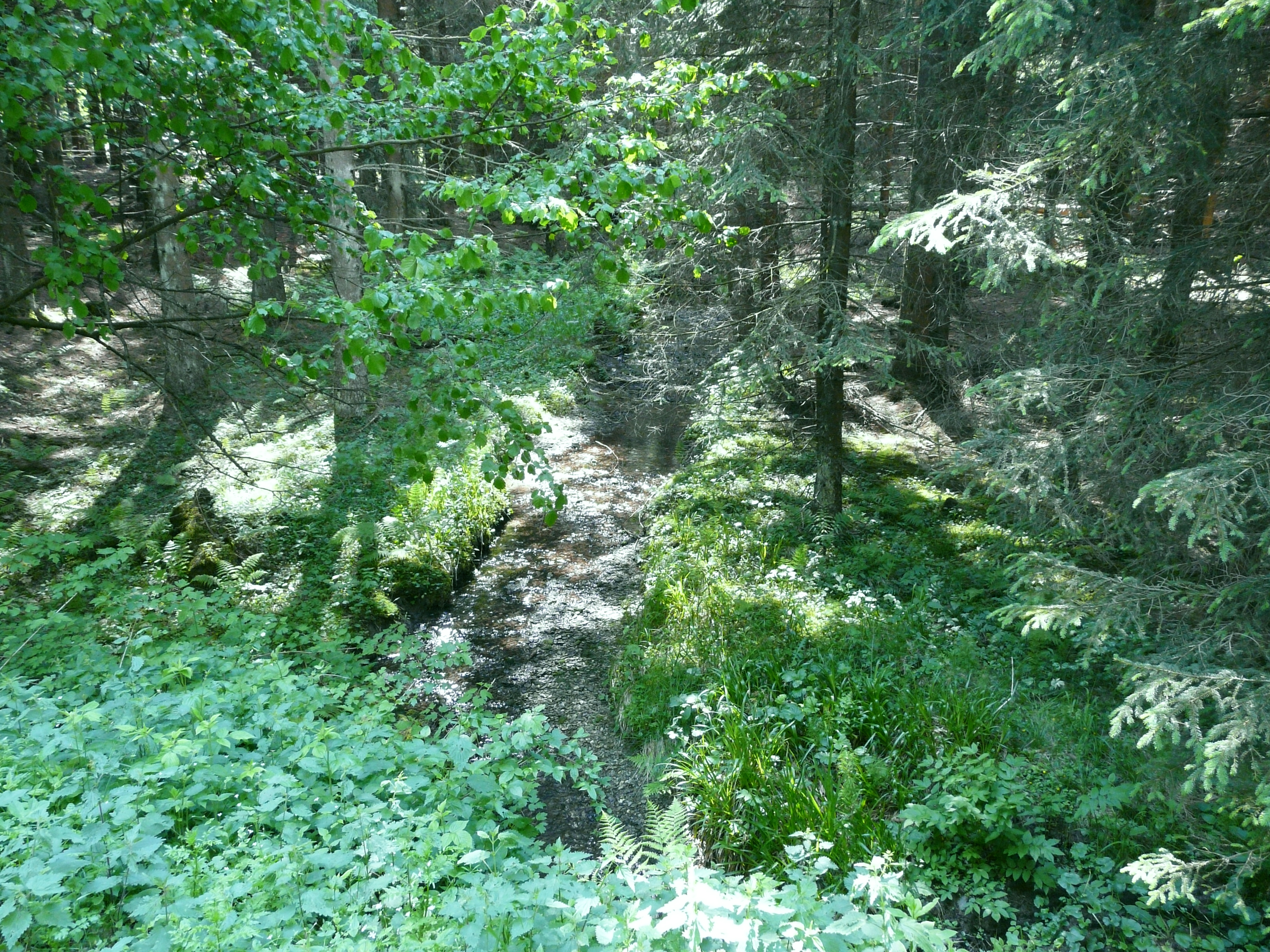

Location
- Country: Germany
- State: North Rhine-Westphalia

Physical characteristics
- Mouth
  - location: Ruhr
  - coordinates: 51.2398°N 8.5266°E

Basin features
- Progression: Ruhr→ Rhine→ North Sea

Voßmecke is a small river of North Rhine-Westphalia, Germany. It is 2.8 km (1.7 mi) long and flows as a left tributary into the Ruhr near Winterberg.

== See also ==
- List of rivers of North Rhine-Westphalia
