= Haßbach (Ruhr) =

River in Germany

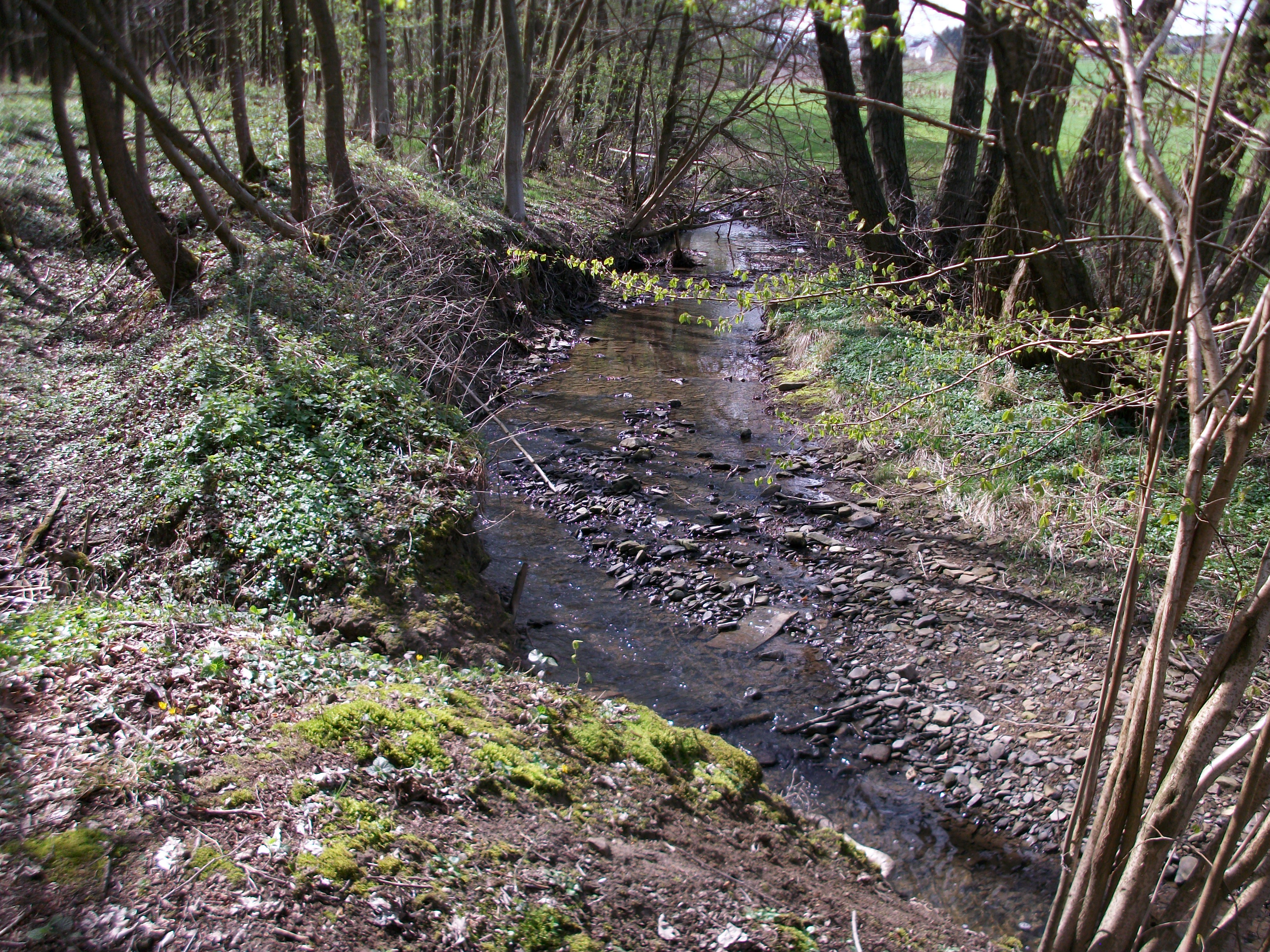

Location
- Country: Germany
- States: North Rhine-Westphalia

Physical characteristics
- Mouth
  - location: Ruhr
  - coordinates: 51.4718°N 7.9272°E

Basin features
- Progression: Ruhr→ Rhine→ North Sea

Haßbach is a small river of North Rhine-Westphalia, Germany. It is 6.3 km long and flows into the Ruhr near Neheim.

== See also ==
- List of rivers of North Rhine-Westphalia
