= Ansgar Schledde =

German politician (born 1977)

Member of the Landtag of Lower Saxony
- Incumbent
- Assumed office 8 November 2022

Personal details
- Born: 13 September 1977 (age 48) Wickede
- Party: Alternative for Germany

Ansgar Georg Schledde (born 13 September 1977 in Wickede) is a German politician serving as a member of the Landtag of Lower Saxony since 2022. He has served as chairman of the Alternative for Germany in Lower Saxony since 2024.
