= Hillebach =

River in Northrhine-Westphalia, Germany

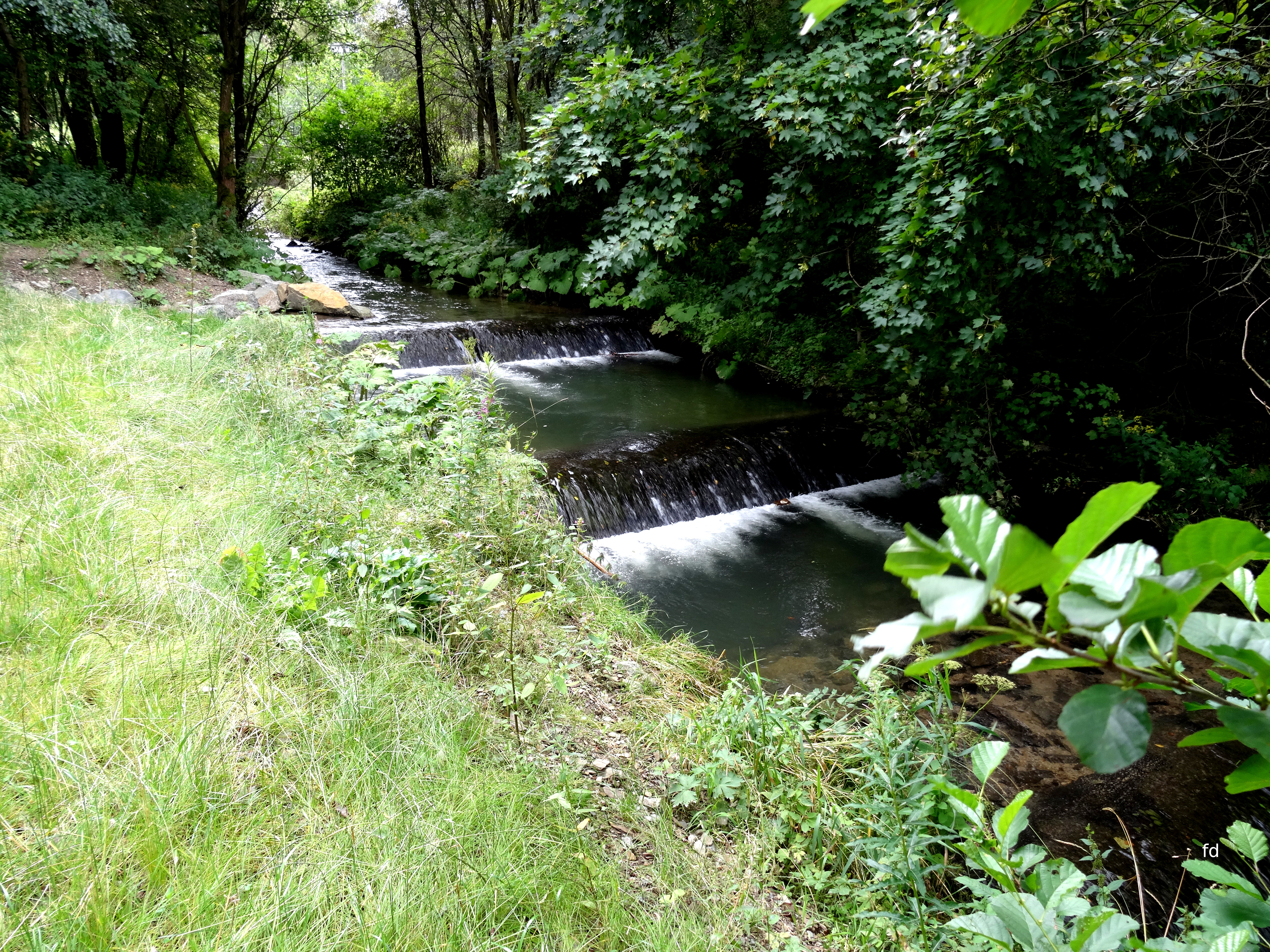

Location
- Country: Germany
- States: North Rhine-Westphalia

Physical characteristics
- Mouth
  - location: Ruhr
  - coordinates: 51°15′36″N 8°31′41″E

Basin features
- Progression: Ruhr→ Rhine→ North Sea

Hillebach is a small river of North Rhine-Westphalia, Germany. It is 7.7 km long and flows into the Ruhr near Winterberg.

== Course ==
The river begins in Natural Park Sauerland Rothaar, flowing in a predominantly north-west direction. Then it flows through Hillekopf welding Micke - Hildfeld, a northern district of Winterberg, near the southern outskirts. Southwest of the village opens Grone Springebach, which comes from the south towards the town of Grönenbach. Then the stream passes the 837-meter-tall (2,746 ft) Mount Clemens, the highest mountain along the cup-shaped river valley, located on the lower part of its western flank cottages.

It flows through the Hillebachstausee lying below the Rimberg (764.5 m) Hillestausee at Niedersfeld, a northern district of Winterberg, a few hundred meters downstream - west of the village hall (Schützenhalle). At about 519 m altitude a tributary arrives from the south Rhein-Ruhr.

== See also ==
- List of rivers of North Rhine-Westphalia
