= Gebke (Wennemen) =

River in Germany

Location
- Country: Germany
- State: North Rhine-Westphalia

Physical characteristics
- Mouth
  - location: Ruhr
  - coordinates: 51.3463°N 8.2048°E
- Length: 7.4 km (4.6 mi)

Basin features
- Progression: Ruhr→ Rhine→ North Sea

Gebke is a river of North Rhine-Westphalia, Germany. It is right tributary of the Ruhr in Wennemen, district of Meschede.

== See also ==
- List of rivers of North Rhine-Westphalia
