= Wimberbach =

River in Germany

Location
- Country: Germany
- State: North Rhine-Westphalia

Physical characteristics
- Mouth
  - location: Ruhr
  - coordinates: 51.4869°N 7.8608°E

Basin features
- Progression: Ruhr→ Rhine→ North Sea

Wimberbach (in its lower course: Mühlenbach) is a small river of North Rhine-Westphalia, Germany. It is 8.4 km (5.2 mi) long and flows into the Ruhr as a left tributary in Wickede.

== See also ==
- List of rivers of North Rhine-Westphalia
