= Wanne (Ruhr) =

River in Germany

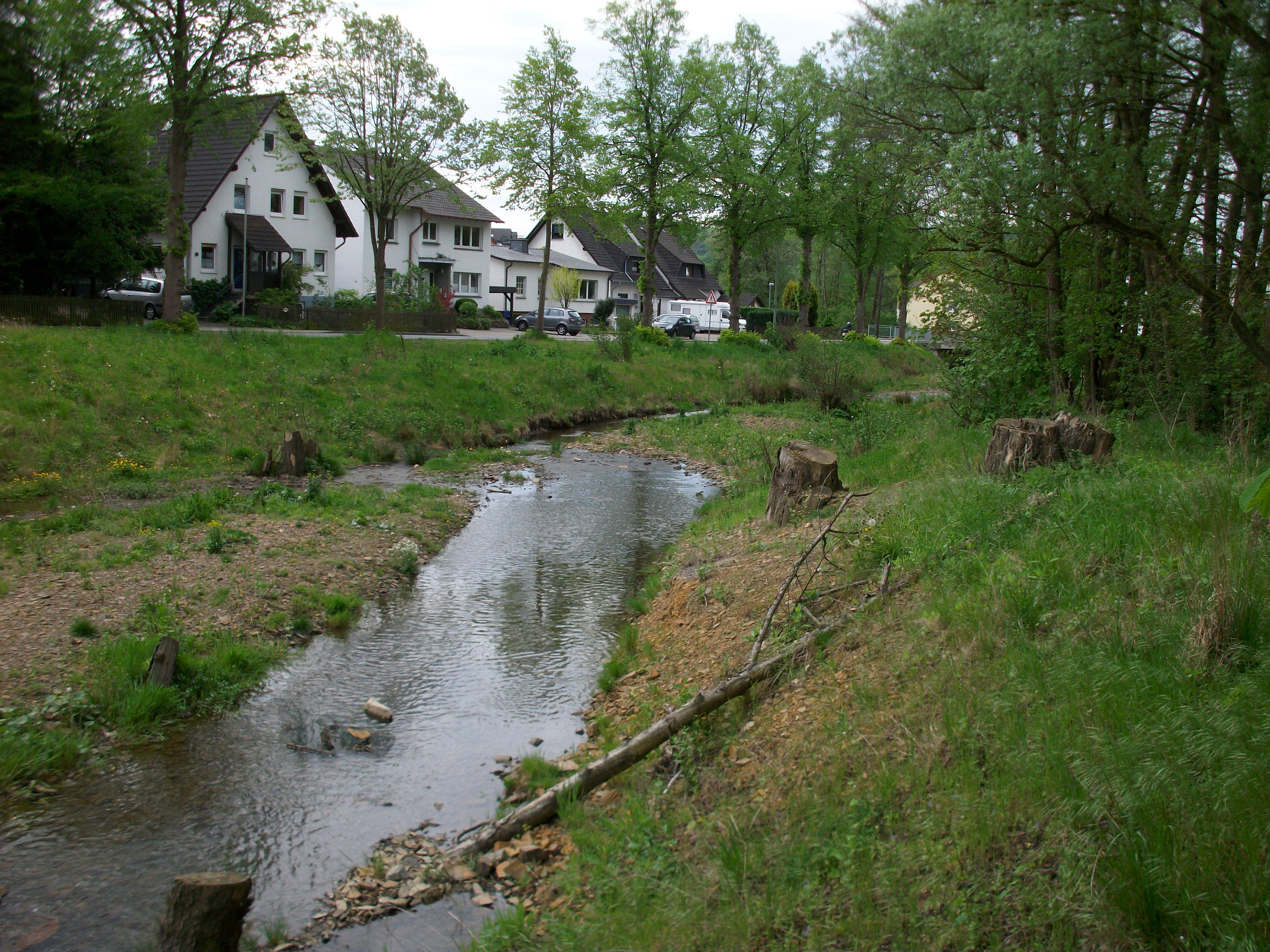
- Wanne in Arnsberg-Niedereimer

Location
- Country: Germany
- State: North Rhine-Westphalia

Physical characteristics
- Mouth
  - location: Ruhr
  - coordinates: 51.4160°N 8.0446°E

Basin features
- Progression: Ruhr→ Rhine→ North Sea

Wanne is a river of North Rhine-Westphalia, Germany. It is 8.8 km (5.5 mi) long and is a right tributary of the Ruhr near Arnsberg.

== See also ==
- List of rivers of North Rhine-Westphalia
