= Theo Wanne =

American saxophone manufacturer

Theo Wanne (born 1967) is an American saxophone manufacturer and saxophone mouthpiece designer.

== Biography ==
Theo Wanne was born in 1967 in California, US. From 1980 to 1986, Wanne was an apprentice of Joel Jensen of Da Da Bicycles in Bellingham, WA. He designed and hand-built custom bicycle frames, developing metal-working skills.

In 1987, he attended Macalester College for a year, where he studied music composition. He then travelled to Thailand, staying in a Buddhist monastery, and studied meditation in India. Upon his return to the US, he studied at Western Washington University, followed by California Institute of the Arts where his focus was jazz studies on the saxophone. From 1987 to 1997, Wanne bought and sold vintage musical instruments to finance his schooling. He also studied the history and repair of saxophone mouthpieces with the help of Randy Jones of Tenor Madness in Iowa, and Bob Carpenter from Seattle, WA.

In 1997, he graduated from the Naropa Institute, completing a BA in Musical Improvisation. In 1998, Wanne relocated to Philadelphia, Pennsylvania, and repaired musical instruments with master repairman Bret Gustafson of Gustafson Music. At the same time, Wanne bought and sold hundreds of his own custom mouthpieces though his Internet store, Saxophone Mouthpiece Heaven. In 2007, he began manufacturing his own line of mouthpieces alongside his brother, Tom Wanne. They incorporated as Wanne, Inc., doing business as Theo Wanne. Saxophone Mouthpiece Heaven became inactive, its database moved to his current website. In 2009, he released his first fully machined mouthpiece using aerospace CAD CAM technology. He has five patents/patents pending. In 2013, Tom Wanne left Wanne Inc. to pursue other business opportunities.

In 2012, Wanne's first tenor saxophone, the MANTRA, was released. In 2013, the MANTRA Soprano saxophone was released. In 2014, Wanne moved his company to new facilities to enable further development and innovation in mouthpiece design. A full re-design of his mouthpiece line came in at the beginning of 2015, with the introduction of the DURGA3, followed by the GAIA2, SHIVA2, AMBIKA2 in 2016.

== Saxophone Mouthpiece Heaven ==
Wanne bought and sold hundreds of his own custom mouthpieces, leading to the inception of his store, Saxophone Mouthpiece Heaven, in 1999. Saxophone Mouthpiece Heaven became the world's most comprehensive resource for information on the design and history of saxophone mouthpieces, and Wanne's mouthpiece work was becoming acclaimed around the globe.

Paul Haar, of Jazz Times Magazine said, "Wanne's web site was and is a historian's vault filled with information."

Wanne worked with many musicians here, such as Joshua Redman, Chris Potter, Eric Alexander, Jan Garbarek, and Tim Price, and quickly became known as the leading expert in his field.

Wanne's line of mouthpieces is vast, and has undergone a number of changes throughout its history. Each model falls into one of four categories: true large chamber, core sound, classic series or artist series.
