= Wickede =

Wickede (Ruhr)
- Municipality
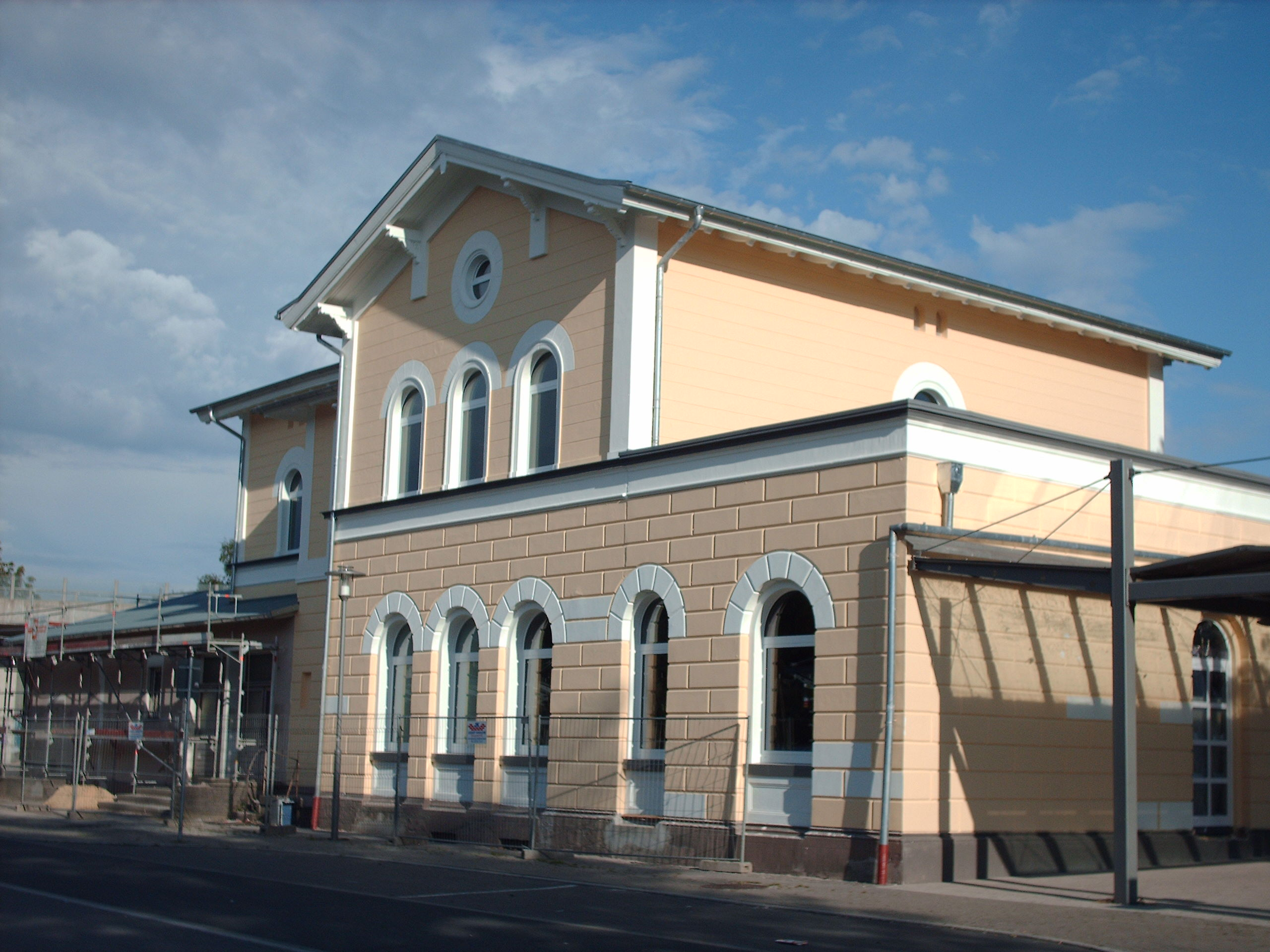
- Train station

- Coat of arms

- Location of Wickede (Ruhr) within Soest district
- Interactive map of Wickede (Ruhr)
- Location within Germany Location within North Rhine-Westphalia
- Coordinates: 51°29′47″N 07°51′57″E
- Country: Germany
- State: North Rhine-Westphalia
- Admin. region: Arnsberg
- District: Soest
- Subdivisions: 5

Government
  - Mayor (2020–25): Martin Michalzik (CDU)

Area
  - Total: 25.24 km^{2} (9.75 sq mi)
- Elevation: 140 m (460 ft)

Population (2025-12-31)
  - Total: 11,254
  - Density: 445.9/km^{2} (1,155/sq mi)
- Time zone: UTC+01:00 (CET)
  - Summer (DST): UTC+02:00 (CEST)
- Postal codes: 58739
- Dialling codes: 02377
- Vehicle registration: SO
- Website: www.wickede.de

Wickede (German pronunciation: [ˈvɪkədə]), officially Wickede (Ruhr), is a municipality in the district of Soest, in North Rhine-Westphalia, Germany. Wickede lists the town of Jemielnica in Poland as its twin city and enjoys the cultural exchange and relationship.

== Geography ==
Wickede (Ruhr) is situated on the river Ruhr which runs directly through the town and shapes the townscape. Wickede (Ruhr) is situated approximately 20 km south of Hamm and 20 km south-west of Soest. The town encompasses 25.2 square kilometers and is located on the southern flank of a hill called "Haarstrang".

=== Neighbouring municipalities ===
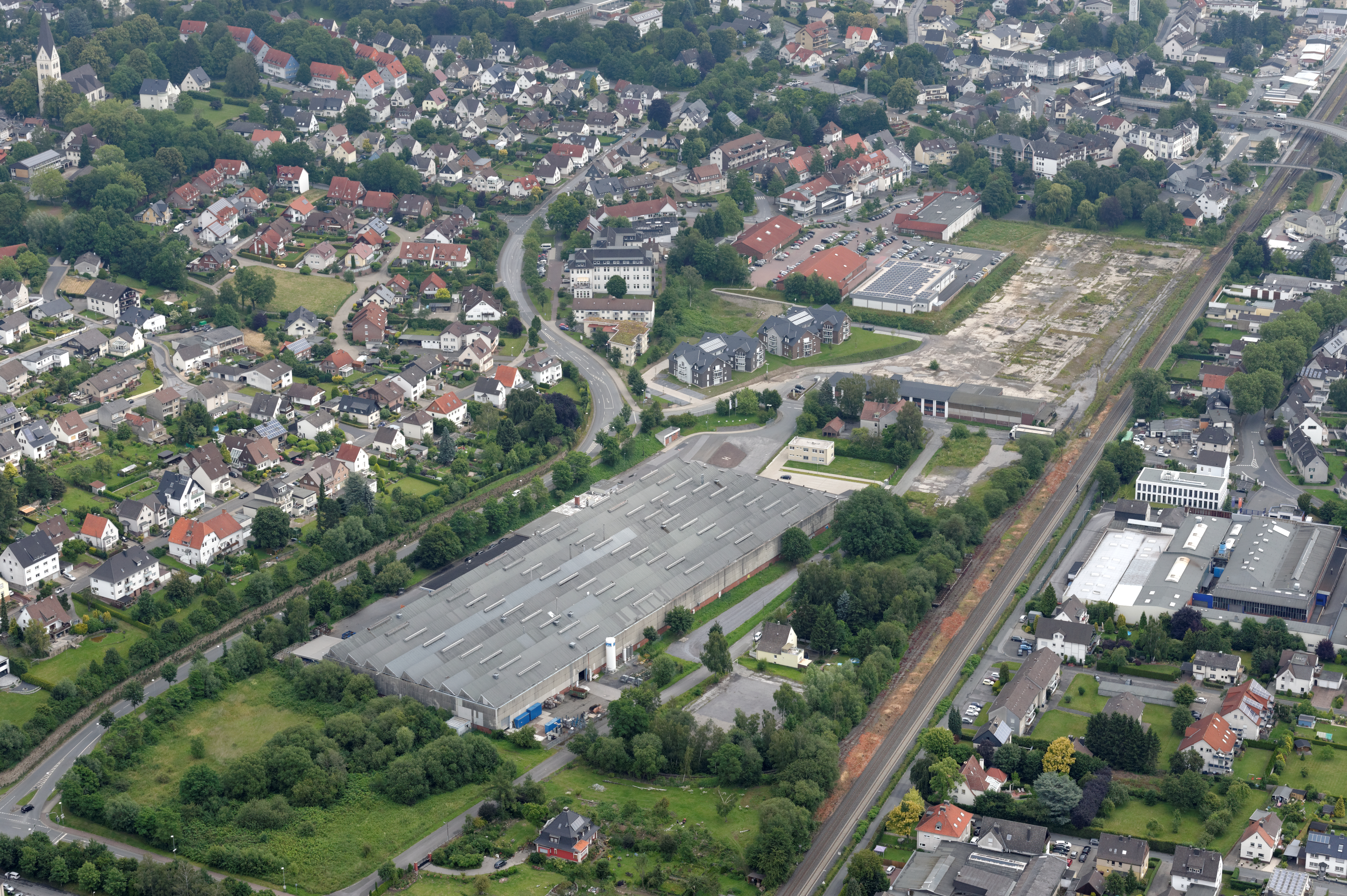
Aerial photograph of Wickede

- Arnsberg
- Ense
- Fröndenberg
- Menden
- Unna
- Werl

=== Division of the town ===
After the local government reforms of 1969, Wickede consists of the following five districts:

- Echthausen (1.622 inhabitants)
- Schlückingen (218 inhabitants)
- Wiehagen (1.452 inhabitants)
- Wimbern (1.003 inhabitants)
- Wickede (8.564 inhabitants)

== Population ==
Historical population

Year	Pop.	±% p.a.
1965	9,994	—
1970	10,993	+1.92%
1975	11,843	+1.50%
1980	11,657	−0.32%
1985	11,497	−0.28%
1990	11,829	+0.57%
1995	12,495	+1.10%

Year	Pop.	±% p.a.
2000	12,695	+0.32%
2005	12,470	−0.36%
2010	11,899	−0.93%
2015	12,745	+1.38%
2020	12,682	−0.10%
2025	11,254	−2.36%

Source: Landesdatabank Nordrhein-Westfalen

== Economy and Infrastructure ==
Wickede experienced growth primarily in the 19th century with the beginning of the industrial age and the formation of a glass hut. At the beginning of the 20th century, this was replaced by a steel factory, the most important workplace in town.

Today, high-end clinical and nursing home equipment, primarily produced by the companies "Wissner Bosserhoff" and "Schmitz u. Söhne GmbH & Co. KG" are a major component of the local economy. Additional major employers are the bike component producer "Wilhelm Humpert GmbH & Co. KG" and the chain factory "HEKO".

The town experience significant industrial growth with the foundation of the "Westerhaar" industrial zone between Wickede and the neighboring town of Werl.

As of June 2010, the town saw 4391 employed inhabitants.

== People ==
=== Notable people ===
- Fritz Steinhoff (1897-1969), German politician (SPD)
- Alfred Baum (1952-), Canoeist; participant Olympia 1972
- Ansgar Schledde (born 1977), German politician (AfD)
