= Ergste =

Coordinates: 51.418°N 7.571°E

Ergste

Ergste is a stadtbezirk (a district) of the town of Schwerte in Germany. As of 31 December 2012, Ergste had a population of 7025 inhabitants. It lies south of the river Ruhr near Sauerland. Ergste is twinned with the French commune Allouagne.

Ergste has bus connections inside the district, to central Schwerte and Iserlohn-Letmathe. Furthermore you can find an own train station here. It is served by train line RB53 between Iserlohn and Dortmund via Schwerte. On weekdays the connections on this line are half-hourly.
