= Ruhr (river) =

River in Germany

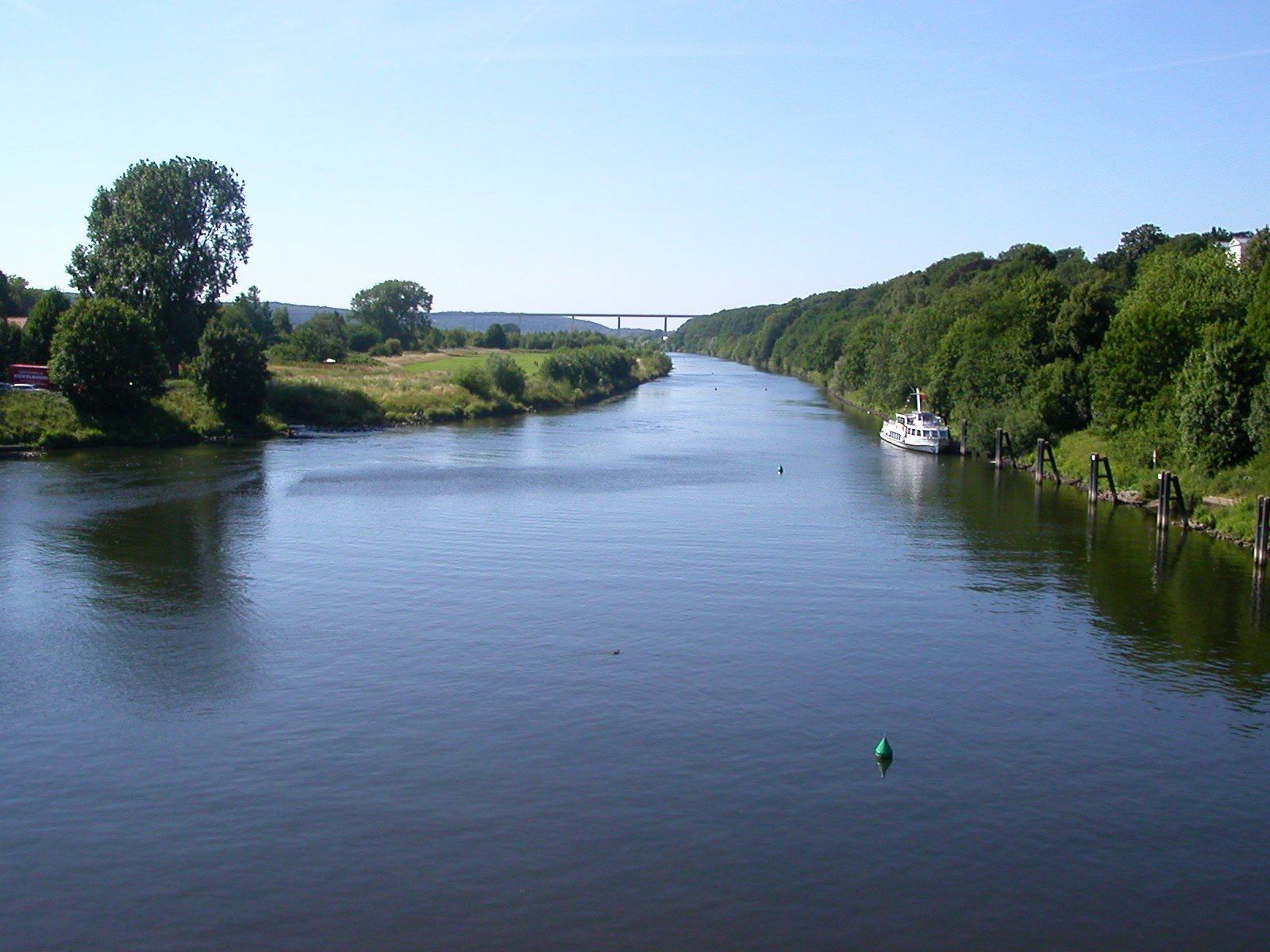
- The Ruhr in Essen-Kettwig

Location
- Country: Germany
- State: North Rhine-Westphalia

Physical characteristics
- Source
  - location: Kahler Asten
  - elevation: 870 m (2,850 ft)
- Mouth
  - location: Rhine
  - coordinates: 51°27′3″N 6°43′22″E
- Length: 219.2 km (136.2 mi)
- Basin size: 4,485 km^{2} (1,732 sq mi)
- Discharge
  - average: 79 m^{3}/s (2,800 cu ft/s)

Basin features
- Progression: Rhine→ North Sea
- Cities: Duisburg, Essen, Dortmund, Mülheim
- Tributaries
  - left: Lenne, Volme
  - right: Möhne

The Ruhr (German pronunciation: [ʁuːɐ̯]) is a river in western Germany (North Rhine-Westphalia), a right tributary (east-side) of the Rhine.

== Description and history ==
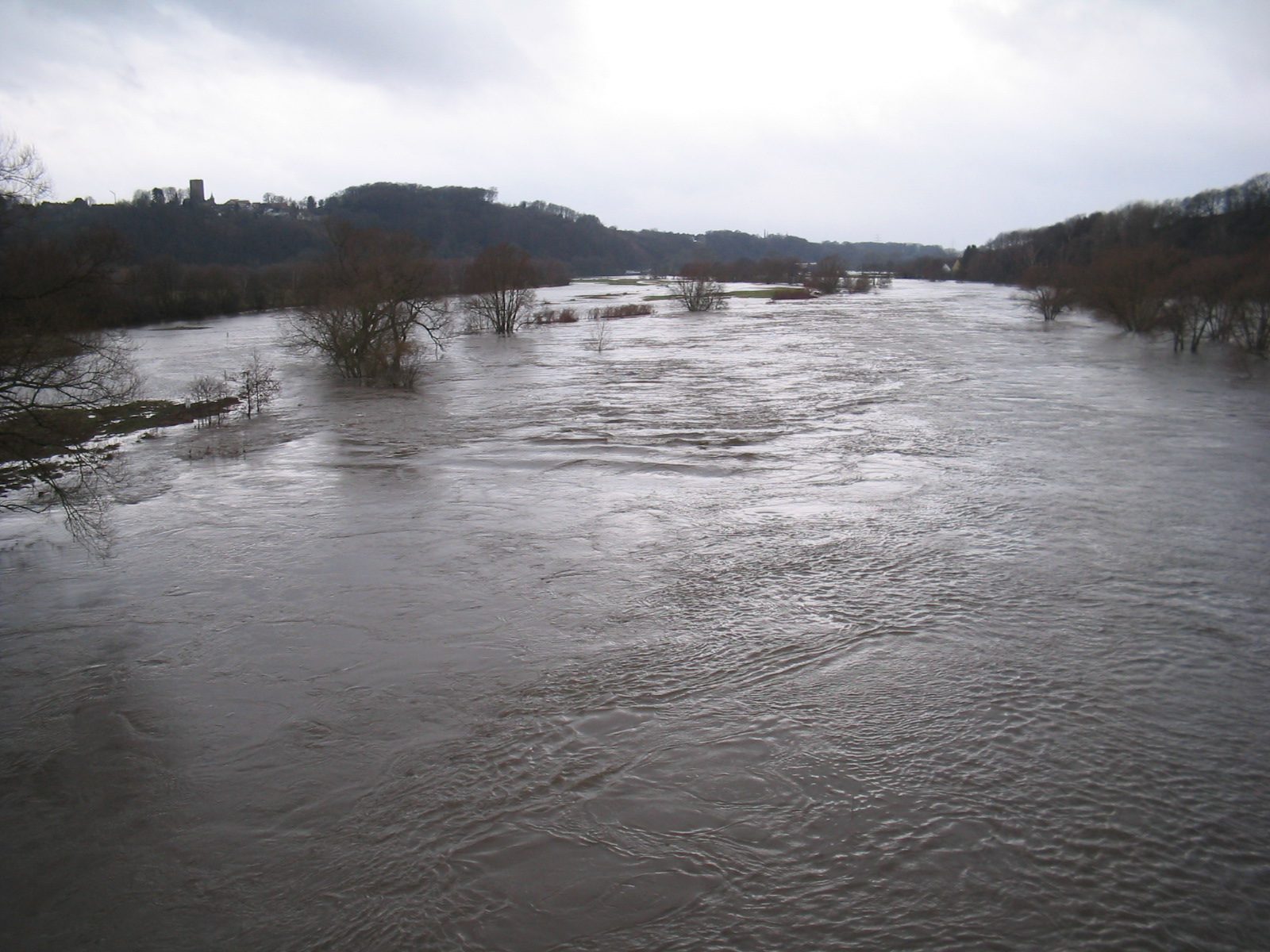
The Ruhr valley near Bochum during a flood

The source of the Ruhr is near the town of Winterberg in the mountainous Sauerland region, at an elevation of approximately 670 metres (2,200 ft). It flows into the lower Rhine at an elevation of only 17 metres (56 ft) in the municipal area of Duisburg. Its total length is 219 km (136 mi), its average discharge is 79 cubic metres per second (2,800 cu ft/s) at Mülheim near its mouth. Thus, its discharge is, for example, comparable to that of the river Ems in Northern Germany or the River Thames in the United Kingdom.

The Ruhr first passes the towns of Meschede, Arnsberg, Wickede, Fröndenberg, Holzwickede, Iserlohn, and Schwerte. Then the river marks the southern limit of the Ruhr area, passing Hagen, Dortmund, Herdecke, Wetter, Witten, Bochum, Hattingen, Essen, Mülheim, and Duisburg.

The Ruhr area was Germany's primary industrial district during the early- to mid-20th century. Many factories and mines were located there. The occupation of the Ruhr from 1923 to 1925 by French and Belgian forces, due to the Weimar Republic's failure to meet its reparations obligations from World War I, was countered with an official policy of passive resistance, which saw production in the factories grind to a halt. As a result, Germany's inflation problem exploded into a hyperinflation crisis.

During World War II, two of the dams on the Ruhr, the Möhne Dam and the Sorpe Dam were targets for Operation Chastise, in which special "bouncing bombs" were developed to take out the dams and flood the valley, with the hope of seriously affecting the German industries there. The story was told in a 1951 book and its popular 1955 film adaptation, The Dam Busters.

== Lakes ==
There are five Ruhr reservoirs on the river, often used for leisure activities.

- Hengsteysee between Dortmund and Hagen, surface area: 1.36 km^{2}, height of the weir 4.5 m
- Harkortsee between Herdecke and Wetter; surface area: 1.37 km^{2}, height of the weir 7.8 m
- Kemnader See between Witten and Bochum; surface area: 1.25 km^{2}, height of the weir 2 m
- Baldeneysee in Essen-Werden; surface area: 2.64 km^{2}, height of the weir 8.5 m
- Kettwiger See in Essen-Kettwig; surface area: 0.55 km^{2}, height of the weir 6 m

== Environment ==
The Ruhr was extensively used by adjacent factories for cooling-water and was heavily contaminated by industrial discharge in the 19th and 20th century, with significant negative impact. Large sections of the river were straightened, changing the habitat of the river and its shore significantly. This led to a decline in various fish species, particularly the brook trout and related salmonids.

The establishment of dozens of smaller and larger dams largely prevented migratory species like salmon and the European eel from ascending or descending the river as part of their lifecycle. Salmon have not been observed in the river in decades. Stocks of the European eel have dwindled. Both eel and brook trout stocks rely heavily on release of juveniles as part of conservation efforts.

Since 2013, the district government of Arnsberg, funded partially by grants of the European Union, is investing heavily into renaturation efforts to restore the natural river & habitat surrounding it. This includes various aspects, most significantly the removal or addition of bypasses to barriers such as dams along the whole river, to re-enable natural fish migration. Additionally, the river bed is widened substantially in sections, reducing the depth of the river and slowing down the flow of water, to enable natural reproduction of native fish, insects, etc.

Two sections of the renaturation have been completed (in Wickede & Witten) with two more projects currently underway. 18 additional projects are still in planning stages and as of now, the river is not fully passable for migratory fish.

== Tributaries ==
The main tributaries of the Ruhr are (from source to mouth):

- Left: Berkelbach, Voßmecke, Neger, Elpe, Valme, Nierbach, Henne, Kelbke, Wenne, Mühlenbach, Röhr, Bachumer Bach, Haßbach, Scheebach, Wimberbach, Hönne, Abbabach, Baarbach, Elsebach, Wannebach (Ergste), Lenne, Volme, Sprockhöveler Bach, Deilbach, Oefter Bach, Rinderbach
- Right: Hillebach, Gierskoppbach, Gebke (Meschede), Kleine Gebke, Gebke (Wennemen), Wanne, Möhne, Wannebach (Westhofen), Borbach, Wannenbach, Hörsterholzer Bach, Knöselsbach, Rumbach

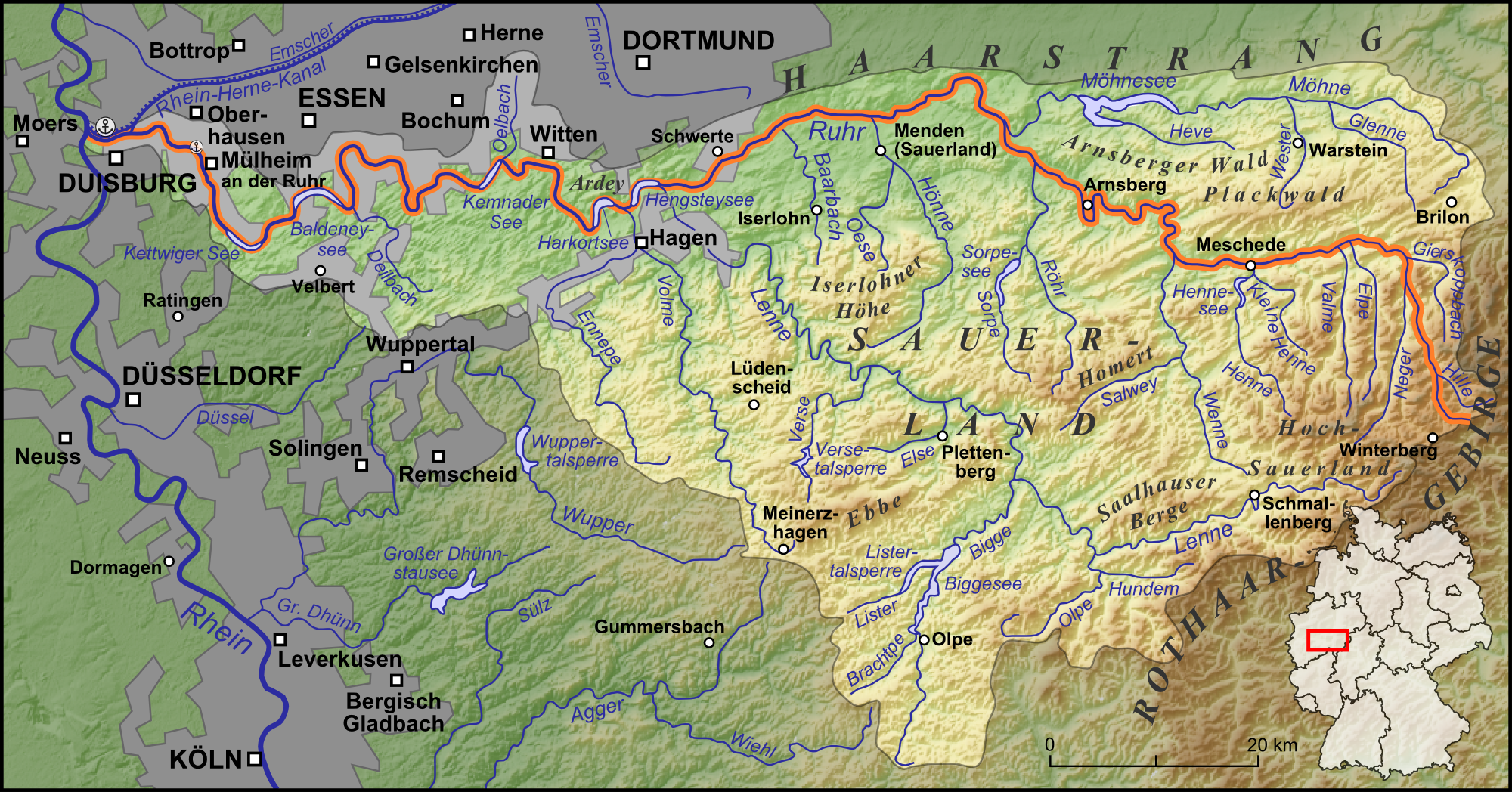
The drainage basin of the Ruhr

== See also ==
- Nearby rivers: Rhine, Lippe, Emscher
- Occupation of the Ruhr (1923–1924)
- Ruhr (area)
- Ruhrpolen: the Poles of the Ruhr
