= Province of Westphalia =

Province of Prussia (1815–1946)

Province of Westphalia Provinz Westfalen
- Province of Prussia
- 1815–1946
- Flag Coat of arms

- Westphalia (red), within the Kingdom of Prussia, within the German Empire

Anthem
- Westfalenlied "Westphalia Song"
- Capital: Münster
- Area
  - 1817: 20,215 km^{2} (7,805 sq mi)
- Population
  - 1925: 4,784,000
- History
  - Established: 1815
  - Disestablished: 1946
- Political subdivisions: Arnsberg; Minden; Münster
Preceded by
Minden-Ravensberg
Mark (county)
County of Tecklenburg
Bishopric of Münster
Bishopric of Paderborn
County of Limburg
Duchy of Westphalia
Sayn-Wittgenstein-Berleburg
Sayn-Wittgenstein-Hohenstein
Nassau-Siegen
Succeeded by
North Rhine-Westphalia

The Province of Westphalia (German: Provinz Westfalen) was a province of the Kingdom of Prussia and the Free State of Prussia from 1815 to 1946. In turn, Prussia was the largest component state of the German Empire from 1871 to 1918, of the Weimar Republic and from 1918 to 1933, and of Nazi Germany from 1933 until 1945.

The province was formed and awarded to Prussia at the Congress of Vienna in 1815, in the aftermath of the Napoleonic Wars. It combined some territories that had previously belonged to Prussia with a range of other territories that had previously been independent principalities. The population included a large population of Catholics, a significant development for Prussia, which had hitherto been almost entirely Protestant. The politics of the province in the early nineteenth century saw local expectations of Prussian reforms, increased self-government, and a constitution largely stymied. The Revolutions of 1848 led to an effervescence of political activity in the province, but the failure of the revolution was accepted with little resistance.

Before the nineteenth century, the region's economy had been largely agricultural and many rural poor travelled abroad to find work. However, from the late eighteenth century, the coal mining and metalworking industries of the Ruhr in the south of the province expanded rapidly, becoming the centre of the Industrial Revolution in Germany. This resulted in rapid population growth and the establishment of several new cities, which formed the basis of the modern Ruhr urban area. It also led to the development of a strong labour movement, which led to several large strikes in the late nineteenth and early twentieth centuries.

After World War II, the province was combined with the northern portion of Rhine Province and the Free State of Lippe to form the modern German state of North Rhine-Westphalia.

== Early history ==
=== Foundation and structure ===
Napoleon Bonaparte founded the Kingdom of Westphalia as a client state of the First French Empire in 1807. Although named for the historical region of Westphalia, it contained mostly Hessian, Angrian and Eastphalian territories and only a relatively small part of the region of Westphalia. After the reconquest of the region by the Sixth Coalition in 1813, it was put under the administration of the General government between the Weser and the Rhine.

It was not until the Congress of Vienna in 1815 that the Province of Westphalia came into being. Although Prussia had long owned territory in Westphalia, King Frederick William III made no secret of the fact that he would have preferred to annex the entirety of the Kingdom of Saxony.

The province was formed from several territories:

- regions in Westphalia under Prussian rule since before 1800 (the Prince-Bishopric of Minden and the counties of Mark, Ravensberg and Tecklenburg);
- the Prince-Bishoprics of Münster and Paderborn, acquired by Prussia in 1802–1803; the northernmost parts of the geographically enormous Bishopric of Münster, however, became part of the Kingdom of Hanover or the Grand Duchy of Oldenburg;
- the small County of Limburg, acquired in 1808;
- the portions of the Principality of Salm which had been annexed by France in 1810 and the southern part of the Duchy of Arenberg were acquired by Prussia in 1815 at the Congress of Vienna;
- the Duchy of Westphalia, placed under Prussian rule in 1816 following the Congress of Vienna;
- the Sayn-Wittgensteiner principalities of Hohenstein and Berleburg, along with the principality of Nassau-Siegen (in 1817);
- the Free Imperial City of Dortmund, given to Prussia in 1815 at the Congress of Vienna (occupied by Prussia since 1813)

In 1816, the district of Essen was transferred to the Rhine Province.

The new province had an area of 20,215 km^{2} (7,805 sq mi). The establishment of Westphalia and the neighbouring Rhine Province marked a decisive economic and demographic shift to the west for Prussia. It also marked a significant expansion of the number of Catholics in Prussia, which had hitherto been nearly exclusively Protestant. At the beginning of Prussian rule, the province had around 1.1 million inhabitants, of which 56% were Catholic, 43% Protestant, and 1% Jewish.

With the foundation of the province, the new administrative structure created during the Prussian reforms was introduced. The administrative incorporation of the province into the Prussian state was chiefly accomplished by the first Oberpräsident, Ludwig von Vincke. The province was divided administratively into three Regierungsbezirke (government districts): Arnsberg, Minden, and Münster. The borders of the province were slightly altered in 1851 and during the Weimar Republic.

In general, the Prussian administration focussed on the alignment of political institutions and administration, but legally they were distinct. In most parts of Westphalia, the General State Laws for the Prussian States (PrALR) were the fundamental basis of the law. In the Duchy of Westphalia and the two Sayn-Wittgensteiner principalities, however, the old regional legal traditions were retained until the introduction of the Bürgerliches Gesetzbuch (civil law code) on 1 January 1900.

=== Reaction to the establishment of the province ===
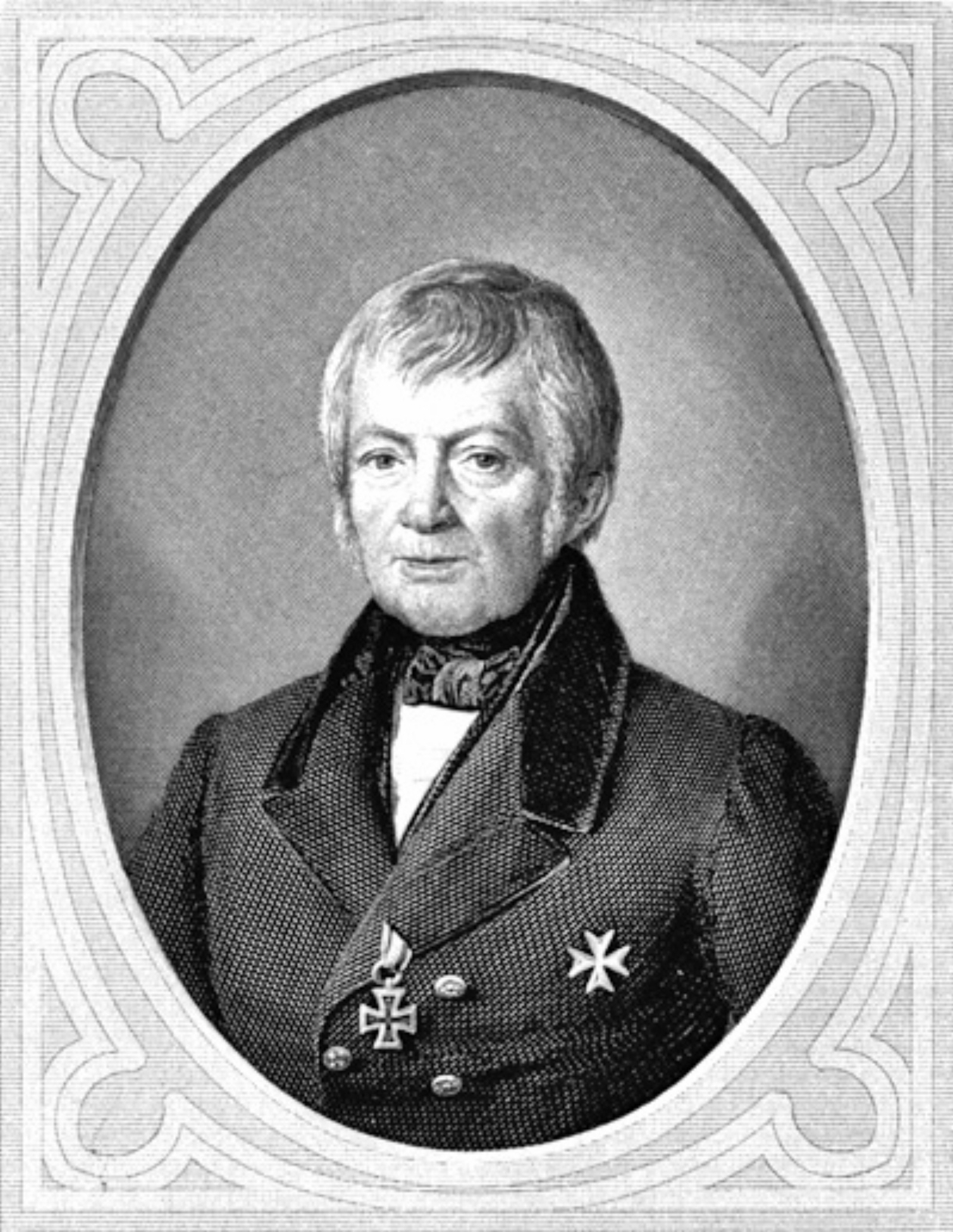
Ludwig von Vincke, first Oberpräsident of the province.

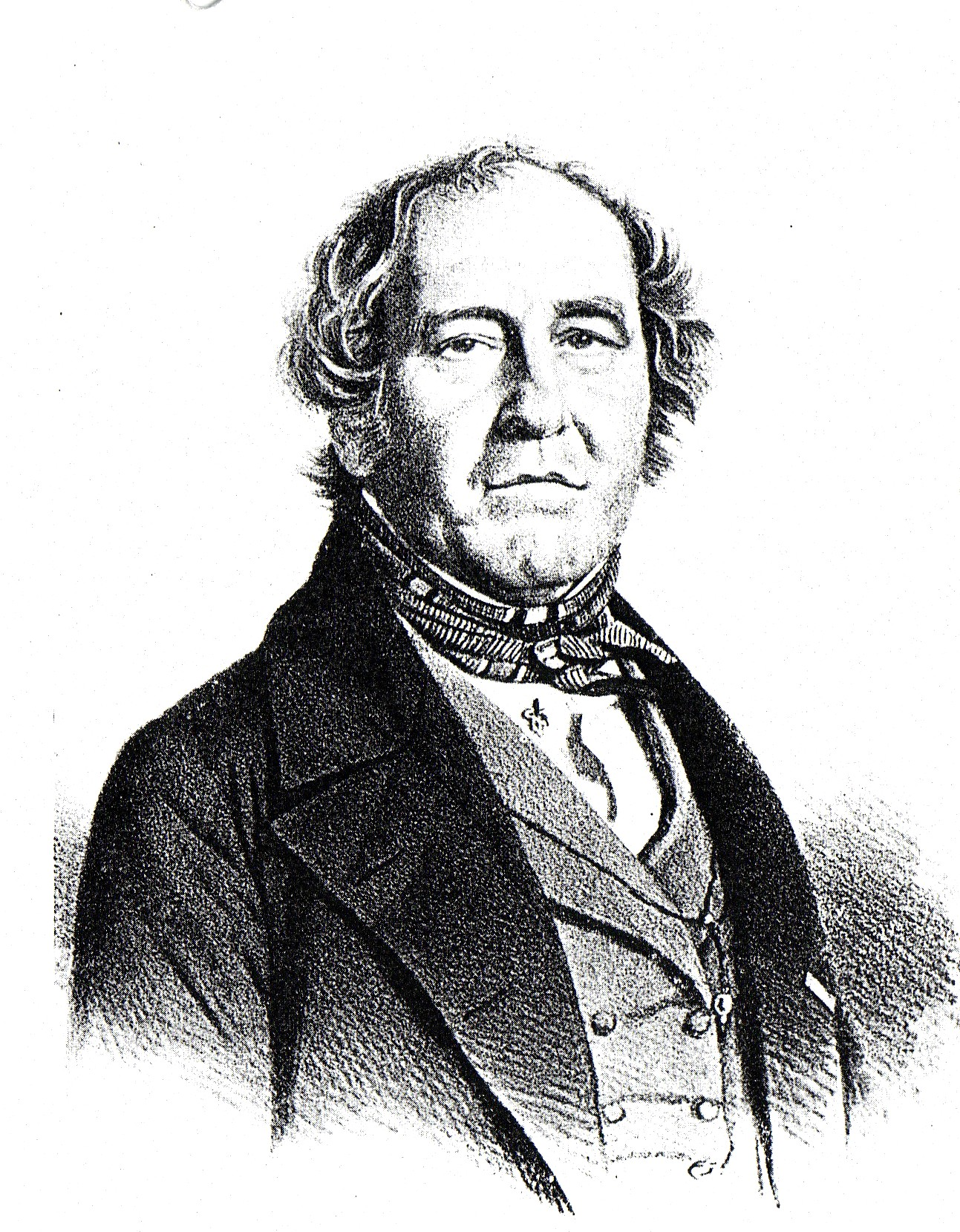
Johann Friedrich Joseph Sommer

The establishment of the province provoked different reactions in the region. In areas that had already been under Prussian control, like Minden-Ravensberg and the County of Mark, the return to their old connection with Prussia was celebrated. In Siegerland, acceptance of Prussian rule was eased by the fact that Protestantism was the main religion. Catholic areas, like the former prince-bishoprics of Münster and Paderborn and the Duchy of Westphalia, were particularly sceptical of the new lords. The Catholic nobility, which had played a leading role in the old prince-bishoprics, was mostly hostile. Twenty years after the province's establishment, Jacob Venedey called the Rhenanians and Westphalians Musspreußen ("have-to-be-Prussians").

In practice, the incorporation of the region into the Prussian state faced a number of problems. Firstly, the administrative unification was opposed by the mediatised houses (Standesherren). These nobles, who had ruled small principalities of their own before the Napoleonic Wars, retained special privileges of their own well into the nineteenth century. They maintained a certain amount of control or oversight over schools and churches. The second major problem for unification was the question of the redemption of manorial rights by the peasants within the context of peasant liberation. Although a law was passed in 1820 that allowed for redemption through monetary rents, there were also numerous individual regulations and regional peculiarities. Redemption remained controversial until 1848 and prompted significant conflicts in the provincial Landtags in the period before 1848, since these bodies were dominated by the landed nobility. The uncertainties surrounding land ownership were a cause of rural uprisings at the beginning of the Revolution of 1848. In the longer term, the fear that the peasants would be expelled from their land by great estates was not fulfilled. Instead, the two western provinces of Prussia remained the areas with the lowest number of large estates.

One thing that initially contributed to the acceptance of Prussia was the policy of reform, which aimed at the establishment of a "civic order". This involved the creation of a predictable system of administration and justice, rights of self-administration for communities, the emancipation of the Jews, and the liberation of the economy from guilds. The educated bourgeois class (the Bildungsbürgertum), both Protestant and Catholic, recognised that the Prussian government was the prime motor of change. In the longer term, the combination of such different territories into a single province had consequences for identity and self-perception. Throughout the 19th century, there always remained a consciousness of the old territories' pasts, but alongside this, a Westphalian self-perception also developed (fostered by the Prussian government). This often came into competition with the developing German national consciousness.

=== Constitutional debate and the Restoration Period ===
Bourgeois Westphalians like Johann Friedrich Joseph Sommer and Benedikt Waldeck were particularly hopeful for the promulgation of a constitution. In newspapers like the Rheinisch-Westfälischen Anzeiger and Hermann, the desire for a constitution was clearly articulated from the beginning. Draft constitutions were issued by Sommer and Arnold Mallinckrodt of Dortmund. Other participants in the debate included Adam Storck and Friedrich von Hövel. This optimistic attitude shifted with the beginning of the Restoration Period, when the absence of a national constitution and the censorship of the press became clear. Dietrich Wilhelm Landfermann, who was later a member of the Reichstag, wrote as a schoolboy in 1820, that it was not for the "pathetic squabbles of princes" that people had fought in 1813, but so that "justice and law would have to be the foundation of public life as well as citizenship."

The establishment of provincial parliaments (Landtags) in 1823 had little impact on the criticism, since they lacked central legislative powers. They had no right to raise taxes, were not involved in the drafting of laws, and had only advisory functions on important matters. The representatives were not allowed to discuss administrative matters and their minutes were subject to censorship.

The first Provinziallandtag of the Province of Westphalia met in the Münster City Hall in 1826. The high voter turnout shows that, despite all the restrictions, the bourgeoisie saw the Landtag as a forum for the expression of their views (the lower classes had no voting rights). The Baron vom Stein as first Landmarschall (presiding officer of the Landtag) did not restrict discussion to purely local matters, and under the surface, the constitutional question played an important role in discussions in the Landtag in 1826 and in the next Landtag in 1828. This became even clearer during the Landtag of 1830/31, when Franz Anton Bracht and even the noble Baron of Fürstenberg openly called for the establishment of a constitution for Prussia. The question of what such a constitution should look like was fiercely debated. Most nobles, including Fürstenberg, sought a restoration of the old order, while the bourgeoisie pursued early liberal ideas. In this, Bracht was supported by industrialist Friedrich Harkort and publisher Johann Hermann Hüffer, among others. Other members of the "opposition" included the mayor of Hagen, Christian Dahlenkamp and the mayor of Telgte, Anton Böhmer. Even among the landed nobility, there were supporters of liberalism, such as Georg von Vincke.

The district ordinance (Kreisordnung) of 1827 also clearly diverged from the basic ideas of the Prussian reformers. It provided for the election of district councils, which were basically drawn from the circle of the landed nobility and gave the people of the districts only a right to present their views for consideration; the appointment was reserved for the king. Equally untimely was the revised civic ordinance (Städteordnung) of 1831, which heavily restricted the voting right for town councils and provided for organs of self-government which were really just offices of the central government. The municipality ordinance (Landgemeindeordnung) was similar.

=== Lead-up to the 1848 Revolution ===
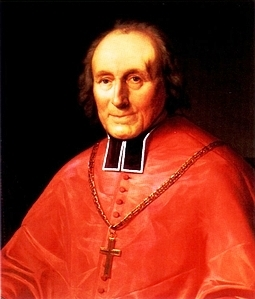
Clemens August Droste zu Vischering, Archbishop of Cologne

During the Vormärz, the period leading up to the German revolutions of 1848–1849, the importance of the constitutional question in Westphalia was not matched by interest in German unification, which was very low. The mayor of Rhede in Münsterland wrote in 1833, "The Hambach Festival and Burschenschaft colours have no meaning to the peace-loving inhabitants of this land." Public feeling in Sauerland and Minden-Ravensberg seemed similar. German nationalism only became a force in Westphalia in the 1840s. In many municipalities, singing clubs were formed, which nurtured national myths. Westphalian participation in the Cologne Cathedral construction festival and the gatherings in support of the Hermannsdenkmal was considerable. A lively mass of associations and clubs developed.

In addition to the disappointment about the failure of the promised reforms to materialise, the arrest of Archbishop of Cologne Clemens August Droste zu Vischering in 1837, during the "Cologne troubles" led to a greater politicisation of Westphalian Catholicism. The liberal Catholic journalist, Johann Friedrich Joseph Sommer, wrote, "Contemporary events, like those of the last ten years, have stirred up the docile Westphalian and have contributed no little degree to bring a kind of religious somnolence to an end." At the same time, Sommer saw the mass unrest in connection with the riots as a precursor of the revolutions of 1848. The "state must give way, for the first time, power quakes before the popular mood." In the 1830s and 1840s, the discussion circles of liberals, democrats, and even some socialists consolidated (e.g. the journal Weserdampfboot).

In addition, the agrarian reforms, which were negatively received by many rural groups, led to growing dissatisfaction. To this were added several bad harvests in the 1840s, which caused the price of food to rise notably, particularly in the cities. Traditional manufacturing also faced a stark structural crisis. A consequence of the difficult social situation was the high level of emigration. Between 1845 and 1854, around 30,000 people left the province, most heading overseas. Almost half of these people came from the crisis-ridden linen-producing areas in the eastern part of Westphalia.

=== Revolution of 1848-1849 in Westphalia ===
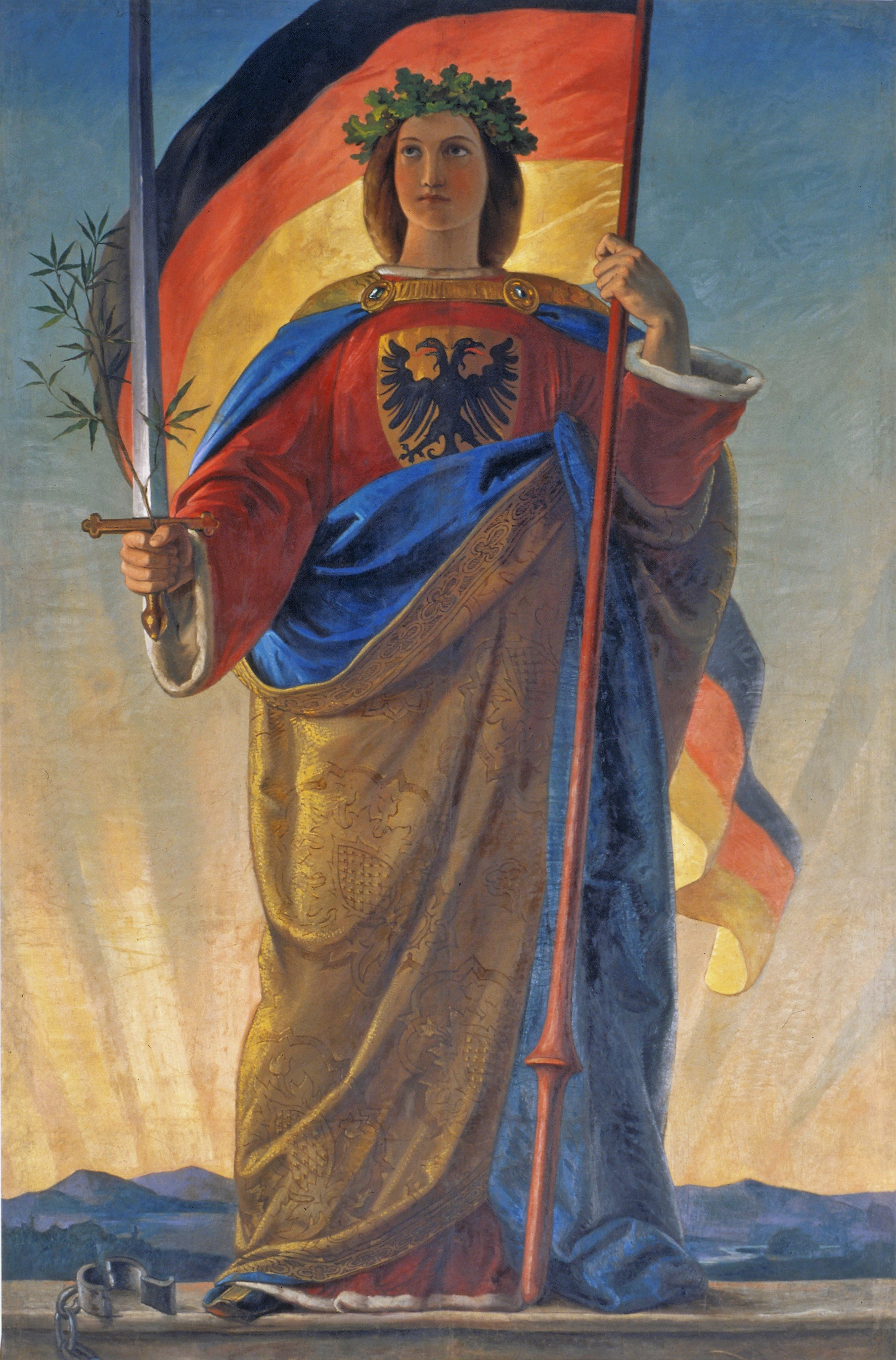
Germania, possibly by Philipp Veit.

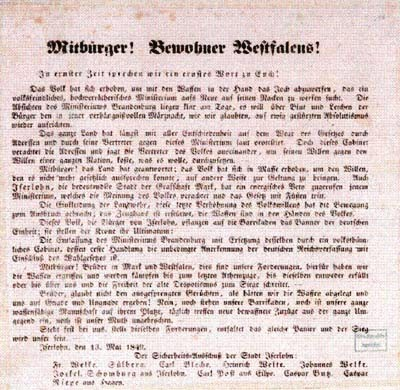
Proclamation of the Iserlohn Security Committee May 1849

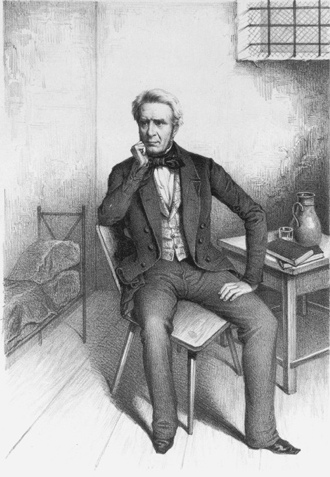
Benedikt Waldeck in prison.

In Westphalia, there were very diverse reactions to the outbreak of revolution in 1848. The democratic left of the "Rhede Circle" celebrated the coming of a new era in the Westphälisches Dampfboot, "The people of Europe, freed from the oppressive nightmare, have almost caught their breath." The journal Hermann, published in Hamm, supported the introduction of a new calendar era, on the model of the French revolutionary calendar. The left also looked to France for its political programme and called for "Wealth, Education, and Freedom for all." There were also countervailing opinions, like that of Bielfeld superintendent and later member of the Prussian National Assembly, Clamor Huchzermeyer, who spoke of a "disgraceful event", in which the "simple Philistine" expected "that a constitution would sweep all misery and inequality from the world". He feared the "collapse of all order" and general "disorder."

After news reached Westphalia of the February Revolution in Paris and the March Revolution in various parts of Germany, including Berlin and Vienna, rural uprisings broke out in parts of Westphalia, especially in the Sauerland, the Wittgenstein, and Paderborn. Some of the buildings of the stewards of Schloss Bruchhausen in Olsberg were attacked and the documents inside were burnt, as people sang – songs of freedom. Manors were attacked elsewhere, also, for example, in Dülmen. This rural revolt was quickly defeated by the military. In the areas of Westphalia where industrialisation was beginning to take hold, like the County of Mark, some factories were attacked. In the cities, there was talk of the appointment of a liberal government and the victory of the revolution was celebrated almost everywhere with parades and black-red-gold flags. However, there was also an anti-revolutionary movement, especially in the old Prussian parts of the province. In the County of Mark, this centred around the industrialist Friedrich Harkort, who promoted his views in his famous Arbeiterbriefen (Workers' Letters).

In the elections to the Prussian National Assembly and the Frankfurt Parliament, the political leanings of the candidates were not the decisive factor. Rather, their reputation among the people played a central role in their nomination. In Sauerland, therefore, the conservative Joseph von Radowitz, the liberal / ultramontanist Johann Friedrich Sommer, and the democrat Carl Johann Ludwig Dham were all elected. Leading Westphalians in the Prussian National Assembly included the democrats Benedikt Waldeck and Jodocus Temme. In constitutional discussions in Berlin, Waldeck and Sommer played notable roles on the left and right, respectively. In Frankfurt, Westphalia's representatives included Georg von Vincke, Gustav Höfken, and the later bishop Wilhelm Emmanuel von Ketteler.

In the province itself, political clubs and journals of every stripe were established. The spectrum ranged from Catholic and liberal pamphlets to Karl Marx's radical Neue Rheinische Zeitung. The range of political opinions was as diverse as the media landscape. However, conservative groups generally included only protestant officers and officials of the central government. A notable exception was the conservative attitude of rural people in the pietistic Lutheran milieu of Minden-Ravensberg. The vast majority of politically active bourgeoisie joined constitutional or democratic clubs. The liberals founded an umbrella organisation of constitutional societies in the provinces of Rhineland and Westphalia at a congress in Dortmund in July 1848. In the district of Arnsberg alone, there were twenty-eight such societies by October. In the other two districts, the number of societies was clearly lower and in Münster, the local association was split by internal conflicts. The democratic societies only managed to reach an agreement at a congress in September 1848. In Münster, the local democratic association had at least 350 members. The labour movement, in the form of the Allgemeine Deutsche Arbeiterverbrüderung (General German Workers' Brotherhood) had very little representation in Westphalia, compared with the Rhineland. There was a strong labour association in Hamm, which played a leading role in the democratic camp and maintained contacts with the Arbeiterverbrüderung at the same time. In total, the number of democratic and republican associations remained substantially lower than the liberal ones. In the Catholic parts of Westphalia, the first organisations of political Catholicism also developed at this time. The Pius Associations were established in many places, but were focused on the association in the provincial capital.

In petitions, workers' groups and community representatives called on their delegates to speak on behalf of their demands in the national assemblies. In the following months, the political excitement declined markedly. In Catholic areas, the election of Archduke John of Austria as regent (Reichsverweser) of the new German Empire by the Frankfurt Parliament was met with great enthusiasm and patriotic celebrations were held in Winterberg and Münster, for example. However, the reaction to this election showed that the difference between Catholics and Protestants in Westphalia was as great as ever. In the old Prussian areas, the duty of establishing unity and freedom was seen as resting above all with Prussia, while in Catholic Westphalia, the establishment of the Frankfurt Parliament was seen as a step towards a united state under Catholic leadership. Thus, the conflict between supporters of the little or greater solutions to the German question intersected with religious affiliation.

Only the beginning of the counter-revolution notably increased political excitement. In many parts of Westphalia, the power of the democrats increased, while the discontent of the people with hesitant liberals like Johan Sommer was palpable. In the face of the threat to the revolution's accomplishments, the democrats and constitutional rebels resolved to cooperate, culminating in the "Congress for the matter and rights of the Prussian National Assembly and of the Prussian People" in Münster in 1848. After the Prussian National Assembly was dissolved on 5 December 1848, democratic candidates like Johann Matthias Gierse managed to win election to the lower chamber of the Landtag of Prussia. The end of the revolution in Westphalia came with the comprehensive defeat of the Iserlohn Uprising in June 1849. A few Westphalian revolutionaries, like Temme and Waldeck, were later subject to political prosecutions. By summer 1849, Westphalian democrats had already begun departing for America.

== Economy and society ==
=== Pre-industrial period ===
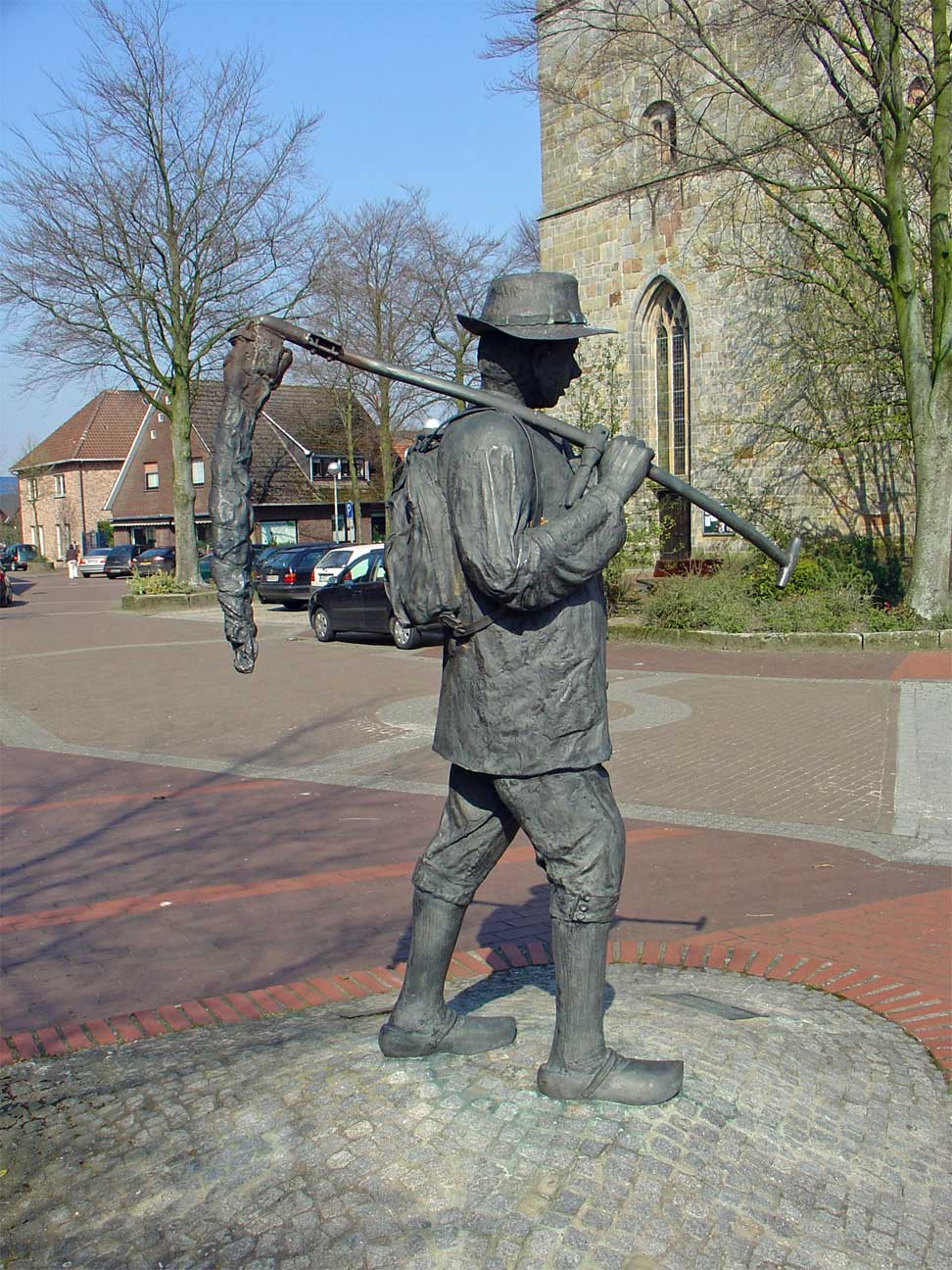
Sculpture depicting a Hollandgänger, Uelsen.

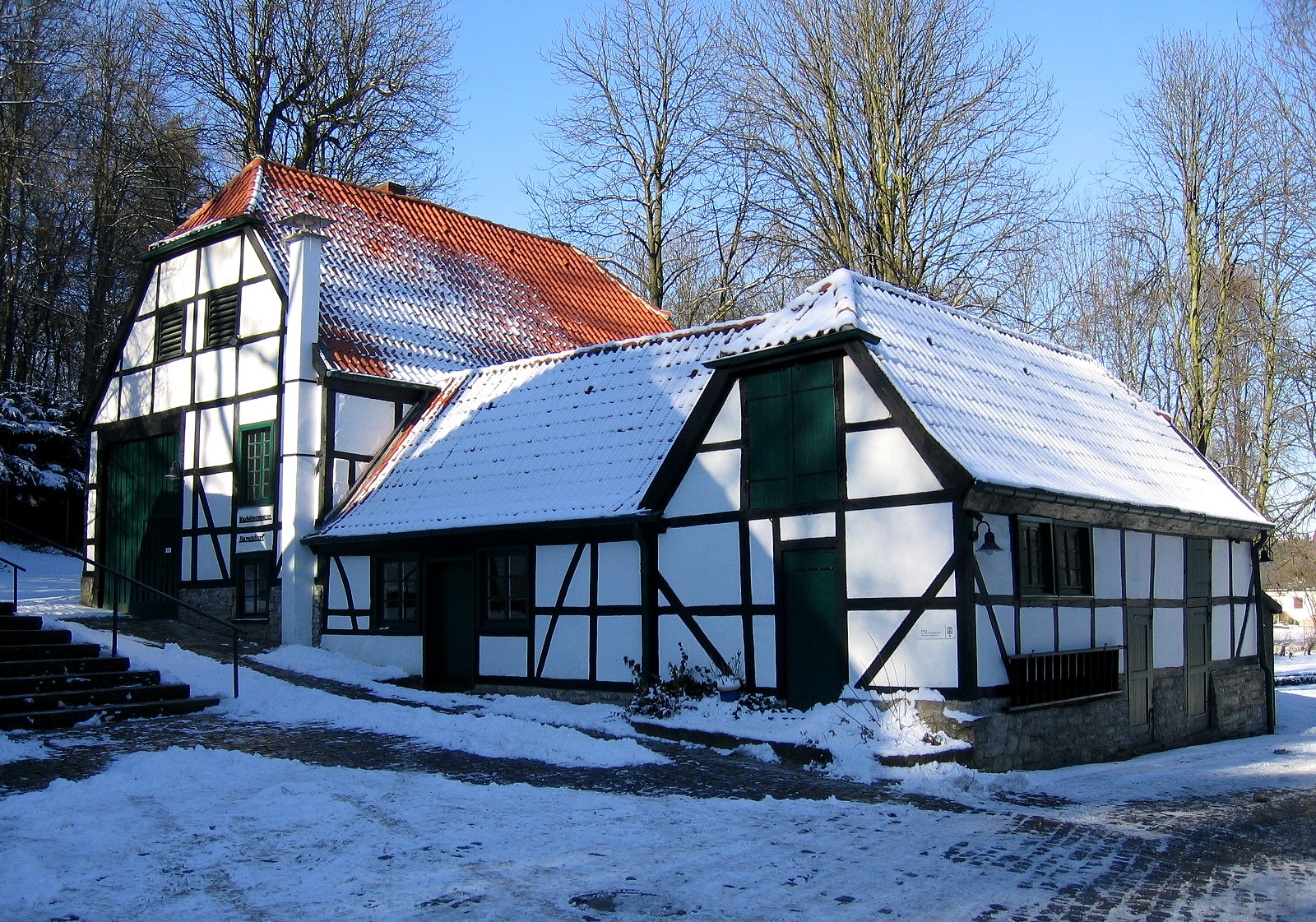
Maste-Barendorf historic factory, Iserlohn (ca. 1850), a pre-industrial factory, producing sewing needles.

At the beginning of the 19th century, Westphalia was already a very economically and socially diverse region. Agriculture was dominant and in many places it was still practiced in very traditional and ineffective ways. In most areas, small and medium farms were most common. Only in the Münsterland and Paderborn regions were larger establishments widespread. These areas, as well as the Soest Börde, were especially suitable for agriculture. On the other hand, agriculture in Minden-Ravensberg and the southern Bergisches Land was fairly unproductive. Even in the pre-industrial period, some agricultural products were exported. Westphalian ham was a known export commodity, for example. Industrialisation encouraged the integration of agricultural activity with the new centres of industrial production. The increased demand led to an expansion of pig farming. Cereals produced in the province were an important raw material for the brewing industry that developed first in the Ruhr and later elsewhere. In Dortmund alone, there were more than eighty individual breweries. The huge market for agricultural goods in the nearby industrial areas meant that in the fertile parts of the province, agriculture was the dominant industry well into the twentieth century and that it remained a profitable economic sector everywhere.

In many places, yields at the beginning of the nineteenth century were insufficient to support the growing population. The number of poor and landless peasants grew. Many of them sought opportunities to work outside their home regions. Travelling merchants like the Kiepenkerl and the Sauerland peddlers became a symbol of the region. In the northern part of the province, the Hollandgänger travelled to work in the Netherlands. Brickmakers from east Westphalia and the neighbouring principality of Lippe also migrated to work. The Tödden trade, in which men would make linen at home in winter and then travel to the Netherlands to sell it the following summer, developed from the Hollandgänger.

Within Westphalia, the low cost of labour enabled the expansion of pre-industrial manufacturing, which made products for export. In the "Northwest German linen belt," which stretched from western Münsterland, through Tecklenburg, Osnabrück, and Minden-Ravensberg, to modern Lower Saxony, household production developed into proto-industrial levels. Especially in Minden-Ravensberg, pre-industrial linen production played an important role. The fabric was bought up and sold on by Verleger (transporters).

In southern Westphalia, there was a major iron extraction and processing region in Siegerland, parts of the Duchy of Westphalia, and the Sauerland, which extended over the provincial borders to the Bergisches Land and Altenkirchen. The iron ore extracted in Siegerland and eastern Sauerland was smelted at places like Wendener Hütte and made into finished products in the western part of the region (e.g. wire drawing in Altena, Iserlohn, and Lüdenscheid, or sewing needles at Iserlohn). These businesses were partially cooperative and organised into a network by Reidemeisters. In the southern part of the Ruhr, coal was exported to neighbouring regions from early times. Zeche Alte Haase in Sprockhövel was active from the beginning of the 17th century, for example.

=== Industrialisation ===
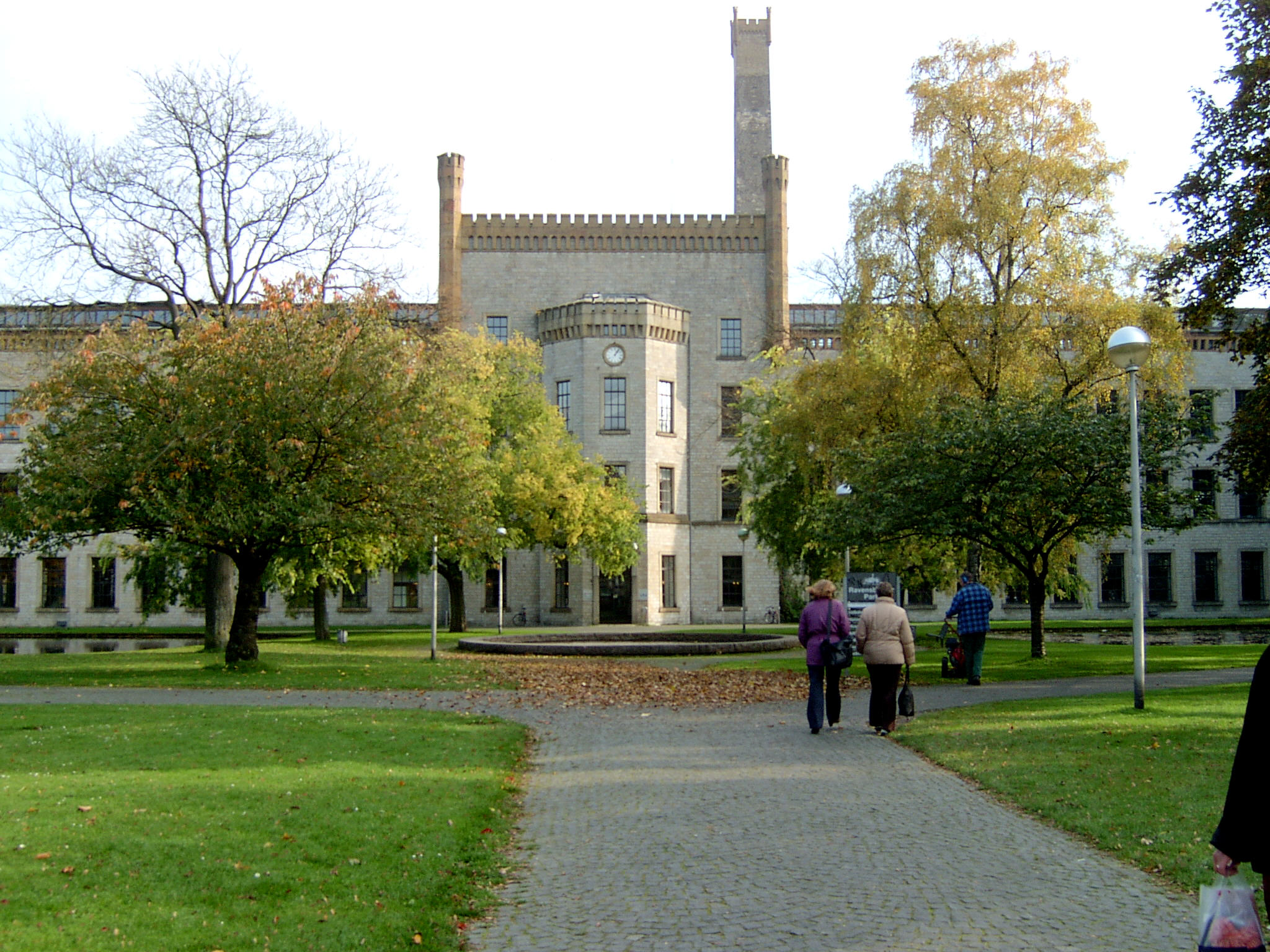
The Ravensberg Spinning Mill in Bielefeld.

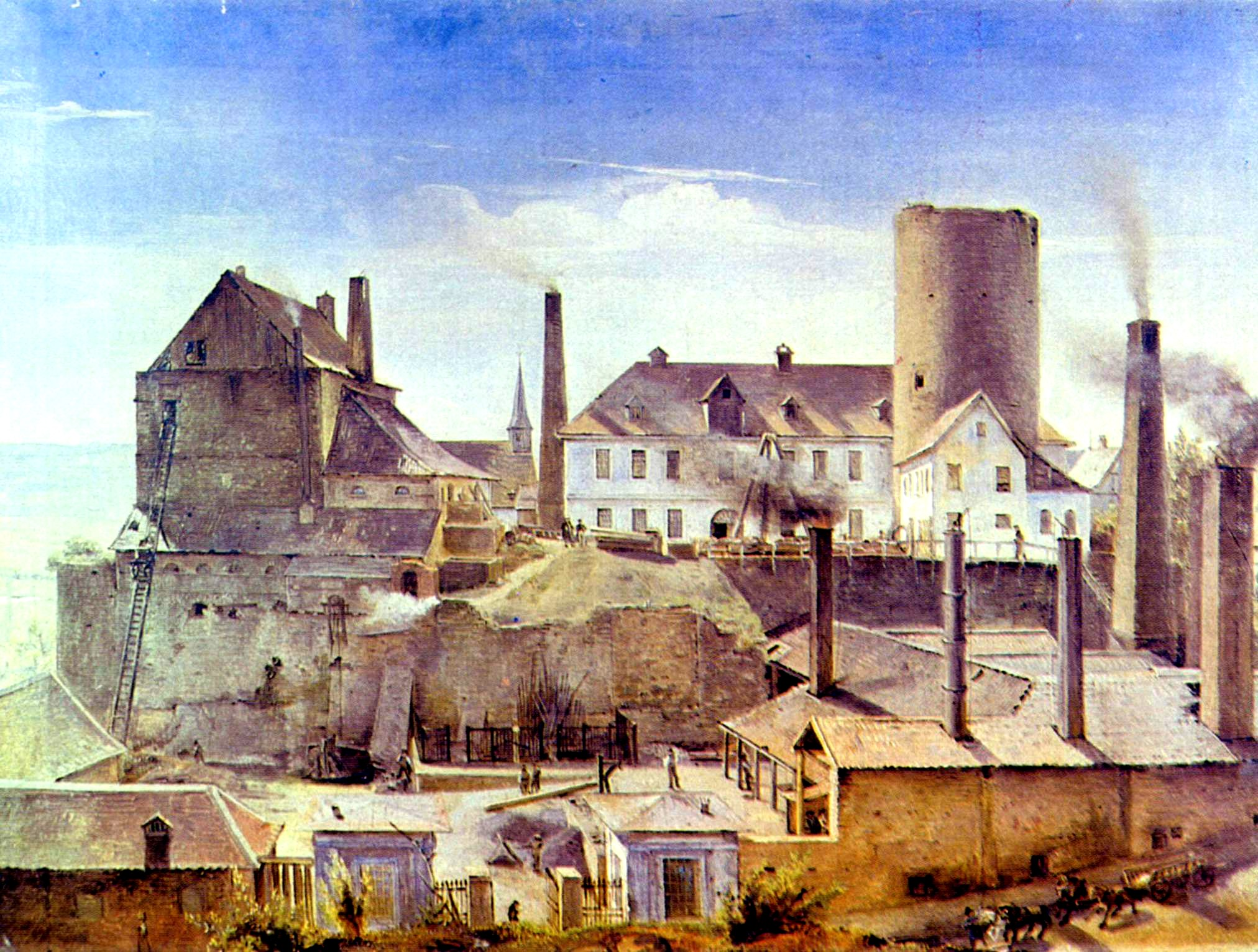
Friedrich Harkort's factory in the ruins of Wetter Castle.

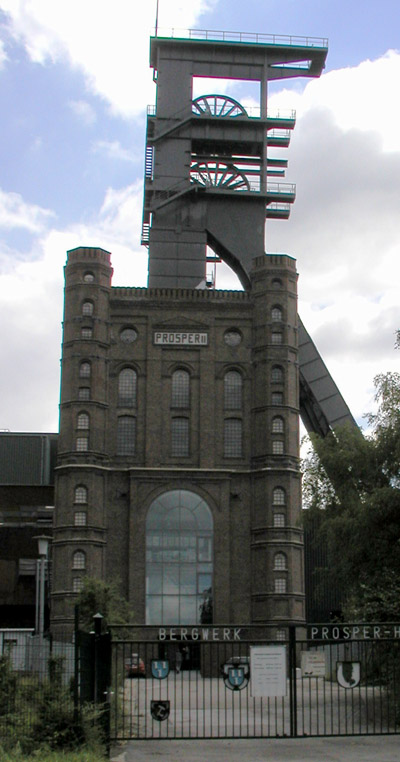
Historic headworks of the Zeche Prosper-Haniel in Bottrop (ca. 1870)

At the start of the nineteenth century, parts of the province were the first areas to see the Industrial Revolution in Germany and in the High industrial period, it was among the economic hubs of the German Empire.

The end of Napoleon's Continental System opened the region up to English industrial products. Household-based textile production in particular was not able to compete with this in the long term and eventually disappeared from the market. Conversion to industrial forms of production in and around Bielefeld enabled a transition to the new circumstances. The Ravensberg Spinning Mill, founded in 1854 by Hermann Delius, was the largest flax mill in Europe. In 1862, the "Bielfeld Action Society for Mechanical Weaving" (Bielefelder Actiengesellschaft für mechanische Weberei) was established. The success of textile enterprises was subsequently a basis for the establishment of iron and metalworking industries in the region. However, the new mechanised industry could not employ the available workforce like the old cottage industry. In the linen-producing areas of Westphalia, poverty and overseas emigration from rural areas rose sharply in the 1830s and 1840s.

In the ironworking and metalworking areas in southwestern Westphalia, industrial competition from overseas initially had only negative consequences. Some pre-industrial enterprises, like sheet metal production in and around Olpe, disappeared. More devastating for the old village smithies and cottage metalworking enterprises was the establishment of a modern metalworking industry in Westphalia itself, based on coal from the Ruhr. Decisive for the development of the mining in the Ruhr was the invention of longwall mining, which allowed the removal of the ore without stripping off the surface layer. This was employed for the first time in 1837 in the Ruhr region near Essen. In Westphalia, the first shaft mine was Zeche Vereinigte Präsident in Bochum, opened in 1841.

In 1818, Friedrich Harkort and Heinrich Kamp established Mechanische Werkstätten Harkort & Co., a mechanised ironworks, in Wetter and in 1826 in the same place they established the first puddling furnace in Westphalia. Later, the works were relocated to Dortmund where they developed into Rothe Erde. Further ironworks were established in Hüsten (Hüstener Gewerkschaft), Warstein, Lünen (Westfalenhütte), Hörde (Hermannshütte), Haspe (Hasper Hütte), Bochum (Bochumer Verein), and other places. These new coal-powered ironworks were far more productive than their charcoal-based pre-industrial equivalents.

A precondition for industrial development was the expansion of transport infrastructure. From the end of the 18th century, rural highways (Chaussee) began to be constructed, rivers in the lower part of the Ruhr were made navigable for ship traffic, and canals were built. Most of all, railways were the motor of industrial development. In 1847, the Cologne-Minden Railway Company completed a west-east branch line from the Rhine to the Weser. The Bergisch-Markisch Railway Company's Elberfeld–Dortmund railway followed in 1849 and the Royal Westphalian Railway Company was established in the same year.

Regions like Sauerland, which were only connected to the railway network in the 1860s or 1870s, remained economically marginal even in this age of economic growth. Some parts of these regions experienced a marked process of deindustrialisation. Instead, in many places, forestry took over, and from that point on was practiced in a sustainable manner. Only a few places, like Schmallenberg with its concentration on sock production, saw new industrial developments. The expansion of mining in the region also slowed.

As the nineteenth century progressed, the coal mining industry in the Ruhr grew ever stronger. In the 1850s, Hermannshütte, Rothe Erde, Aplerbecker Hütte, Hörder Bergwerks- und Hütten-Verein, and Henrichshütte in Hattingen were established. As a result, some of the pre-industrial areas in Westphalia became marginal and were only able to succeed by concentrating on particular products (e.g. lead production in Hüsten). Even more new pit mines and mining companies were established in the Ruhr region in the following years, such as the Schalker Verein. Moreover, older factories grew into massive enterprises with several thousand employees. By the middle of the nineteenth century at the latest, the Westphalian portion of the Ruhr was clearly the economic centre of the province.

=== Population growth and social change ===
Population growth in Westphalia
Year	Population
1816	1,066,000
1849	1,489,000
1871	1,775,000
1880	2,043,000
1890	2,413,000
1900	3,137,000
1910	4,125,000
1925	4,784,000
1939	5,209,000

The developing industry initially pulled numerous job seekers, mostly from the agriculturally and economically stagnant parts of the province. From around the 1870s, the supply of workers within Westphalia was exhausted and companies increasingly drew workers in from the eastern provinces of Prussia and beyond. The large number of Polish-speaking workers established their own societies, labour unions and pastoral care organisations, which operated in their own language. A particular population profile developed in the mining districts, which differed from the rest of Westphalia in some respects, such as dialect (Ruhrdeutsch). In 1871, the province of Westphalia had 1.78 million inhabitants, around 14% more than in 1858. By 1882, the population had grown by more than 20% and the growth from then to 1895 was similarly high. In the ten years between 1895 and 1905, the population grew by more than 30%, surpassing 3.6 million. The highest growth took place in the Arnsberg district, the centre of Westphalian industry. Between 1818 and 1905, the population of Münster and Minden districts grew by slightly more than 100%, but that of Arnsberg grew by over 400%.

In all the industrialised areas of Westphalia, but especially in the Ruhr, the social consequences of industrialisation were substantial. In these areas, the working class became the largest social group by some margin. Immigration meant that the population growth over time was erratic. The supply of housing was insufficient and, in the Ruhr, lodgers and Schlafgänger (people who rented a room for only a couple of hours a day) were common. Corporations sought to plug this gap to some extent with company housing or workers' settlements. The ulterior motive for this was the creation of a workforce that was loyal to the corporation and would not engage with the labour movement.

The population growth led to the development of a number of towns and villages into large cities. While some cities, like Dortmund and Bochum, had a long civic heritage to look back on, places like Gelsenkirchen and Recklinghausen grew from small villages to major centres in a matter of decades. Other settlements that became major industrial cities included Witten, Hamm, Iserlohn, Lüdenscheid, and Hagen (now on the edge of the mining area), as well as Bielefeld.

=== Urban life ===
A characteristic of the rapidly growing industrial cities was the general absence of the bourgeoisie. The middle class was notably weak. The cities concentrated at first on the most essential infrastructure, like supply routes, rubbish collection, public transport, schools, etc. Improved hygiene conditions brought the death rate down markedly, especially among children. Epidemics like cholera ceased to play a significant role. On the other hand, the limits of these positive developments are clear from the continued prevalence of tuberculosis, work-related illnesses like silicosis, and the general strain on the environment from mining and industry.

The new industrial cities only acquired cultural infrastructure, like museums and theatres, later on. These were concentrated in the old cities, which had a civic tradition, and did not appear in the newly formed industrial centres until well into the twentieth century. There was little provision for higher education. Although the universities of Münster and Paderborn were established in the 18th century, these were reduced to "rump universities" with only a limited offering of courses at the beginning of Prussian rule. Münster was only promoted to full university status in 1902. The establishment of higher education in the Ruhr area only really began during the expansion of higher education in the 1960s.

=== Social disruption and unionisation ===
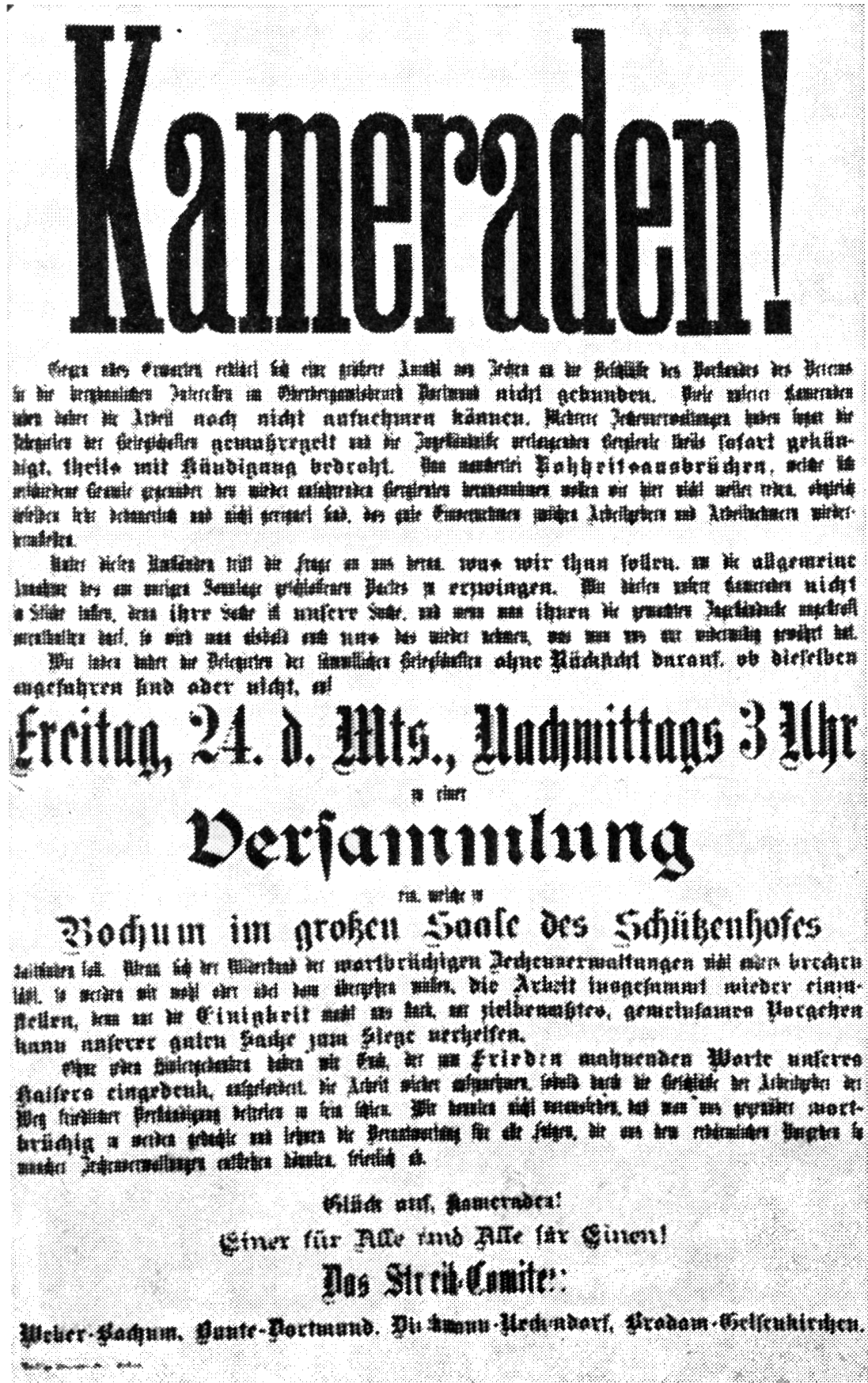
"Comrades!" Advertisement of a meeting, miners' strike of 1889.

The rapid expansion of mining and industry in the Ruhr region in the context of the Industrial Revolution led to a drastic transformation of the province's society and economy and massive population growth. With the introduction of the General Mining Act in 1865, the privileges of the "Bergknappen" ("ordinary miners") came to an end, and thereafter miners did not differ from other workers in their employment rights. Initially, they reacted to falling wages, extended hours and other issues as normal, with – generally unsuccessful – petitions to government administration. Increasingly, they began to adopt the forms of action used by other groups of workers. The first miners' strike in the Ruhr took place in 1872. It was local, limited, and unsuccessful.

In 1889, the pent-up anger of the previous decades was unleashed in a major strike, in which roughly 90% of the 104,000 miners then working in the region participated. The strike began in Bochum on 24 April and Essen on 1 May. They were joined spontaneously by numerous other workers. A central strike committee was formed. The workers sought higher wages, the introduction of an eight-hour day, and various other changes. That the miners' old loyalty to authority had not been forgotten is shown by the fact that the strike committee sent a deputation to Kaiser Wilhelm II. Although he criticised the strike, he agreed to launch an official investigation of the strike. Since the Dortmund District Association for Mining Interests indicated a willingness to make concessions, the strike gradually petered out.

The strike in the Westphalian and Rheinish coal mining areas provided a model for miners in Sauerland, the Aachen coalfields, and even in Silesia in the same year. Moreover, the strike had clearly shown that an organisation was necessary to advocate for workers' interests. On 18 August 1889, what would later be known as the "Alte Verband" ("Old Union") was established in Dortmund-Dorstfeld. The Christian Miners' Union was founded in 1894 and a Polish Union in 1902. The Hirsch-Dunckersche Gewerkvereine began attempts at organisation in the 1880s, but remained insignificant. With respect to unionisation, the miners also provided a model for other groups of workers.

In 1905, another strike broke out in the Bochum region, which grew into a general strike of all mining unions. In total, around 78% of miners in the region participated in the strike. Although it eventually had to break up, it had indirect success, since the Prussian government met many of the workers' demands through revisions to the General Mining Act. In 1912, the Alte Verband, Polish Union and the Hirsch-Dunckersche Union joined together in a three-union strike, although the Christian Miners' Union refused to lend its support. As a result, strike participation reached only about 60%. The strike was prosecuted with great bitterness and violent riots led the police and military to intervene in the end. The strike eventually broke up without success.

Alongside the miners, Westphalian workers in other areas also participated in the labour movement. In the metal industry, these actions were focused on small and medium-sized enterprises and the labour movement was not able to establish a toehold in the larger companies for various reasons. In particular, employers in the iron and steel industry defended their "Lord-of-the-Manor position" by firing workers as necessary. This was enabled by the starkly differentiated internal structure of these companies, which militated against the establishment of a sense of common purpose like that of the miners.

== Political culture ==
The political culture of Westphalia, reflected above all in the long-term shifts in electoral results, was closely linked to the religious and social structure of the province, but also to the political debates of the first half of the nineteenth century. In particular, religion played a central role in Westphalia. As in the rest of Germany, this led to the formation of Catholic and social democratic milieus, which heavily shaped the lives of their members "from the cradle to the grave." This tendency was less marked among the liberals and conservatives. On 1 August 1886, the districts and cities of Westphalia formed a Provinzialverband ("provincial union"), a body whose members henceforth met as the Westphalian provincial Landtag. Henceforth, the Landtag consisted of the representatives of the districts and cities, elected by means of the Prussian three-class franchise. The Landtag elected a head of government for the province, known as the Landeshauptman or "Headman of the State" (Landesdirektor before 1889).

=== Centre Party ===
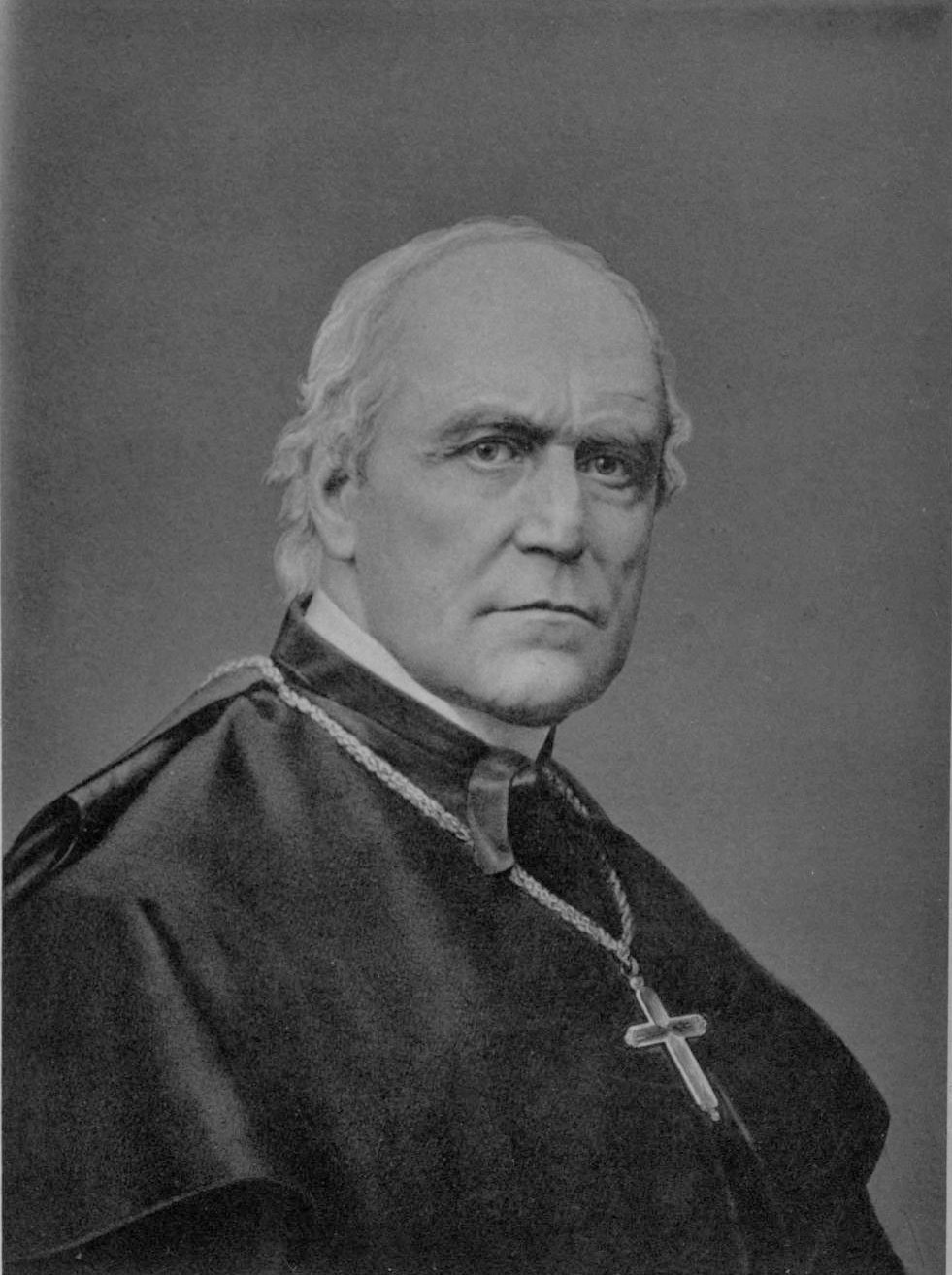
Wilhelm Emmanuel von Ketteler.

Especially following the Kulturkampf, the Centre Party (Zentrum), based on the traditional patterns from the early nineteenth century and the Revolution of 1848, largely monopolised politics in the Catholic parts of the province. The party was focussed on religious confession and was supported regardless of social class by Catholic workers, farmers, bourgeoisie, and nobility. Westphalia was the party's heartland. The party grew out of a meeting of politicians in Soest in the 1860s to discuss the foundation of a Catholic political party. The 1870 Soest Programme was one of the founding documents of the party. Wilhelm Emmanuel von Ketteler and Hermann von Mallinckrodt were among the leading politicians in the establishment of the party who came from the province of Westphalia.

From the 1890s, social differences led to a clear regional differentiation within the party. In the predominantly rural areas, the Centre Party was usually rather conservative and the Westfälischer Bauernverein ("Westphalian Farmer's Association") had an influential role. The Association primarily represented small- and medium-scale farmers; the landed nobility remained influential well into the Weimar Republic and could take care of themselves politically. In the Münster-Coesfeld electorate, someone like Georg von Hertling (later Minister-President of Bavaria and Imperial Chancellor) stood as a candidate from 1903 to 1912. Similarly, the later Chancellor Franz von Papen, who belonged to the far right wing of the party, came from rural Werl and had his political base in Münsterland.

On the other hand, in the industrialised parts of the province, social Catholicism was very strong. This current was particularly strong in the Ruhr and in Sauerland. The Christian unions there were mostly stronger than their social-democratic competitors. Westphalian Catholics like August Pieper and Franz Hitze, who were both leaders of the People's Association for Catholic Germany, were prominent individuals who were engaged in social politics.

Alongside increasing secularisation, the social focus of political Catholicism was a reason why the Centre Party lost support in middle-class areas during the Weimar Republic. In Sauerland, the party's support in 1933 had fallen to around 20% of what it had been in 1919. Nevertheless, in Catholic areas it generally remained the leading political force and remained the leading party in both of the province's electorates in the 1930 German federal election.

=== Social democrats and communists ===
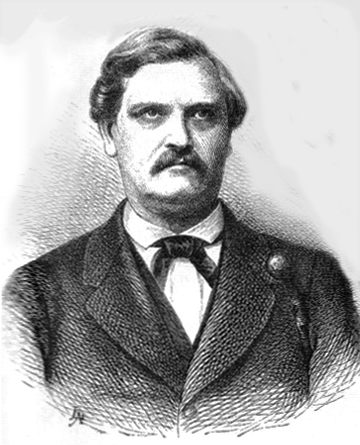
Portrait of Carl Wilhelm Tölcke.

The Centre Party's dominance in Westphalia meant that liberal, conservative, and social democratic movements were restricted to Protestant Westphalia. Thus, leading early social democrats, like Carl Wilhelm Tölcke and Wilhelm Hasenclever, came from Catholic Sauerland, but began their careers in the neighbouring Protestant areas.

The County of Mark and the area around Bielfeld were early hotbeds of social democracy. In Mark, Ferdinand Lassalle's General German Workers' Association (ADAV) and its successors were strong from its foundation in 1863. Above all, Tölcke was responsible for the establishment of local branches of the party in Iserlohn, Hagen, Gelsenkirchen, Bochum, Minden and Oeynhausen by 1875. The ADAV merged with the Social Democratic Workers' Party of Germany (SDAP) in 1875 to form the Social Democratic Workers' Party (SAP), which was later redubbed the Social Democratic Party of Germany (SDP). After this, Tölcke ran as the party's main candidate in Westphalia. In Bielefeld, personalities like Carl Severing had a substantial impact on political life from the Empire until the early years of the Federal Republic of Germany.

Before 1933, the Westphalian portion of the Ruhr was in no way a "heartland" of the SPD. Although the social democratic "Old Union" was the first workers' union, it was weaker than the Christian unions by the turn of the century, and was subsequently also challenged by a significant Polish workers' association. Only in Protestant parts of the coalfields, like Dortmund, was the SPD able to achieve significant power in the period before World War I. The mining workers' leaders, Otto Hue and Fritz Husemann were among the leading social democrats in the Ruhr.

In the Ruhr, the SPD was even more directly affected by the crises of the Weimar Republic than the Centre Party. Disenchantment with the party's approach to the Ruhr uprising in 1920, the hyperinflation between 1921 and 1923, and the Great Depression in the 1930s led many workers to move to the far left, initially to syndicalism and later to communism. The Communist Party of Germany (KPD) was already a mass party before the Great Depression, while the SPD fell into the background.

=== Liberals and conservatives ===
In growing cities like Dortmund and Bielefeld, which had a considerable bourgeoisie and a comparatively strong middle class, the SPD was unable to dominate the political landscape. This was due to the Prussian three-class franchise, which gave the rich disproportionate voting power in Prussian elections, and these classes' support for the liberal and conservative movements.

These movements also attracted members of the working class. In Siegerland, the Protestant working class long remained conservatives or adherents of Adolf Stoecker's Christian Social Party, which combined a strong Christian-right programme with progressive ideas on labour and tried to provide an alternative for disillusioned Social Democrat voters. Stoecker was elected to the Reichstag in the Siegen-Wittgenstein-Biedenkopf electorate in the 1881 German federal election. The socialist parties did not manage to gain a foothold in Siegerland until the time of the Weimar Republic.

Minden-Ravensberg remained a stronghold of the German Conservative Party until the 1912 German federal election, when the Minden-Lübbecke electorate went over to the liberal left Progressive People's Party

The south of the old County of Mark, especially the Hagen-Schwelm electorate, was a stronghold of liberalism, particularly the liberal left-wing German Free-minded Party of Eugen Richter, who held Hagen-Schwelm until 1906.

Most liberal and conservative voters went over to the Nazi Party during the Great Depression.

== World War I and the Weimar Republic ==
=== World War and Revolution ===
At the beginning of World War I, the same nationalist enthusiasm prevailed in Westphalia as in the rest of Germany. In contrast to the widespread skepticism about the Austro-Prussian War in 1866 and the Franco-Prussian War in 1870, the enthusiasm also extended to the Catholic parts of the province and to the working class. The local newspaper in Arnsberg recorded, on the occasion of the Austro-Hungarian mobilisation, "Suddenly, someone began the song Deutschland, Deutschland über alles and the crowd immediately joined in with gusto [...] As more troops marched through the streets, their sympathy for the allied Danube monarchy and their martial enthusiasm were expressed through their singing of patriotic songs. Loud rallies of the locals expressed their enthusiasm. Only late at night did it finally fall quiet". Similar accounts are recorded from other parts of the province. However, this enthusiasm was not universal. In rural areas and small towns, concern about the war and the future was widespread.

The daily experience of the war, especially the short phase of significant unemployment immediately after the outbreak of the war, the rising prices, and the food shortages in industrial cities in the second half of the war, dampened the initial enthusiasm. Gradually, the existing political system of the province began to lose legitimacy. Within the social democratic workers' unions and the SPD, criticism of the Burgfriedenspolitik (policy of party truce) led to the formation of the Independent Social Democratic Party of Germany (USPD) in 1917. Although the SPD's membership numbers decreased significantly in Westphalia, only a few local party organisations (like those in Hagen and Schwelm) crossed over to the new party. The Centre Party, which dominated Westphalia, supported the monarchy with all their strength until the end, but among its voters, war weariness increased ever more.

From the beginning of 1918, social unrest increased markedly and there were numerous strikes throughout the province. However, the November Revolution was sparked by external forces. On 8 November 1918, mutinying sailors from the High Seas Fleet reached Westphalia by train. They were joined in Bielefeld, Münster, and soon throughout the province, by the troops garrisoned there. Everywhere, workers' and soldiers' councils were established, which generally supported the revolutionary government of Friedrich Ebert and supported the establishment of a parliamentary democracy. In Westphalia, their members were mostly supporters of the social democratic parties, although in the Catholic parts of the province, some Christian unions also participated. The broad support for the revolution soon waned, however, in the context of the elections for the Weimar National Assembly, as Catholics opposed the "new Kulturkampf" of Minister Adolph Hoffmann (USPD). At the same time, there was even some support for the establishment of an independent "Rhinish-Westphalian Republic."

=== Weimar Republic ===
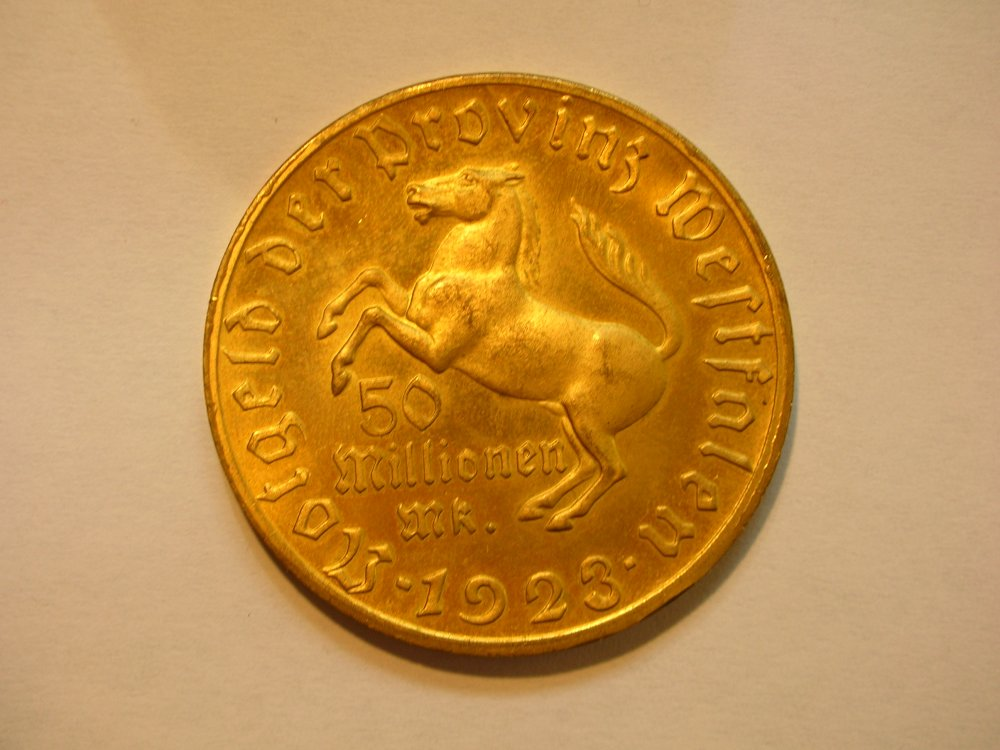
50 million mark coin, Westphalia, 1923

Provincial Landtag Elections 1921–1933 (vote %)
Year	Centre Party	SPD	DVP	DNVP	KPD	DDP	Nazi	Other
1921	35.5	24.7	13.0	8.8	7.3	4.4	–	6.3
1925	35.1	22.8	11.7	10.7	9.3	2.7	–	2.2
1929	32.9	22.1	8.7	6.3	9.3	2.5	2.9	12.5
1933	28.2	15.1	–	6.8	10.3	–	36.2	2.3

In January 1919, parts of the Westphalian Workers' and Soldiers' Councils were beginning to radicalise. There was a campaign for nationalisation of the mining industry and a widespread strike movement in the Rhinish and Westphalian parts of the Ruhr. On the political right, the Freikorps began to form in the province on the lines of the general commando in Münster. When these began to move against the strikers, the strike had reached its peak with 400,000 participants across the coalfields. Externally, calm was restored by Carl Severing, the leading social democrat in Bielefeld and a Prussian Staatskommissar, although he did not actually defuse the tension.

In March 1920, the Ruhr uprising broke out following the call for a general strike in protest against the right-wing Kapp Putsch in Berlin. Radical left workers used the strike as an opportunity to attempt the establishment of a Soviet-style council republic. During the strike, spontaneously formed workers' councils sprang up across the Ruhr and took control of the region with the support of 50,000 armed workers who quickly formed the Red Ruhr Army. After the German government's attempts to negotiate a peaceful settlement failed, it sent in both Reichswehr and paramilitary Freikorps troops to put down the rebellion. They acted with considerable brutality, including summary executions of prisoners and the killing of wounded fighters. The government victory cost the lives of over 1,000 workers and about 600 Reichswehr and Freikorps soldiers.

As part of the democratisation of Prussia, voting for the Westphalian Landtag was changed to equal suffrage in 1921.

Normality was short-lived in the Ruhr, since the Occupation of the Ruhr by French and Belgian troops began on 11 January 1923. This led to a call for a campaign of passive resistance by the Weimar Government, but this was eventually broken. The costs of this were a contributing factor to the start of hyperinflation. During the period of hyperinflation, Westphalia printed some Notgeld ("emergency money") with portraits of Annette von Droste-Hülshoff, the Baron vom Stein, and the heraldic Saxon Steed, with face values of up to a billion marks. In practice, only the 1921 coins were actually used as Notgeld. The other issues had a "medallion character".

After the introduction of the Rentenmark in 1923, the political and economic situation in the province stabilised for several years. However, in 1928, the Ruhr iron dispute and the lockout of 200,000 workers showed how fragile peace was.

=== Reichsreform and district reform ===
During the Weimar Republic, discussion on a national reform of the provinces (Reichsreform) placed the existence of the provinces in question. In response, the provincial administration attempted to use folklore and history to legitimise the idea of a historical "Westphalian region". This led to the publication of a work called Raums Westfalen in several volumes, starting in 1931, which dealt with the question of whether there was a "Westphalian region" in northwest Germany, which was distinct from the rest of the region. The conclusion was not entirely clear. Some people were confident that Lippe, Osnabrück, parts of Oldenburg, and other areas outside the province belonged to the historical "Westphalian region."

During the Republic, the process of community formation and the establishment of large cities, which had begun in 1875 with Münster, continued and expanded, reaching its peak in 1929 with the Law on the communal restructuring of the Rhinish-Westphalian industrial area. A whole series of districts (e.g. Dortmund, Hörde, and Bochum) were abolished and their territory transferred to the neighbouring cities. New territorial arrangements were created for Ennepe-Ruhr-Kreis and the city of Oberhausen. In 1920, the Siedlungsverband Ruhrkohlenbezirk was founded as a communal organisation for all the Ruhr cities.

== Nazi period ==
As in the rest of Germany, the Nazi party was a totally insignificant splinter party in Westphalia in the 1928 election. In Arnsberg, it got only 1.6% of the vote. Over the course of the Great Depression, the party's following greatly increased and, in the 1930 election, their vote in Arnsberg rose to 14%. There were significant differences in their support among different religious groups and social classes. In the March 1933 elections, the Nazi party averaged 44% of the vote across Germany, but only 28.7% in the largely Catholic Münster district, 33.8% in mixed-religion Arnsberg, and 40.7% in mostly Protestant Minden.

The general process of Gleichschaltung or "Nazification" in Westphalia after 1933 did not differ significantly from the rest of Germany. The new government divided the province into two "Gaue" (regional party branches), which were the primary means by which it controlled the region. Although the province continued to exist, the Gau system largely superseded it in practice.

Name	Headquarters	Gauleiter
Westphalia-North	Münster	Alfred Meyer (1931–1945, also Oberpräsident from 1938)
Westphalia-South	Bochum	Josef Wagner (1931–1941); Paul Giesler (1941–1943); Albert Hoffmann (1943–1945)

=== Gleichschaltung (Nazification) ===
Immediately after the Nazi seizure of power, politicians and civil servants who were associated with the Centre Party or the SPD were fired. These included the head of Arnsberg district Max König. Some members of the provincial Landtag and mayors, like Karl Zuhorn in Münster, Curt Heinrich Täger in Herne, and Cuno Raabe in Hagen, were removed because they refused to fly the Nazi flag from the roofs of their town halls. The Landeshauptmann Franz Dieckmann (Centre Party) was fired and replaced with the Nazi Karl-Friedrich Kolbow and the Oberpräsident Johannes Gronowski (Centre Party) was also replaced, with Ferdinand von Lüninck, an unusual appointment, since he had been a Catholic member of the German National People's Party, rather than a Nazi. He joined the Nazi party after his appointment and his non-Nazi background helped to ensure the acceptance of the new regime in Westphalia. He was replaced by Alfred Meyer in 1938.

Numerous party supporters and functionaries (especially from the workers' parties) were arrested and spent time in concentration camps. People in many regions of Westphalia participated in the boycott of Jewish businesses on 1 April. After 1 May 1933, the headquarters of the free labour unions were seized. In Neheim, the local union chief subsequently killed himself. On 10 May 1933, there were book burnings in cities of the provinces, including Münster.

=== Reconciliation and resistance ===
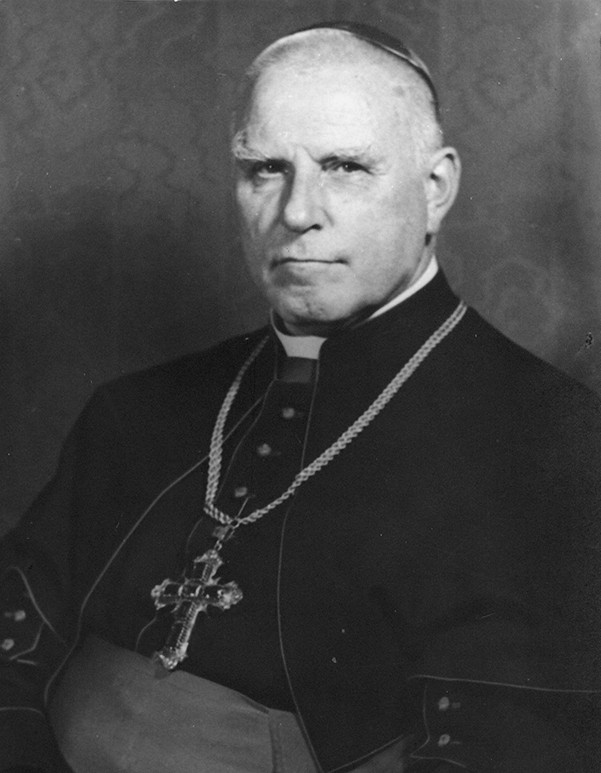
Clemens August Graf von Galen, Bishop of Münster (1933–1945).

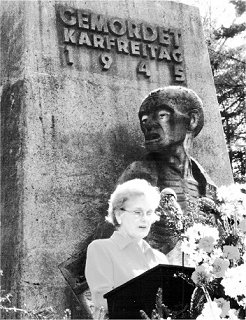
Mahnmal Bittermark memorial for those killed at Bittermark in early 1945.

The majority of the population generally reconciled themselves to the demands of the regime – many of them enthusiastically. The strongest Christian unions in the province hoped to escape from their status as banned free organisations by issuing statements of subservience to the Nazi party and joining the German Labour Front.

The active opponents of Nazism in Westphalia were a small minority. A strong motivation for this was religious membership. Around a thousand Catholic priests were at least temporarily arrested or prosecuted. Some were sent to concentration camps, where at least fifteen died. The dismissal of Oberpräsident Ferdinand Lüninck in 1938 and his later execution in connection with the 20 July plot were religiously motivated. This is also documented by the statement of the jurist Josef Wirmer, who was born in Paderborn and grew up in Warburg, who replied to judge Roland Freisler during the trial before the People's Court, "I am [...] deeply religious and it is because of my religious beliefs that I entered this conspiratorial clique." The sermons by Münster's bishop Clemens August Graf von Galen in opposition to the Nazi euthanasia campaign were known throughout Germany. Protestant priests were also arrested and sent to concentration camps for similar reasons. In general, in the Prussian church province of Westphalia, Protestant churches were enmeshed in the Kirchenkampf between the pro-Nazi "German Christians" and the Confessing Church. Initially, German Christians who were closely associated with the regime won most priestly and synodal elections, but in 1934, a noted member of the Confessing Church, Karl Koch, was elected as the head of the church province.

The resistance of members of the socialist and communist workers' movements was clearly politically motivated. Dortmund was the centre of a communist resistance which continued to renew itself despite arrests. At the beginning of 1945, the Gestapo arrested twenty-eight communists, who were executed in Dortmund's Bittermark forest, along with other detainees and prisoners of war in March and April. Supporters of the SPD were generally less assertive, focussing on maintaining old contacts and exchanging information. Their fragmented organisation meant that the group revolving around Fritz Henßler generally went undetected by the secret police until around 1937.

In Dortmund and other large Westphalian cities, there were also groups of Edelweiss pirates, an informal youth movement which passively and actively resisted the Hitler Youth.

=== Persecution of Jews and euthanasia ===
On Kristallnacht, during and after 9 November 1938, synagogues were burnt and in some places, such as Lünen, Jewish citizens were murdered. Events in Medebach are well documented. As in the rest of Germany, the Jewish community in Westphalia was almost completely destroyed. In Dortmund in 1933, there were around 4,000 Jews, of whom 44 had fallen victim to the various persecutory measures by 1939. Over a thousand died between 1940 and 1945 in concentration camps and another 200 died from exhaustion in the months following the end of the war. Another portion of the Jewish population successfully made it out of the country before 1941. In the whole of Westphalia, the Jewish population sank from around 18,000 in 1933 to a little over 7,000 in 1939. By the beginning of systematic deportation in 1941, the number had fallen to 5,800. Oberpräsident Alfred Meyer participated in the Wannsee Conference in his role as state secretary in the Reich Ministry for the Occupied Eastern Territories. The deportations began in Westphalia on 10 December 1941, with transport from Münsterland. Bielefeld and Arnsberg followed a few days later. By the end of March 1943, there were only around 800 Jews in Westphalia. Most of these were probably protected persons in the context of miscegenation laws and the Geltungsjuden. After the war, only a few of them returned to the region. These included Hans Frankenthal of Schmallenberg, who later wrote about his experiences, and the family of Paul Spiegel (later leader of the Central Council of Jews in Germany).

In hospitals and nursing homes under direct provincial control, the number of dead in the euthanasia programmes was high. Most adult patients were killed outside the province, at the Brandenburg Euthanasia Centre. Mentally disabled children were killed at Nidermarsberg in the Sauerland, in the LWL-Klinik Marsberg. In total, around 3,000 Westphalian patients were involved, of whom around 1,350 have been proven to have been killed at the Hadamar Euthanasia Centre. Including later victims, the total number of Westphalian patients killed is likely to be around three thousand. However, with a few exceptions, the Bethel Foundation managed to prevent the murder of its patients through to 1945.

=== World War II ===
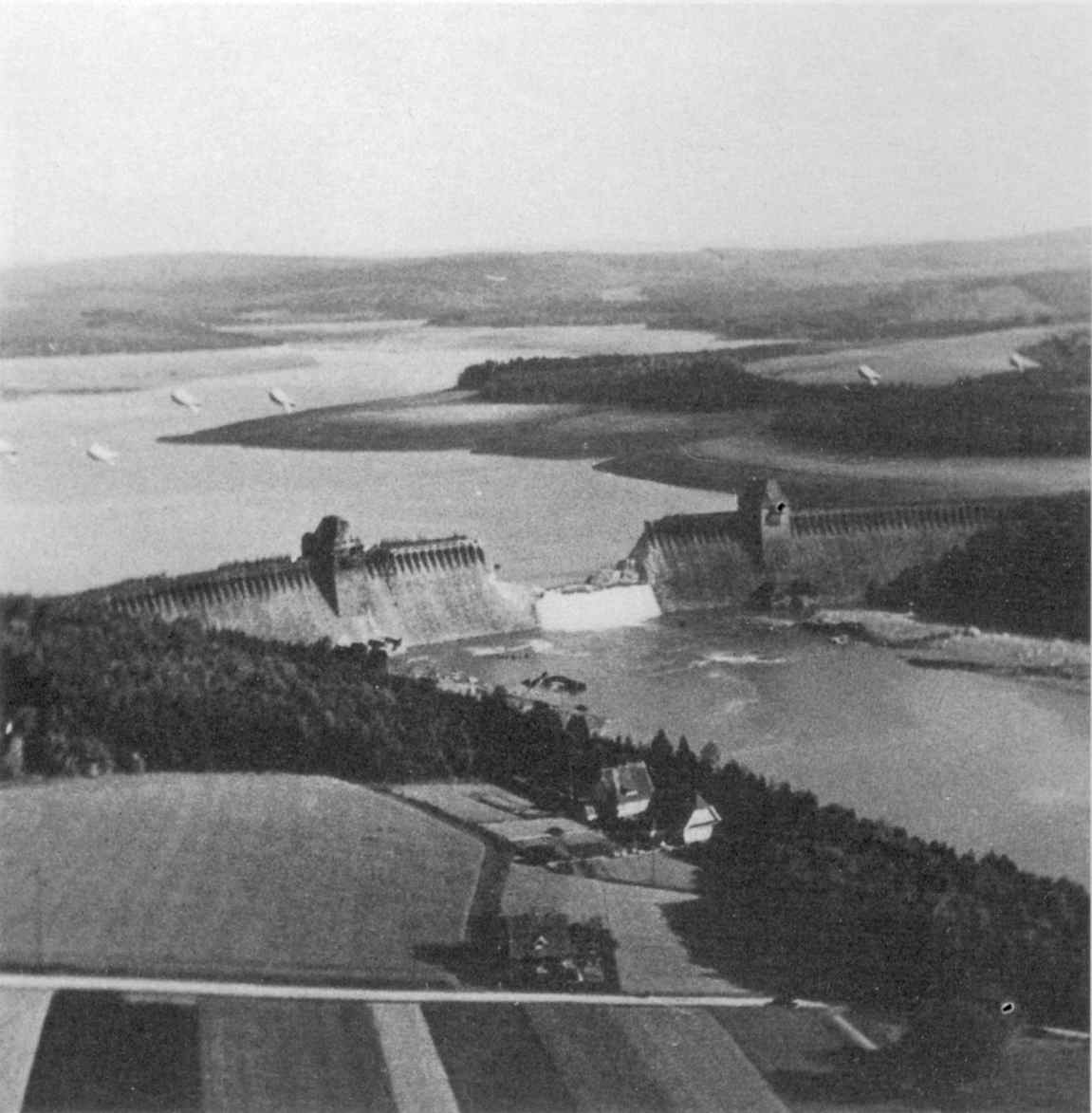
The breached dam of the Möhne Reservoir, May 1943.

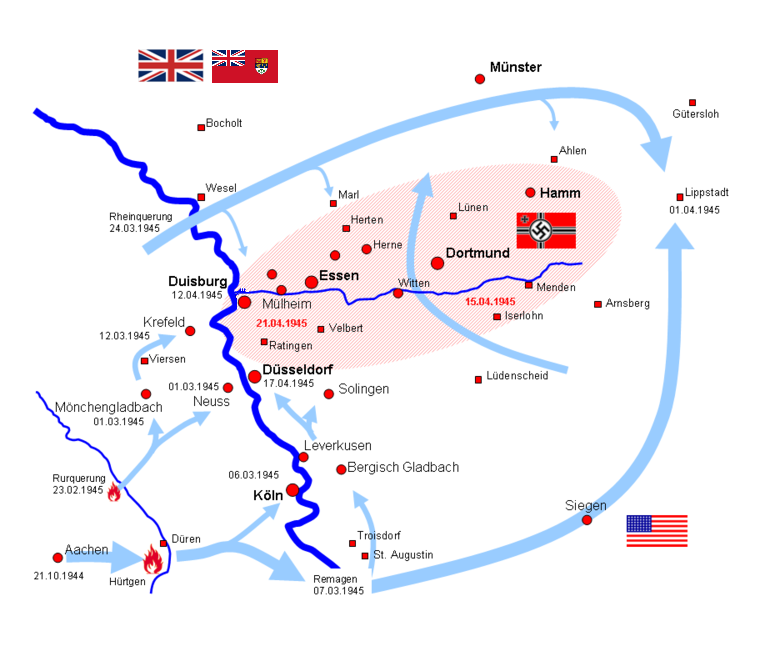
Encirclement of the Ruhr

Aside from the transition to a war economy and the introduction of ration stamps, the employment of prisoners of war and forced labourers in agriculture, factories, and mines was the first major change that the war brought to the province. The largest prisoner of war camps were Stalag VI-K (326 Senne) in Stukenbrock and Stalag VI-A at Hemer, but there were several others in the province. According to some estimates, over 65,000 soldiers, mostly Soviet, died at Stukenbrock alone. There are similar estimates for Hemer, although the officially recorded number of deaths there is lower.

The war touched the civilian population of Westphalia directly for the first time with the bombing of the Ruhr. Münster experienced its first bombing raid in 1940 and the city became the target of severe night-time bombing even before the beginning of widespread bombing in 1941. In total, over a thousand people died in the city as a result of aerial attacks. In Bochum, over four thousand died and only 35% of buildings there survived from 1939 to 1945 unscathed. It was very similar in other cities, not just in the Ruhr and the large cities, but also in marginal areas. The cities of Soest and Meschede, for example, were mostly destroyed, and even small rural settlements like Fredeburg suffered massive damage from Allied bombardment. On the night of 16–17 May 1943, RAF Lancaster Bombers ("The Dambusters") during Operation Chastise breached the dam of the Möhne Reservoir, causing a flood which killed at least 1,579 people. Neheim was particularly hard-hit with over 800 victims, among them at least 526 victims in a camp for Russian women held for forced labour.

Towards the end of March 1945, the ground war also reached the territory between the Rhine and the Weser. There was frequent heavy fighting between German and Allied troops. In the forested area around Winterberg, Medebach, and Schmallenberg, there were infantry battles with heavy casualties over Easter 1945. The opposition proved futile and on 1 April, American troops coming from the south met up with British and Canadian troops coming from the north, encircling the German forces within the Ruhr pocket. German resistance, initially rather determined, dwindled rapidly. During this period, the Nazis carried out various atrocities (known as the Endphaseverbrechen, "end-phase crimes"), such as the Arnsberg Forest massacre at Warstein and Eversberg. The surrender of the last units of the German army on 18 April 1945 marked the end of the Second World War in Westphalia.

== End of the province ==
After the Second World War, the Province of Westphalia was part of the British Occupation Zone. The border with Hesse was also the border between the British and American Occupation Zones, while the Westphalian districts of Siegen and Olpe bordered the French Occupation Zone. The headquarters of the British occupation authority, the "Control Commission for Germany – British Element", was at Bad Oeynhausen until after the Potsdam Conference in August 1945. In July 1945, they appointed Rudolf Amelunxen as the new Oberpräsident of the province. New heads of government were also appointed for Arnsberg (Fritz Fries), Minden and Münster. At the beginning of 1946, a new political assembly, the Provinzialrat ("Provincial Council"), was established to advise the military government and the Oberpräsident. Its members were drawn according to a fixed pattern from a set of parties that had been newly founded or refounded since the end of the war. The SPD had 35 members, the CDU 30, the KPD 20, the Centre 10, and the FDP 5.

The British abolished the Prussian provinces in their zone on 23 August 1946 in accordance with a decision made by the British cabinet in June 1946. Westphalia was merged with the northern portion of the former Rhine province to form North Rhine-Westphalia. In 1947, the Free State of Lippe (capital: Detmold) was merged into North Rhine-Westphalia, becoming part of a newly formed Detmold district that essentially replaced the Minden district. Even before the official abolition of Prussia on 25 February 1947, the province had disappeared from the political stage. After the founding of the Federal Republic of Germany and the passage of the Basic Law on 23 May 1949, North Rhine-Westphalia became one of the states of the new federation.

== List of Oberpräsidents ==
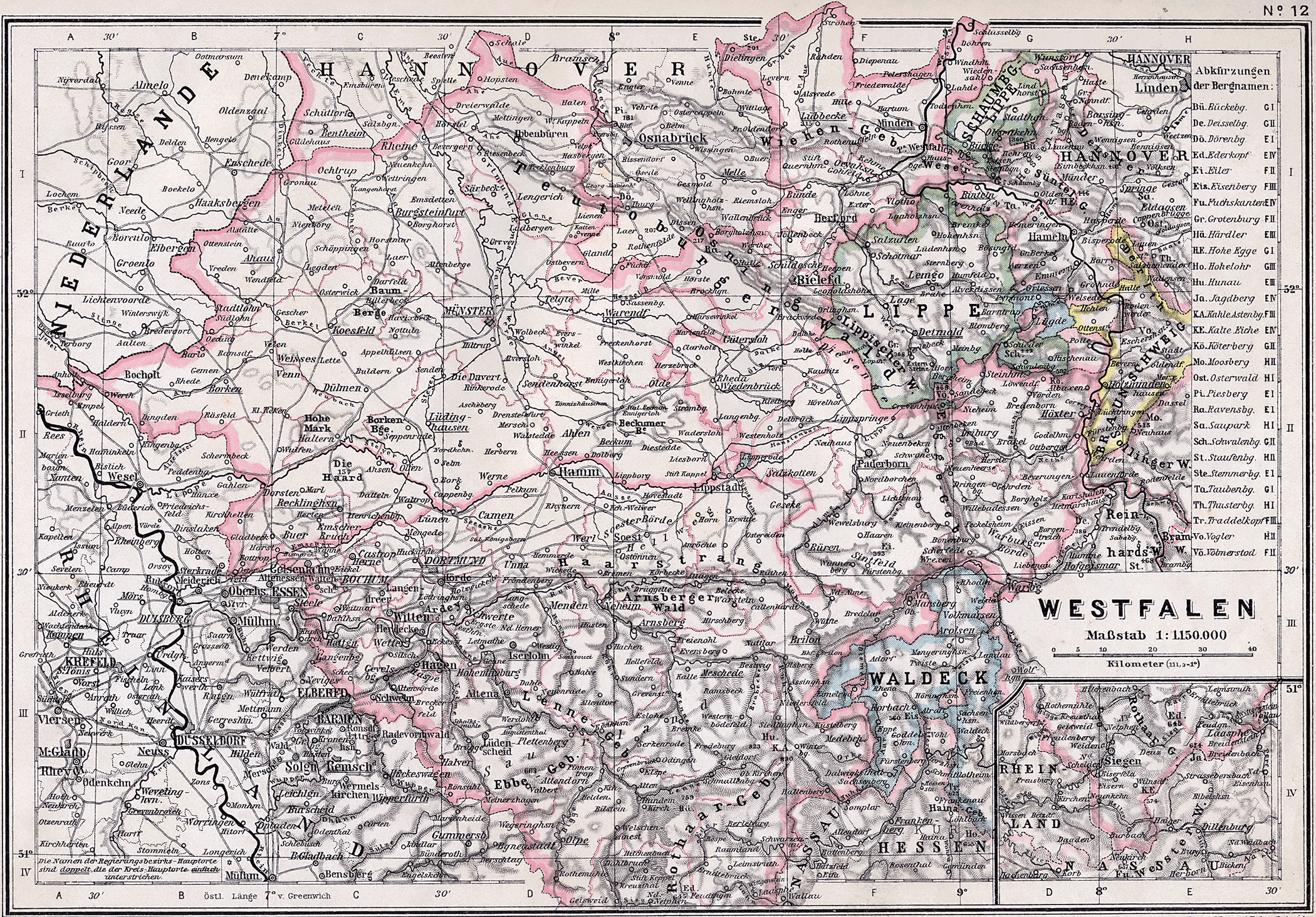
Map of the Province of Westphalia (1905)

The Prussian central government appointed an Oberpräsident (Supreme President) as its representative in each province, supervising the implementation of central prerogatives. Between 1920 and 1933, their appointment needed the consent of the Provinziallandtag (provincial diet), which, in those years directly elected by the Westphalians.

Oberpräsidenten for the Province of Westphalia
Name	Image	Born-Died	Party affiliation	Start of Tenure	End of Tenure
Ludwig von Vincke		1774–1844		1816	1844
Justus Wilhelm Eduard von Schaper		1792–1868		1845	1846
Eduard Heinrich von Flottwell		1786–1865		1846	1850
Franz von Duesberg		1793–1872		1850	1871
Friedrich von Kühlwetter		1809–1882		1871	1882
Robert Eduard von Hagemeister		1827–1902		1883	1889
Heinrich Konrad von Studt		1838–1921		1889	1899
Eberhard von der Recke von der Horst				1899	1911
Karl, Prince of Ratibor and Corvey		1860–1931		1911	1919
Felix Friedrich von Merveldt		1862–1926	DNVP	1919	1919
Bernhard Wuermeling		1854–1937	Centre	1919	1922
Felix Friedrich von Merveldt			DNVP	1922	1922
Johannes Gronowski		1874–1958	Centre	1922	1933
Ferdinand von Lüninck		1888–1944	DNVP	1933	1938
Alfred Meyer		1891–1945	Nazi	1938	1945
Rudolf Amelunxen		1888–1969	Centre	1945	1946

== List of Landeshauptmänner ==
The provincial diet, until 1886 represented by the Westphalian estates of the realm, elected their president titled Landeshauptmann (Provincial Captain). In order to strengthen self-rule in the provinces, the Westphalian provincial diet was reorganised as a legislature composed of representatives elected from the assemblies of the rural counties and independent cities in 1886. These districts and cities then formed a public-law corporation called the provincial federation (Provinzialverband). The elected speaker of the provincial diet, who was initially titled Landesdirektor (Provincial Director), but renamed Landeshauptmann in 1889, was also head of the provincial government, the Provinzialausschuss (Provincial committee). Between 1920 and 1933, the provincial diet was directly elected by the Westphalian electorate. From 1933, in the course of the abolition of parliamentarism in Nazi Germany, the Landeshauptmann was appointed by the central Prussian government, presided over by Hermann Göring, and became subject to the authority of the Öberpräsident. Kolbow was elected in 1933 (by a provincial diet dominated by Nazi representatives), but his successors were appointed and the diet was officially dissolved in 1934. The task of the Westphalian provincial federation is carried on by the Regional Federation of Westphalia-Lippe, which was established in 1953 and also includes the territory of the former Free State of Lippe, which was disestablished in 1947.

Landeshauptmänner for the Province of Westphalia
Name	Image	Born-Died	Party affiliation	Start of Tenure	End of Tenure
August Overweg,		1836–1909		1886	1900
Ludwig Holle		1855–1909		1900	1905
Wilhelm Hammerschmid		1859–1924		1905	1919
Franz Dieckmann		1874–1944	Centre	1920	1933
Karl-Friedrich Kolbow		1899–1945	Nazi	1933	1944
Theodor Fründt		1897–1984	Nazi	1944	1944
Hans von Helms			Nazi	1944	1945
Bernhard Salzmann		1886–1959	None	1945	1954

== Bibliography ==
- Hans-Joachim Behr: Rheinland, Westfalen und Preußen in ihrem gegenseitigen Verhältnis 1815–1945. In: Westfälische Zeitschrift 133/1983, p. 37ff.
- Ralf Blank: Kriegsendphase und „Heimatfront“ in Westfalen. In: Westfälische Forschungen 55 (2005), pp. 361–421.
- Detlef Briesen et al., Gesellschafts- und Wirtschaftsgeschichte Rheinlands und Westfalens. Köln 1995, ISBN 3-17-013320-9.
- Gustav Engel: Politische Geschichte Westfalens. Köln 1968.
- Jürgen Herres, Bärbel Holtz: Rheinland und Westfalen als preußische Provinzen (1814–1888). In: Georg Mölich, Veit Veltzke, Bernd Walter (ed.): Rheinland, Westfalen und Preußen – eine Beziehungsgeschichte. Aschendorff-Verlag, Münster 2011, ISBN 978-3-402-12793-3, pp. 113–208.
- Harm Klueting: Geschichte Westfalens. Das Land zwischen Rhein und Weser vom 8. bis zum 20. Jahrhundert. Paderborn 1998, ISBN 3-89710-050-9.
- Friedrich Keinemann: Westfalen im Zeitalter der Restauration und der Julirevolution 1815–1833. Quellen zur Entwicklung der Wirtschaft, zur materiellen Lage der Bevölkerung und zum Erscheinungsbild der Volksstimmung. Münster 1987.
- Wilhelm Kohl: Kleine Westfälische Geschichte. Düsseldorf 1994, ISBN 3-491-34231-7.
- Wilhelm Kohl (ed.): Westfälische Geschichte. Bd. 2: Das 19. und 20. Jahrhundert. Politik und Kultur. Düsseldorf 1983, ISBN 3-590-34212-9.
  Hans-Joachim Behr: Die Provinz Westfalen und das Land Lippe 1813–1933. pp. 45–165, Alfred Hartlieb von Wallthor: Die landschaftliche Selbstverwaltung. pp. 165–210, Bernd Hey: Die nationalsozialistische Zeit. pp. 211–268, Karl Teppe: Zwischen Besatzungsregime und politischer Neuordnung. pp. 269–341.
- Nordrhein-Westfalen. Landesgeschichte im Lexikon. Red. Anselm Faust et al., Düsseldorf 1993, ISBN 3-491-34230-9.
- Armin Nolzen: Die westfälische NSDAP im „Dritten Reich“. In: Westfälische Forschungen 55 (2005), pp. 423–469.
- Wilfried Reinighaus, Horst Conrad (ed.): Für Freiheit und Recht. Westfalen und Lippe in der Revolution 1848/1849. Münster 1999, ISBN 3-402-05382-9
  Horst Conrad: Westfalen im Vormärz, pp. 5–13, Wilfried Reininghaus: Sozial- und wirtschaftsgeschichtliche Aspekte des Vormärz in Westfalen und Lippe, pp. 14–21, Ders., Axel Eilts: Fünfzehn Revolutionsmonate. Die Provinz Westfalen vom März 1848 bis Mai 1849, pp. 32–73.
- Wilhelm Ribhegge: Preussen im Westen. Kampf um den Parlamentarismus in Rheinland und Westfalen. Münster, 2008 (Sonderausgabe für die Landeszentrale für politische Bildung NRW)
- Karl Teppe, Michael Epkenhans: Westfalen und Preußen. Integration und Regionalismus. Paderborn 1991, ISBN 3-506-79575-9.
  Michael Epkenhans: Westfälisches Bürgertum, preußische Verfassungsfrage und Nationalstaatsgedanke 1830–1871.
- Veit Veltzke: Rheinland und Westfalen: „Reichslande“ im wilhelminischen Kaiserreich (1888–1918). In: Georg Mölich, Veit Veltzke, Bernd Walter (ed.): Rheinland, Westfalen und Preußen – eine Beziehungsgeschichte. Aschendorff-Verlag, Münster 2011, pp. 209–287.
- Alfred Hartlieb von Wallthor: Die Eingliederung Westfalens in den preußischen Staat. In: Peter Baumgart (ed.): Expansion und Integration. Zur Eingliederung neugewonnener Gebiete in den preußischen Staat. Köln 1984, p. 227ff.
- 200 Jahre Westfalen-Jetzt! Katalog zur Ausstellung der Stadt Dortmund, des Landschaftsverbandes Westfalen-Lippe und des Westfälischen Heimatbundes. Münster 2015.
- Kirchen-Ordnung für die evangelischen Gemeinden der Provinz Westphalen und der Rhein-Provinz. Bädeker, Koblenz 1835 (Digitized)
