= Botanischer Garten Rombergpark =

Park in North Rhine-Westphalia, Germany

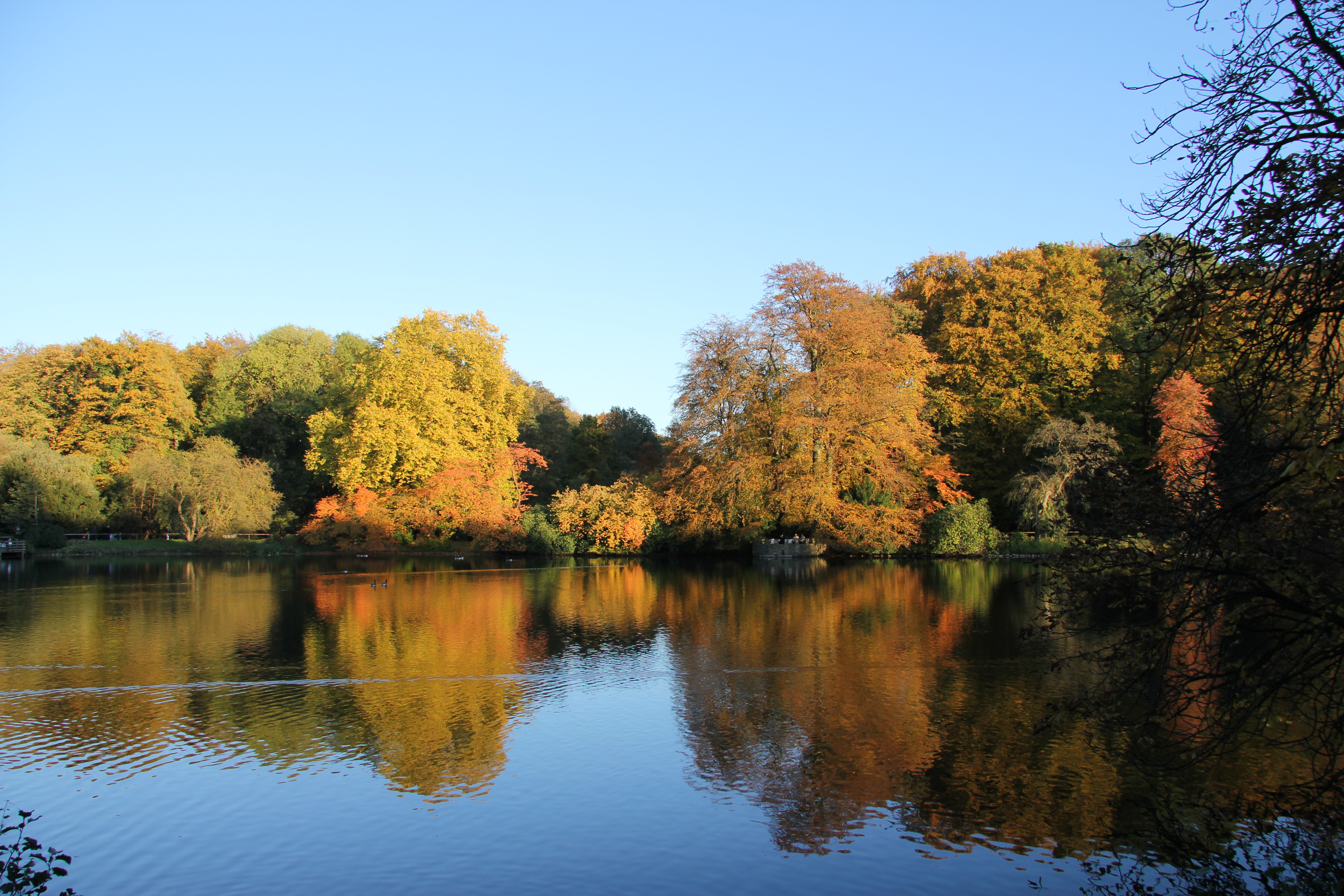
- Lake in Rombergpark
- Interactive map of Botanischer Garten Rombergpark
- Location: Dortmund, North Rhine-Westphalia, Germany
- Coordinates: 51.4807°N 7.4684°E
- Established: 1926; 100 years ago
- Operator: Dortmund

Botanischer Garten Rombergpark (Rombergpark Botanical Garden), or informally Rombergpark, is an extensive municipal botanical garden and arboretum in Dortmund, North Rhine-Westphalia, Germany. With its total area of 68 hectares the Rombergpark is one of the largest botanical gardens in the world. It is always freely open.

== History ==
The garden was established in 1822 as the Romberg family's English landscape park around their mooted castle Brünninghausen (Schloss Brünninghausen). It followed remodeling the house from 1817 in Classicist style, designed by August Reinking. The owner, Gisbert von Romberg I and his family commissioned a new garden concept around the house, carried out between 1817 and 1824 in English landscape garden style. It was designed, beginning in 1818, by Maximilian Friedrich Weyhe, who was court gardener in Düsseldorf. He had worked with Reinking before. The design is extant, held by the Abteilung Westfalen of the Landesarchiv NRW. Weyhe visited the site twice per year to inspect the work, to determine trails and the lake with an island, a bridge and the Bastei which remains. The leading gardener was Jakob Greiß, who later became director of the municipal gardens in Cologne. The building within the park were designed by architect Adolf von Vagedes, who continued Reinking's after his death in 1819, and te Stroet.

The property is located in the south of the city, adjacent to the zoo. In 1926, it was acquired by the city, which transferred its botanical garden from close to the inner city to the larger property. With city planning director Richard Nose, it was enhanced by a small herb garden.

The park was badly damaged by bombing in 1944 during World War II, and the castle was destroyed. In 1945, shortly before the end of the war, officers of the Gestapo murdered almost 300 people in the Rombergpark and the nearby forest Stadtwald Bittermark. The victims were mostly forced labourers and prisoners of war from several European countries, as well as previously imprisoned opponents of the Nazi regime. These events are commemorated today at the Mahnmal Bittermark, and by a memorial plaque at the park, which is planted with white roses, alluding to the Weiße Rose resistance to the Nazis.

Beginning in 1950, director Gerd Krüssmann rebuilt the park as an arboretum, adding some 4500 species. Four greenhouses were built in 1958, with an integrated cafe. A garden of medicinal plants was added in 1985.

Today the garden contains a historic English landscape park with monuments, an arboretum containing thousands of species of woody plants, including some of the largest trees of some species in North Rhine-Westphalia, a terrace with palm trees, and four greenhouses with a total area of 1000 m^{2} for cactus and succulents, ferns, tropical plants, and camellias, jasmine, and lemons. A large lake is home for fish, turtles and water fowl. A smaller lake is surrounded by water cypress. The lakes are fed by "red" creeks rich in iron minerals. A linden alley was planted in 1888. The blooming of rhododendrons is an annual attraction.

The greenhouses with the cafe, and the park as a whole are listed monuments.

== Gallery ==
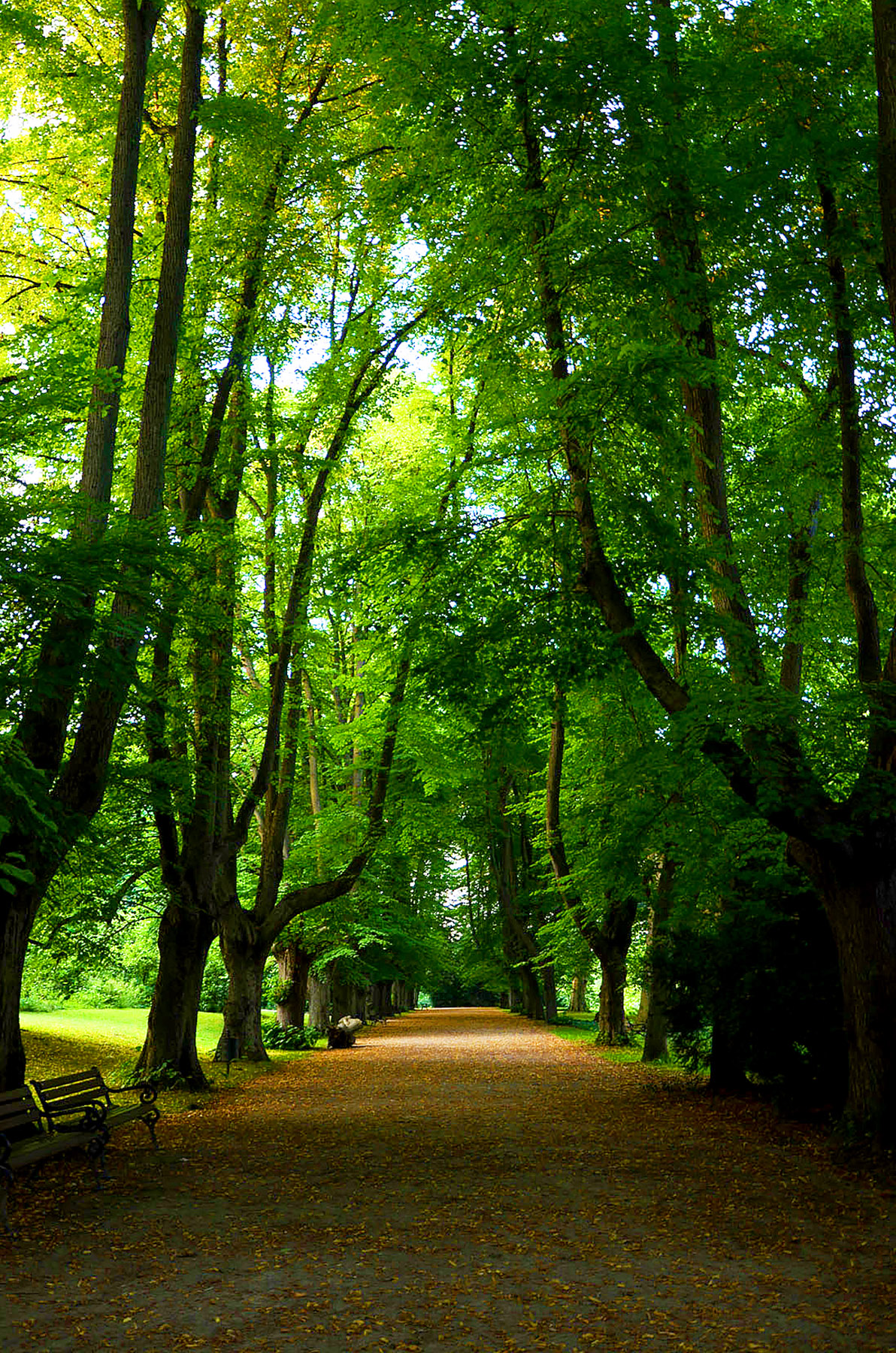
Linden alley in 2014

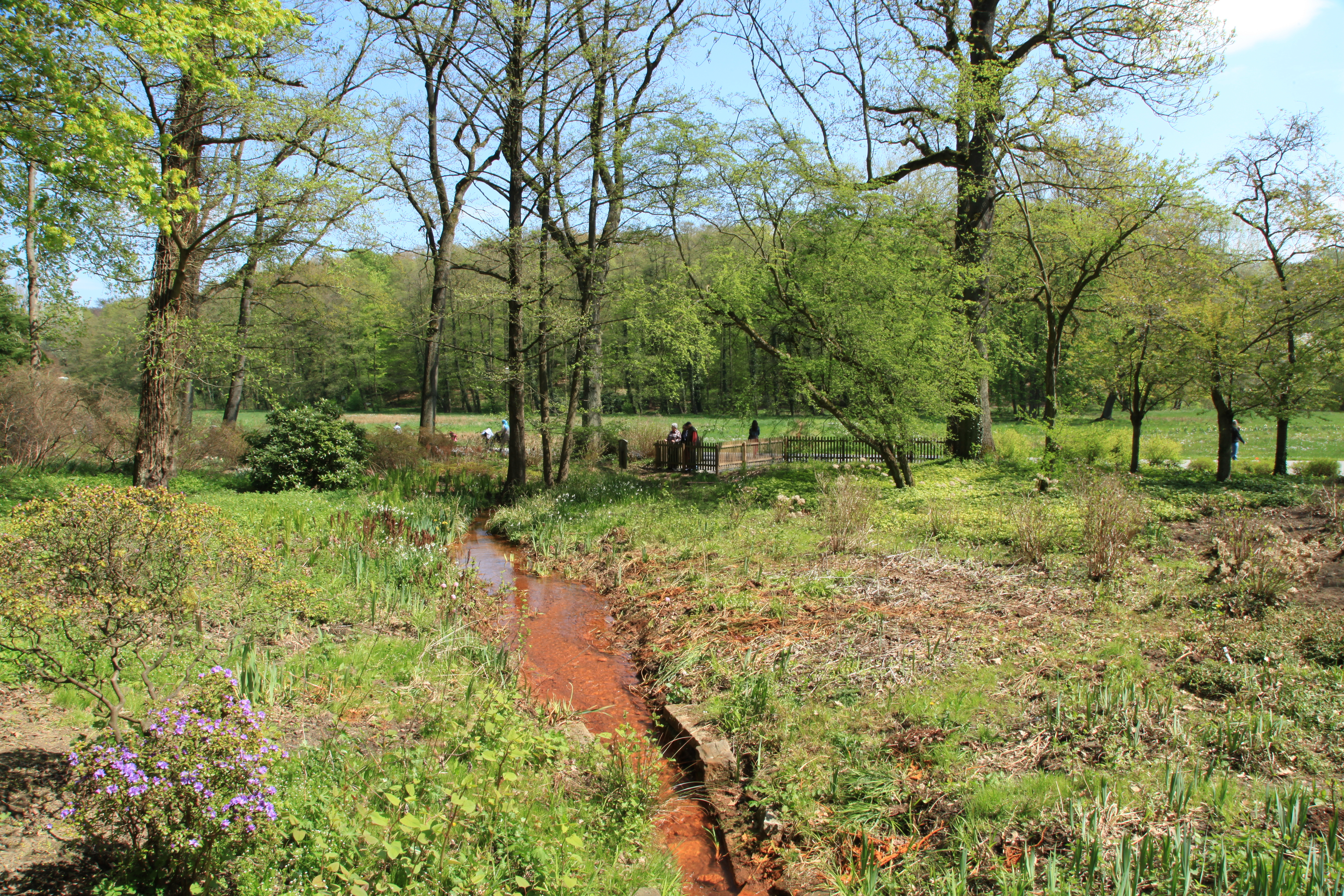
Rombergsiepen, one of the red creeks

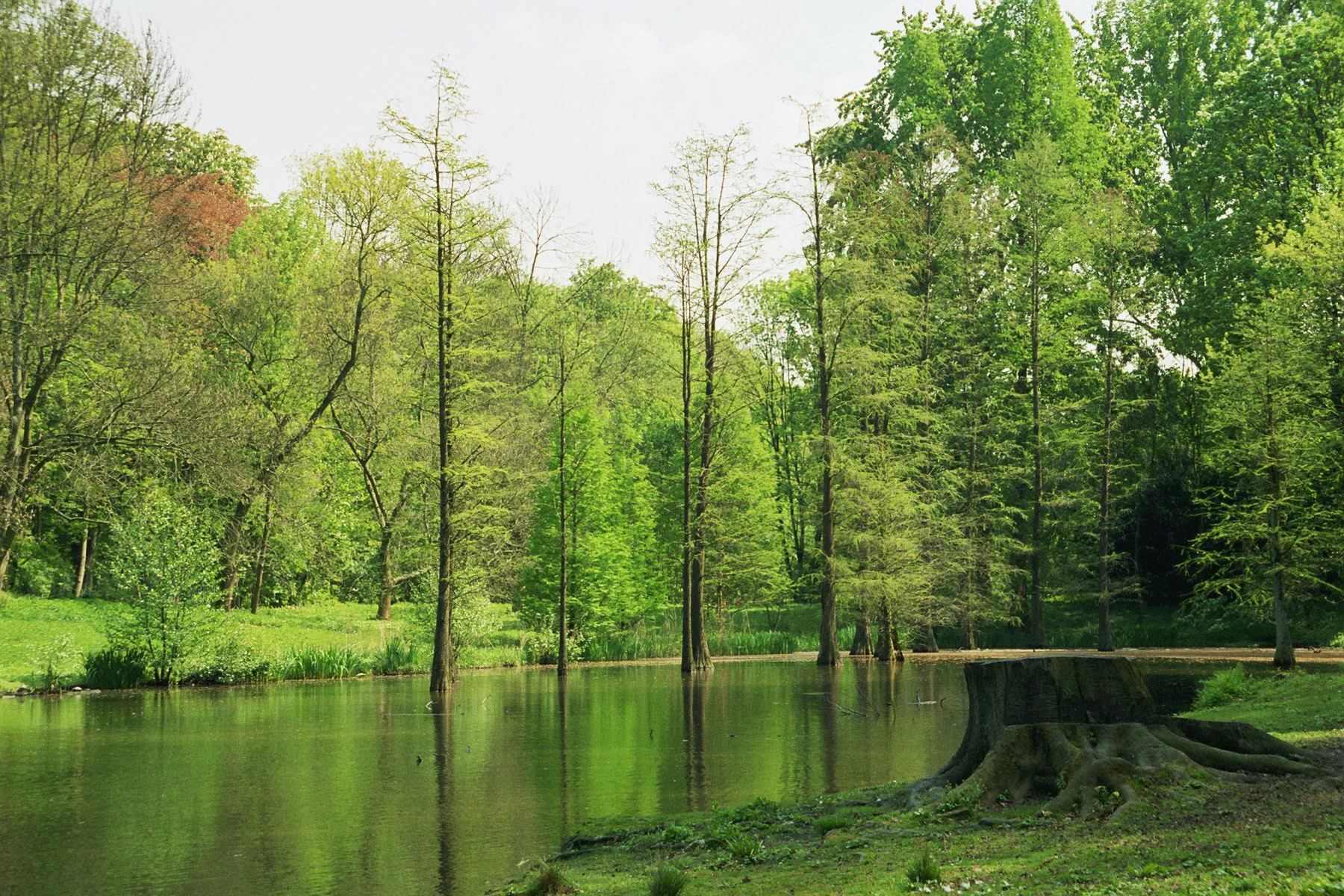
Water cypress at the small lake

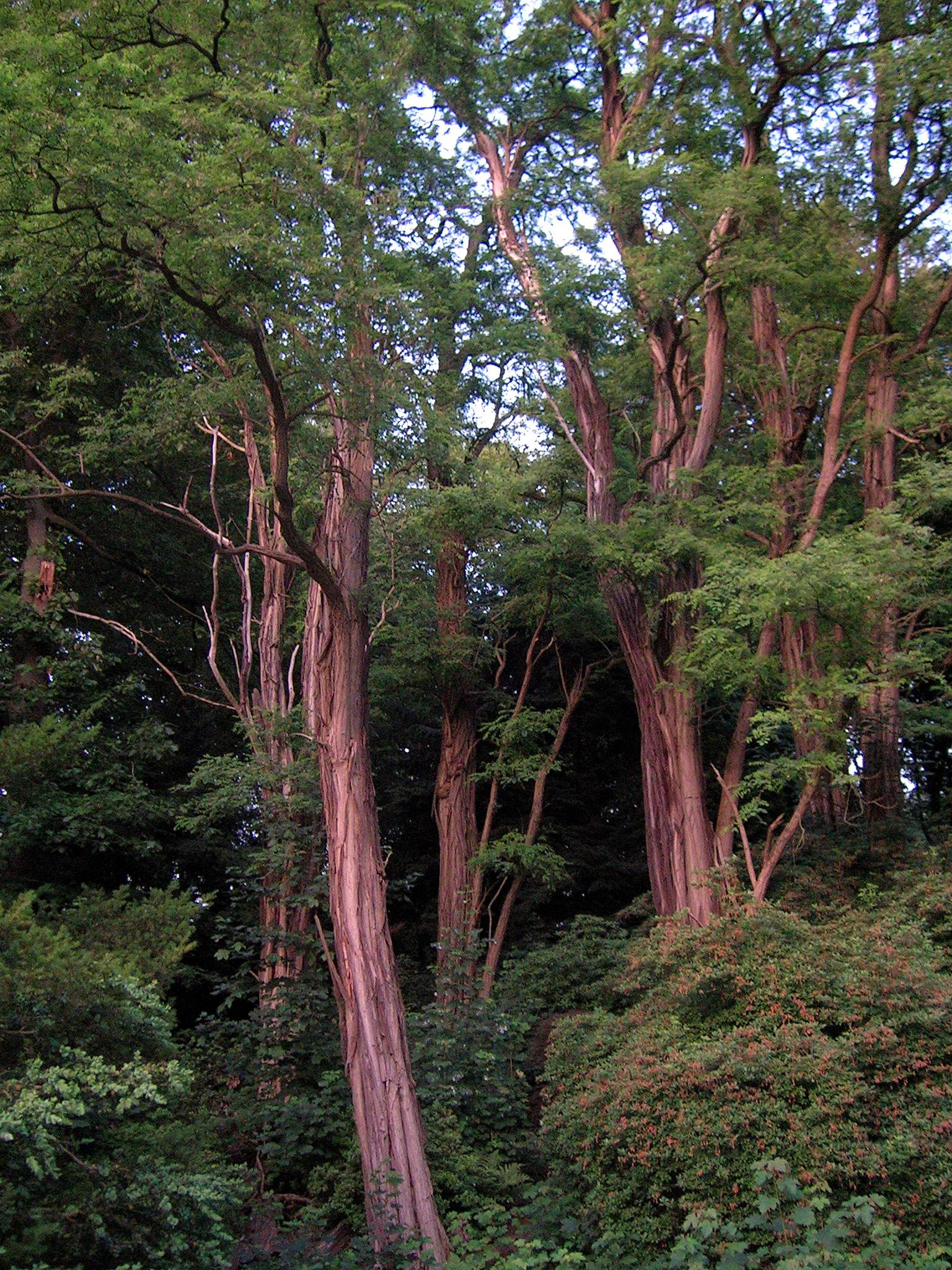
Trees in the swamp garden
