= Carl Wilhelm Tölcke =

German politician (1817–1893)

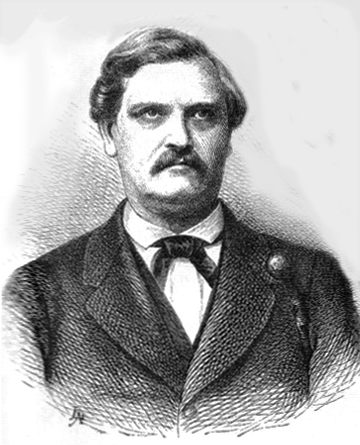

Personal details
- Born: 31 May 1817
- Died: 30 November 1893 (aged 76)

Carl Wilhelm Tölcke (31 May 1817 in Eslohe, Sauerland – 30 November 1893 in Dortmund) was a German Social democratic politician, the "father of Social democracy in Westphalia" and president of the General German Workers' Association.

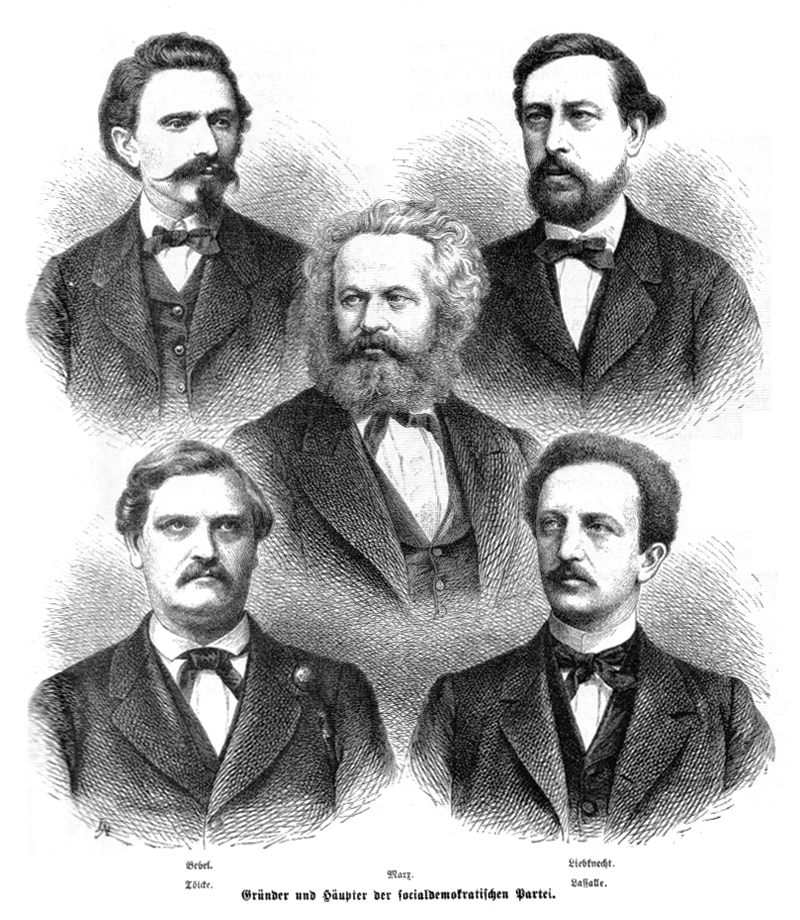
Leaders of the early German worker's movement (above: August Bebel, Wilhelm Liebknecht, in the center: Karl Marx, below: Carl Wilhelm Tölcke, Ferdinand Lassalle)

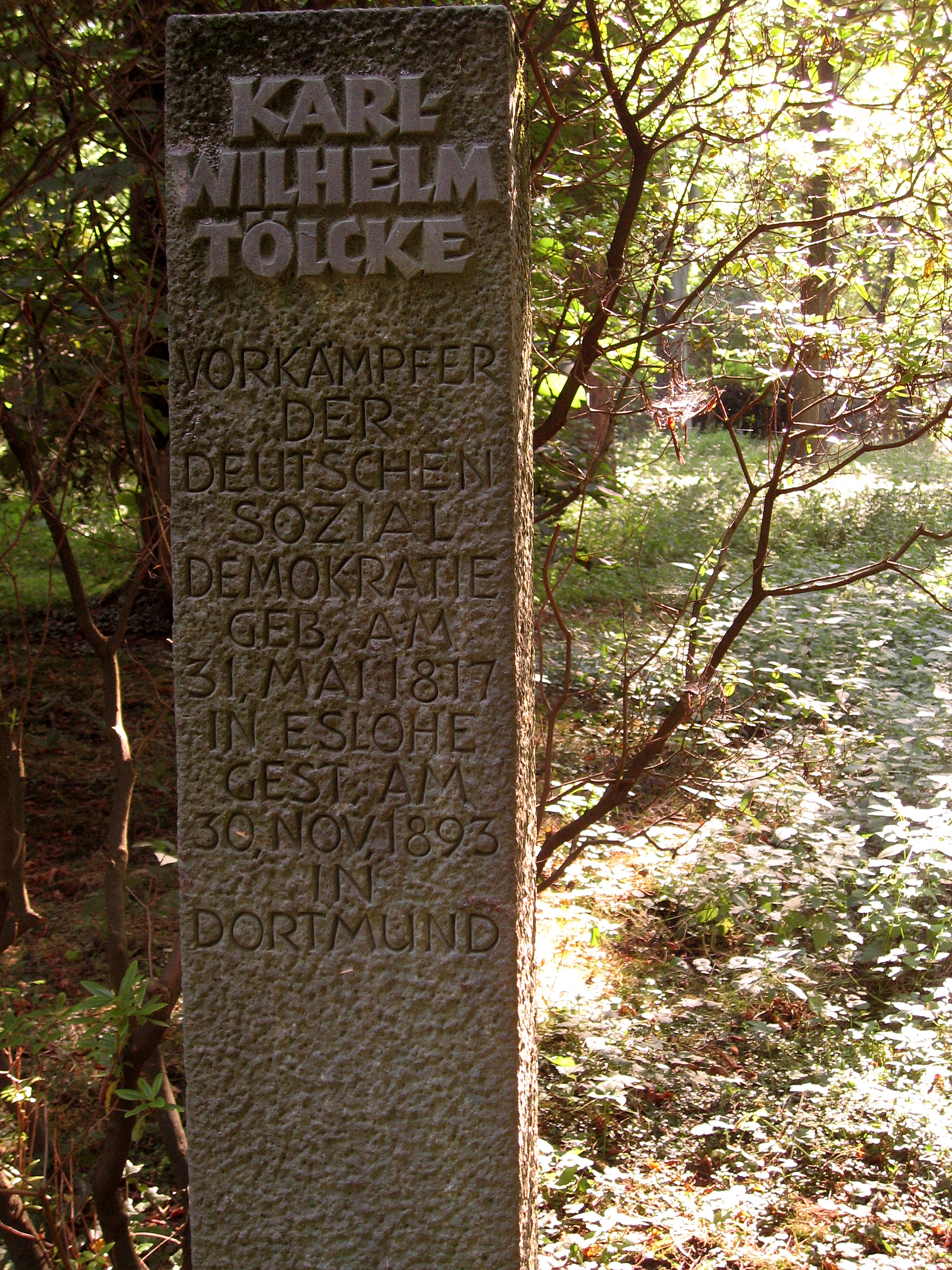
Memorial stone at the Ostenfriedhof in Dortmund
