= Mahnmal Bittermark =

Memorial in Dortmund

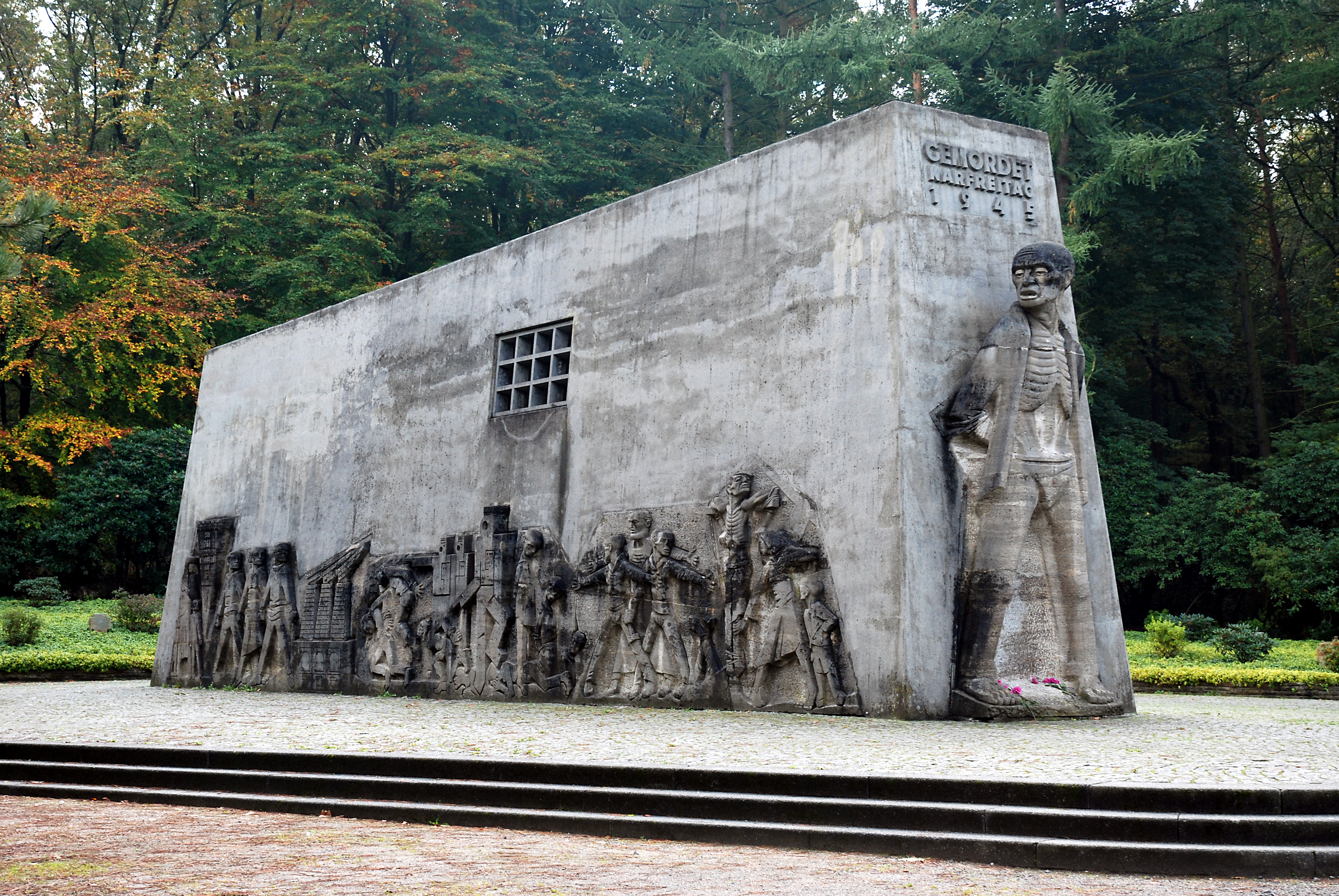
- Mahnmal Bittermark, September 2006
- Location: Bittermark
- Coordinates: 51.4481°N 7.4789°E
- Type: Memorial
- Opening date: 1960
- Dedicated to: About 300 people killed by the Gestapo in Bittermark city forest and in the Rombergpark between March 7 and April 12, 1945

The Mahnmal Bittermark is a memorial place in Bittermark, a borough in the city of Dortmund, Germany.

The place commemorates about 300 people killed by the Gestapo in Bittermark city forest and in the Rombergpark between March 7 and April 12, 1945. The people killed were forced laborers from France, Belgium, the Netherlands, Yugoslavia, Poland and the Soviet Union, members of the German resistance, as well as ordinary people whose careless utterance was judged to be "the dissemination of the opinion about the futility of the war and the insult of Hitler".

The bodies were exhumed on April 19–21, 1945, six days after the US army had taken Dortmund. In 1953 the city of Dortmund approved plans of constructing a memorial place for the victims. Works began in 1955 and were finished in 1960.
