= Friedrich Harkort =

German industrialist (1793–1880)

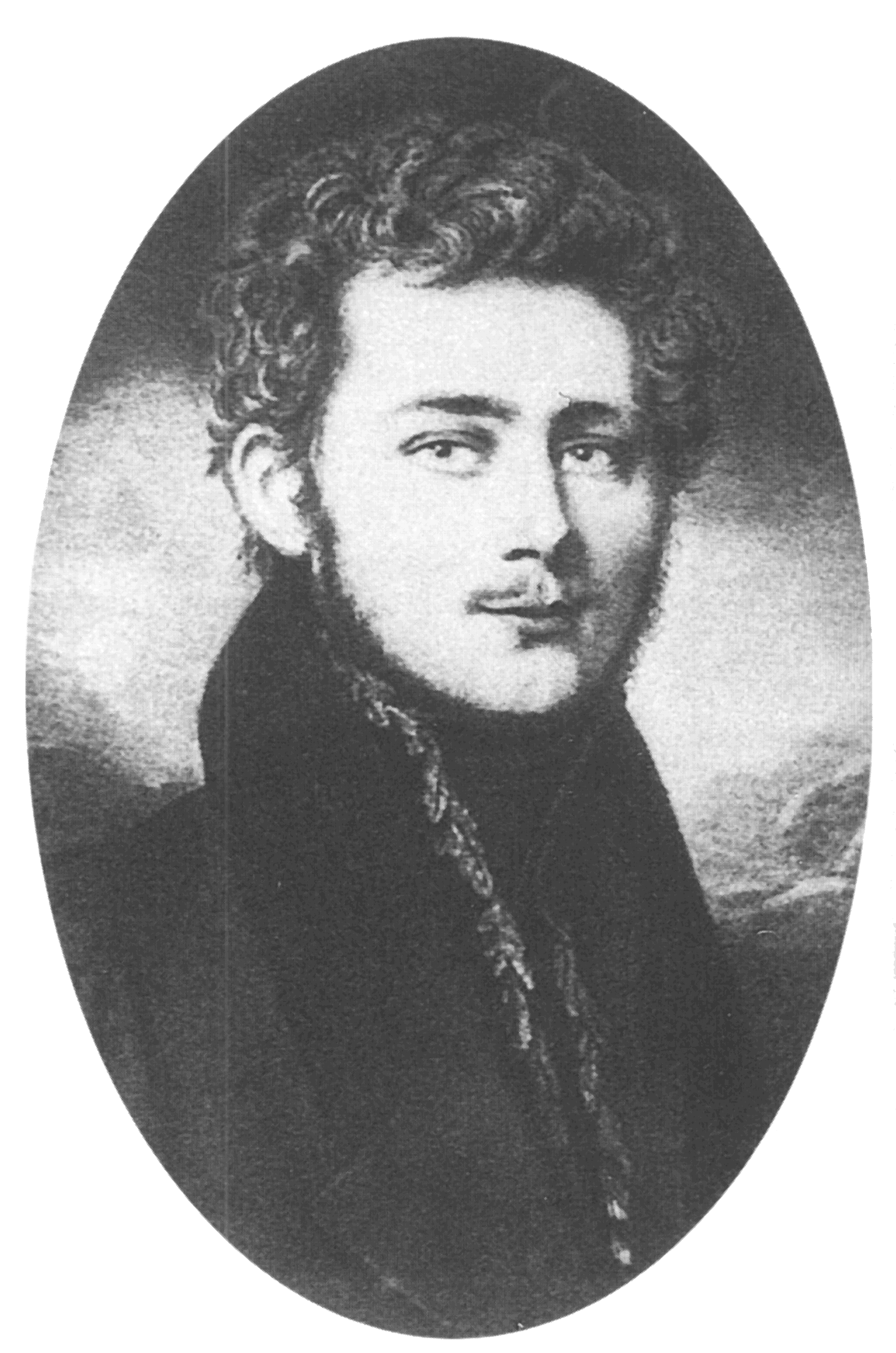
Friedrich Harkort in 1820

Friedrich Harkort (February 22, 1793, Hagen - March 6, 1880), known as the "Father of the Ruhr," was an early prominent German industrialist and pioneer of industrial development in the Ruhr region.

In 1819, he founded the first industrial workshop at Castle Wetter. An early proponent of railroads, he proposed the construction of a railway line from Cologne to Minden in 1825, which eventuated as the Cologne-Minden trunk line, completed in 1847. In 1826 he built a small test track, as a monorail following a design of the Englishman Henry Robinson Palmer.
