= Vincke =

Vincke or von Vincke is a surname. Notable people with the surname include:

- Georg von Vincke (1811–1875), Prussian politician, officer, landowner and aristocrat of the Vincke family
- Gerald Lee Vincke (born 1964), American prelate of the Roman Catholic Church
- Karl von Vincke (1800–1869), Prussian officer and politician
- Ludwig von Vincke (1774–1844), Prussian politician
- Swen Vincke (born 1972), Belgian video game designer, founder of Larian Studios

== See also ==
- Finke (disambiguation)
