= Klusenberg =

Mountain in Germany

- Location within North Rhine-Westphalia

Highest point
- Elevation: 254.33 m above sea level (NHN) (834.4 ft)
- Listing: Highest elevation in the borough of Dortmund
- Coordinates: 51°25′20″N 7°28′15″E

Geography
- Location: North Rhine-Westphalia, Germany
- Parent range: Ardey Hills

The Klusenberg (German pronunciation: [ˈkluːzn̩bɛʁk]) is, at 254.33 m above NHN, the highest elevation on the territory of the city of Dortmund.

The Klusenberg part of the Ardey Hills lies west of the Hohensyburg. To the south its slopes fall away into the Hengsteysee lake. The Klusenberg is wooded with just a few residential houses.
