= Wannebach (Ruhr, Westhofen) =

River in Germany

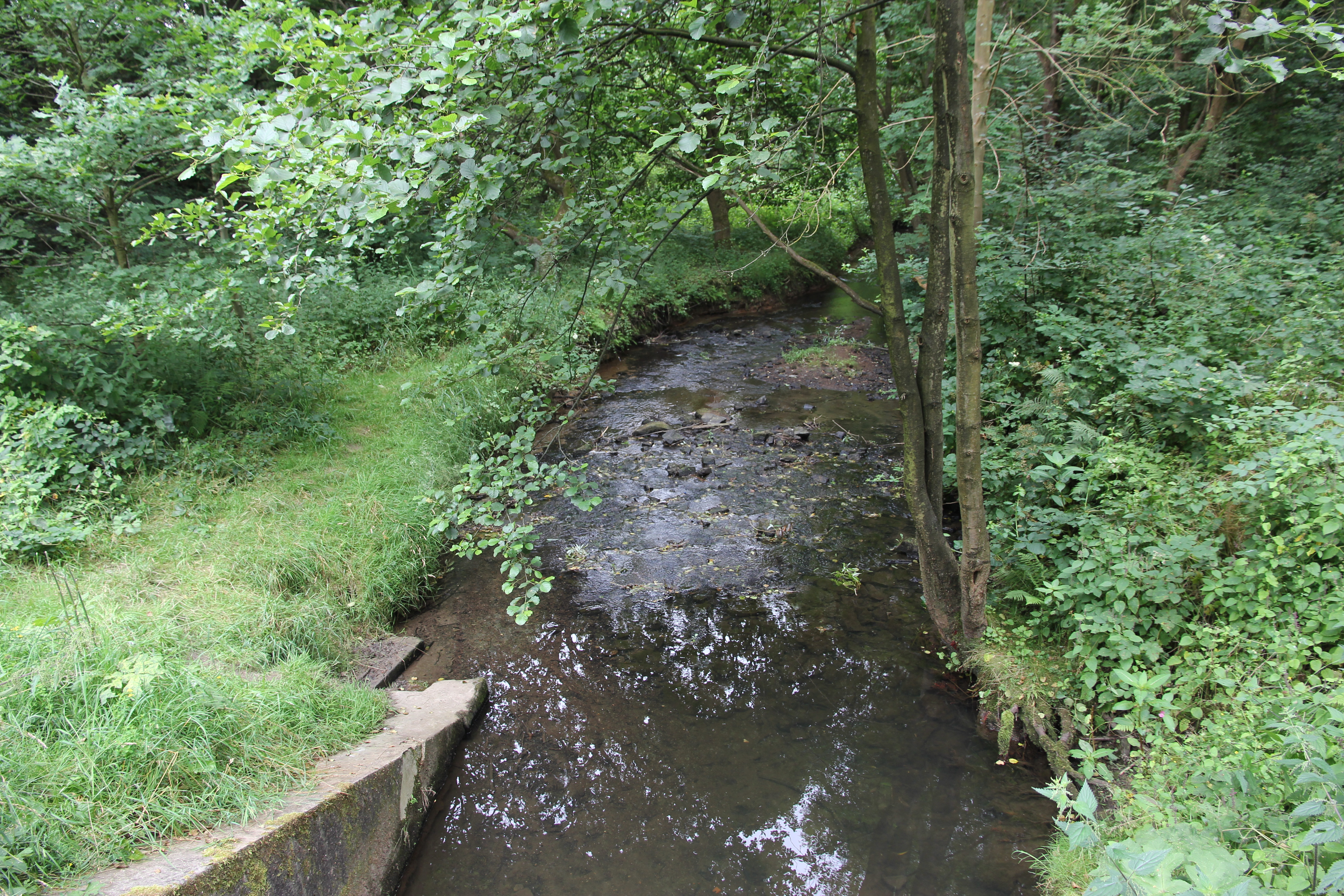

Location
- Country: Germany
- State: North Rhine-Westphalia

Physical characteristics
- Mouth
  - location: Ruhr
  - coordinates: 51.4180°N 7.5475°E
- Length: 8.2 km (5.1 mi)

Basin features
- Progression: Ruhr→ Rhine→ North Sea

Wannebach is a small river of North Rhine-Westphalia, Germany. It is right tributary of the Ruhr. Its source is near Dortmund-Syburg, north of the Hengsteysee. It joins the Ruhr near Schwerte-Westhofen, about 900 m downstream from the other Wannebach.

== See also ==
- List of rivers of North Rhine-Westphalia
