= Husen Castle =

Husen Castle may refer to the following castle sites in Germany:

- Husen Castle (Hausach), ruined castle above Hausach in the Black Forest, Baden-Wurttemberg
- Husen Castle (Syburg), tower house of a former castle in Westphalia
