= Ardey Hills =

Hill range in North Rhine-Westphalia, Germany

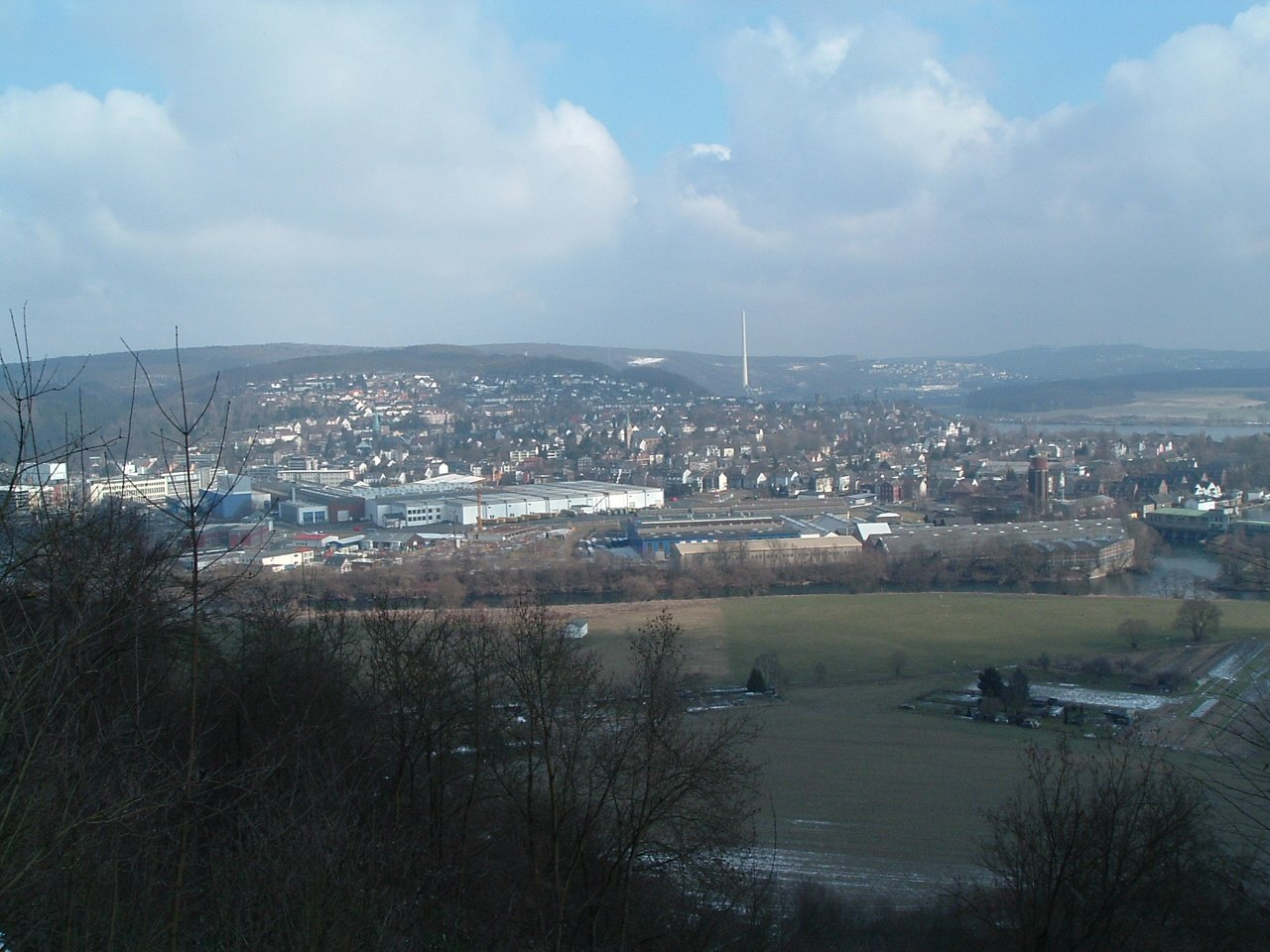
- Ardeygebirge: view from the south near Wetter and Herdecke

Highest point
- Peak: Auf dem Heil
- Elevation: 273.8 m above NN
- Listing: Hills of North Rhine-Westphalia

Geography
- Location within North Rhine-Westphalia
- Country: Germany
- State: North Rhine-Westphalia
- Range coordinates: 51°24′15″N 7°23′35″E
- Parent range: Rhenish Massif, Berg-Mark Hills

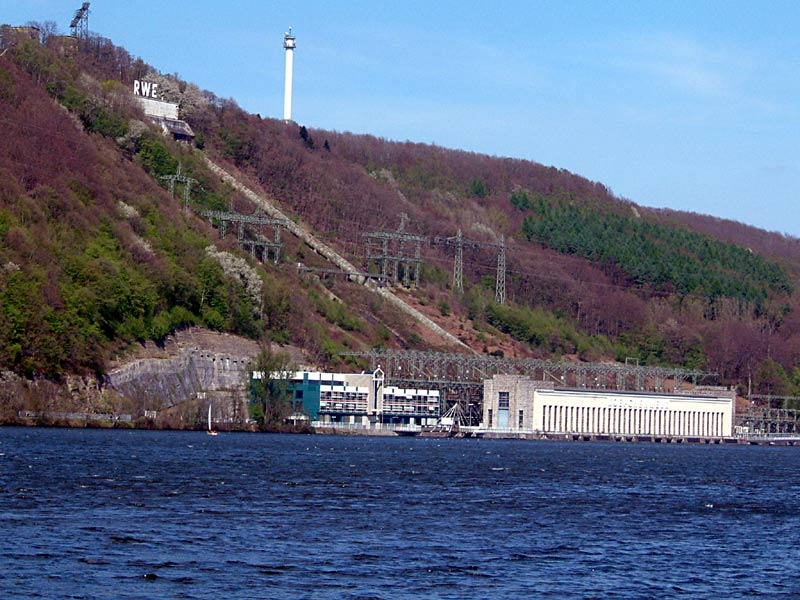
The Koepchenwerk hydropower station on the slopes of the Ardey above the Ruhr, with the Hengsteysee in Herdecke

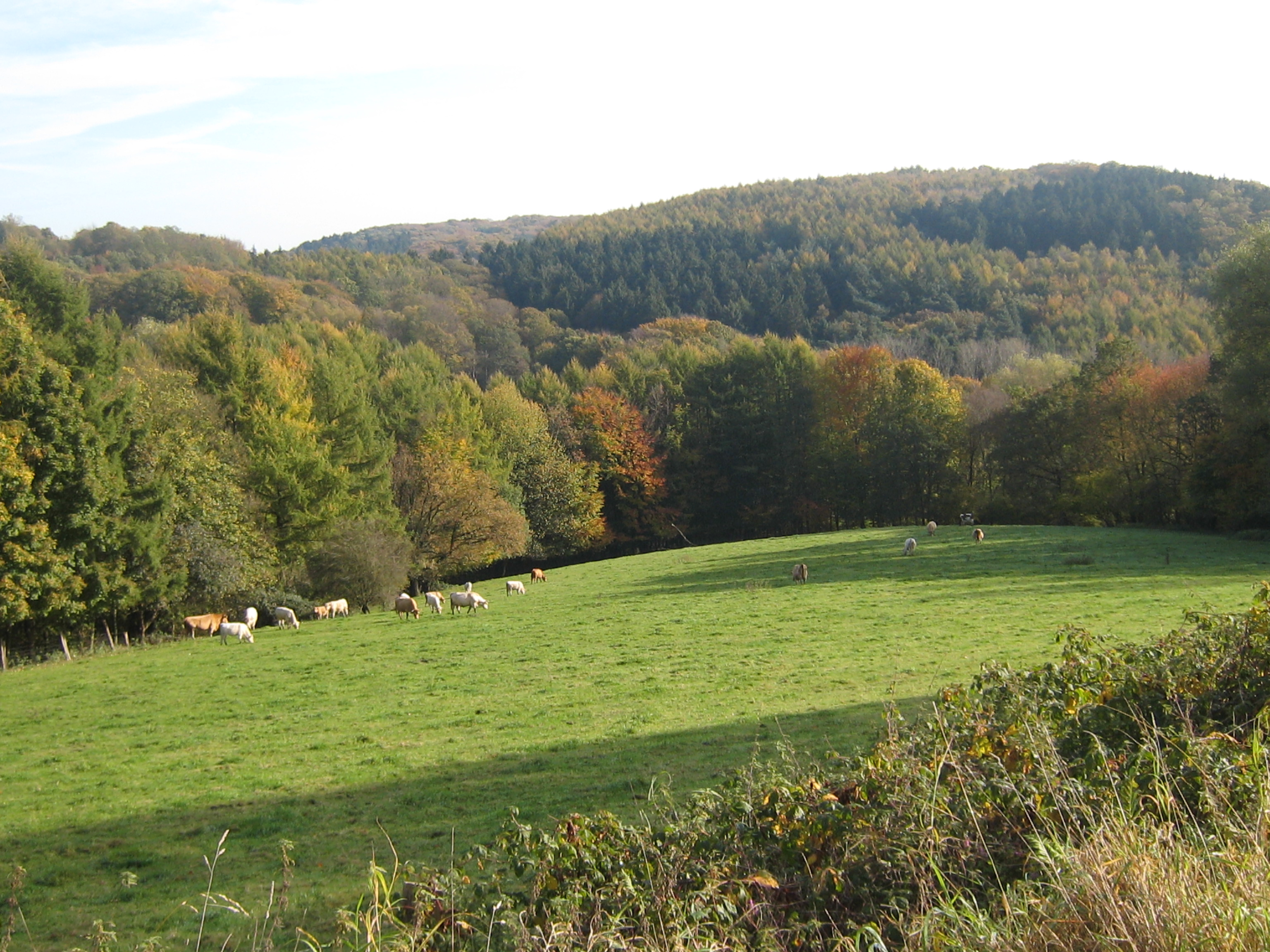
The Ebberg between Schwerte and Syburg

The Ardey Hills (German: Ardeygebirge or Ardey) are a range of wooded hills, up to 273.8 m above sea level (NN), in the territory of the city of Dortmund and the districts of Ennepe-Ruhr-Kreis and Unna in the German state of North Rhine-Westphalia. The hills form part of the eastern Rhenish Massif and, to a lesser extent, to the Berg-Mark Hills (Bergisch-Märkisches Hügelland).

== Geography ==
=== Location ===
The Ardey Hills, together with the Haarstrang, run from east to west, separating two major natural units: the Westphalian Lowland including the Emscher Depression and Hellwegbörde in the north from the Süder Uplands and lower Sauerland in the south, the Ardey being counted as part of the Süder Uplands and the Haarstrang the Westphalian Lowland.

From a topographical perspective, the Ardey Hills are the western foothills of the sparsely wooded and mainly agricultural Haarstrang. However it is different, not only from a cultural landscape point of view, but also geologically (a decisive factor being the carboniferous boundary near the surface).

In the north, on the territory of the city of Dortmund, the Ardey Hills descend gradually into the plain of the Westphalian Lowland in the area of Münsterland. To the south and west they are bounded by the River Ruhr, their rugged slopes often dropping steeply into its valley. On those slopes the point where there is the maximum 165.2 m height difference, from the upper storage basin (ca. 261.5 m above NN) to the Hengsteysee (96.3 m above NN), is used by the pumped-storage power station of Koepchenwerk in Herdecke to generate electricity from hydropower.

=== Settlements ===
The following cities and towns are located in or at the Ardey Hills along the Ruhr − from east-northeast to west-southwest −: Fröndenberg, Unna, Holzwickede, Schwerte, Dortmund, Herdecke, Wetter and Witten.

=== Elevations ===
The highest point in the Ardey Hills is the long ridge of Auf dem Heil, which rises in the territory of Herdecke west of the town itself. This and the other high points in the Ardey are shown below in order of height (m) above sea level (NN):

- Auf dem Heil (273.8 m), Herdecke
- Klusenberg (254.3 m), Dortmund-Syburg
- Ahlenberg (247.5 m), Herdecke
- Wartenberg (246.1 m), Witten
- Syberg (245.4 m), Dortmund-Syburg
- Harkortberg (231.5 m), Wetter
- Ebberg (222.3 m), Schwerte
- Rehberg (197.9 m), Herdecke
- Hohenstein (ca. 146 m), Witten

== Geology and history ==
Predominantly acidophilous sandstone and clay (argillaceous shales) as well as grauwackes from the Carboniferous form the geological base of the Ardey Hills. They are the source of the Ruhr Sandstone which is extracted in large quarries. The Ardey and Haarstrang together were on the edge of the northern ice sheet from the last ice age.

== Landscape ==
Along the Ruhr the Ardey has a decidedly hilly character with large height differences, steep, rocky slopes and deep V-shaped valleys. Seen from the north and east the Ardey Hills have a gentler appearance. Here there are gently curved hilltops covered in woods and meadows. Due to its proximity to the city of Dortmund and town of Witten the northern edge of the hills is a popular residential area and, as a result, densely populated.

The ridges (Eggen or "edges") of the Ardey are covered by beech woods. Its slopes are incised by the V-shaped valleys of small streams, known as Seipen and divided into small landscape units. The Ardey Hills are an old cultural landscape. Traces of historic woodland usages like coppicing, wood pasture and charcoal burning may still be found in many places today.

== Walking ==
A particularly attractive section of the Ruhr Ridgeway (Ruhrhöhenweg) maintained by the Sauerland Mountain Club (Sauerländischer Gebirgsverein) runs along the heights of the Ardey Hills from the source of the Ruhr to its confluence. The path has many viewing points especially in the Ruhr valley. The Westphalian Way (Westfalenweg) also runs over the Ardey Hills.
