= Syberg =

Mountain in Germany

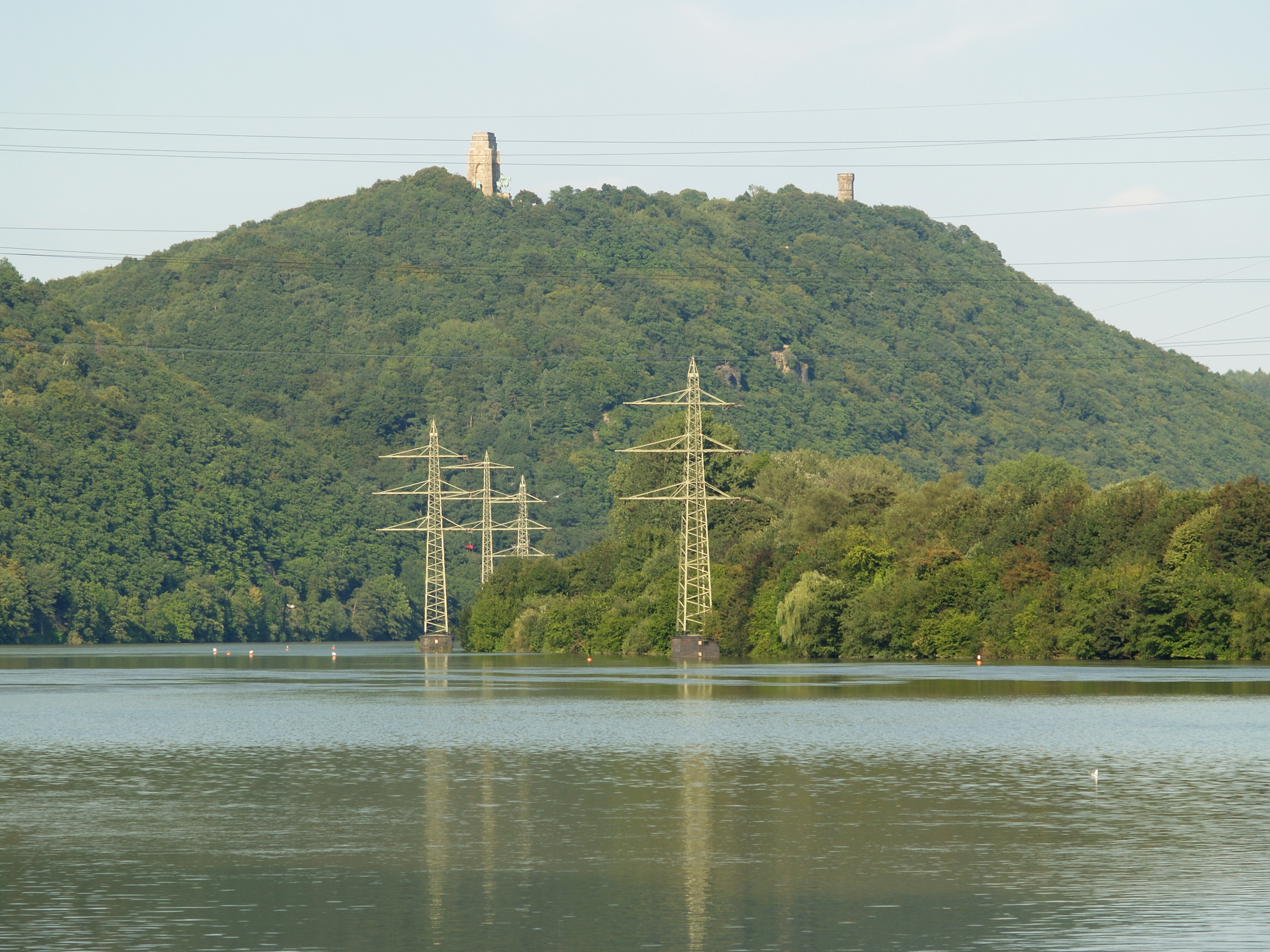
- The Syberg above the Hengstey lake

Highest point
- Elevation: 242 m above sea level (NN) (802.6 ft)
- Coordinates: 51°25′13″N 7°29′09″E

Geography
- Location within North Rhine-Westphalia
- Location: Dortmund, North Rhine-Westphalia, Germany
- Parent range: Ardey Hills

The Syberg is a hill in the Ruhr in the southern part of Dortmund, 240 m above sea level (NN), which is part of the Ardey Hills. The Syberg is home to the Sigiburg, the Vincke Tower, a monument to Emperor William I and other points of interest.

The family name of the House of Syberg is derived from the Syberg.

== Geology, mining, nature reserve ==
The Syberg is part of the Ardey Hills, and was formed of sandstone and slate of the Namurian, a stratigraphic unit of the Carboniferous. The sandstone (Ruhrsandstein) is of high resistance, and was widely used as building material in the region; some quarries are yet visible in the area.

The slopes of the Ruhr and its tributaries were the first locations of coal mining in the Ruhr region. The first documents of coal mining in the Syberg date from 1580. Regular mining ended at the end of the 19th century, but during the Occupation of the Ruhr in 1923 and in the crisis after World War II illegal mining took place. Adits and pinges are yet visible, and a mining path (Syburger Bergbauweg) is established.

The steep slopes to the Ruhr on the southern face of the Syberg are a valuable nature conservation area with its forests of oaks, beeches and hornbeam. The area is one of two refugia of the common wall lizard in North Rhine-Westphalia.

== Historical sites ==
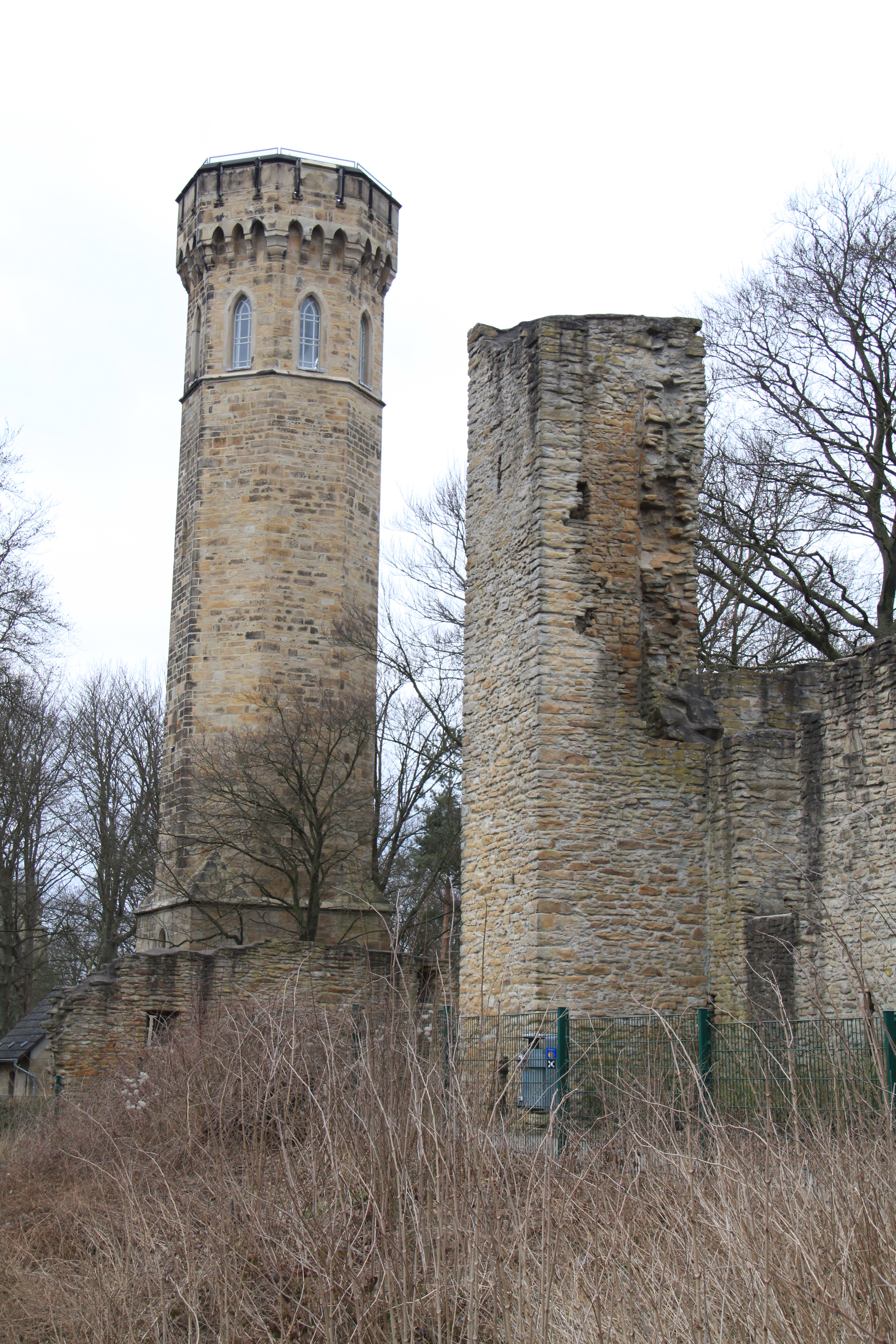
Vincke tower (1882) and Hohensyburg ruins

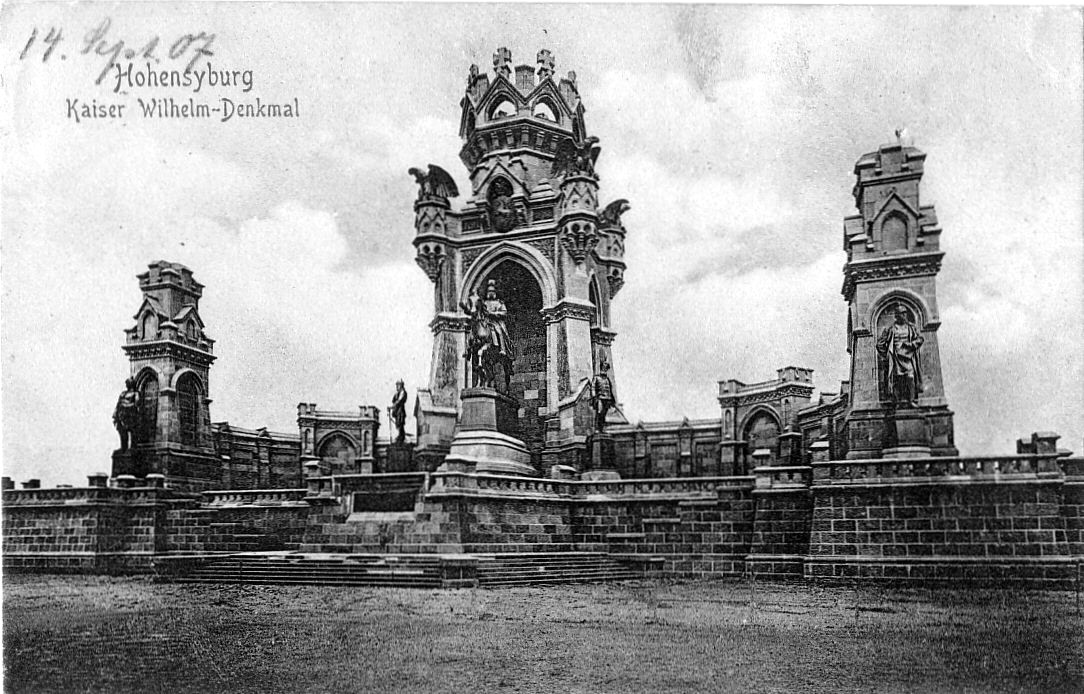
Emperor William monument (construction of 1902)

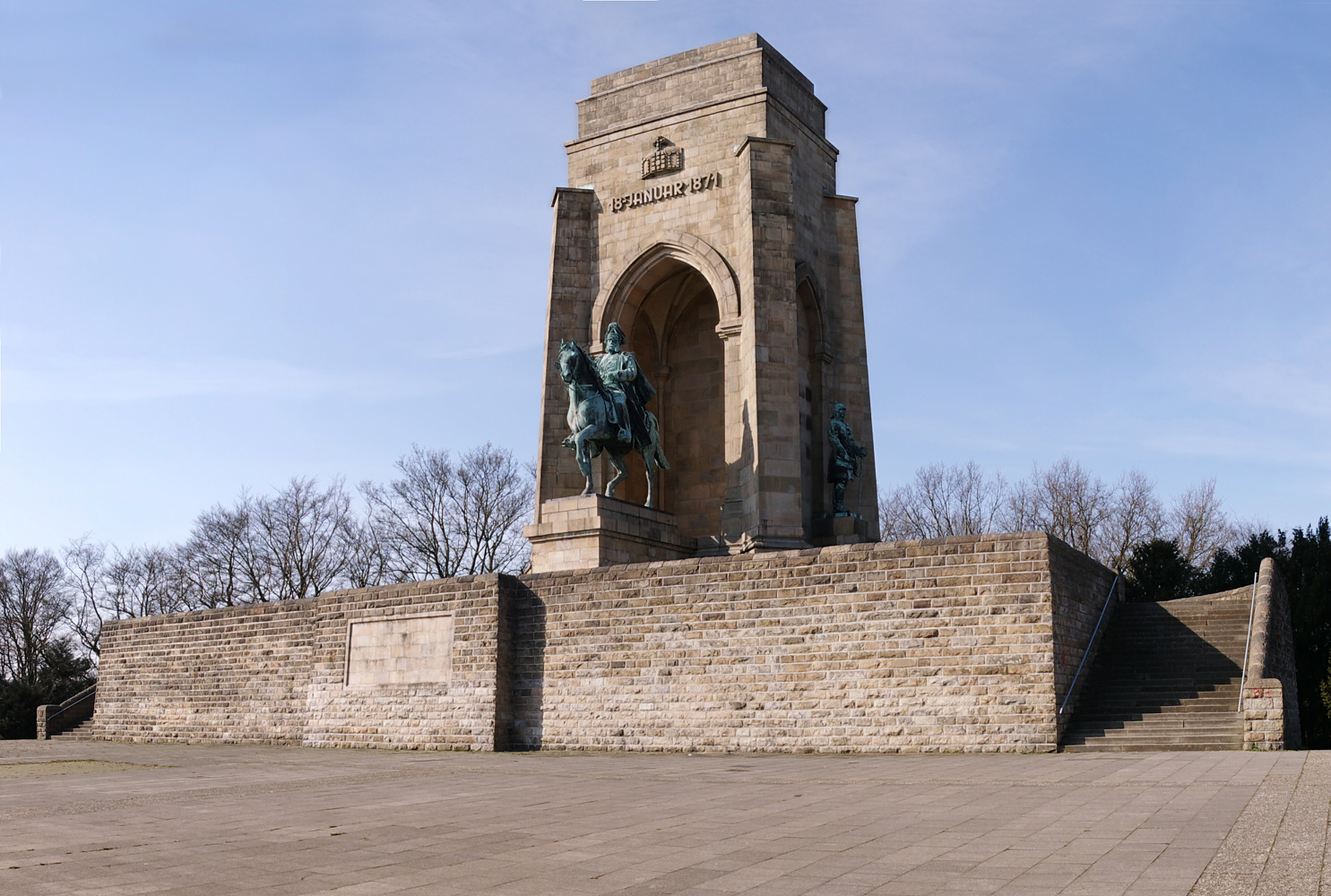
Emperor William monument (since 1935)

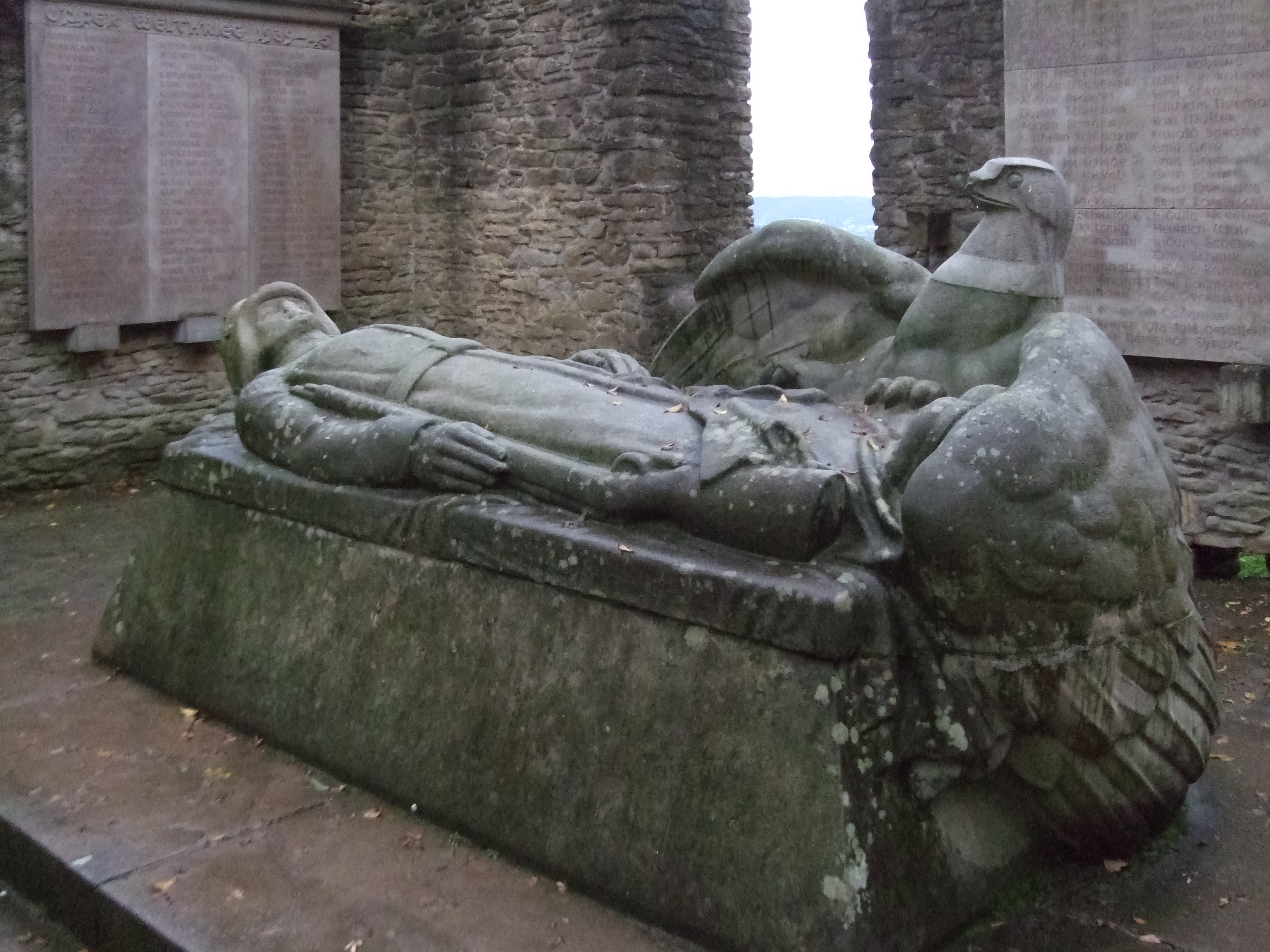
War momorial (1930)

=== Prehistory ===
The oldest relicts of human presence on the Syberg are from the Neolithic and Bronze Age. Some mints of Roman occupation time were found.

=== Sigiburg ===
Syberg became a historical location during the Saxon Wars, when Charlemagne captured a hillfort on top of the hill named "Sigiburg" in 775 AD; two years later the Saxons failed with a reconquest of Sigiburg. In historical tradition the Sigiburg is marked as of Saxon origin, but there are no real proofs for this opinion.

=== Hohensyburg ===
In the High Middle Ages this region got under control of the Archbishop of Cologne, who established a hill castle on the Syberg since 1150. The Lords of Syberg (Herren von Syberg) were the first ministerials mentioned. Since about 1300 the County of Mark got the loan power. The castle was finally destroyed in the 16th and 17th century.

=== Church ===
A church of romanesque origin from 1169 became spiritual centre of the small settlement Syburg. The church was destroyed by bomb raid in World War II and rebuilt in former style. During post-war excavations relicts of a previous Carolingian church came to light. It is very doubtful, whether this church had been sacrificed by Pope Leo III in 799, as a medieval legend told.

=== Peter's source ===
The Pope Leo legend also refers to the Peter's font (Petersbrunnen), first mentioned in 1427. The speculation of an origin as prehistorical sanctuary is extremely doubtful.

=== Vincke tower ===
Close to the ruins of the Hohensyburg the Vincke tower (Vincketurm) in neogothic style was erected (total height: 26 m (85 ft)) in 1857 and renewed in 1882 in honour of Ludwig von Vincke, the first Supreme president of the Prussian Province of Westphalia. Vincke had a special relation to this place, for his first wife Eleonore von Syberg was a descendant of the Lords of Syberg and owner of the castle ruins.

In 1945, the Vincke tower was an observation point of the German artillery, and was hit by shells of the Allies.

=== Emperor William monument ===
The monument for German Emperor Wilhelm I (1797–1888) (Kaiser-Wilhelm-Denkmal) by Hubert Oswald Stier is one of a great amount of similar national monuments, that were built in the quarter century from his death to the beginning of World War I. In 1889 the Province of Westphalia decided to build such a monument and discussed several proposals for location. A place above the Weser river at the Porta Westfalica gorge won the race against the Syberg with a small majority. Despite this great disappointment, the monument on the Syberg was built nevertheless, completely financed by private efforts and inaugurated in 1902. The eclecticistic monument was decorated with an equestrian statue of Emperor William I and two statues of Chancellor Otto von Bismarck and Supreme Commander Helmuth von Moltke by Adolf von Donndorf. His son Karl Donndorf created the two statues of the successful army leaders Prince Frederic William and Prince Friedrich Karl in the German Wars of Unification; both of them were removed in 1935, when the construction was substantially changed following the ideals of Nazi architecture by architect Friedrich Bagdons.

=== War memorial ===
A War memorial in form of a lying soldier guided by an eagle of 1930 by Friedrich Bagdons, too, is placed directly into the ruins of the Hohensyburg. After World War II the memorial got a Commemorative plaque with the name of killed soldiers from Syburg as supplement.

=== Funicular ===
A funicular was installed for the touristic development of the hill on the eastern slope in 1903, that worked until World War I and was dismantled in the 1920s. Its basis station was neighboured by a tramway terminus. Remnants of the funicular are yet visible in the area.

=== Husen ===
The building's ensemble Husen, consisting of Husen Castle, a tower house of medieval origin, and a manor house in classicistic style, lies at the bottom of the Syburg east slope near to the Ruhr and the Lake Hengstey in the neighbourhood of a campsite (Campingplatz Hohensyburg).

== Other points of interest ==
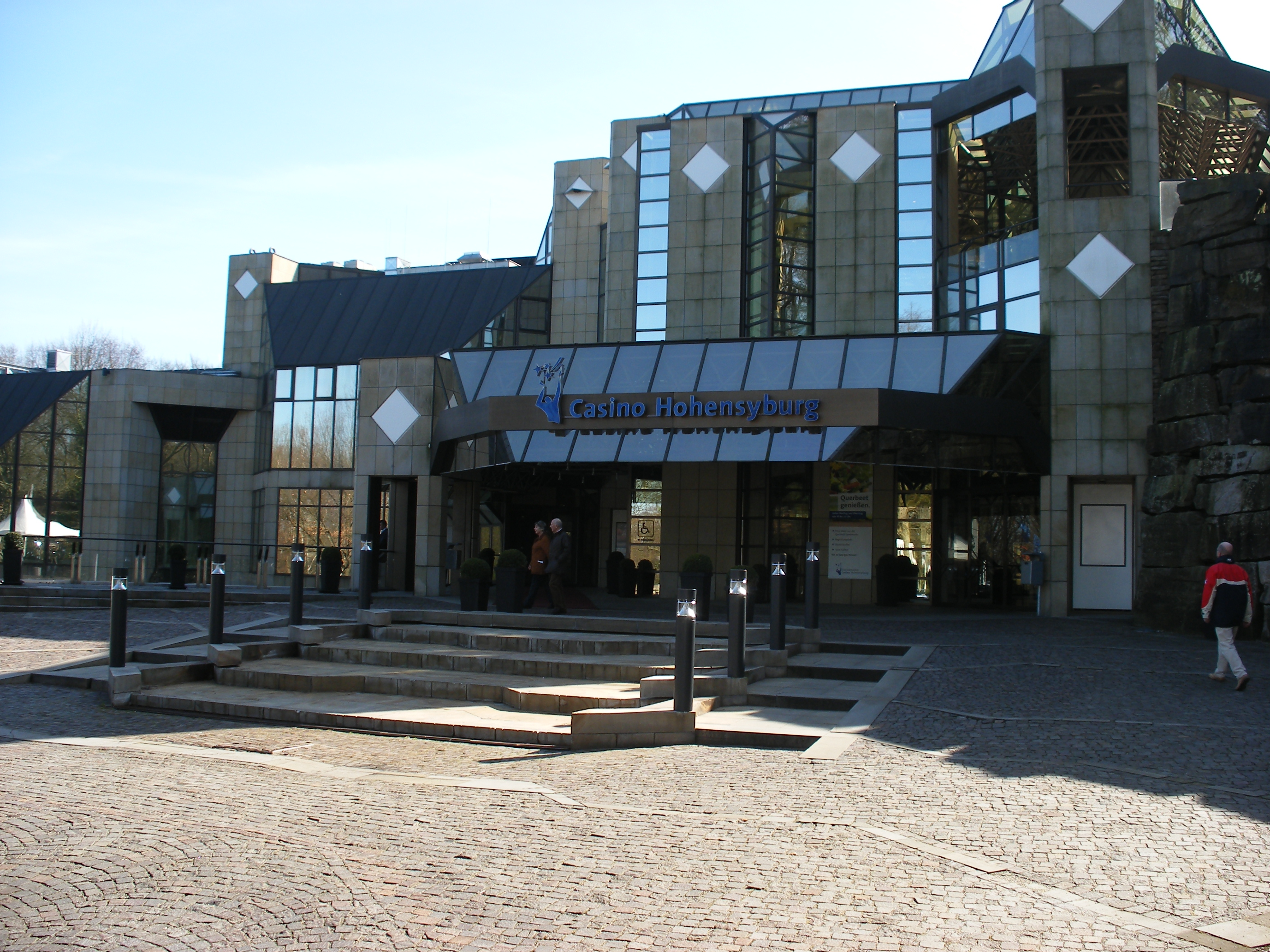
Casino Hohensyburg

=== Open-air stage ===
Near to the basis station of the former funicular an open-air stage has been run since 1952 with theatre performances in the warm seasons named Naturbühne.

=== Casino ===
The Casino Hohensyburg (Spielbank Hohensyburg) is one of the four casinos of North Rhine-Westphalia. Its building was designed by architect Harald Deilmann. The casino's grand opening featured a concert with Sammy Davis Jr. in June 1985 on the Syberg.

== Property and protection ==
The Hohensyburg ruins with war memorial, the Vincketower, and the national monument are now property of the supracommunal authority Landschaftsverband Westfalen-Lippe (LWL). The Sigiburg, the Hohensyburg, the Emperor William monument, the Vincke tower, the St Peter's church, the Peter's font, the Husen castle, the funicular, and the mining relicts are classified as historical monuments by regulations of the state of North Rhine-Westphalia.

== Town quarter ==
On the gently inclined northern slope of the Syberg the settlement Syburg developed near to the church. The self-governed rural community became a quarter of the town of Dortmund in 1928 in the frame of an extensive local government reorganization, and is now part of its town district Hörde.
