= Hörde =

Urban district of Dortmund, Germany

Coordinates: 51°29′N 7°30′E

Coat of arms

Hörde (German pronunciation: [ˈhœʁdə]) is a Stadtbezirk ("City District") and also a Stadtteil (Quarter) in the south of the city of Dortmund, in Germany.

Hörde is situated at 51°29' North, 7°30' West, and is at an elevation of 112 metres above mean sea level. It is situated in the southern part of Dortmund, a major town in the Ruhrgebiet. It is made up of the areas of Wellinghofen, Höchsten, Benninghofen, Loh, Holzen, Sommerberg, Syburg, and Wichlinghofen, as well as Hörde itself. The region was formerly a heavy industry area, particularly for the production and working of steel. The river Emscher flows through Hörde. It flows through the former "Phoenix" industrial park, which is currently being restored to a natural area. When finished, the Emscher will once again be a clean river, and there will be a lake (Phoenix-See).

== Coat of arms ==
The coat of arms of the Stadtbezirk shows the Hörder Burg (Hörde Castle), overlaid with a red-and-white chequered band that was used as the sign of the Counts of Mark. The semicircle is originally green and represents a meadow. The background is golden.

== History ==
Originally Hörde was a separate town (until 1929), rather than forming part of Dortmund. The name derives from the natural surroundings: "Hörde" derives from "Huryde" or "Huride", meaning "fold".

The town was founded by the Counts of Mark in opposition to their principal enemy, the town of Dortmund. The first settlers were Wellinghofer, who had been resettled by the count. The count wanted to surround Dortmund by separate towns (including the towns of Herdecke, Witten, Bochum, Castrop, Lünen, Unna und Schwerte). In 1388, the "Großen Dortmunder Fehde" (great feud of Dortmund) took place, where the city of Dortmund battled against the alliance of surrounding towns. The struggle ended in 1390, with defeat for Hörde and its allies.

Until 1929 Hörde was an independent city, and the capital of the eponymous region, before being incorporated by Dortmund.

During the time of the Third Reich, a Gestapo jail was located in a Hörde police station. In 1945, the murder of many political prisoners which took place in Dortmund Rombergpark was organised from here.

== Notable sights ==
A symbol of Hörde is the Schlanke Mathilde ("Slim Matilda"), rebuilt in 1983 from historical pictures. It represented a former mayor's wife, and was allegedly built by the citizens of the town to annoy the mayor, whose wife was far from slim.

The Hörder Burg (Hörde castle) is located in the east of the town, close to the river Emscher. It was built in the 12th century, and today houses a museum.
