= Ludwig von Vincke =

Politician, writer and jurist (1774–1844)

- Freiherr
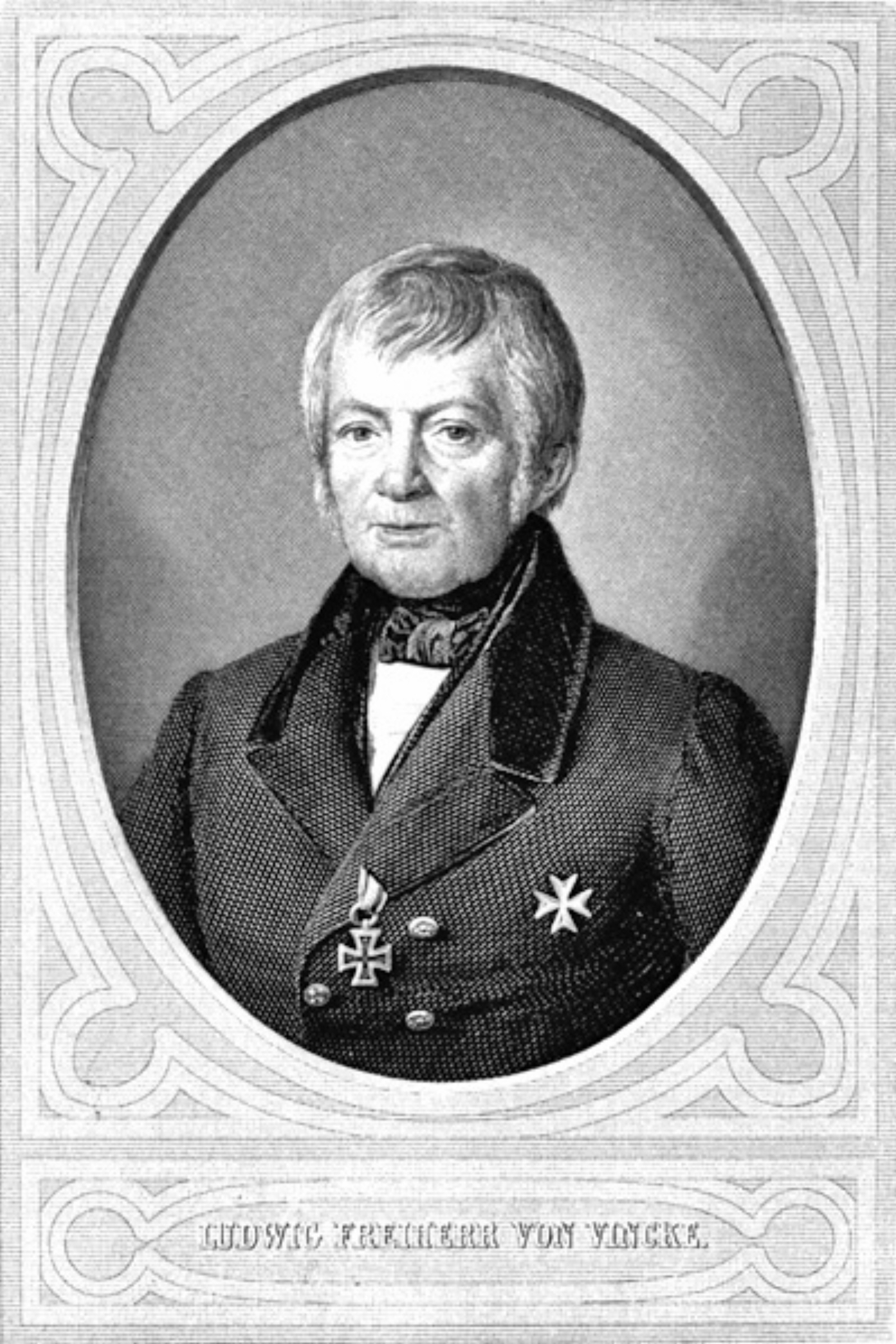
- Chalcography from a painting of Friedrich Boser (1840)
- Full name: Friedrich Ludwig Wilhelm Philip Freiherr von Vincke
- Born: 23 December 1774; Minden (Kingdom of Prussia)
- Died: 2 December 1844 (aged 69); Münster (Prussia)
- Buried: Hagen
- Noble family: Vincke family
- Occupation: Statesman

Friedrich Ludwig Wilhelm Philip Freiherr von (Note: Like many other family members, Ludwig von Vincke himself mostly did not use the particle "von" (of), and often omitted even the "Freiherr" (Baron).) Vincke (23 December 1774 – 2 December 1844) was a liberal Prussian statesman. Born as member of an old Westphalian noble family and educated at three universities in a broad variety of subjects, he entered the Prussian service as head of local and regional authorities. Influenced by ideas of British liberalism, he joined the Prussian Reform Movement during the times of the Napoleonic Wars, and was an important member as co-worker of the Barons vom Stein and vom Stein zum Altenstein.

After the Congress of Vienna Vincke became the Supreme President of the Province of Westphalia, one of the newly founded Western Provinces of the reorganized Kingdom of Prussia. Vincke modernized the provincial administration, supported agricultural reforms, industrial development, and enlargement of traffic ways, and fostered the coexistence of the diverse Christian confessions in the multiconfessional province. He supported the idea of public self-government on the local and regional level, but the restorative tendencies in the governmental policy laid down limits for his efforts.

== Life and career ==
=== Early life ===
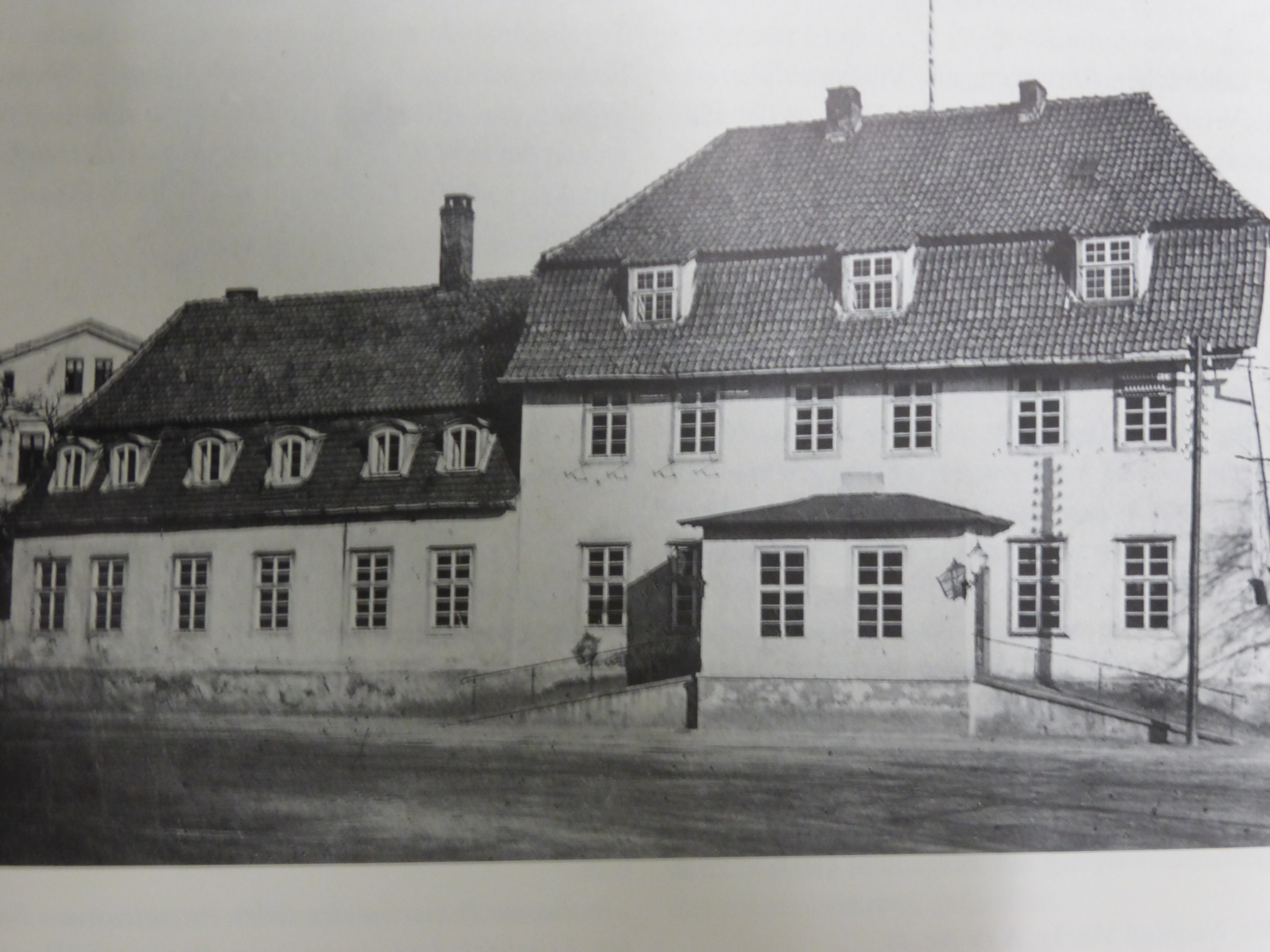
Vincke's house of birth, the Cathedral dechany in Minden (pulled down in 1883)

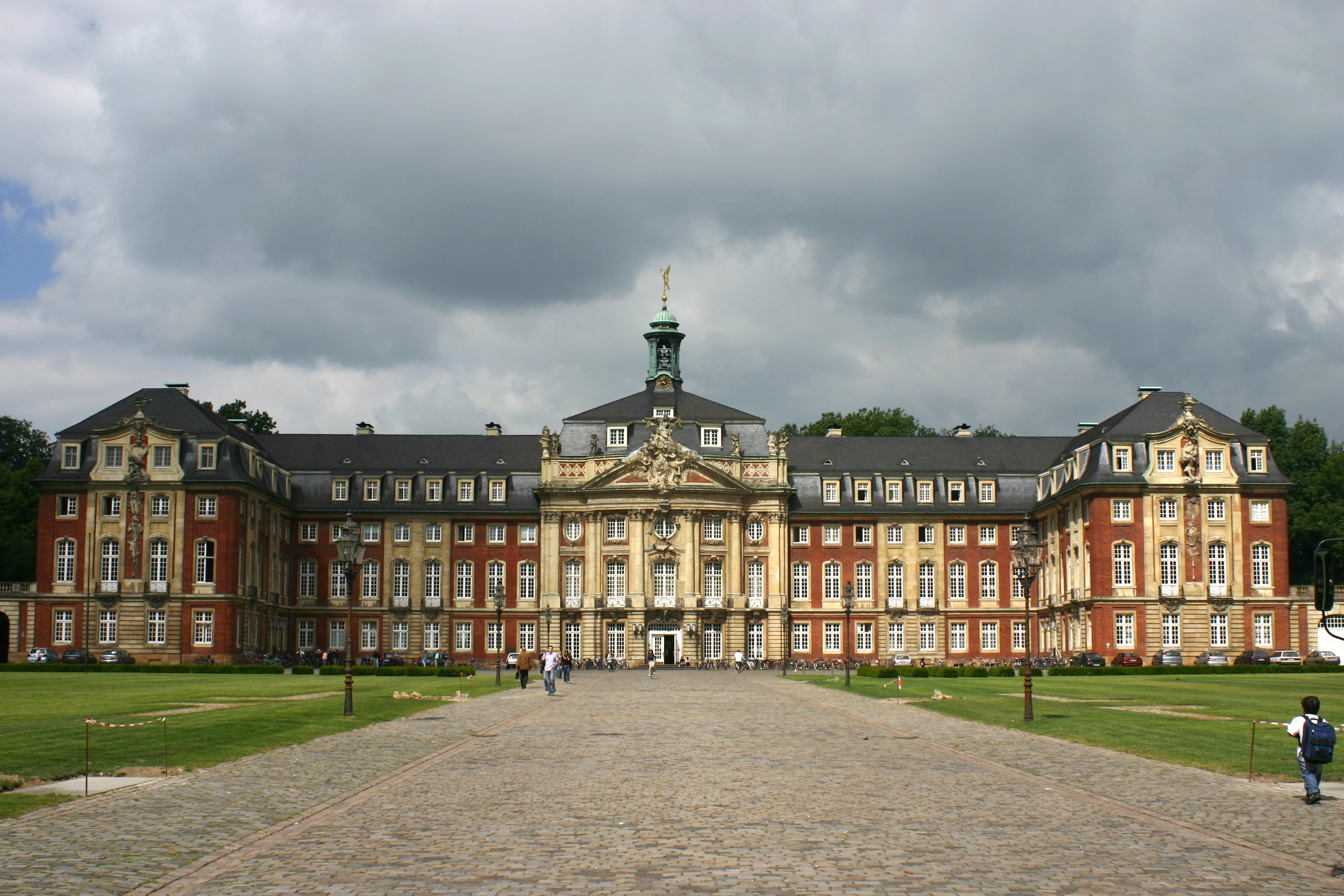
Münster Palace, Vincke's working and living place 1804–1807, 1813–1844

Ludwig von Vincke was born in Minden (Minden-Ravensberg) on 23 December 1774 as a member of the old Westphalian Vincke family, of the Ostenwalde line. He was the second son of Ernst Idel Jobst von Vincke (1738–1813), the dean (Note: According to the regulations of the Peace of Westphalia from 1648, the Cathedral of Minden remained to the Catholic church, although the whole Principality of Minden together with its capital was a Protestant territory. The Cathedral chapter constituted of members of both confessions. Thus the Protestant Ernst Idel Jobst von Vincke (1738–1813) could be Dean of the Chapter, as well as his sons Ernst (1768–1845) and Karl Philipp (1770–1813).) of the Minden Cathedral chapter, and his wife Luise Sophie von Buttlar (1739–1806). He grew up with two brothers and three sisters.

From 1784 to 1787 Ludwig von Vincke visited the private school of Johann Lehzen in Hanover, father of Louise Lehzen, where he learned the English language. The next three years he was educated at the Pedagogium in Halle (Saale) under August Hermann Niemeyer, followed by university studies at the Hessian University of Marburg, the Prussian University of Erlangen, and the Hanoverian University of Göttingen from 1792 to 1795 in the matters of law, economy, agriculture, philosophy, and history. (Note: To that time in some greater German territories, so in Prussia, regulations were in force that obliged the applicant for a position in state administration to have studied at a "native" university of the state they wanted to work for.) In Marburg he lived in the house of Johann Heinrich Jung-Stilling, his professor for economical and financial science; further academic instructors were Johann Ludwig Klüber in Erlangen, and Johann Stephan Pütter, Ludwig Timotheus Spittler and Georg Friedrich von Martens in Göttingen.

His professional career in civil administration began in the Prussian capital Berlin as collaborator of the Chamber of War Affairs and State Property (Kriegs- und Domänenkammer), (Note: The "Chamber of War Affairs and State Property" was the leading authority of a Prussian province until 1807.) and soon in August 1798 he was appointed as Landrat in Minden, the head of district administration, an honorary position with only small remuneration, so his father gave him regular financial support.

His duty was broken by two longer journeys. From March until October 1800 he traveled to England to study its administrative system, its economy, and especially its agriculture. There he met Arthur Young and visited the model farm of the Duke of Bedford in Woburn. His duty was broken once more from November 1801 until March 1803 by a journey to Spain at the instigation of the Prussian government in order to buy merinos to improve the sheep breeding. From 1799 until his death Vincke was in correspondence with agronomist Albrecht Thaer.

Further steps of career were President of the Chamber of War Affairs and State Property in Aurich (East Frisia) (1803) and the same function in Münster and Hamm simultaneously (1804 to 1807) as successor of the Baron vom Stein.

=== During the Napoleonic Wars ===
After the Prussian defeat in the War of the Fourth Coalition the French occupation regime dismissed him in March 1807. Out of duty, he visited England once more from May until October 1807, about what he wrote a detailed report.

Then he went to East Prussia as an informal collaborator of Baron vom Stein, the leading Prussian reformer, whom he assisted in his attempts to reform the political system in Prussia. He drew up memoranda dealing with the constitution of municipalities, the administration of the state, the abolition of guild obligations, and the corporative representation. After Stein's dismissal in September 1808, Vincke worked for his successor Karl vom Stein zum Altenstein in the administration of finance. At the end of the year, King Frederick William III ordered a backdated payment for his engagement and appointed him leader (Regierungspräsident) of the regional government in Potsdam, but Vincke dismissed from it in March 1810 and dealt afterwards with the management of his first wife's inherited property Haus Ickern near Castrop (then Grand Duchy of Berg).

After the Kingdom of Prussia had allied with Russia during the German campaign of 1813, Vincke was arrested by the French Occupants in March 1813 for some days because of his relation to the Baron vom Stein, and after that banished to the region left of the Rhine.

=== Supreme President of Westphalia ===
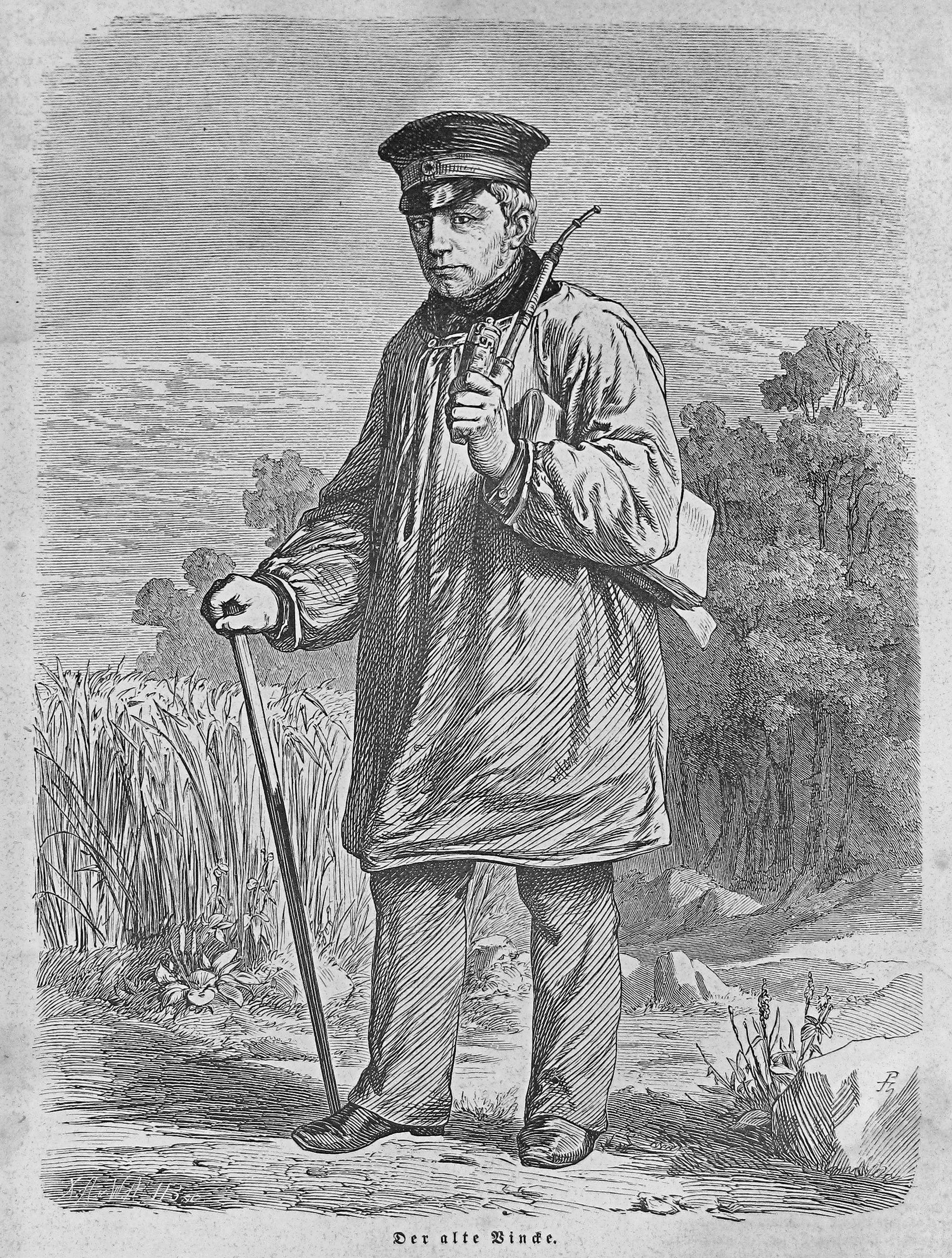
Vincke travelling through the province (drawing in Die Gartenlaube, 1863)

As consequence of Napoleon‘s defeat in the Battle of Leipzig in October 1813, Prussia regained and increased its Westphalian territories, wherein Vincke became the leading position as civil governor in November 1813. After the Congress of Vienna in 1815, the administration of the Kingdom of Prussia was completely reorganized: Vincke was appointed as Supreme President (Oberpräsident) of the new founded Province of Westphalia and in addition, as Regional president (Regierungspräsident) of one of its three regions in Münster. Furthermore, he was appointed member of the Prussian State Council from its establishment in 1817 until his death.

In the following peacetime, the inner reorganisation of Prussia was going on more in the direction of centralization, and with less scope for the provinces, as the reformers had claimed. Though repeatedly promised by the King, Prussia remained without a definite constitution and lacked a central parliament; only provincial parliaments with consultative, not decisive competence were constituted since 1823, formed by representatives of the nobility and the main taxpayers. Vincke tried to balance this in a certain way as representative of Westphalia with regard to the government. Among the Supreme Presidents he was part of a "liberal group" together with his colleagues of the Rhenanian provinces and Theodor von Schön of the Province of Prussia. They tried to bundle their influence by common memoranda and informal meetings, until Chancellor Karl August von Hardenberg forbade such meetings without his personal permission.

Vincke was busy to improve the infrastructure of the province, to reform the agricultural situation, and to develop the industrial forces. He was faced to the challenge to integrate the new province, composed of more than 20 former territories of the extinct Holy Roman Empire with different traditions.

Especially the opposition of the Catholic regions, dominating in Westphalia, to the Protestant majority in Prussia, of which the King was the supreme Protestant bishop, led to occasional conflicts. Vincke himself was a devout Lutheran, and Catholic liturgy disconcerted him. Under the Prussian government the Catholic nobility had lost its former political influence, and great differences in theologically based ideas of school education or interconfessional marriages arose. Nevertheless, Vincke was well acquainted with leading Catholics like the conciliant Bishop Ferdinand August von Spiegel, but stood in permanent opposition to the narrow-minded Vicar General Clemens August Droste zu Vischering. On the other hand, he was sceptical to the Protestant movements of Pietism and Christian revival. When after the ordered unification of Lutherans and Calvinists in the Prussian Union of Churches a new agenda for worship, written under personal collaboration and supervision of King Frederick William III, had to be implemented, a lot of parishes refused to accept it; in his capacity as President of the Consistory of Westphalia Vincke helped to find a compromise after some years.

In contrast to his liberal political ideas, he showed a conspicuous antisemitism: he claimed the Jews should be integrated into the Christian society by baptism or leave the country. In this sense he supported the school project of Alexander Haindorf in Münster, and became president of Haindorf's school association.

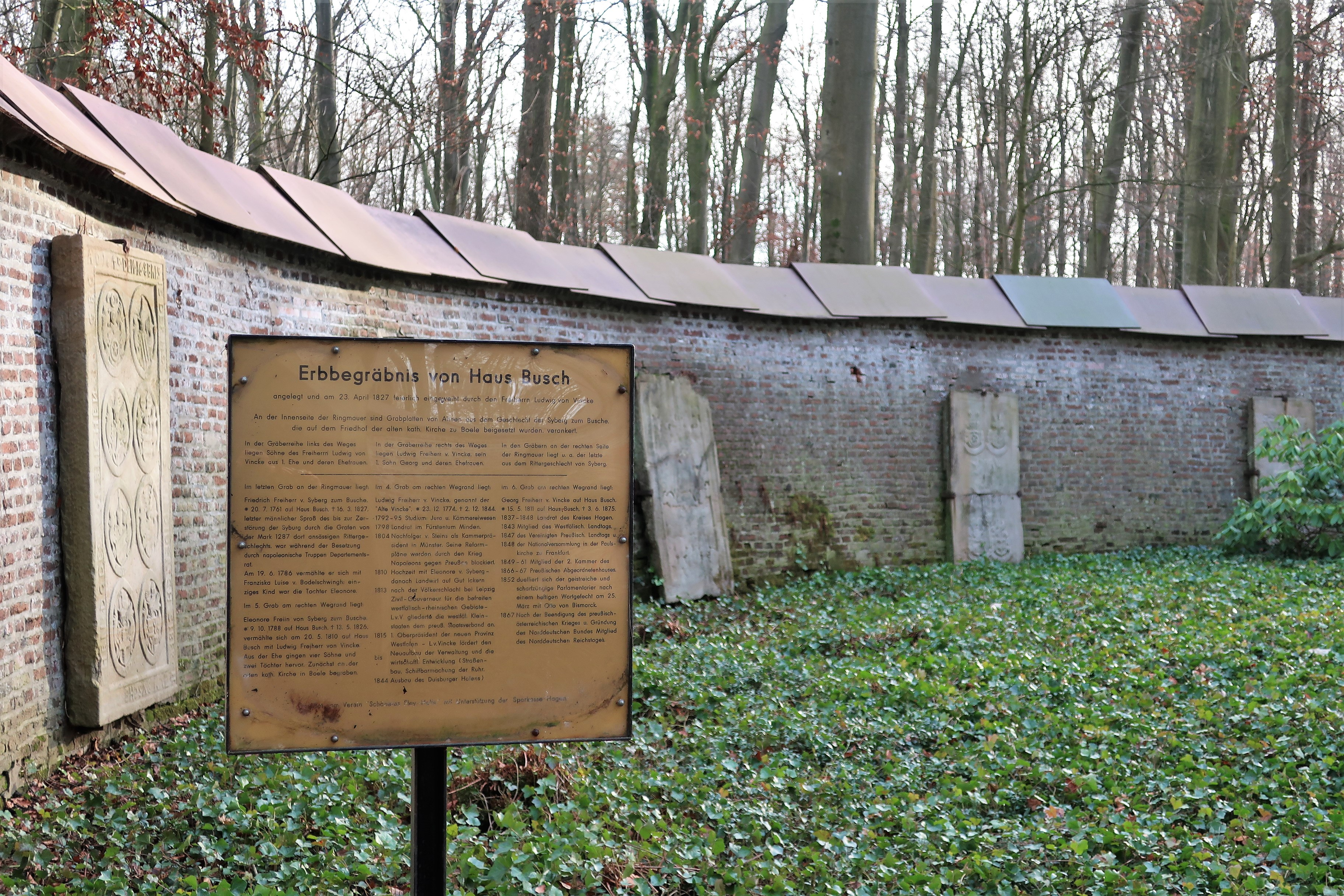
Private cemetery of Haus Busch in Hagen with Vincke's gravesite

Vincke criticized the bad conditions of the public school system, especially the disadvantage of elementary schools against the grammar schools (gymnasium) since his time in Minden. When he had the provincial school system in his charge as Supreme President, he cared for improvement. His claims for the foundation of trade schools were successful not until after his death. He was interested in caring for handicapped people, and supported an institution for deaf-mutes in Soest and for blinds of Pauline von Mallinckrodt in Paderborn.

Vincke was in duty with the longest period of office of all Supreme Presidents in Prussian history. He ran his official duties "as a travelling man, not as a writing official", and by travelling through the region—sometimes costumed in the manner of the rural people—he got a considerable popularity. On his last official journey to Minden in November 1844, he suffered a stroke, where he died some days later in Münster on 2 December 1844. He was interred at a gravesite on the private cemetery Erbbegräbnis Haus Busch near to the family property Haus Busch in Hagen. (Note: Vincke had inherited this property from his first wife.)

Vincke's official residence in Münster was Münster Palace, where he had his private rooms in one wing of the building. His neighbours in the other wing were the commanders of the Army troops stationed in Münster, from 1804 to 1806 the General Blücher, and since 1815 the commanders VII Army Corps.

Ludwig von Vincke kept a diary continuously from 1789 until his death; an edition in eleven volumes was published from 2009 to 2022.

== Family and issue ==
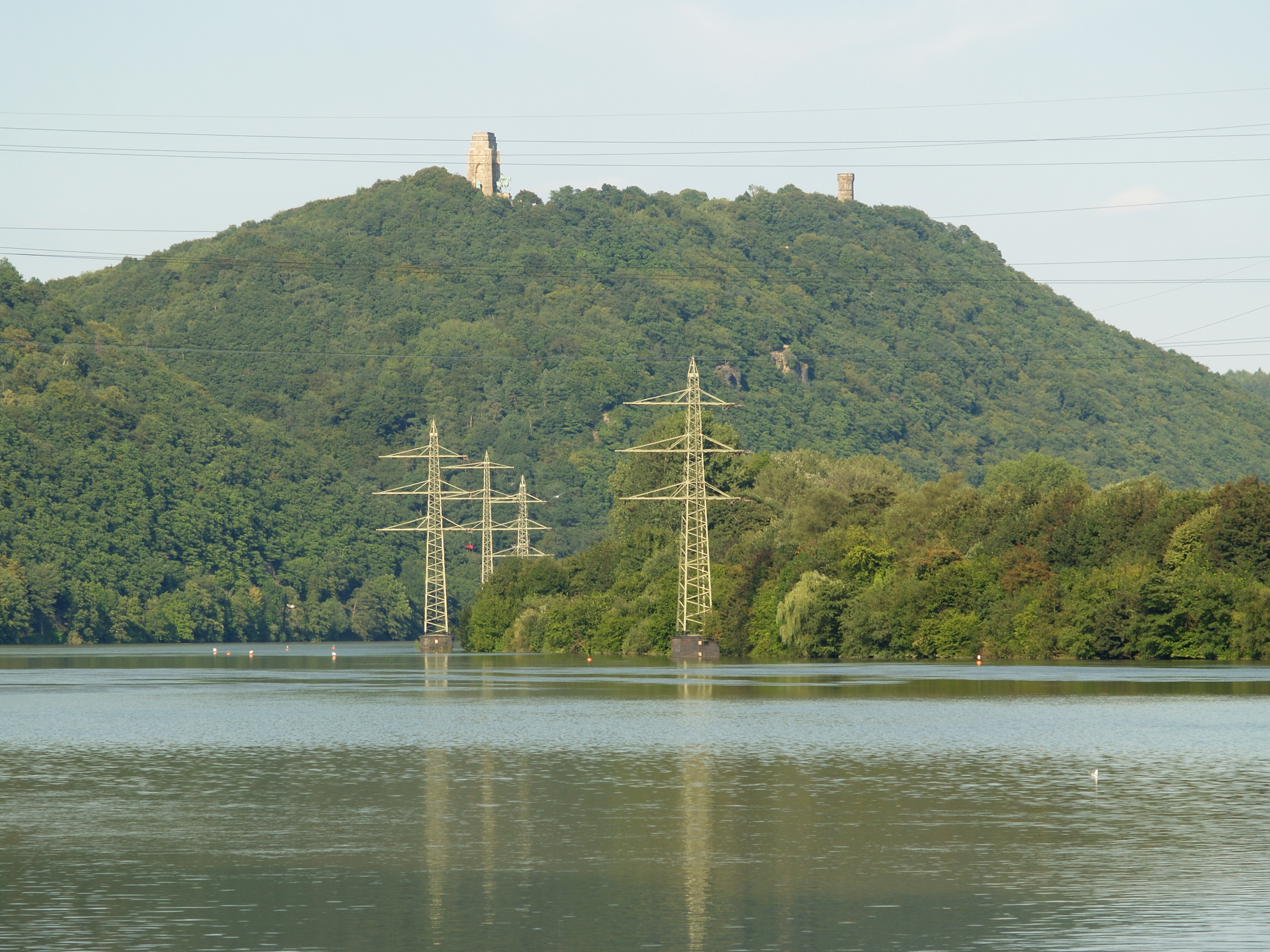
Vincke tower (right) on the Syberg (Dortmund); in front: Lake Hengstey

Ludwig von Vincke married twice in 1810 and 1827; his first wife was Eleonore von Syberg (1788–1826), and his second wife was Luise von Hohnhorst (1798–1873). He had eight children with his first and five children with his second wife. His first son, Georg von Vincke (1811–1875) became a liberal politician, and the second son, Gisbert von Vincke (1813–1891) a civil servant, author, Shakespeare-researcher, and president of the German Shakespeare Society.

Vincke's elder brother, Ernst Idel Jobst von Vincke (1768–1845), was a Hanoverian general lieutenant and administrator of the family trust Gut Ostenwalde. Georg von Vincke held this function since 1846, after which he was succeeded by his younger brother Friedrich von Vincke (1824–1901).

Ludwig von Vincke's elder sister Lisette (1766–1838) married Baron Eberhard von der Recke (1744–1816), Prussian minister of justice from 1784 to 1807. Vincke's younger sister Charlotte (1780–1833) married Baron (since 1840: Count) Kaspar Heinrich von Sierstorpff-Driburg (1750–1842), the founder and owner of the Bad Driburg spa. Their son, Count Ernst von Sierstorpff-Driburg married his cousin, Ludwig's daughter Caroline (1822–1870); both are great-great-grandparents of Queen Beatrix of the Netherlands.

Ernst von Bodelschwingh was a cousin of Eleonore Vincke, Supreme President of the Rhine Province (1834), and Prussian minister of finance (1842); he wrote the first detailed biography of Ludwig von Vincke's early years until 1816. (Note: A scientific biography over Vincke's complete life is yet a desideratum.) Another cousin was the Hanoverian Field Marshall Carl August von Alten.

== Honours ==
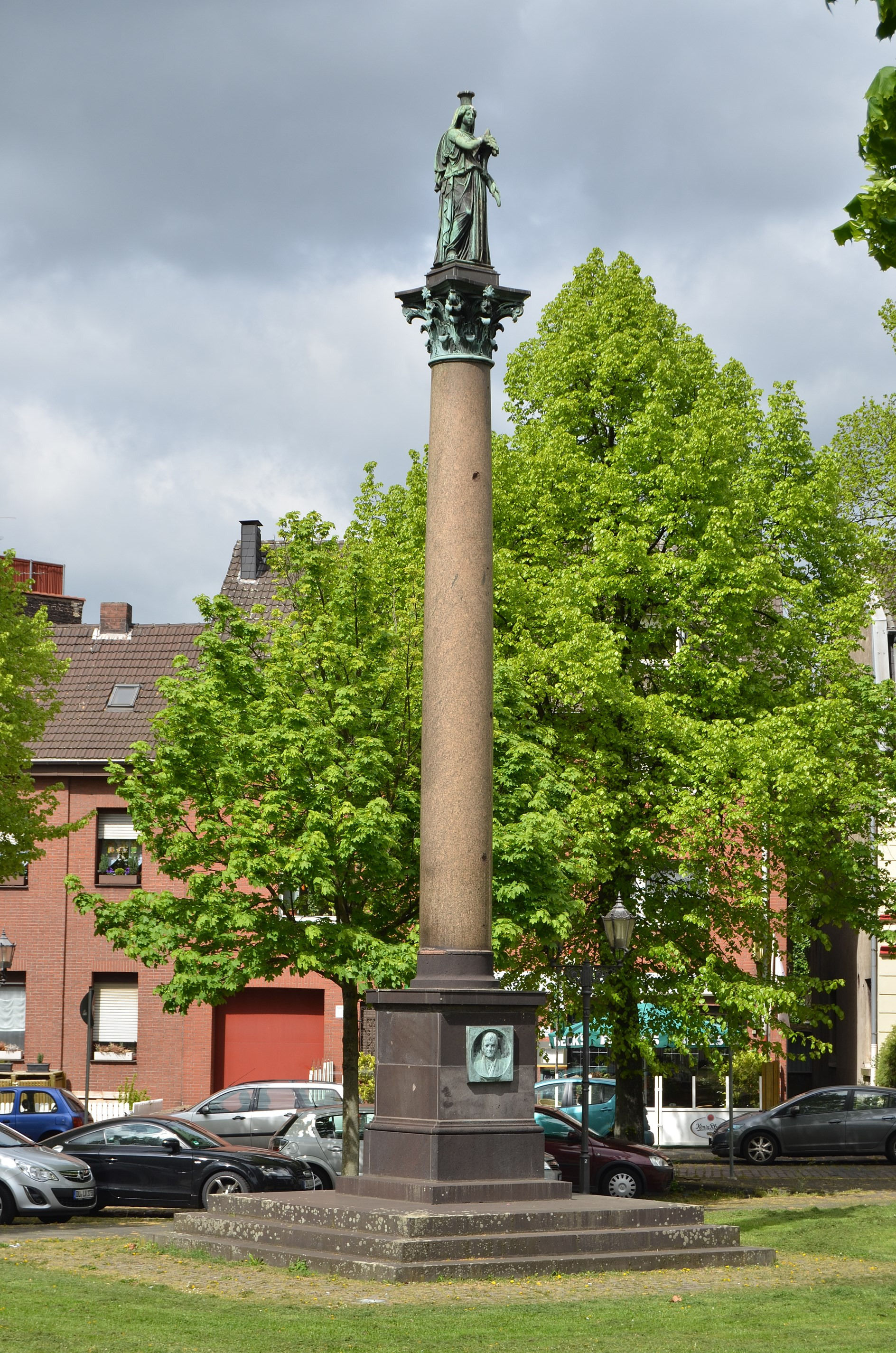
Vincke column in Duisburg-Ruhrort

- Knight of the Order of Saint John (Bailiwick of Brandenburg) (1795)
- Iron Cross for Civilians (1814)
- Order of the Black Eagle (1842)
- Honorary doctorate of the University of Bonn (1819)
- "Wirklicher Geheiner Rat" with entitlement Excellency (1825)
- Honorary citizen of his native town Minden (1841)

The first public monument dedicated to Vincke was the Vincke column (Vinckesäule) of 1847 in the harbour of Ruhrort (today: Duisburg). The Vincke tower (Vincketurm) on the Syberg hill (today: Dortmund) was built in 1857 and renewed in 1882. The name Ludwigsdorf for a settlement in the village of Ihlow reminds of his work in East Frisia. Many towns in Westphalia have named streets or places after Vincke. His native town Minden honoured Vincke by a plaque at the site of the house of his birth, and named a secondary school after him. (Note: The dechany at the Great Cathedral Court, where Vincke was born in 1774, was pulled down in 1883 to build a new post office that was destroyed in 1945 by a bomb raid. The plaque is fixed at the rebuilt post office of the 1950s.)

== Works ==
- Darstellung der innern Verwaltung Großbritanniens. Ed. by Barthold Georg Niebuhr, Berlin 1815 [Description of the internal administration of Great Britain]
- Die Tagebücher des Ludwig Freiherrn Vincke 1789–1844. 11 Volumes. Aschendorff, Münster 2009 ff. ISBN 3-402-15740-3 [Diaries]

== Sources ==
- Bodelschwingh, Ernst von, ed. (1853). Leben des Ober-Präsidenten Freiherrn von Vincke. Erster Theil 1774-1816 (in German). Berlin: Georg Reimer.
- Burg, Peter (1994). "Ludwig Freiherr von Vincke". www.lwl.org/westfaelische-geschichte/portal/ (in German). Landschaftsverband Westfalen-Lippe.
- Kraus, Hans-Christof (2016). Historische Kommmission der Bayerischen Akademie der Wissenschaften (ed.). Vincke, Ludwig Freiherr von. Neue Deutsche Biographie (in German). Vol. 26. Berlin: Duncker & Humblot. pp. 815–817. ISBN 978-3-428-11207-4.
