= Karl von Vincke =

German officer

Karl Gisbert Friedrich Freiherr von Vincke
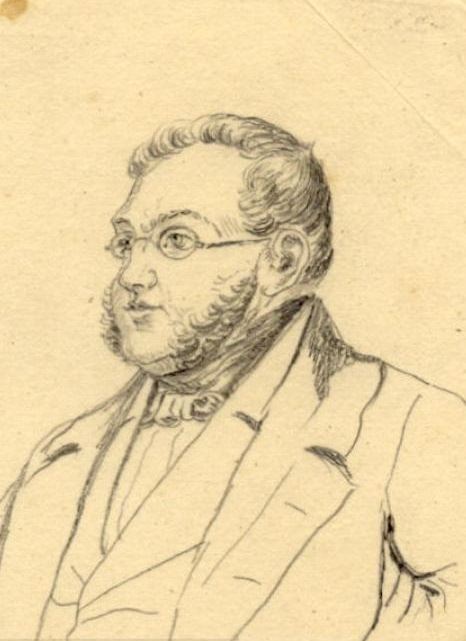
- Karl Gisbert Friedrich Freiherr von Vincke
- Relation: Vincke family

Karl Gisbert Friedrich Freiherr von Vincke (also Carl von Vincke; von Vincke-Olbendorf, 1800–1869) was a Prussian officer and politician.

== Career ==
He served in the Prussian Army from 1817, from 1829 in the general staff, from 1832 in the rank of captain in VI. Armee-Korps. He participated in the military reform of the Ottoman army as an advisor from 1837, and participated in the war in Egypt in 1840. Later in 1840, he was promoted to major and reassigned to the Gardekorps. He left the active service in 1843, but remained in the army until 1850, reaching the rank of lieutenant colonel. From 1843, he began to participate in politics on the liberal party even while maintaining a personal friendship with William I, German Emperor, facilitating both his escape into exile following the March Revolution of 1848, and his return later in June of the same year. He was a member of the Landtag of Prussia from 1849 to 1854, and from 1850 member of the Erfurt parliament. From 1858 until his death he was a member of the Prussian House of Representatives. He served as a witness in the pistol duel between Otto von Bismarck and Georg von Vincke in 1852.
