= Syburg =

- Borough of Dortmund
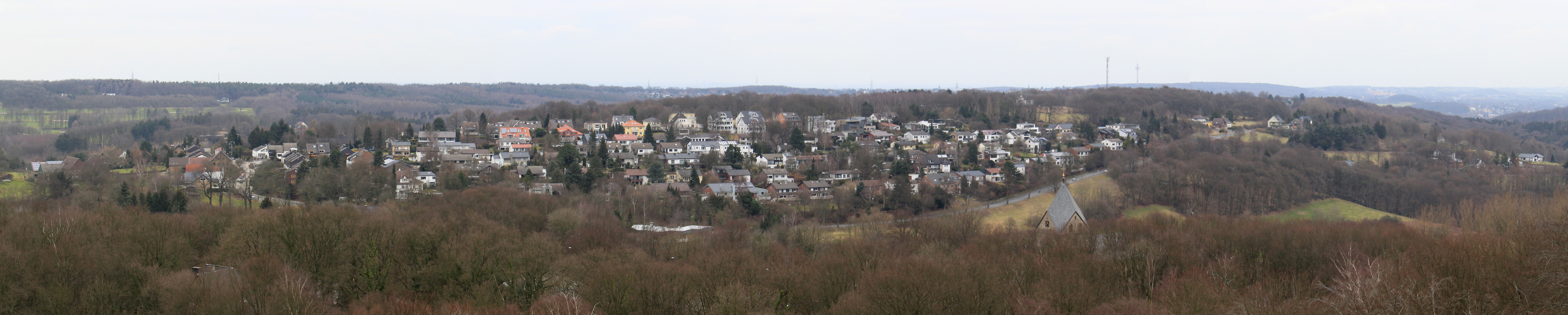
- View from Vincketurm to Syburg

- Location within Dortmund
- Interactive map of Syburg
- Location within Germany Location within North Rhine-Westphalia
- Coordinates: 51°25′32″N 07°29′14″E
- Country: Germany
- State: North Rhine-Westphalia
- City: Dortmund

Area
  - Total: 8.122 km^{2} (3.136 sq mi)
- Elevation: 220 m (720 ft)

Population (2022)
  - Total: 1,431
  - Density: 176.2/km^{2} (456.3/sq mi)
- Time zone: UTC+01:00 (CET)
  - Summer (DST): UTC+02:00 (CEST)
- Postal codes: 44265
- Dialling codes: 0231

Syburg is a borough of the city of Dortmund in the Ruhr district of North Rhine-Westphalia, Germany. Since 1929, it has been a borough of Dortmund, located in the city's south. It is part of the Hörde district (Stadtbezirk).

== History ==
Syburg was an independent settlement, part of the Amt Westhofen. In 1929, it became a borough of Dortmund, as part of the Wellinghofen district. From 1 January 1975 it was part of the Hörde district.

Syburg has been an excursion destination of Dortmund's citizens. It was connected to Hörde since the beginning of the 20th century by the Hörder Kreisbahn tram.

Syburg features several sites and monuments including:

- St. Peter, Syburg, a Romanesque church
- Hohensyburg, a ruined castle
- Kaiser-Wilhelm-Denkmal, a monument to Wilhelm I
- Vincketurm
- Spielbank Hohensyburg
- Naturbühne Hohensyburg, an open-air stage
- Syburger Bergbauweg, a trail connecting mining sites
- Burg Husen
- Haus Husen

The Hohensyburg is above the Hengsteysee, a dam of the Ruhr. Syburg features a golf course, the Wannebach valley, several restaurants and Dortmund's only campground.
