= Vincke family =

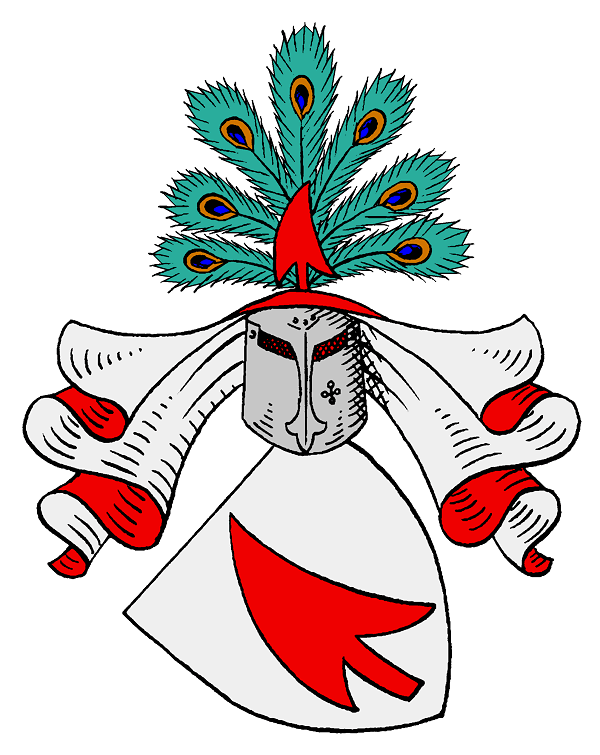

The Vincke family is an old and influential German noble family from Westphalia, with its roots in Lower Saxony, whose members distinguished themselves as politicians, mostly in the Kingdom of Prussia.

== History ==
First recorded in 1223 in Osnabrück, their name derives from the zoonym finch (Middle High German vinke). They acquired estates in the present communities of Melle (Gut Ostenwalde) and Rödinghausen (Haus Kilver) in the 14th century, and in the 18th to 19th centuries further possessions in Rödinghausen and other parts of Westphalia, as well in Silesia (Kilver line).

In the 19th century, Prussia granted the habitual right to the title Freiherr (baron); the predicate von was used only by parts of the family (Freiherren Vincke vs. Freiherren von Vincke).

Notable member of the Olbendorf line (Kilver line) of the family was the Prussian politician Carl von Vincke. Ludwig von Vincke, of the Ostenwalde line (1774–1844), served as president of the Prussian Province of Westphalia. His sons were the politician Georg von Vincke, known for fighting a pistol duel with Otto von Bismarck in 1852, and Gisbert von Vincke (1813–1892), Prussian official, poet and Shakespeare-researcher.

Gut Ostenwalde with the nearby Diedrichsburg is yet a property of the Vincke family, whereas Haus Kilver had to be sold in the 1820s for economic reasons. After World War II Gut Ostenwalde was confiscated by the British Army as residence for the commanders of the British occupation zone in Germany, Field Marshal Bernard Montgomery and his successors Marshal Sholto Douglas and General Brian Robertson.

== Notable members ==
- Karl von Vincke (1800–1869), Prussian officer
- Georg von Vincke (1811–1875), Prussian politician
- Ludwig von Vincke (1774–1844), Prussian statesman

== Gallery ==
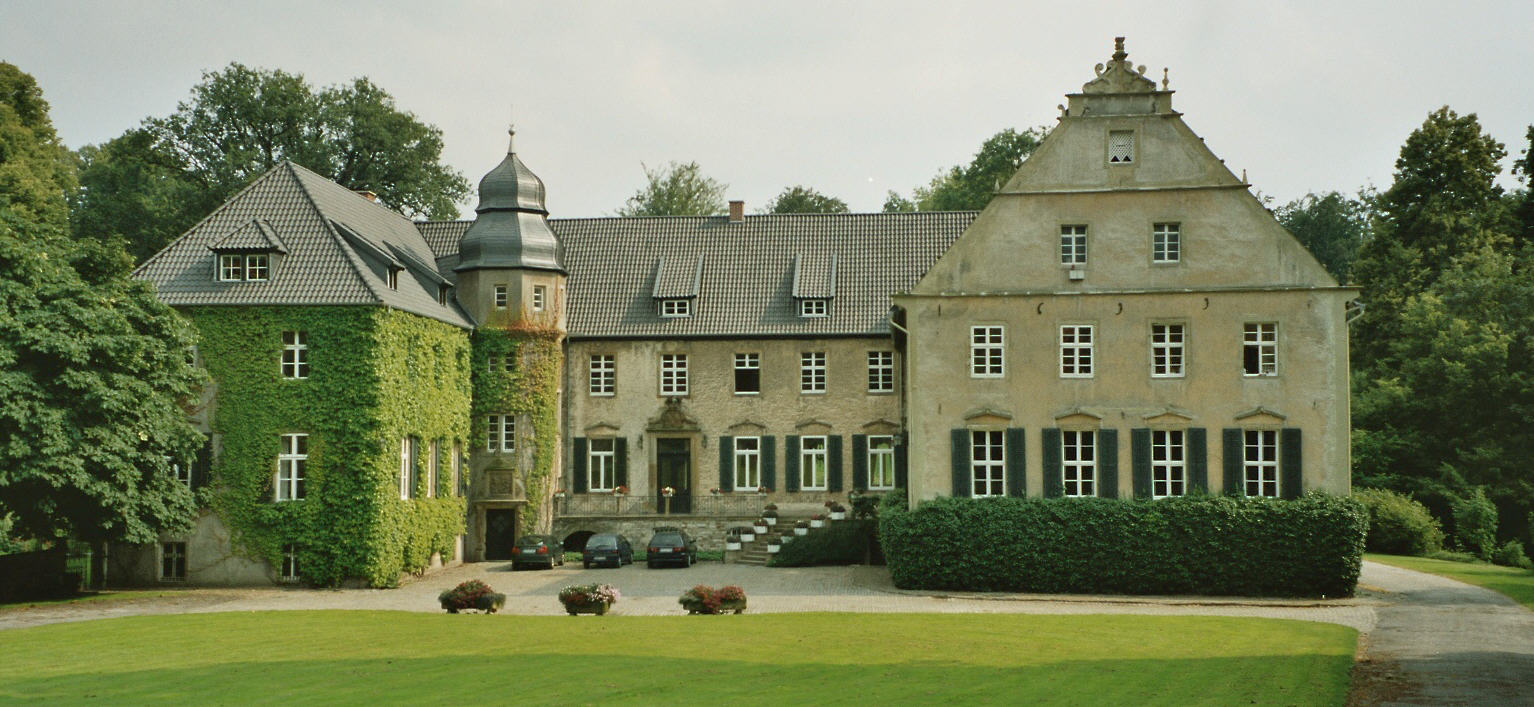
Gut Ostenwalde

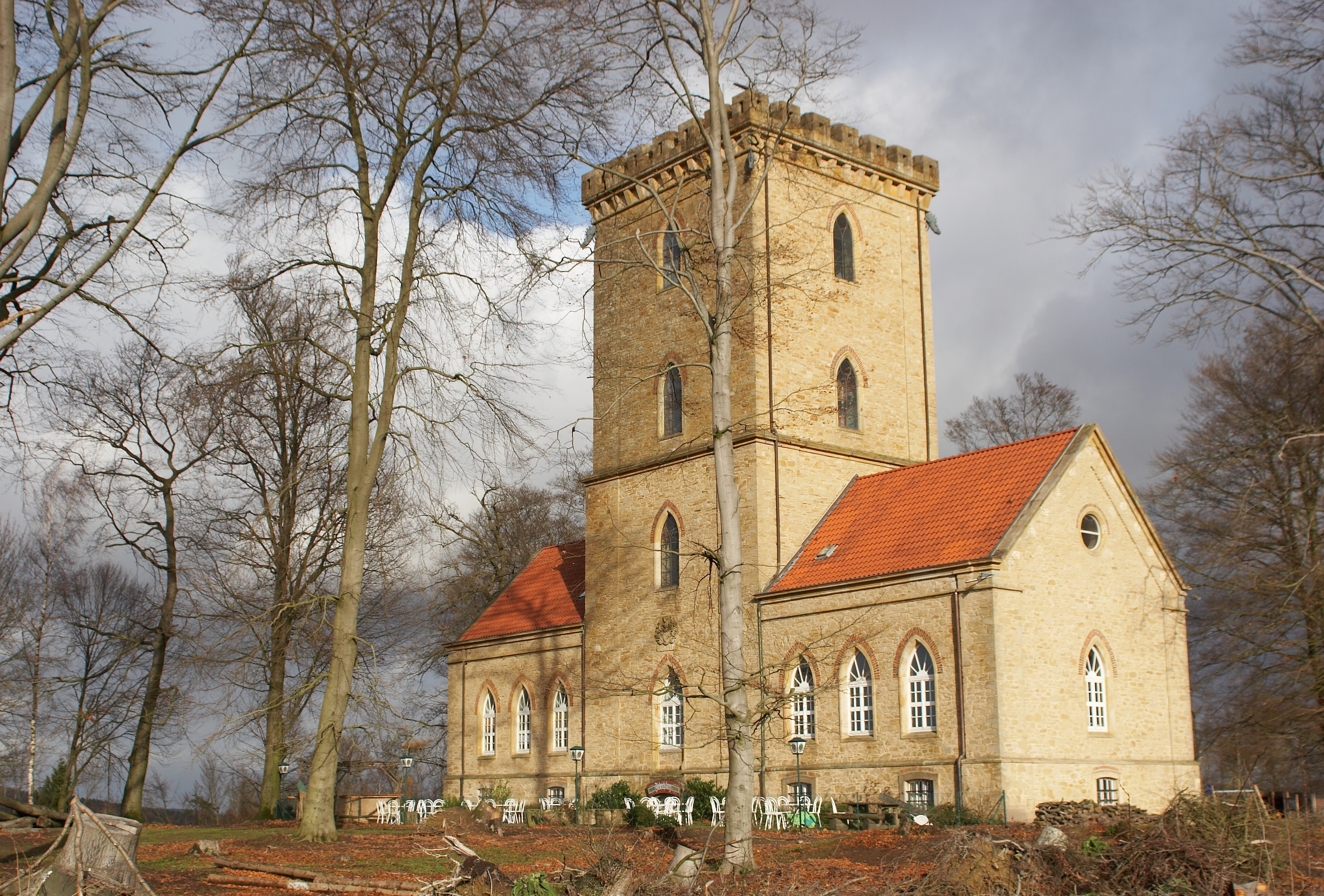
Diedrichsburg

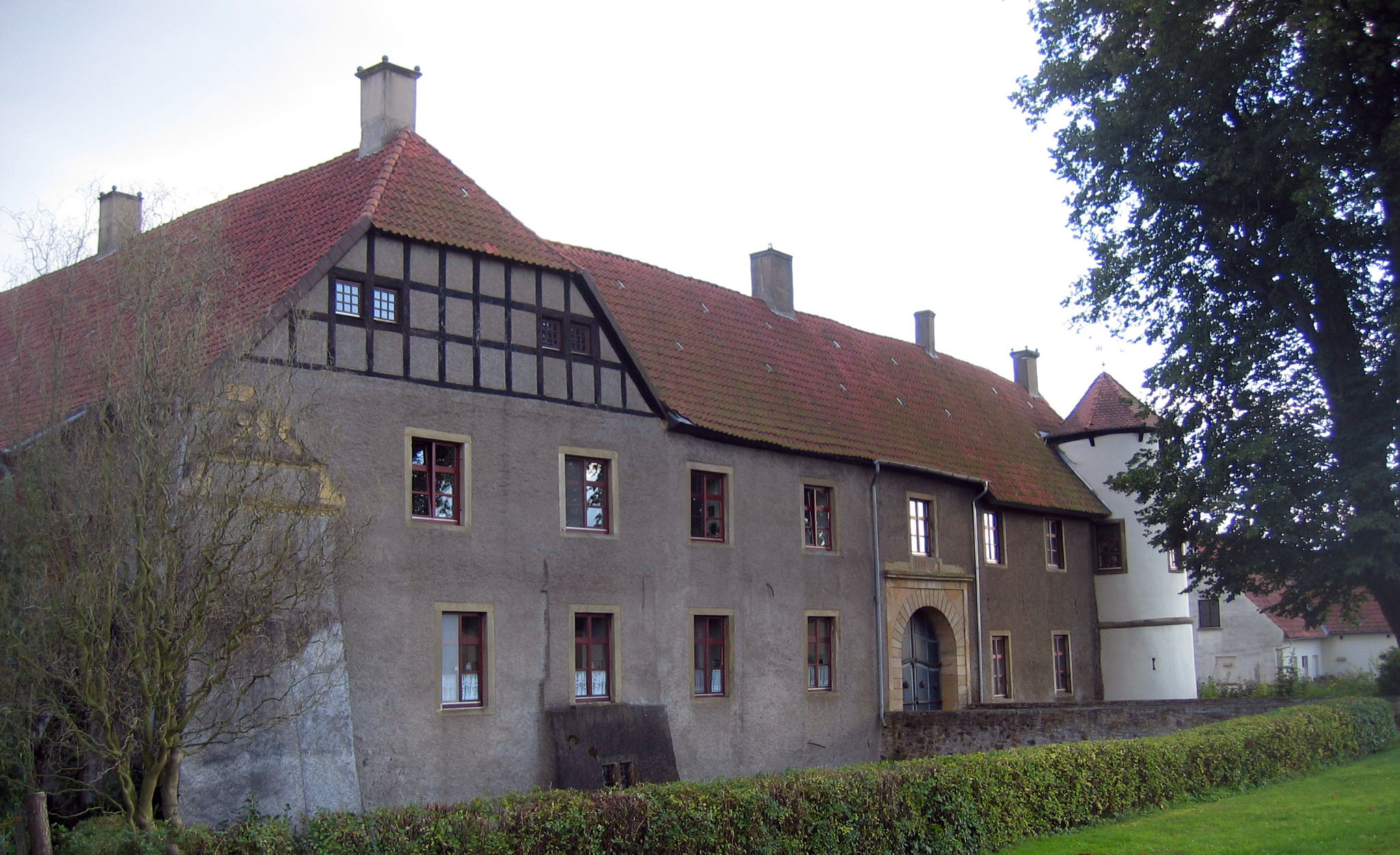
Haus Kilver
