= Husen Castle (Syburg) =

Medieval tower house of a castle

Burg Husen
- Haus Husen
- Dortmund-Syburg
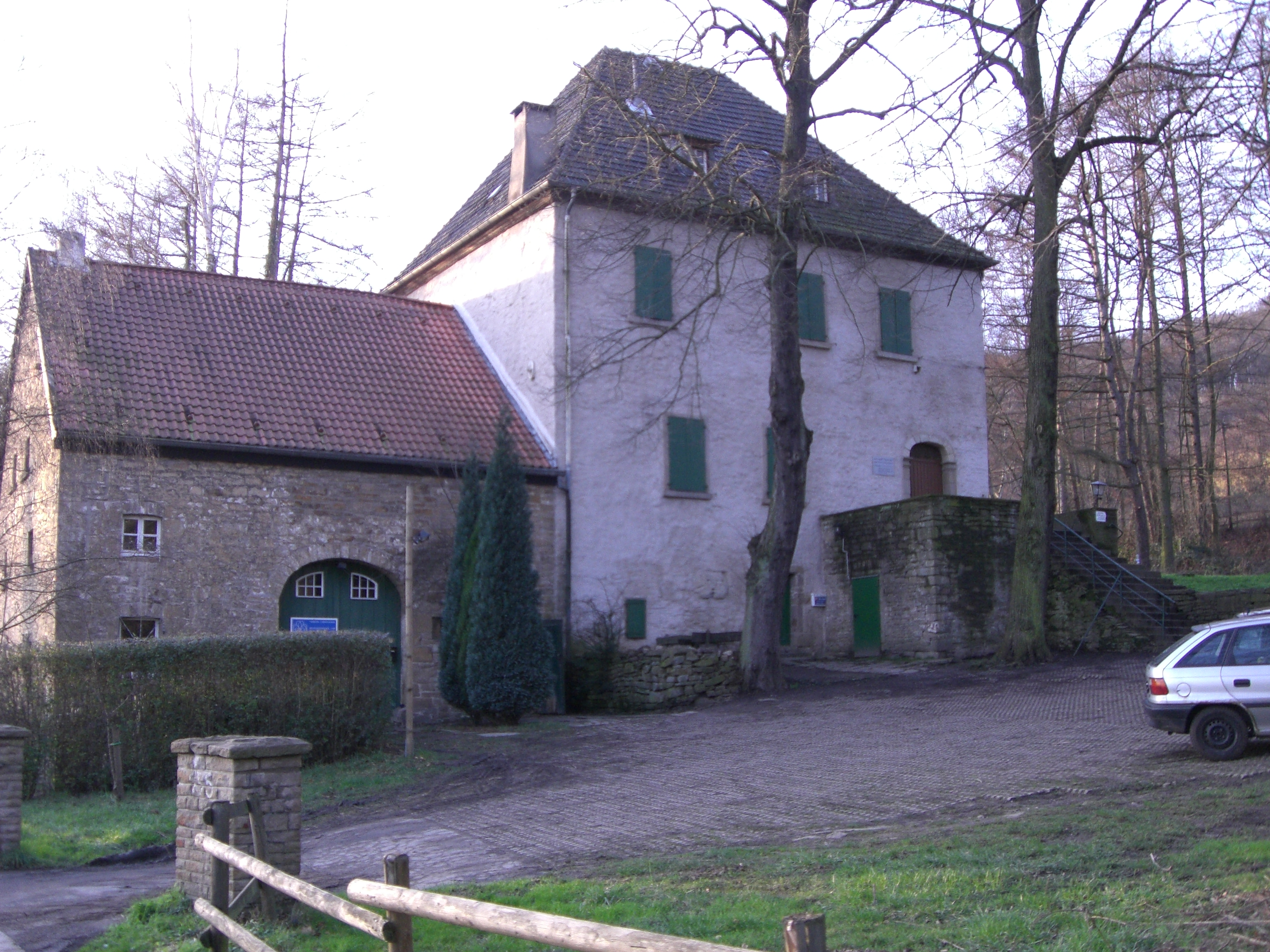
- Tower house of Husen House

Site information
- Code: DE-NW

Location
- Location within North Rhine-Westphalia Location within Germany
- Coordinates: 51°25′08″N 7°30′19″E

Site history
- Built: 13th century

Husen Castle (Burg Husen) is a medieval tower house of a castle in the Dortmund borough of Syburg in North Rhine-Westphalia.

The origins of the site go back to the 13th century. The present shape of the tower house dates to the 17th century. It is included in the list of monuments of the city of Dortmund as a listed building.

The estate with its pastures and stands of trees that belongs to Syburg is about 7,000 m^{2} in area and lies in the triangle formed by the cities of Dortmund, Schwerte and Hagen.

The Verband Christlicher Pfadfinderinnen und Pfadfinder (VCP) of Westphalia Land took over the castle in 1984 and uses it as a youth holiday home with and youth campsite.
