= Wichlinghofen =

Human settlement in Germany

Coordinates: 51°27′04″N 7°29′26″E

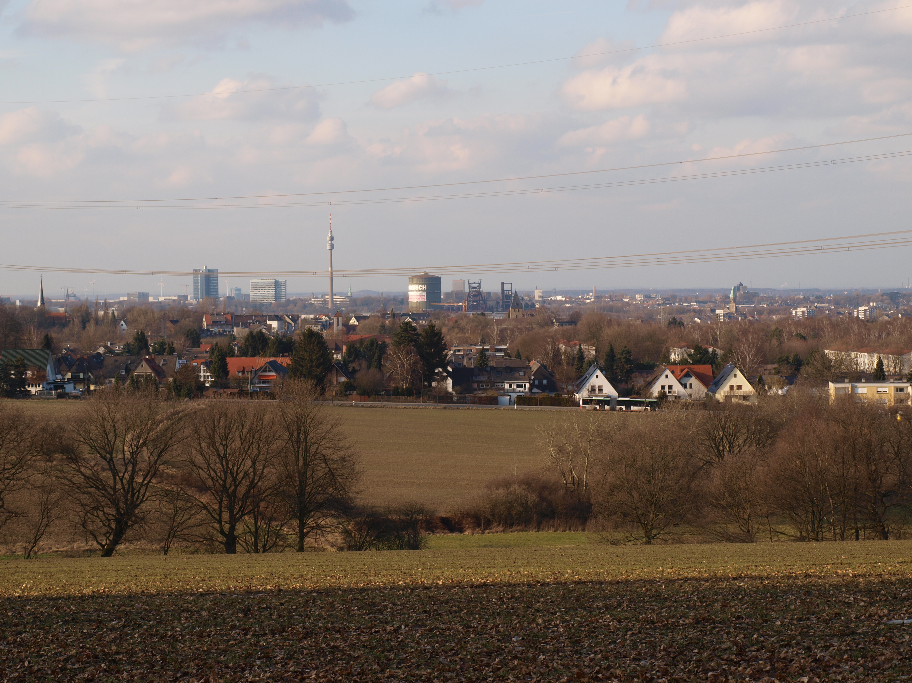
View to Dortmund from Wichlinghofen

Wichlinghofen (German pronunciation: [vɪçlɪŋˈhoːfn̩]) is a Stadtteil (Quarter) in the south of the city of Dortmund, in Germany. With its 3,500 inhabitants it is like a separate village in the city.

The city is building a rain retention basin in Wichlinghofen.
