= Georg von Vincke =

Germany aristocrat (1811–1875)

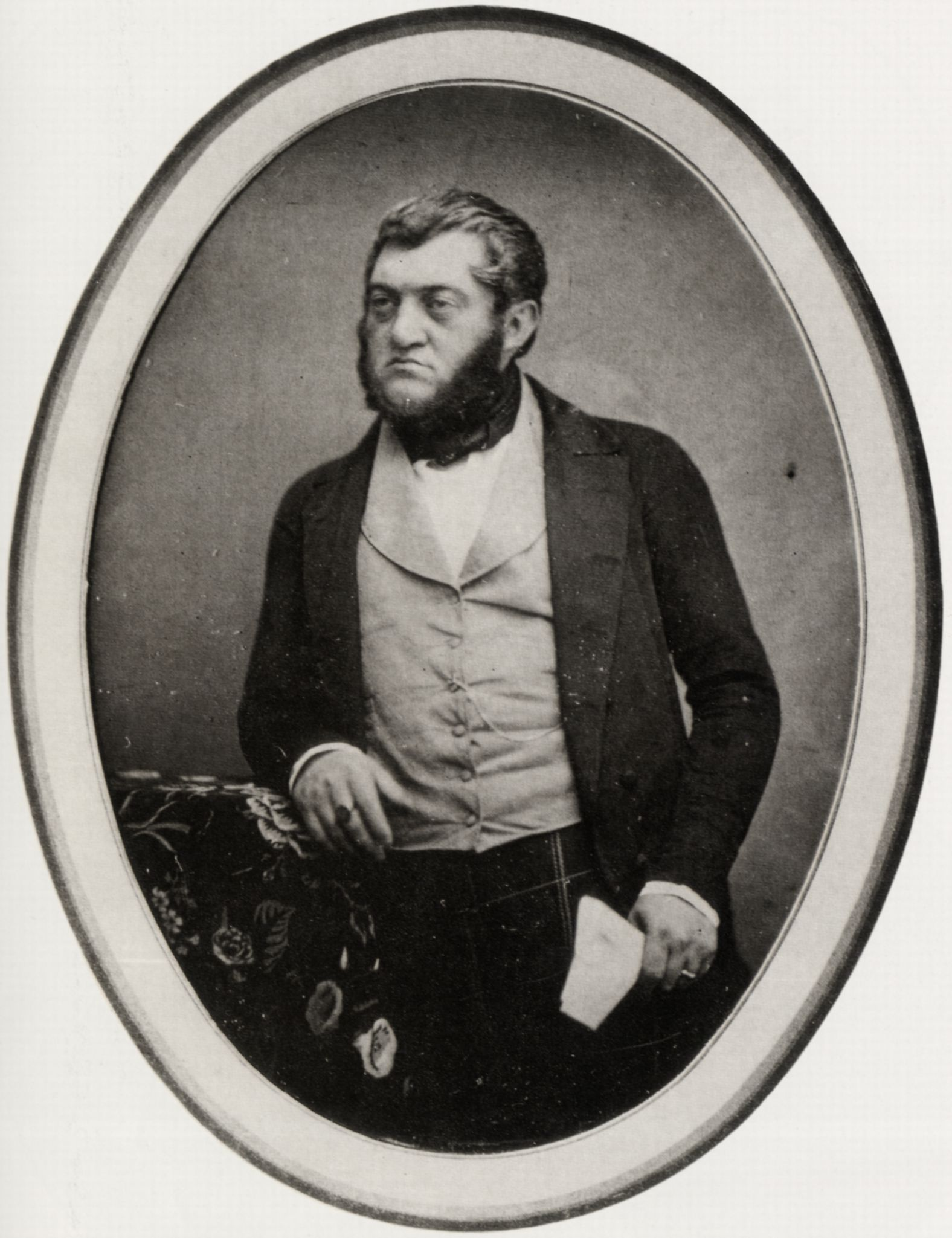
Georg von Vincke, 1848

Georg von Vincke (5 May 1811 – 3 June 1875) was a Prussian politician, officer, landowner and aristocrat. As a political figure he was associated with the Old Liberals.

== Early life ==
He was born in Hagen, as a member of an old Westphalian noble Vincke family. He was the eldest son of Ludwig von Vincke and his first wife, Eleonore von Syberg (1788–1826).

== Biography ==
He studied law at the University of Berlin and the University of Göttingen, served one volunteer year in the army, and then worked at courts in Berlin, Minden and Münster. From 1837 to 1848 he was District President of Hagen. In 1843 he was a member of the Westphalian Provincial Assembly and in 1847 in the United Diet (Vereinigter Landtag). From 20 May 1848 to 24 May 1849 he was a member for 13 Westphalian constituencies in the Frankfurt Parliament, where he joined the Café Milani faction. He served in several other representative institutions.

At first he was a supporter of the conservative factions, but from 1852 he increasingly supported the left, and was one of the main opponents of Otto Theodor von Manteuffel. From 1867 to 1869 Vincke was a deputy in the parliament of the North German Confederation.

He is regarded as one of the greatest Prussian orators of his time.

In 1852 he dueled with Otto von Bismarck; the duel ended without injury to either man.

He was known for his anti-Polish stance, and his unusually direct and candid statement in the German parliament – "The existence of the Prussian state depends on the Polish state never existing again" – was widely quoted by, among others, The Times in March 1863 (at the time of the Polish January Uprising) and by Karl Marx in his work on German–Polish relations.

Vincke died in Bad Oeynhausen.
