= Hengsteysee =

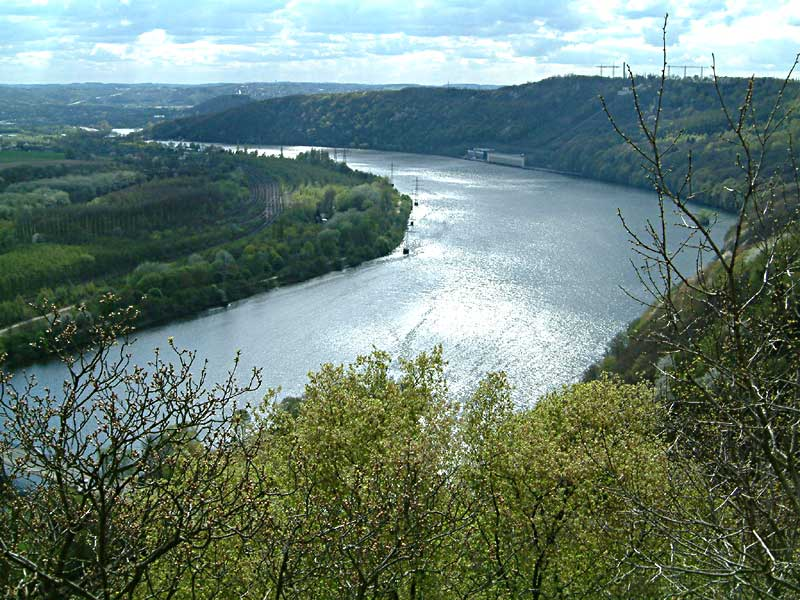
- Interactive map of Hengsteysee
- Country: Germany
- Location: North Rhine-Westphalia
- Coordinates: 51°24′50″N 07°27′43″E
- Construction began: 1927
- Opening date: 1929

Reservoir
- Total capacity: 3.3 hm^{3} (120×10^{6} cu ft)
- Surface area: 1.36 km^{2} (0.53 sq mi)

The Hengsteysee (Lake Hengstey) is a reservoir on the Ruhr river between the cities of Hagen, Dortmund and Herdecke, North Rhine-Westphalia, Germany. It was built in 1929 and is one of five reservoirs on the Ruhr.

The reservoir is about 4.2 km (2.6 mi) long and has an average width of 296 meters (971 ft). It begins near the point where the Lenne flows into the Ruhr, and ends with the weir and hydroelectric plant of Hengsteysee. The Klusenberg, a hill that is part of the Ardey range, is located just north of the Hengsteysee. There is also a pumped-storage plant on this reservoir (called the Koepchenwerk after Arthur Koepchen), along with a 4.5 MWh grid services battery repurposed from electric cars.

Hengsteysee fulfills the following four functions:

- functions as the lower reservoir of the Koepchenwerk pumped-storage plant
- performs biological purification of water from the Lenne
- deposit of sediment from the Lenne
- venue for water sports and tourism

== Water sports ==
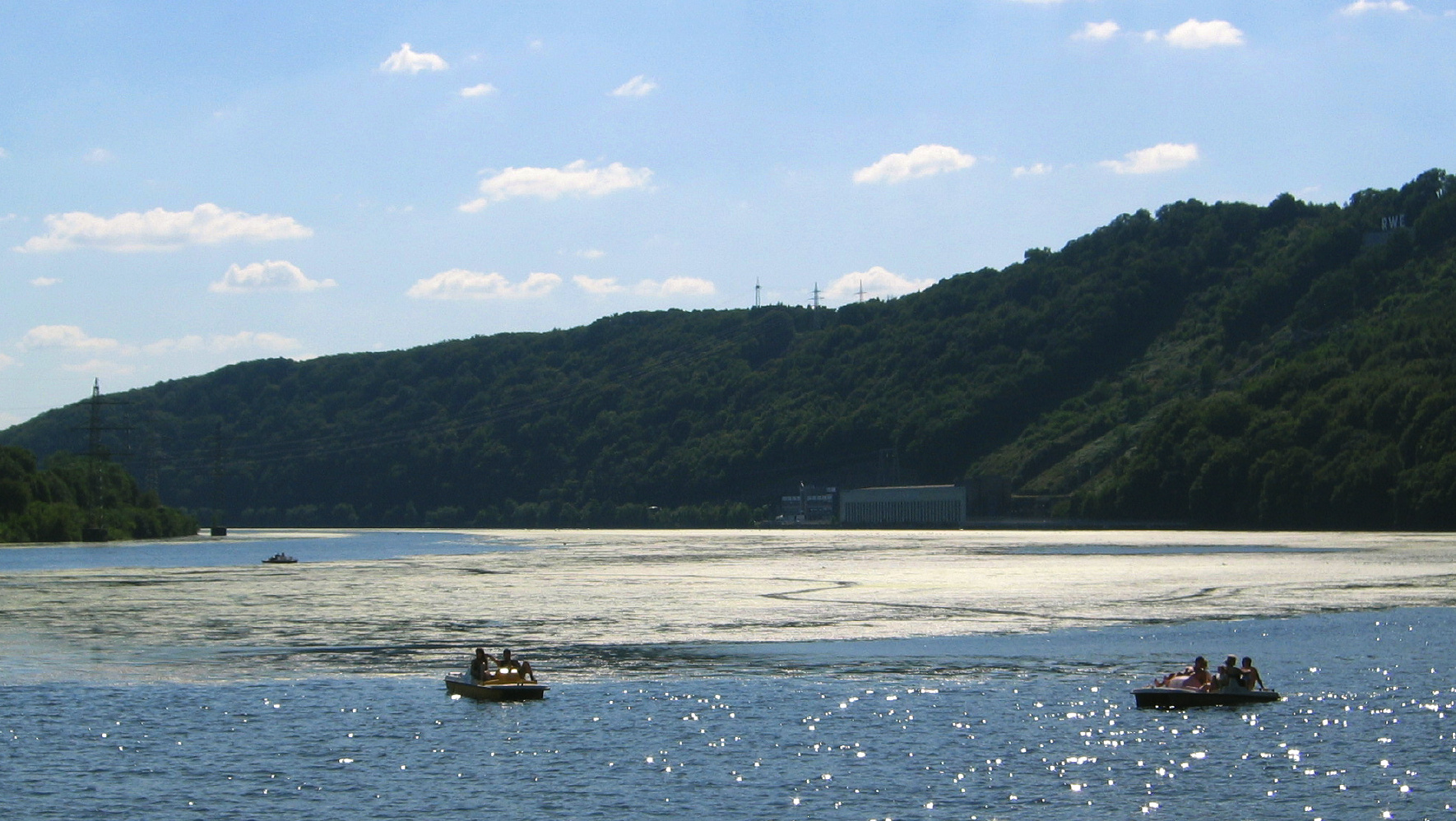
Large waterweed populations have made recreational use difficult since the 1990s.

The Hengsteysee is a water sports area, especially for sailing, rowing and canoeing. Several sports clubs are based on the lake shore: the Hengsteysee Sailing Club (SGHS), Dortmund University Sailing Club (USC), the sailing group of the Hagen Disabled Sports Association (BSG) with its boathouse on Seestraße, the Syburg Sailing Club, the Hagen Canoe Club and the Dortmund Sports Club (Freier Sportverein Dortmund 1898, FS 98). The DLRG groups of the county of Dortmund (there is a water rescue station on Hengsteystrasse) and OG Hagen (water rescue station on Seestrasse) ensure safety on the water.

However, the Hengsteysee is unsuitable for swimming and bathing - it is not a bathing lake, and the water quality of the Ruhr is not good enough for a suitable permit. The health department has also expressly warned against this since September 2008, when several people had to seek medical treatment after coming into contact with the lake water.

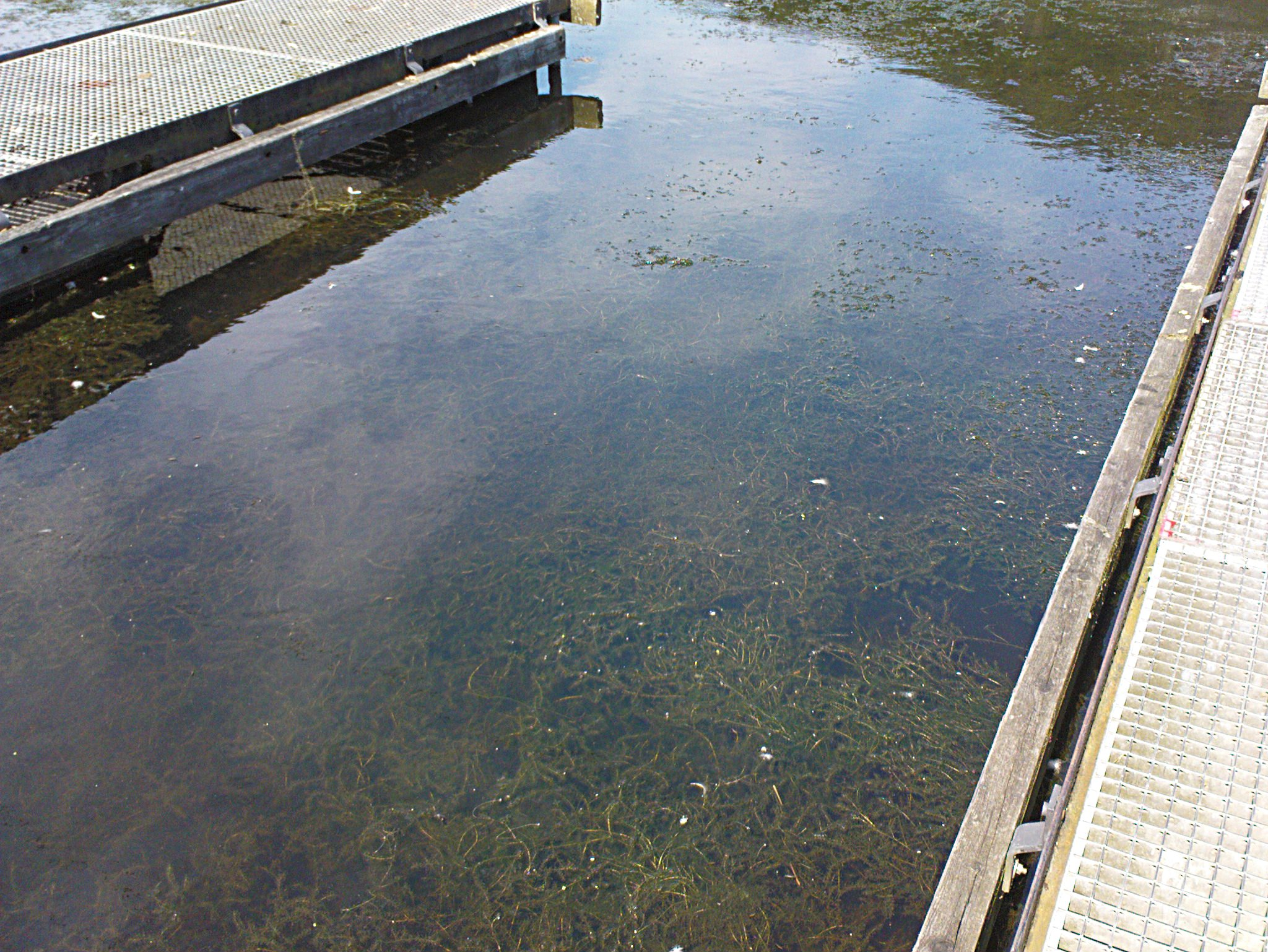
An overgrown slipway in 2008

Due to the low water depth (less than 50 cm in some places) at times and especially due to the mass proliferation of the waterweed Elodea in summer since the late 1990s, water sports on the Hengsteysee have been severely curtailed.
