= Gevelsberg Hauptbahnhof =

Railway halt in Gevelsberg, Germany

Gevelsberg Hbf
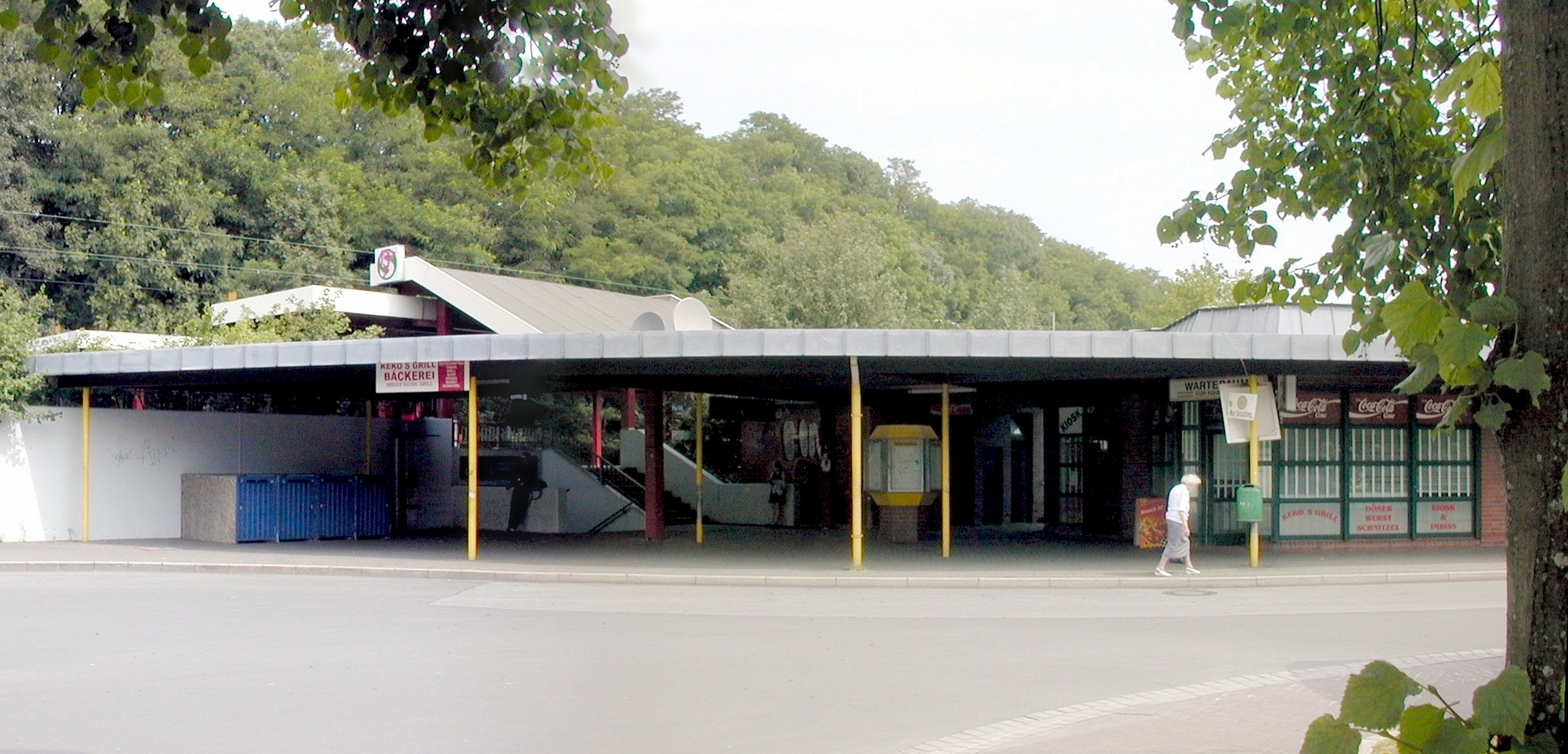

General information
- Location: Jahnstraße 12, Gevelsberg, NRW; Germany
- Coordinates: 51°19′26″N 7°20′22″E
- Line: Düsseldorf-Derendorf–Dortmund Süd

Construction
- Accessible: Platform 1 only

Other information
- Station code: 2113
- DS100 code: EGVH
- IBNR: 8002267
- Category: 6
- Fare zone: VRR: 679
- Website: www.bahnhof.de

History
- Opened: 15 September 1879

Services
Preceding station	Rhine-Ruhr S-Bahn	Following station
Gevelsberg-Kipp towards Mönchengladbach Hbf	S8	Gevelsberg-Knapp towards Hagen Hbf
Gevelsberg-Kipp towards Haltern am See or Recklinghausen Hbf	S9	Gevelsberg-Knapp towards Hagen Hbf
Location

Gevelsberg Hauptbahnhof (German for Gevelsberg main station) is a railway station in the municipality of Gevelsberg in the German state of North Rhine-Westphalia. The station was opened along with a section of the Düsseldorf-Derendorf–Dortmund Süd railway, opened by the Rhenish Railway Company (German: Rheinische Eisenbahn-Gesellschaft, RhE) between Wuppertal-Wichlinghausen and Hagen RhE station (now Hagen-Eckesey depot) on 15 September 1879. It has two platform tracks and it is classified by Deutsche Bahn as a category 6 station. It is the only Hauptbahnhof in Germany, which in fact is not a Bahnhof, but a Haltepunkt ("halt", defined in Germany as having no sets of points). It and Remscheid Hauptbahnhof are the only Hauptbahnhof stations which are served only by S-Bahn trains.

== Operational usage ==
The station is served by Rhine-Ruhr S-Bahn line S8 between Mönchengladbach and Hagen and line S9 between Recklinghausen and Hagen, both every 60 minutes. The station, along with Remscheid Hauptbahnhof are the only Hauptbahnhof stations in Germany that are served exclusively by S-Bahn trains. This is because Gevelsberg as a municipality is a relatively recent creation, and traditionally Ennepetal (Gevelsberg) on the direct line from Wuppertal to Hagen carries most of the regional and mid-distance traffic for Ennepetal and Gevelsberg. Whilst Gevelsberg Hbf therefore is more central to Gevelsberg, it does not offer any connections other than the S8 and S9 trains running twice an hour, making it one of the least busy Hauptbahnhof stations in Germany.

The station is also served by the following bus services:

Line no	Terminals and important stops	Operator
SB 38	Ennepetal Busbahnhof − Gevelsberg Mitte − Gevelsberg Hauptbahnhof − Silschede Mitte − Wetter Bf − Witten Hauptbahnhof − Hattingen Mitte Bahnhof	Verkehrsgesellschaft Ennepe-Ruhr
542	Gevelsberg Hauptbahnhof − Haspe Zentrum − Hagen Hauptbahnhof − HA-Stadtmitte − Loxbaum − Boele Markt − Kabel	Hagener Straßenbahn
551	(Hiddinghausen −) Haßlinghausen Busbahnhof − Sprockhövel-Uellendahl − Gevelsberg Hauptbahnhof − GEV-Mitte − Ennepetal (Gevelsberg) Bf − EN-Busbahnhof − Klutert − Ennepetal Voerde	Verkehrsgesellschaft Ennepe-Ruhr
552	Wetter Loh − Silschede − Gevelsberg Hauptbahnhof − Gevelsberg Mitte − GEV-Rathaus/Lusebrink	Verkehrsgesellschaft Ennepe-Ruhr
556	Gevelsberg Knapp Bf − Gevelsberg Hauptbahnhof − Schwelm HELIOS Klinikum − Schwelm Bahnhof − Schwelm Blücherstraße	Verkehrsgesellschaft Ennepe-Ruhr
563	EN-Busbahnhof − Ennepetal (Gev.) Bf − Gevelsberg Hauptbahnhof − Gevelsberg Elsernstraße	Verkehrsgesellschaft Ennepe-Ruhr
NE3	Gevelsberg Hauptbahnhof − Haspe Zentrum − Hagen Hauptbahnhof − HA-Stadtmitte	Hagener Straßenbahn
NE27	Haßlinghausen Busbahnhof − Sprockhövel-Uellendahl − Gevelsberg Hauptbahnhof − GEV-Mitte − Ennepetal (Gevelsberg) Bf − EN-Busbahnhof − Klutert − Ennepetal Voerde	Verkehrsgesellschaft Ennepe-Ruhr
