= Witten–Schwelm railway =

Largely abandoned railway line in North Rhine-Westphalia, Germany

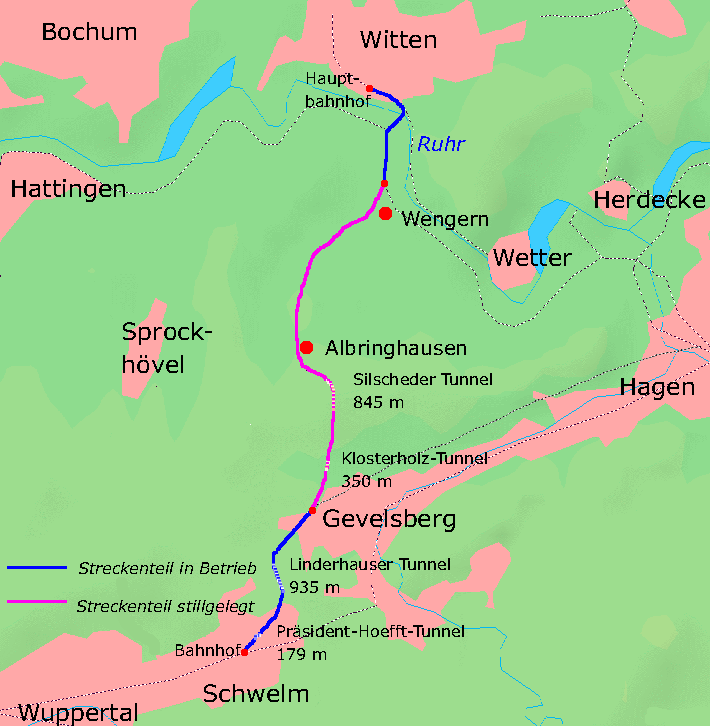

Overview
- Line number: 2143 (Witten–Schwelm); 2144 (Witten Höhe–Wengern Ost)
- Locale: North Rhine-Westphalia, Germany

Service
- Route number: 450.8 (Gevelsberg West–Schwelm)

Technical
- Line length: 4.6 km (2.9 mi) and 19.7 km (12.2 mi)
- Number of tracks: 2 (Witten–Wengern Ost and Gevelsberg West–Schwelm)
- Track gauge: 1,435 mm (4 ft 8 1/2 in) standard gauge
- Electrification: 15 kV/16.7 Hz AC overhead catenary (Witten–Wengern Ost and Gevelsberg West–Schwelm)
- Operating speed: 100 km/h (62.1 mph) (max)

The Witten–Schwelm railway (also called the Elbschetalbahn, Elbsche Valley Railway) is a now disused railway line, except for short sections at each end located in the Ennepe-Ruhr-Kreis, a district in the southeastern Ruhr area in the German state of North Rhine-Westphalia.

The 4.6 km long double-track and electrified section from Witten Hauptbahnhof to Wengern Ost is now used for the transport of freight.

The 17 km long and single-track section from Witten-Höhe to Schwelm was intended to be a part of a relief route from the Ruhr to Cologne. It was envisaged that the line to Schwelm would have been extended to the south via Lennep (near Remscheid) to Cologne, but this was not completed due to the outbreak of the First World War.

== History ==
Work on the line began in 1911 and although ultimately only part of the original plan was completed, this was delayed until 1934. Thus Deutsche Reichsbahn opened the first section from the Witten Hauptbahnhof via Witten-Höhe to Wengern Ost on 4 October 1926 with connections to the Ruhr Valley Railway from Hattingen to Hagen. It was then used exclusively for freight for about ten years, relieving the Elberfeld–Dortmund railway.

The economic decline during and after the war was the reason for the drawn-out construction of the main part of the line, with most works carried out before 1914. The necessary work to complete the line was implemented in the early 1930s as a job creation measure. The cost of building the line eventually amounted to 50 million Reichsmarks.

In the period from 1934 to 1939, a total of 23 passenger trains, including five express trains, operated on the line daily. In addition, there was a considerable amount of freight.

During the Second World War, the Silschede Tunnel and the Klosterholz Tunnel were used under the code names Buchfink and Goldammer as underground factories under the U-Verlagerung Program for the production of weapons, using forced labour.

The operation of the railway was resumed after 1945, but traffic decreased steadily in the postwar period. As a result of this decrease, passenger services were closed on the middle section from Witten-Höhe via Wengern West and Albringhausen to Gevelsberg West on 30 November 1979. All traffic on this section ended on 14 January 1980 and the line was formally closed on 1 January 1983.

== Route ==
The line included some elaborate viaducts and railway tunnels, which included the Ruhr viaduct near Witten. More viaducts could be found in Wengern over the Elbsche and in Gevelsberg. There were two 900 m-long tunnels located at Silschede and north of Schwelm.

The line was well constructed from a technical perspective with:

- double track
- low gradients
- large curve radii
- large tunnel cross-sections
- no level crossings.

It was planned to what were considered European standards. Nevertheless, only part of the planned route was built.

== Current situation ==
The northern part of the route is now again used only for freight, while the southern portion through the 945 m long Linderhausen Tunnel from Gevelsberg to Schwelm is used by S-Bahn line S 8 and S 9 of the Verkehrsverbund Rhein-Ruhr (Rhine-Ruhr Transport Association) to link the Düsseldorf-Derendorf–Dortmund Süd railway and the Elberfeld–Dortmund railway.

== Planning ==
It is planned to build a cycle path on the disused part of the line. The route runs through a scenic area with two viaducts and two tunnels, including the 845 m-long Silschede Tunnel, which would be extraordinary long for a tunnel on a cycle path. Because of these structures, however, the financing of the project is not yet clear, since, for example, the lighting of the tunnel would cause substantial costs.

Part of the route has already been upgraded for a section of the “From Ruhr to Ruhr” cycleway (Von-Ruhr-zur-Ruhr-Radweg).

== Henriette Davidis ==
During the construction of the line, the house in which Henriette Davidis worked for a long time had to be demolished. The plate of the stove on which many of her recipes were developed was installed in the wall of a small bridge. The bridge can be found on Henriette-Davidis-Weg in Wengern.

== Gallery ==
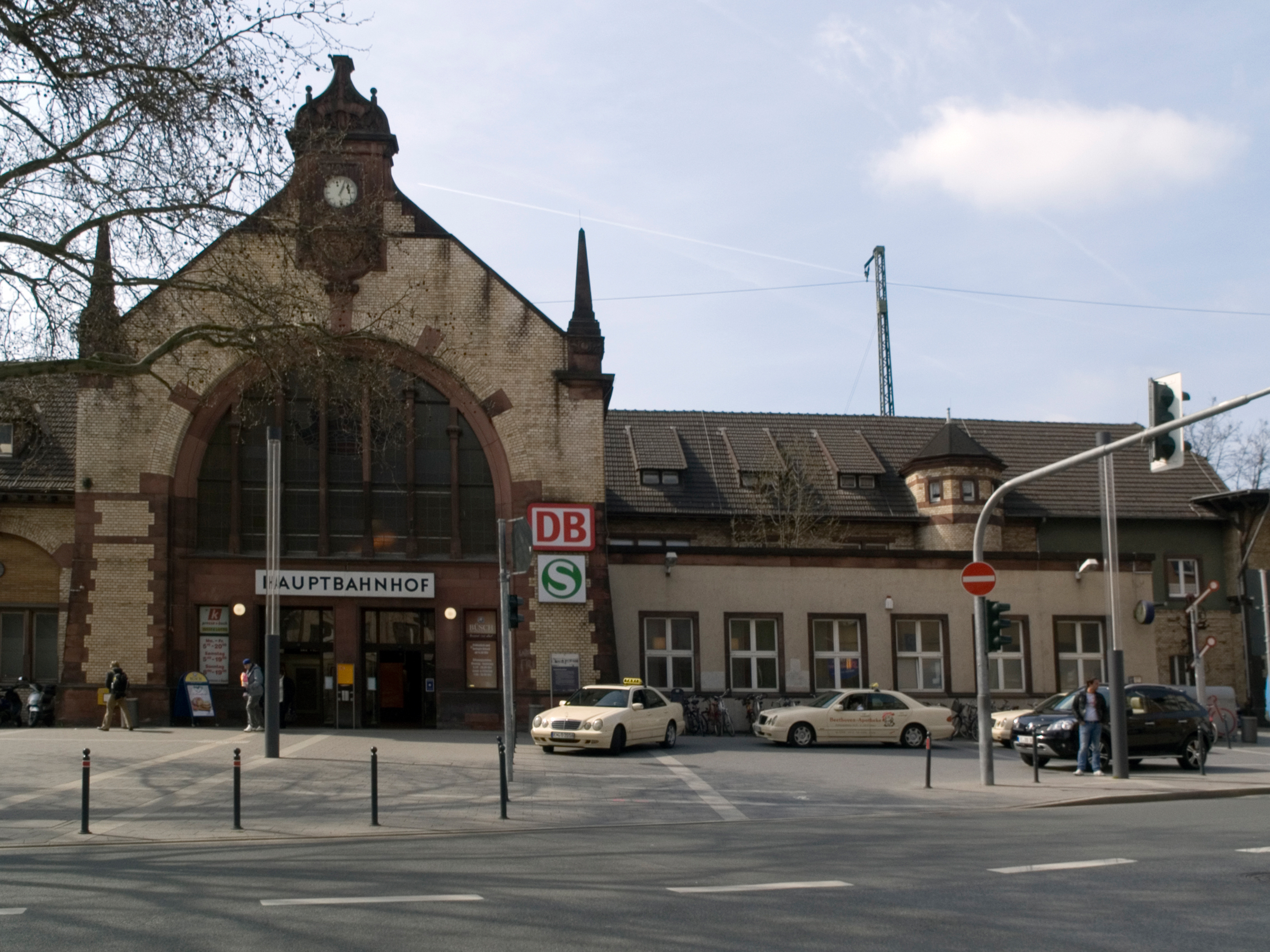
Witten Hauptbahnhof

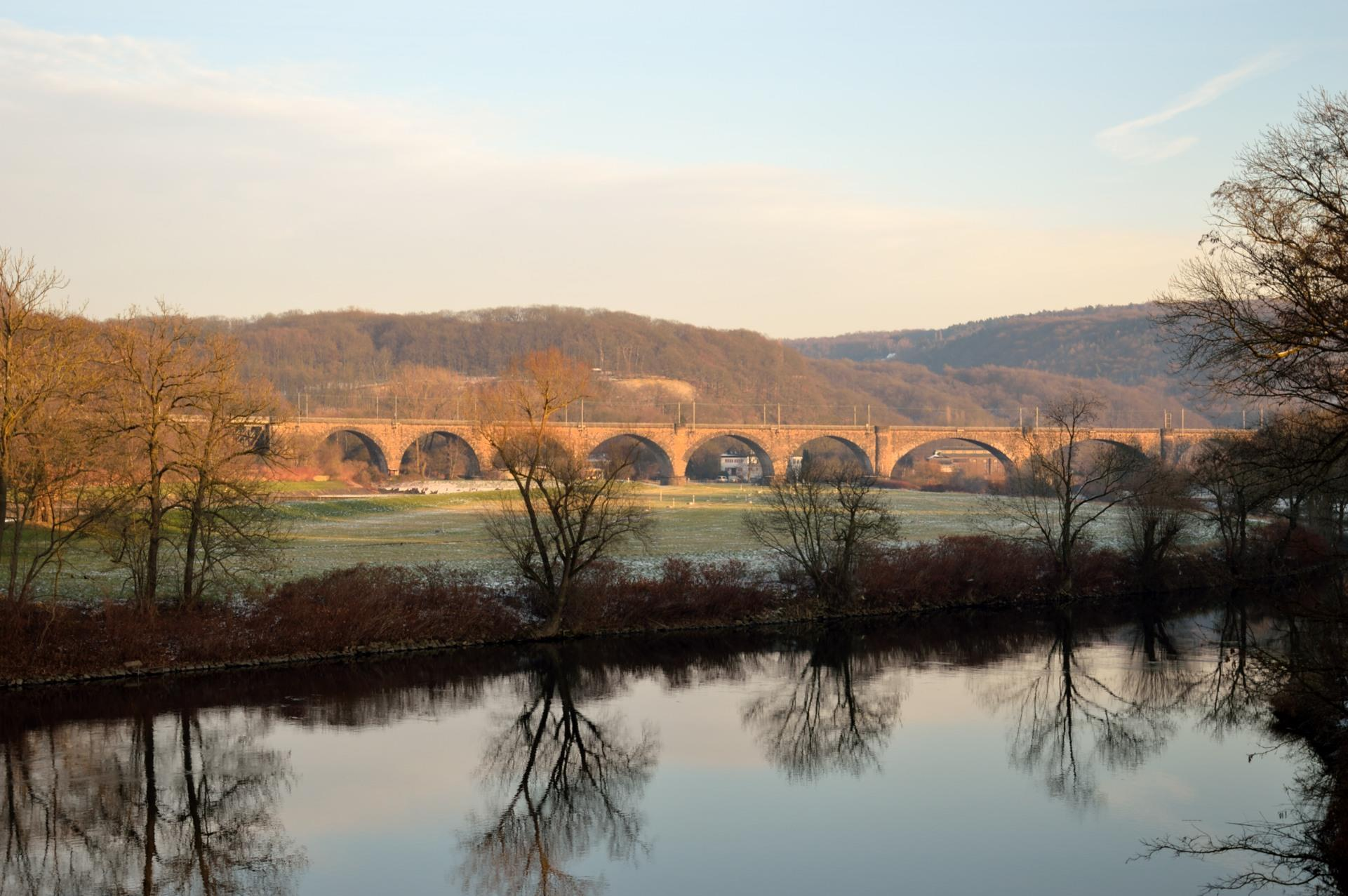
Ruhr valley viaduct near Witten

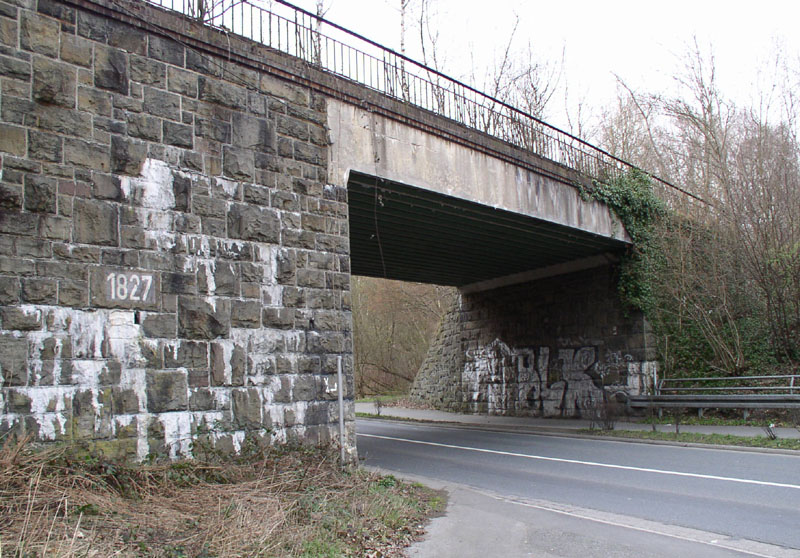
Underpass at Wengern

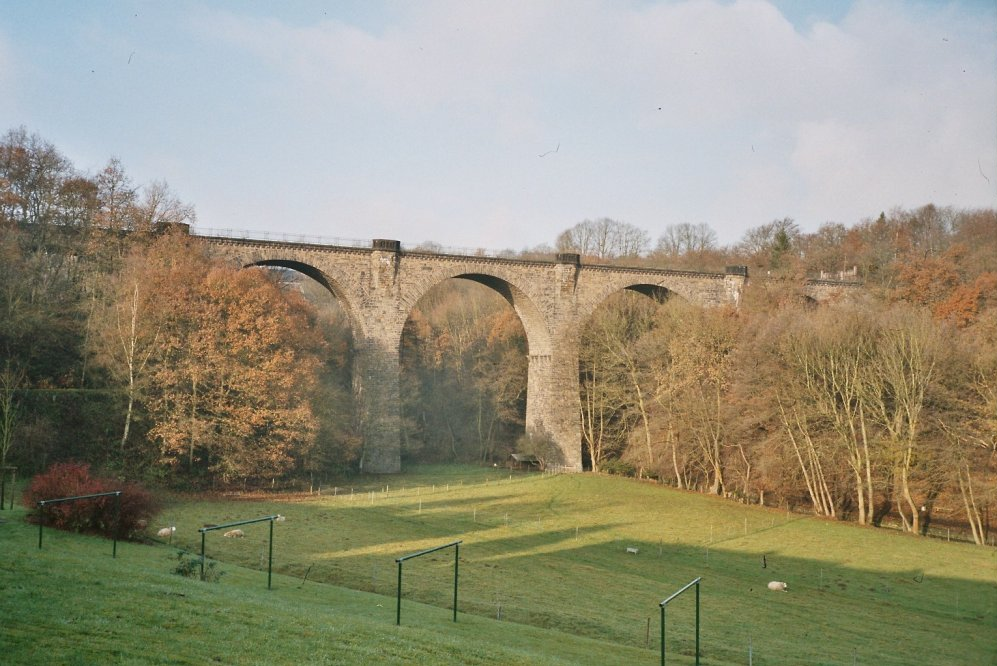
Elbschebach valley viaduct near Wengern

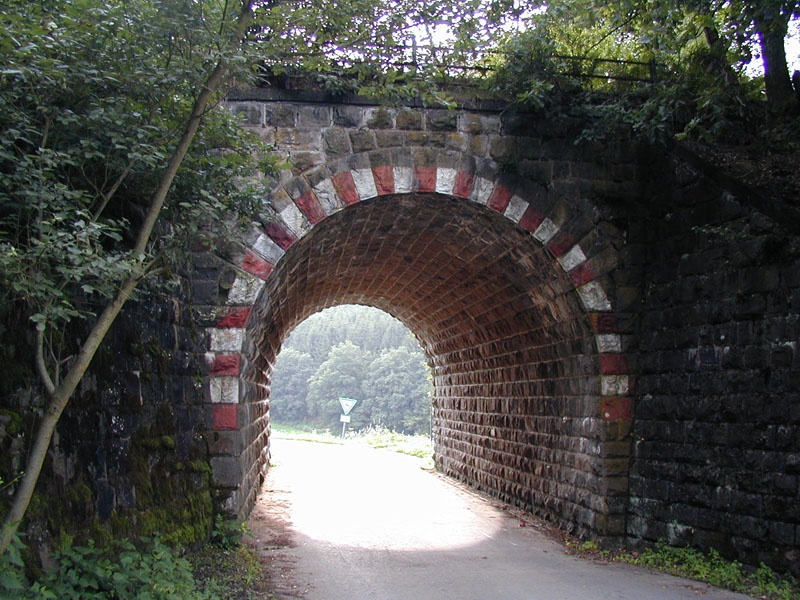
One of three typical underpasses in the Elbsche valley

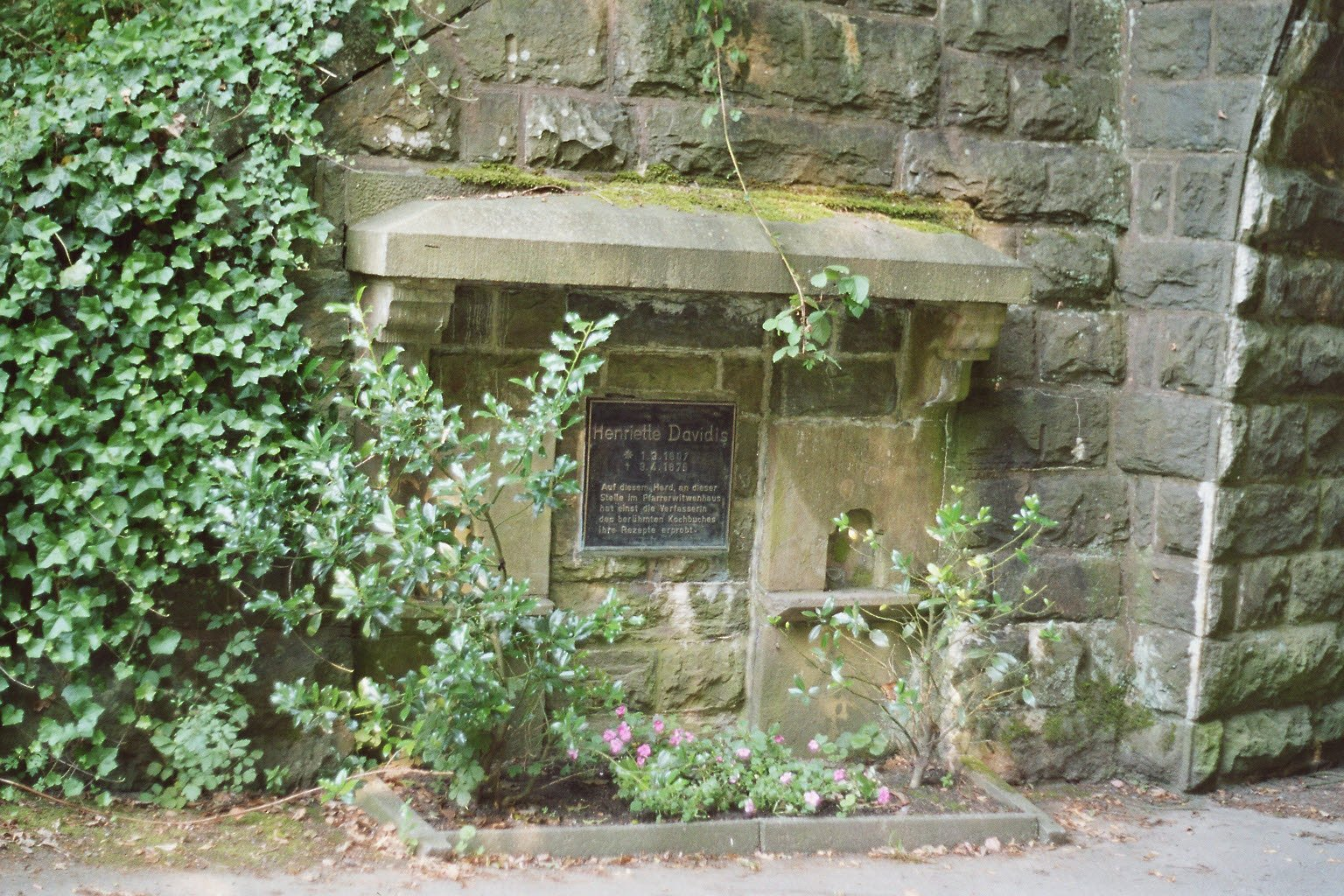
Cooking plate used as a plaque for Henriette Davidis

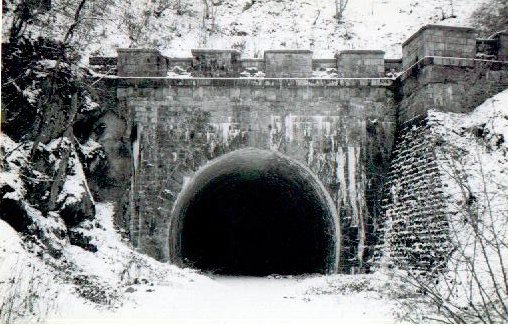
North portal of the Silschede Tunnel

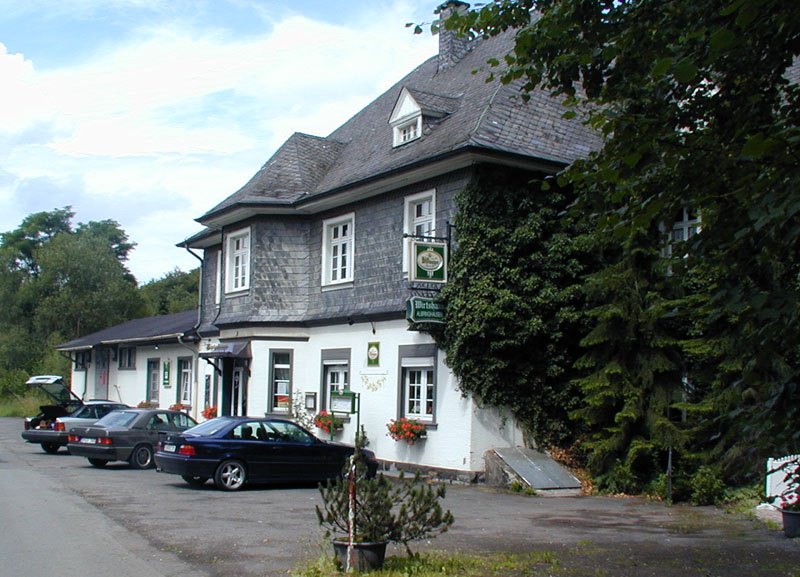
Station building of Albringhausen

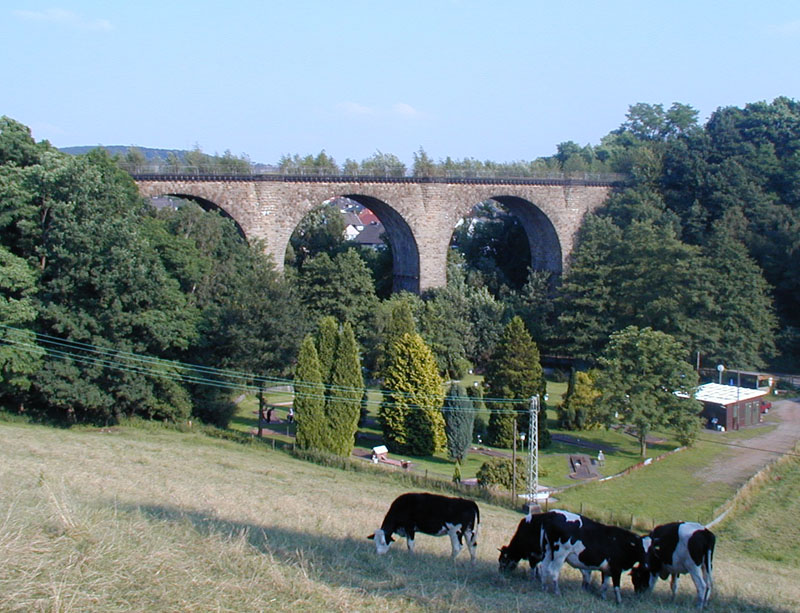
Stefansbach valley viaduct in Gevelsberg

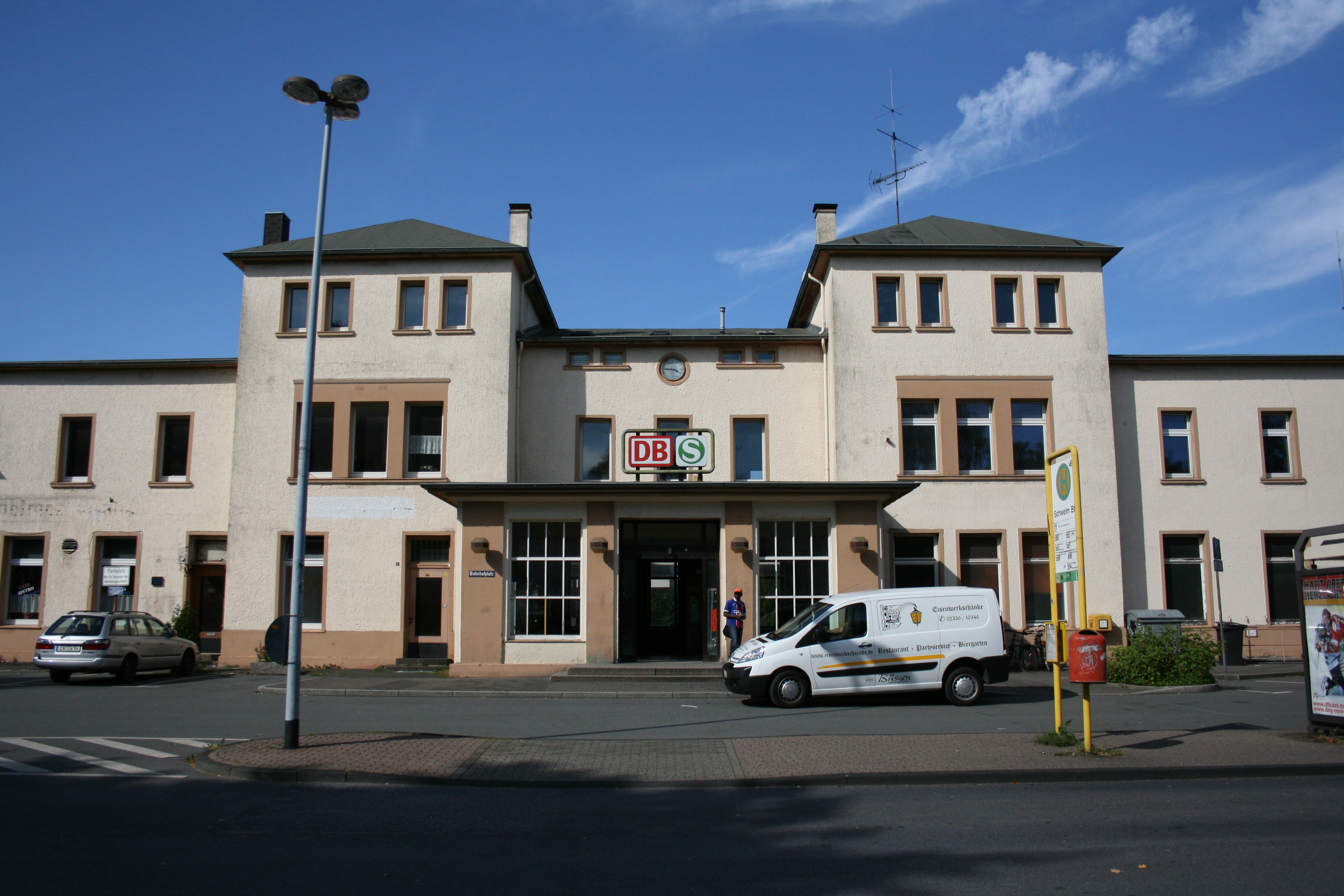
Schwelm station
