= Gevelsberg-Kipp station =

Railway station in Germany

Gevelsberg Kipp
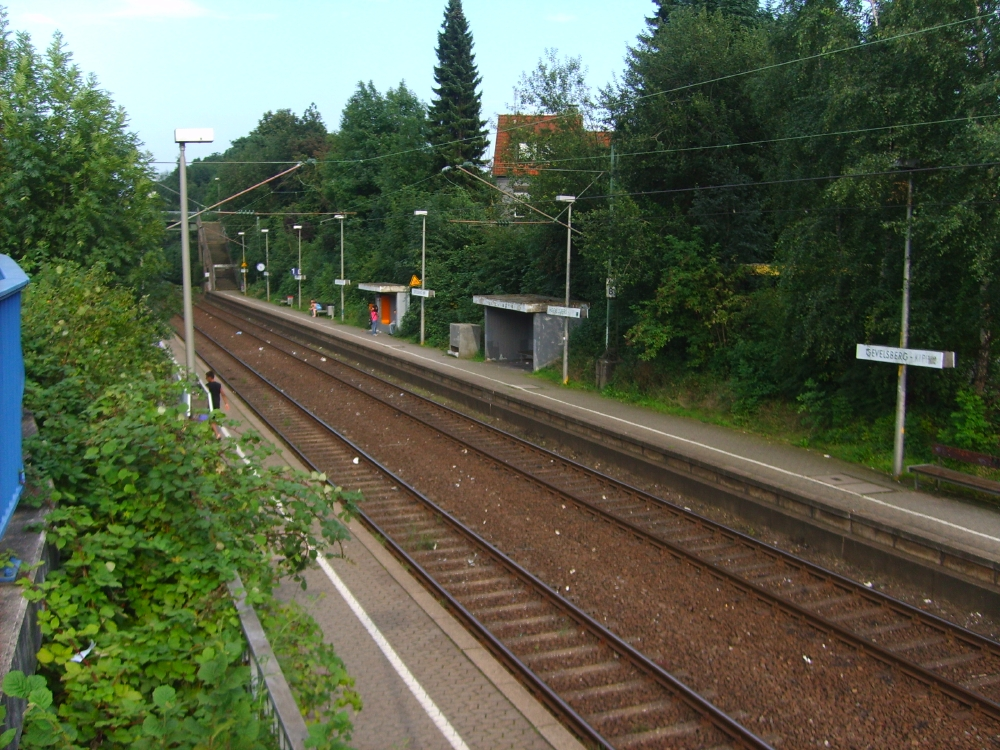

General information
- Location: Heidestr. 21; Gevelsberg, NRW; Germany
- Coordinates: 51°19′10″N 7°19′38″E
- Lines: D-Derendorf–Dortmund Süd (KBS 450.8)
- Platforms: 2

Construction
- Accessible: Yes

Other information
- Station code: 2115
- DS100 code: KGVK
- IBNR: 8002509
- Category: 6
- Fare zone: VRR: 679
- Website: www.bahnhof.de

History
- Opened: 1 June 1980

Services
Preceding station	Rhine-Ruhr S-Bahn	Following station
Gevelsberg West towards Mönchengladbach Hbf	S8	Gevelsberg Hbf towards Hagen Hbf
Gevelsberg West towards Haltern am See or Recklinghausen Hbf	S9	Gevelsberg Hbf towards Hagen Hbf
Location

Gevelsberg-Kipp station is a through station in the town of Gevelsberg in the German state of North Rhine-Westphalia. The station was opened on 1 June 1980 on a section of the Düsseldorf-Derendorf–Dortmund Süd railway, opened by the Rhenish Railway Company (German: Rheinische Eisenbahn-Gesellschaft, RhE) between Wuppertal-Wichlinghausen and Hagen RhE station (now Hagen-Eckesey depot) on 15 September 1879. It has two platform tracks and it is classified by Deutsche Bahn as a category 6 station.

The station is served by Rhine-Ruhr S-Bahn line S 8 between Mönchengladbach and Hagen and line S 9 between Recklinghausen and Hagen, both every 60 minutes.
