= Schwelm West station =

Railway station in Schwelm, Germany

Schwelm West
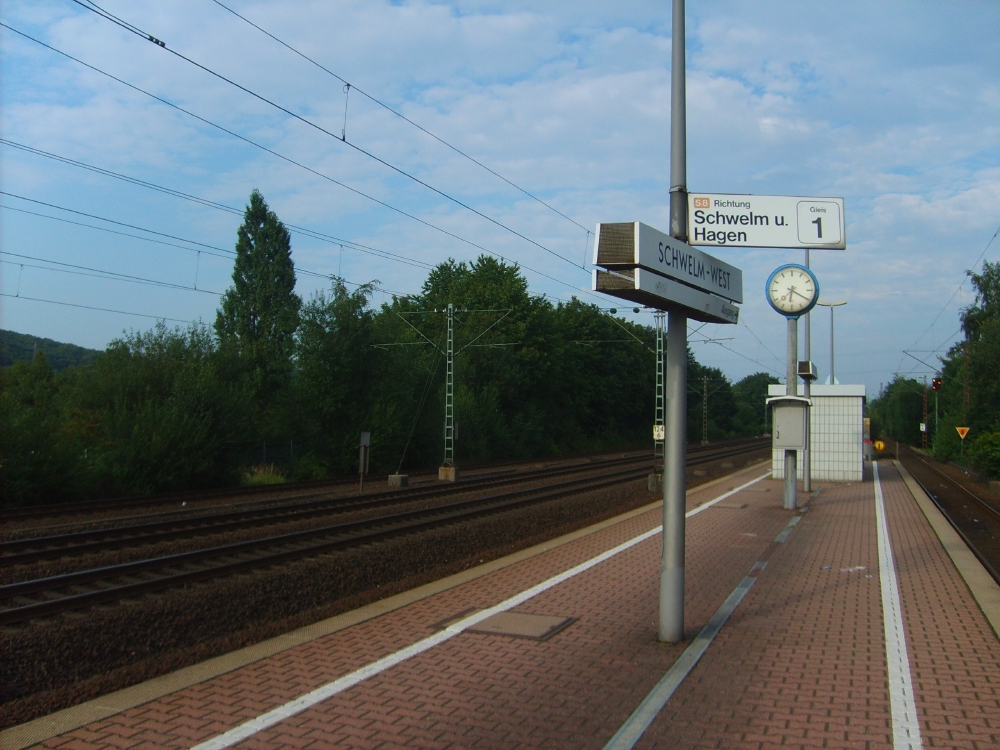

General information
- Location: Jessinghauserstr. 61; Schwelm, NRW; Germany
- Coordinates: 51°17′08″N 7°16′10″E
- Owner: DB Netz
- Operator: DB Station&Service
- Lines: Elberfeld–Dortmund (KBS 450.8)
- Platforms: 1 island platform
- Tracks: 2
- Train operators: DB Regio NRW

Construction
- Accessible: No

Other information
- Station code: 5750
- DS100 code: KSWW
- IBNR: 8005488
- Category: 6
- Fare zone: VRR: 678; VRS: 1670 (VRR transitional tariff)
- Website: www.bahnhof.de

History
- Opened: 29 May 1988

Services
Preceding station	Rhine-Ruhr S-Bahn	Following station
Wuppertal-Langerfeld towards Mönchengladbach Hbf	S8	Schwelm towards Hagen Hbf
Wuppertal-Langerfeld towards Haltern am See or Recklinghausen Hbf	S9	Schwelm towards Hagen Hbf
Location
- Location within North Rhine-Westphalia

Schwelm West station is a through station in the town of Schwelm in the German state of North Rhine-Westphalia. The station was opened on 29 May 1988 on a section of the Elberfeld–Dortmund railway from Döppersberg, near the current Wuppertal Hauptbahnhof, to Schwelm that was opened by the Bergisch-Märkische Railway Company on 9 October 1847. It has two platform tracks and it is classified by Deutsche Bahn as a category 6 station.

The station is served by Rhine-Ruhr S-Bahn line S 8 between Mönchengladbach and Hagen and line S 9 between Recklinghausen and Hagen, both every 60 minutes.
