= Wuppertal-Langerfeld station =

Railway station in Germany

Wuppertal Langerfeld
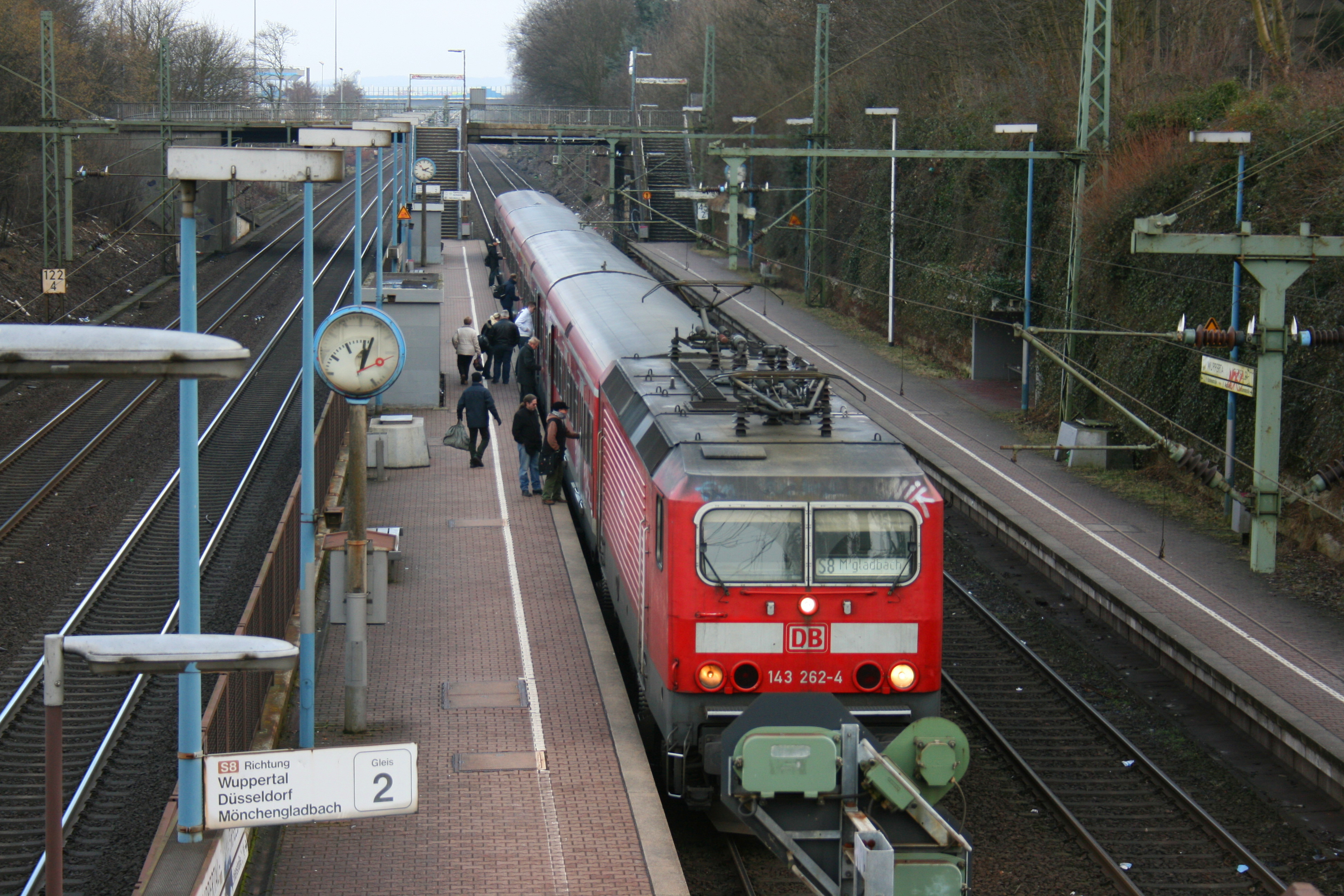

General information
- Location: Kohlenstr. 36, Wuppertal, NRW; Germany
- Coordinates: 51°16′40″N 7°14′34″E
- Owner: DB Netz
- Operator: DB Station&Service
- Lines: Elberfeld–Dortmund (KBS 450.8)
- Platforms: 2 side platforms
- Tracks: 4

Construction
- Accessible: No

Other information
- Station code: 6923
- DS100 code: KWLP
- IBNR: 8006607
- Category: 6
- Fare zone: VRR: 664; VRS: 1660 (VRR transitional tariff)
- Website: www.bahnhof.de

History
- Opened: 1948

Services
Preceding station	Rhine-Ruhr S-Bahn	Following station
Wuppertal-Oberbarmen towards Mönchengladbach Hbf	S8	Schwelm West towards Hagen Hbf
Wuppertal-Oberbarmen towards Haltern am See or Recklinghausen Hbf	S9	Schwelm West towards Hagen Hbf
Location
- Location within North Rhine-Westphalia

Wuppertal-Langerfeld station is a through station in the district of Langerfeld of the city of Wuppertal in the German state of North Rhine-Westphalia. The station was opened in 1948 on a section of the Elberfeld–Dortmund railway from Döppersberg, near the current Wuppertal Hauptbahnhof, to Schwelm that was opened by the Bergisch-Märkische Railway Company on 9 October 1847. It has two platform tracks and it is classified by Deutsche Bahn as a category 6 station.

The station is served by Rhine-Ruhr S-Bahn lines S 8 between Mönchengladbach and Hagen and S 9 between Recklinghausen and Hagen twice an hour (30 minutes alternatively).

It is also served by bus route 606 operated by Wuppertaler Stadtwerke every 60 minutes.
