= Gevelsberg-Knapp station =

Railway station in Germany

Gevelsberg Knapp
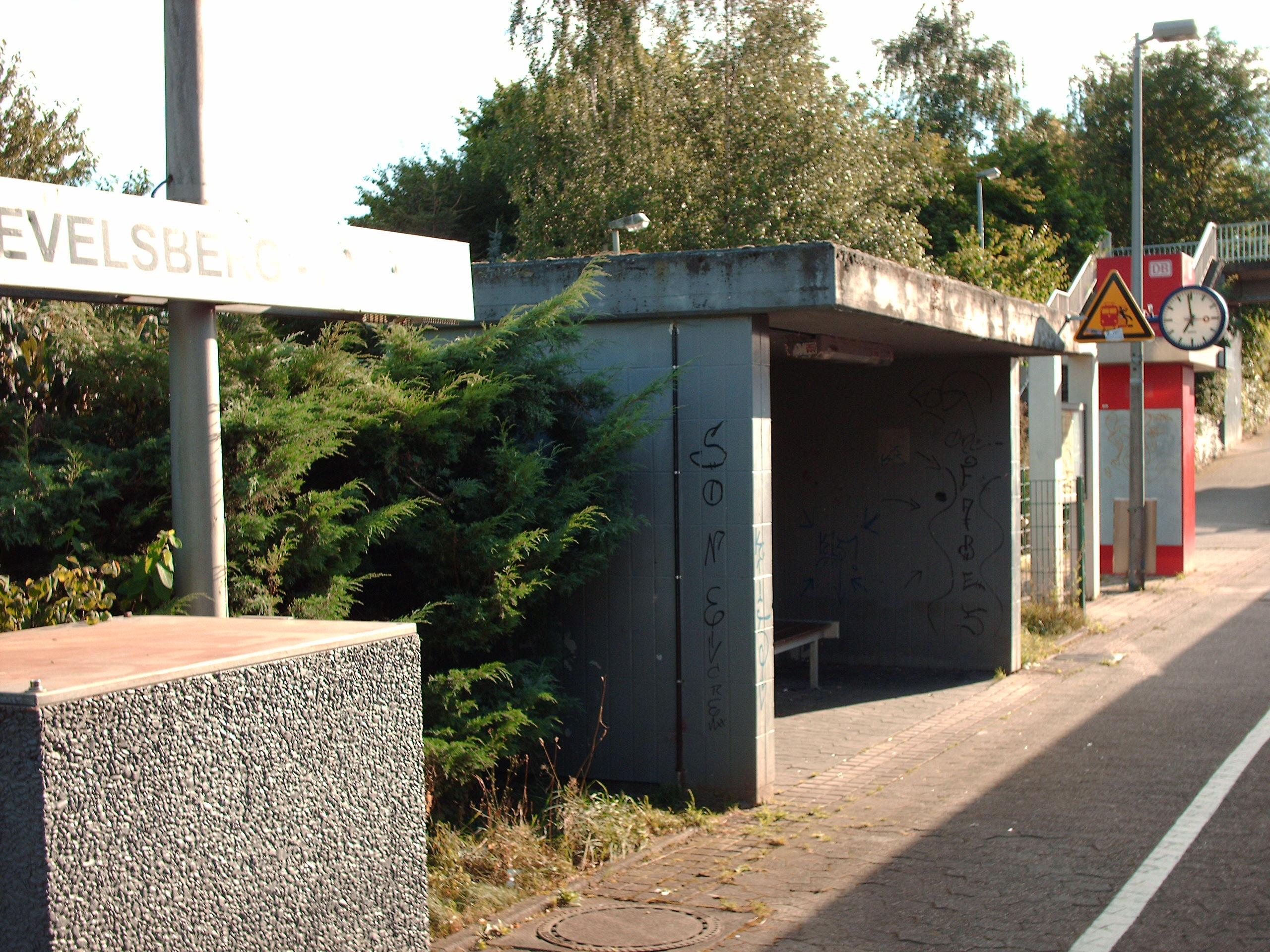

General information
- Location: Burbecker Str. 8 Gevelsberg, NRW; Germany
- Coordinates: 51°20′12″N 7°22′41″E
- Lines: D-Derendorf–Dortmund Süd (KBS 450.8)
- Platforms: 2

Construction
- Accessible: Platform 1 only

Other information
- Station code: 2116
- DS100 code: EGVA
- IBNR: 8001943
- Category: 6
- Fare zone: VRR: 679
- Website: www.bahnhof.de

History
- Opened: 1 June 1980

Services
Preceding station	Rhine-Ruhr S-Bahn	Following station
Gevelsberg Hbf towards Mönchengladbach Hbf	S8	Hagen-Westerbauer towards Hagen Hbf
Gevelsberg Hbf towards Haltern am See or Recklinghausen Hbf	S9	Hagen-Westerbauer towards Hagen Hbf
Location

Gevelsberg-Knapp station is a through station in the town of Gevelsberg in the German state of North Rhine-Westphalia. The station was opened on 1 June 1980 on a section of the Düsseldorf-Derendorf–Dortmund Süd railway, opened by the Rhenish Railway Company (German: Rheinische Eisenbahn-Gesellschaft, RhE) between Wuppertal-Wichlinghausen and Hagen RhE station (now Hagen-Eckesey depot) on 15 September 1879. It has two platform tracks and it is classified by Deutsche Bahn as a category 6 station.

The station is served by Rhine-Ruhr S-Bahn line S8 between Mönchengladbach and Hagen and line S9 between Recklinghausen and Hagen, both every 60 minutes.
