= Hagen-Westerbauer station =

Railway station in Westerbauer, Germany

Hagen Westerbauer
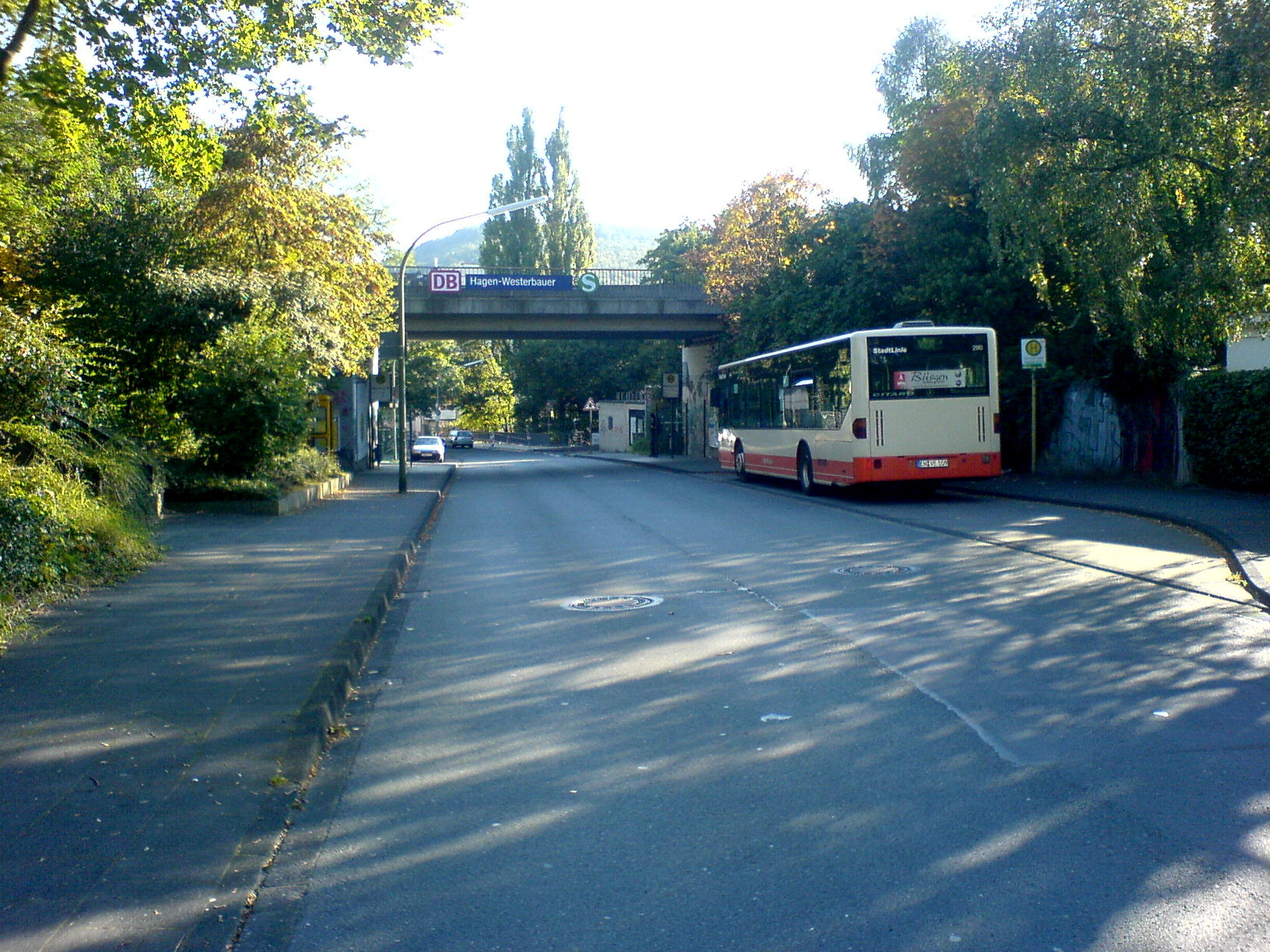

General information
- Location: Nordstraße 13, Hagen, NRW; Germany
- Coordinates: 51°20′30″N 7°23′52″E
- Lines: D-Derendorf–Dortmund Süd (KBS 450.8
- Platforms: 2

Construction
- Accessible: No

Other information
- Station code: 2465
- DS100 code: EHWB
- IBNR: 8004440
- Category: 6
- Fare zone: VRR: 587
- Website: www.bahnhof.de

History
- Opened: 28 May 1983

Services
Preceding station	Rhine-Ruhr S-Bahn	Following station
Gevelsberg-Knapp towards Mönchengladbach Hbf	S8	Hagen-Heubing towards Hagen Hbf
Gevelsberg-Knapp towards Haltern am See or Recklinghausen Hbf	S9	Hagen-Heubing towards Hagen Hbf
Location

Hagen-Westerbauer station is a through station in the city of Hagen in the German state of North Rhine-Westphalia. The station was opened on 28 May 1983 on a section of the Düsseldorf-Derendorf–Dortmund Süd railway, opened by the Rhenish Railway Company (German: Rheinische Eisenbahn-Gesellschaft, RhE) between Wuppertal-Wichlinghausen and Hagen RhE station (now Hagen-Eckesey depot) on 15 September 1879. It has two platform tracks and it is classified by Deutsche Bahn as a category 6 station.

The station is served by Rhine-Ruhr S-Bahn line S8 between Mönchengladbach and Hagen and line S9 between Recklinghausen and Hagen, both every 60 minutes.

The station is also served by 3 bus routes operated by Hagener Straßenbahn: 514 (every 15–30 minutes), 521 (60) and 532 (60), additionally bus routes 553 and 555 (both every 60 minutes) by Verkehrsgesellschaft Ennepe-Ruhr serve the station.
