= Hagen-Wehringhausen station =

Railway station in Hagen, Germany

Hagen Wehringhausen
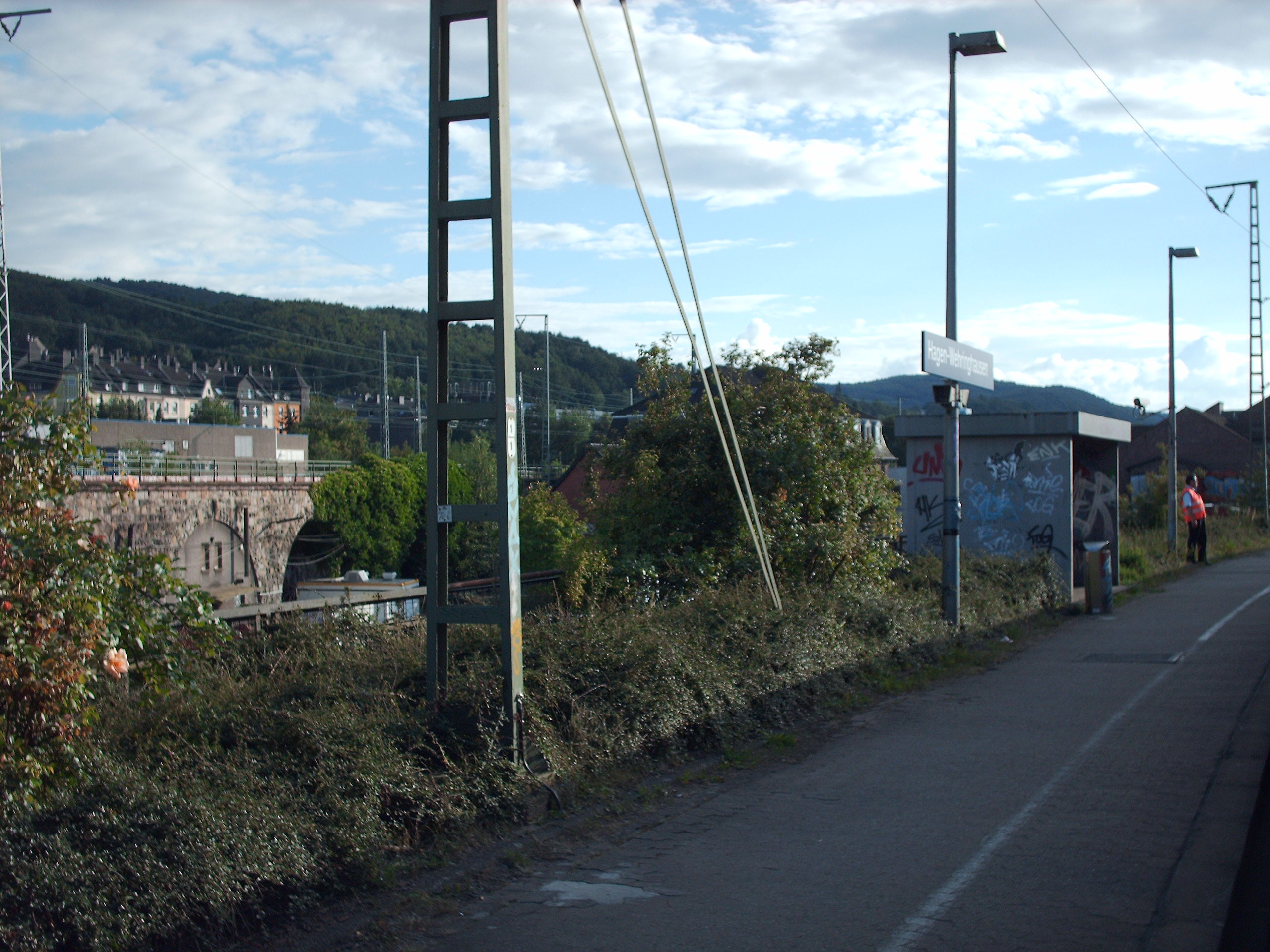

General information
- Location: Schlachthofstr. 2, Hagen, NRW; Germany
- Coordinates: 51°21′12″N 7°26′59″E
- Lines: D-Derendorf–Dortmund Süd (KBS 450.8)
- Platforms: 1

Construction
- Accessible: No

Other information
- Station code: 2464
- DS100 code: EHGW
- IBNR: 8006712
- Category: 6
- Fare zone: VRR: 580
- Website: www.bahnhof.de

History
- Opened: 27 May 1979

Services
Preceding station	Rhine-Ruhr S-Bahn	Following station
Hagen-Heubing towards Mönchengladbach Hbf	S8	Hagen Hbf Terminus
Hagen-Heubing towards Haltern am See or Recklinghausen Hbf	S9	Hagen Hbf Terminus
Location

Hagen-Wehringhausen station is a through station in the city of Hagen in the German state of North Rhine-Westphalia. The station was opened on 27 May 1979 on a section of the Düsseldorf-Derendorf–Dortmund Süd railway, opened by the Rhenish Railway Company (German: Rheinische Eisenbahn-Gesellschaft, RhE) between Wuppertal-Wichlinghausen and Hagen RhE station (now Hagen-Eckesey depot) on 15 September 1879. It has one platform track and it is classified by Deutsche Bahn as a category 6 station. The track bed in the station and the nearby bridge at the eastern end of the station are constructed to carry a second track. The only entrance to the station is a staircase which leads to Minervastraße.

The station is served by Rhine-Ruhr S-Bahn line S8 between Mönchengladbach and Hagen and line S9 between Recklinghausen and Hagen via Gladbeck, Bottrop, Essen, Velbert, and Wuppertal, both every 60 minutes.

The station lies near the Akku-Hawker bus stop, where the 542 Hagener Straßenbahn bus service is calling.
