= Gevelsberg West station =

Railway station in Gevelsberg, Germany

Gevelsberg West
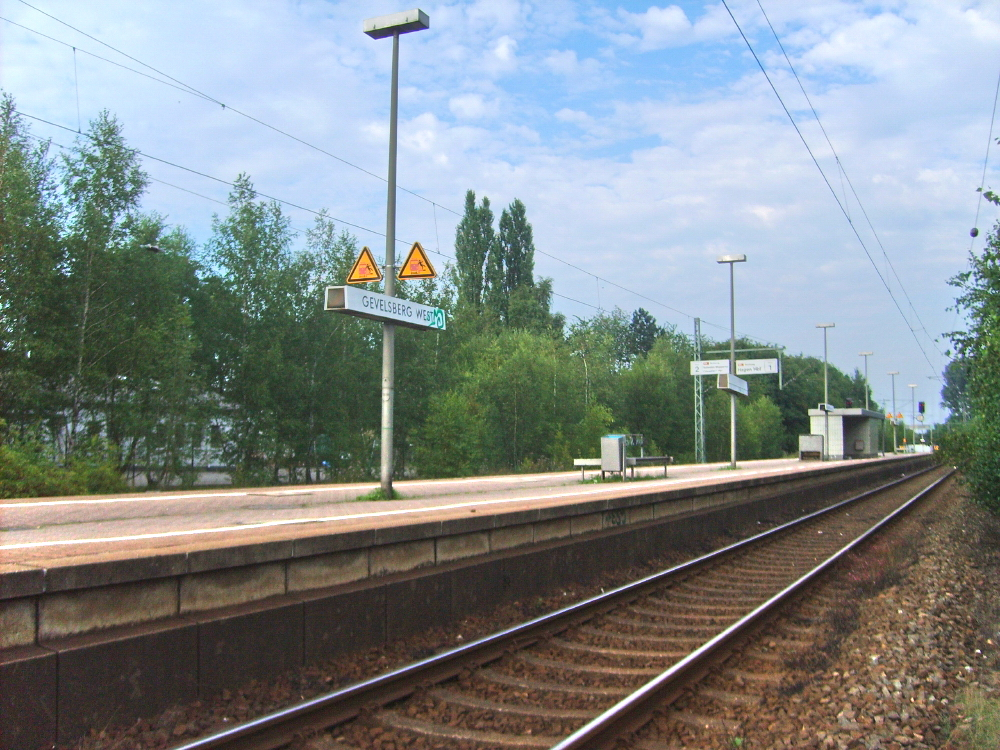

General information
- Location: Am Westbahnhof 1 Gevelsberg, NRW; Germany
- Coordinates: 51°19′00″N 7°18′45″E
- Lines: Witten–Schwelm (KBS 450.8)
- Platforms: 2

Construction
- Accessible: No

Other information
- Station code: 2114
- DS100 code: KGVW
- IBNR: 8002268
- Category: 6
- Fare zone: VRR: 679
- Website: www.bahnhof.de

History
- Opened: 15 May 1934

Services
Preceding station	Rhine-Ruhr S-Bahn	Following station
Schwelm towards Mönchengladbach Hbf	S8	Gevelsberg-Kipp towards Hagen Hbf
Schwelm towards Haltern am See or Recklinghausen Hbf	S9	Gevelsberg-Kipp towards Hagen Hbf
Location

Gevelsberg West station is a through station in the town of Gevelsberg in the German state of North Rhine-Westphalia. The station was opened with the Witten–Schwelm railway from Witten-Höhe to Schwelm that was opened by Deutsche Reichsbahn on 15 May 1934. It has two platform tracks and it is classified by Deutsche Bahn as a category 6 station.

The station is served by Rhine-Ruhr S-Bahn line S 8 between Mönchengladbach and Hagen and line S 9 between Recklinghausen and Hagen, both every 60 minutes.
