= Gevelsberg =

- Town
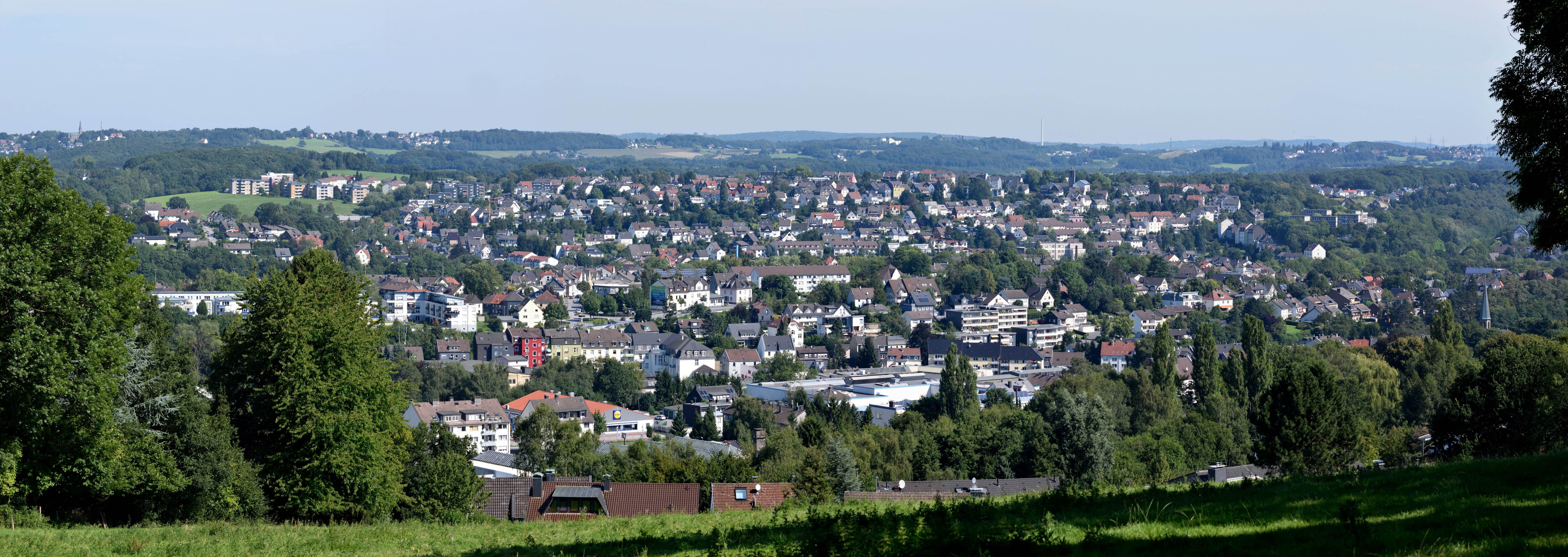
- Gevelsberg in summer

- Flag Coat of arms

- Location of Gevelsberg within Ennepe-Ruhr-Kreis district
- Interactive map of Gevelsberg
- Location within Germany Location within North Rhine-Westphalia
- Coordinates: 51°19′N 7°20′E
- Country: Germany
- State: North Rhine-Westphalia
- Admin. region: Arnsberg
- District: Ennepe-Ruhr-Kreis

Government
  - Mayor (2020–25): Claus Jacobi (SPD)

Area
  - Total: 26.34 km^{2} (10.17 sq mi)
- Elevation: 160 m (520 ft)

Population (2025-12-31)
  - Total: 29,932
  - Density: 1,136/km^{2} (2,943/sq mi)
- Time zone: UTC+01:00 (CET)
  - Summer (DST): UTC+02:00 (CEST)
- Postal codes: 58285
- Dialling codes: 0 23 32
- Vehicle registration: EN
- Website: www.gevelsberg.de

Gevelsberg (German pronunciation: [ˈɡeːfl̩sˌbɛʁk]; Westphalian: Gievelsbiärg) is a town in the district of Ennepe-Ruhr-Kreis, in North Rhine-Westphalia, Germany.

== Geography ==
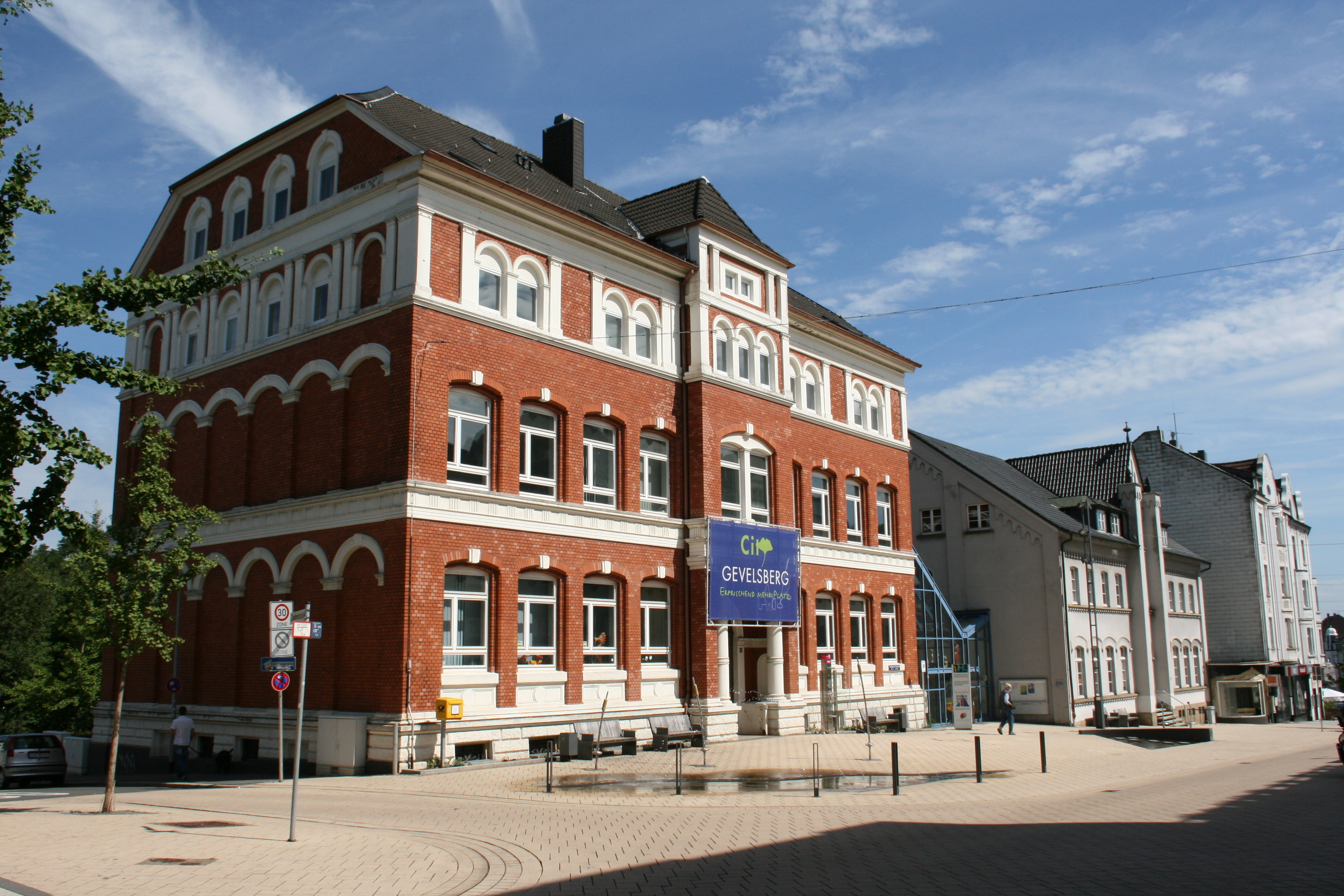
Mittelstraße

The town lies in the valley of the river Ennepe in the Süder Uplands, which is part of the Rhenish Massif. Gevelsberg lies about halfway between Wuppertal and Hagen, and is part of the industrial Ruhr Region. The lowest elevation is the Ennepe river at Vogelsang (132 m or 433 ft) and highest is the Hageböllinger Kopf (336 m or 1,102 ft). Its east-to-west length is 7.1 kilometres (4 3/8 miles) and the north to south length is 7.15 km (4 7/16 mi).

=== Division of the town ===
- Asbeck
- Berge
- Gevelsberg
- Silschede

== History ==
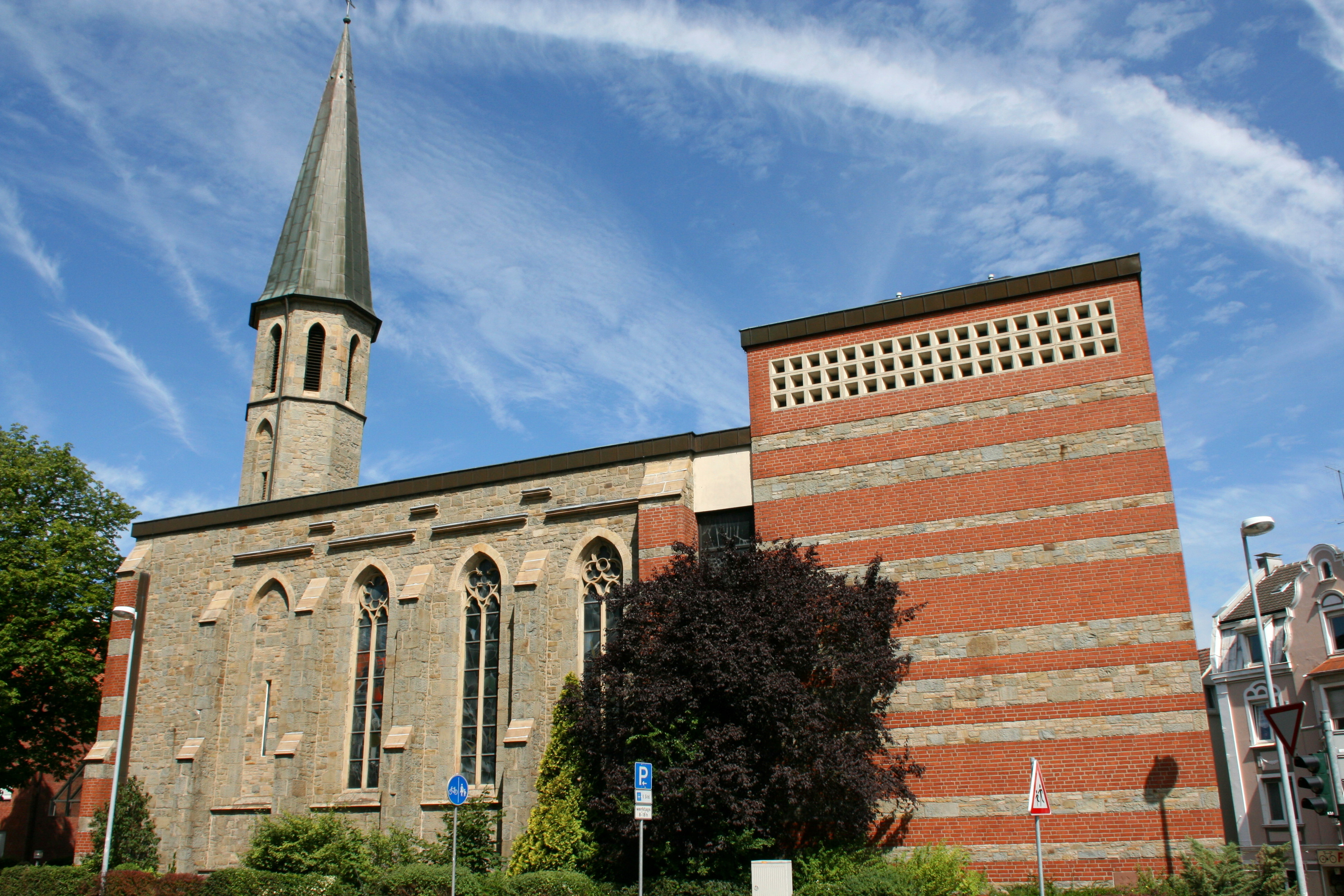
Church of St. Engelbert

The town has a history of nearly 785 years. The archbishop of Cologne Engelbert II of Berg was killed on November 7, 1225 by his cousin Frederick of Isenberg in Gievilberch. As a consequence, a monastery of atonement (German: Sühnekloster) was established at the place of Engelbert's death and became the origin of the settlement resulting in today's Gevelsberg.

The population grew strongly in the 19th century, when many small industries related to iron processing were developed.

=== Coat of arms ===
Gevelsberg received its coat of arms (a brick gable on a green hill, and a cogwheel indicating its industry) by decree of the Prussian Department of the Interior in 1903. In the mid-1950s a city wall was added to the coat of arms.

== Population ==
Historical population

Year	Pop.	±% p.a.
1965	35,492	—
1970	33,667	−1.05%
1975	31,286	−1.46%
1980	31,489	+0.13%
1985	30,462	−0.66%
1990	33,217	+1.75%
1995	33,769	+0.33%

Year	Pop.	±% p.a.
2000	33,621	−0.09%
2005	32,719	−0.54%
2010	31,518	−0.75%
2015	31,315	−0.13%
2020	30,733	−0.37%
2025	29,932	−0.53%

Source: Landesdatabank Nordrhein-Westfalen

== Politics ==
The current mayor of Gevelsberg is Claus Jacobi of the Social Democratic Party (SPD) since 2004. In the most recent mayoral election was held on 14 September 2025, Jacobi was re-elected with 83.3% of votes, defeating Hans-Günther Adrian, who was endorsed by the CDU and The Greens.

=== City council ===
The Gevelsberg city council governs the city alongside the Mayor. The most recent city council election was held on 14 September 2025, and the results were as follows:

Party	Votes	%	+/-	Seats	+/-
Social Democratic Party (SPD)	7,678	53.6	▼9.3	22	▼5
Christian Democratic Union (CDU)	2,351	16.4	▲1.7	7	▲1
Alternative for Germany (AfD)	2,033	14.2	▲9.2	6	▲4
Alliance 90/The Greens (Grüne)	1,059	7.4	▼5.2	3	▼2
The Left (Die Linke)	632	4.4	▲2.0	2	▲1
Free Democratic Party (FDP)	571	4.0	▲1.6	2	▲1
Valid votes	14,324	98.6			
Invalid votes	207	1.4			
Total	14,531	100.0		42	±0
Electorate/voter turnout	25,268	57.5			
Source: City of Gevelsberg

== Transport ==
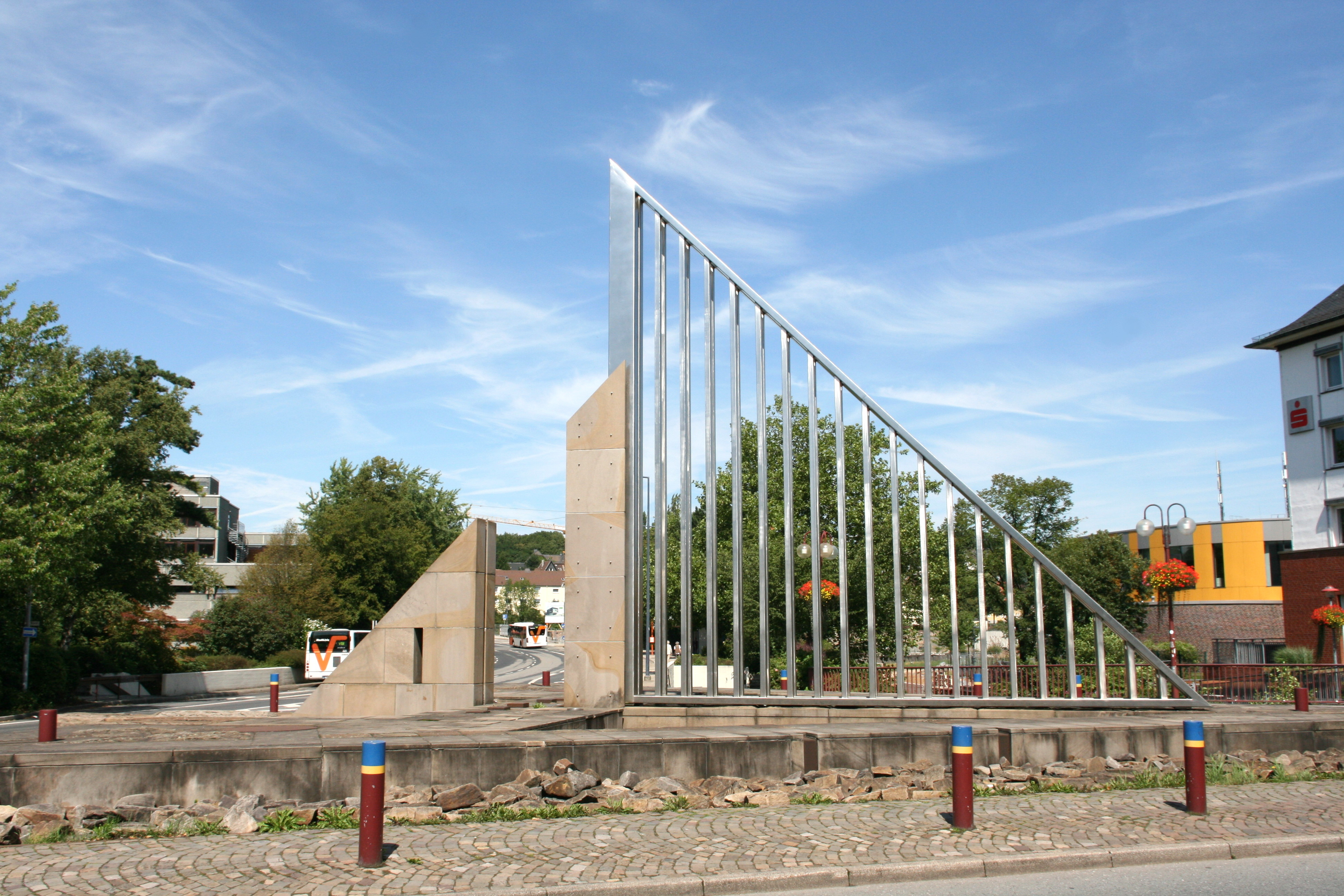
Ennepe Bridge

Gevelsberg is connected to the national road network by the A1 autobahn and the B 7 and B 234 roads.

The municipality is served by several regional train lines of the Verkehrsverbund Rhein-Ruhr. There are four stations on the local line from Hagen to Wuppertal (Gevelsberg-Knapp, Gevelsberg Hauptbahnhof, Gevelsberg-Kipp and Gevelsberg West) served by the S 8 trains of the Rhein-Ruhr S-Bahn. Three hourly Regional-Express services, the Wupper-Express (RE 4) between Dortmund and Aachen via Düsseldorf, the Rhein-Münsterland-Express (RE 7) between Krefeld and Münster via Cologne and Hamm and the Maas-Wupper-Express (RE 13) between Venlo (Netherlands) and Hamm via Mönchengladbach, stop at Ennepetal (Gevelsberg) station.

== Twin towns – sister cities ==
Gevelsberg is twinned with:

- Vendôme, France (1973)
- Szprotawa, Poland (1996)
- Butera, Italy (2004)

== Festivities ==
- Gevelsberg Kirmes – held every last weekend of June
- Quellenfest – every year on Ascension Thursday to Sunday

== Notable people ==
- Elisabeth Höngen (1906–1997), operatic mezzo-soprano
- Michael Cramer (born 1949), politician (The Greens), member of the European Parliament
- Klaus-Peter Thaler (born 1949), cyclist
- Alexandra Popp (born 1991), footballer
- Lukas Klostermann (born 1996), footballer
- Lena Oberdorf (born 2001), footballer
- Kjell Wätjen (born 2006), footballer
