= Schwelm station =

Railway station in Schwelm, Germany

Schwelm
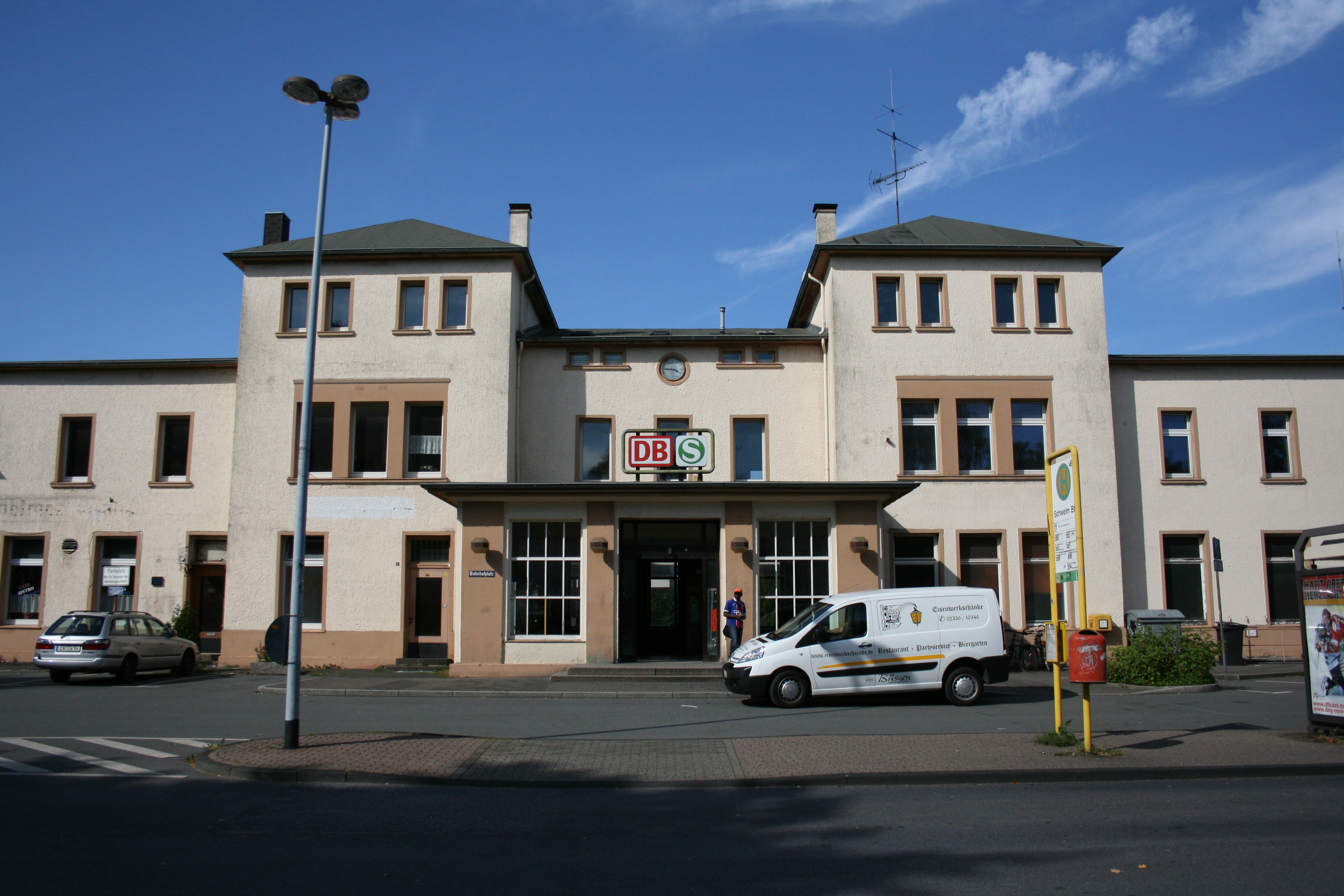

General information
- Location: Bahnhofsplatz 2, Schwelm, NRW; Germany
- Coordinates: 51°17′26.2″N 7°17′21.4″E
- Line: Elberfeld–Dortmund
- Platforms: 4

Construction
- Accessible: Yes

Other information
- Station code: 5749
- DS100 code: KSWE
- IBNR: 8000033
- Category: 3
- Fare zone: VRR: 678; VRS: 1670 (VRR transitional zone)
- Website: www.bahnhof.de

History
- Opened: 1847

Services
Preceding station		Following station
Wuppertal-Oberbarmen towards Venlo	RE 13	Ennepetal towards Hamm (Westf) Hbf
Preceding station	National Express Germany	Following station
Wuppertal-Oberbarmen towards Aachen Hbf	RE 4 (Wupper-Express)	Ennepetal towards Dortmund Hbf
Wuppertal-Oberbarmen towards Krefeld Hbf	RE 7 (Rhein-Münsterland-Express)	Ennepetal towards Rheine
Preceding station	Rhine-Ruhr S-Bahn	Following station
Schwelm West towards Mönchengladbach Hbf	S8	Gevelsberg West towards Hagen Hbf
Schwelm West towards Haltern am See or Recklinghausen Hbf	S9	Gevelsberg West towards Hagen Hbf
Location

Schwelm station is the most important station in the city of Schwelm in the German state of North Rhine-Westphalia. All regional and S-Bahn trains stop at the station. Long-distance services pass through without stopping.

== History ==
The first station building was opened by the Bergisch-Märkische Railway Company on 9 October 1847 along with its Elberfeld–Dortmund line. Since its inauguration, the station has been rebuilt several times, starting in 1865. In 1902, the platforms received a canopy and, on 8 November 1902, an underpass was completed to the second platform. In 1926, Schwelm became a railway junction, when the Witten–Wengern Ost/Schwelm railway was opened by Deutsche Reichsbahn.

In 1988, the station became part of the Rhine-Ruhr S-Bahn, on line S 8 from Hagen via Wuppertal to Mönchengladbach. This uses a flying junction built by the Deutsche Bundesbahn in the 1980s that takes the S-Bahn tracks from Wuppertal to Schwelm under the parallel mainline tracks running towards Hagen directly east of Schwelm station, connecting via a short section of the Witten–Wengern Ost/Schwelm line (the rest of which is closed) to the partially closed Düsseldorf-Derendorf–Dortmund Süd railway towards Gevelsberg-West.

== Platforms ==
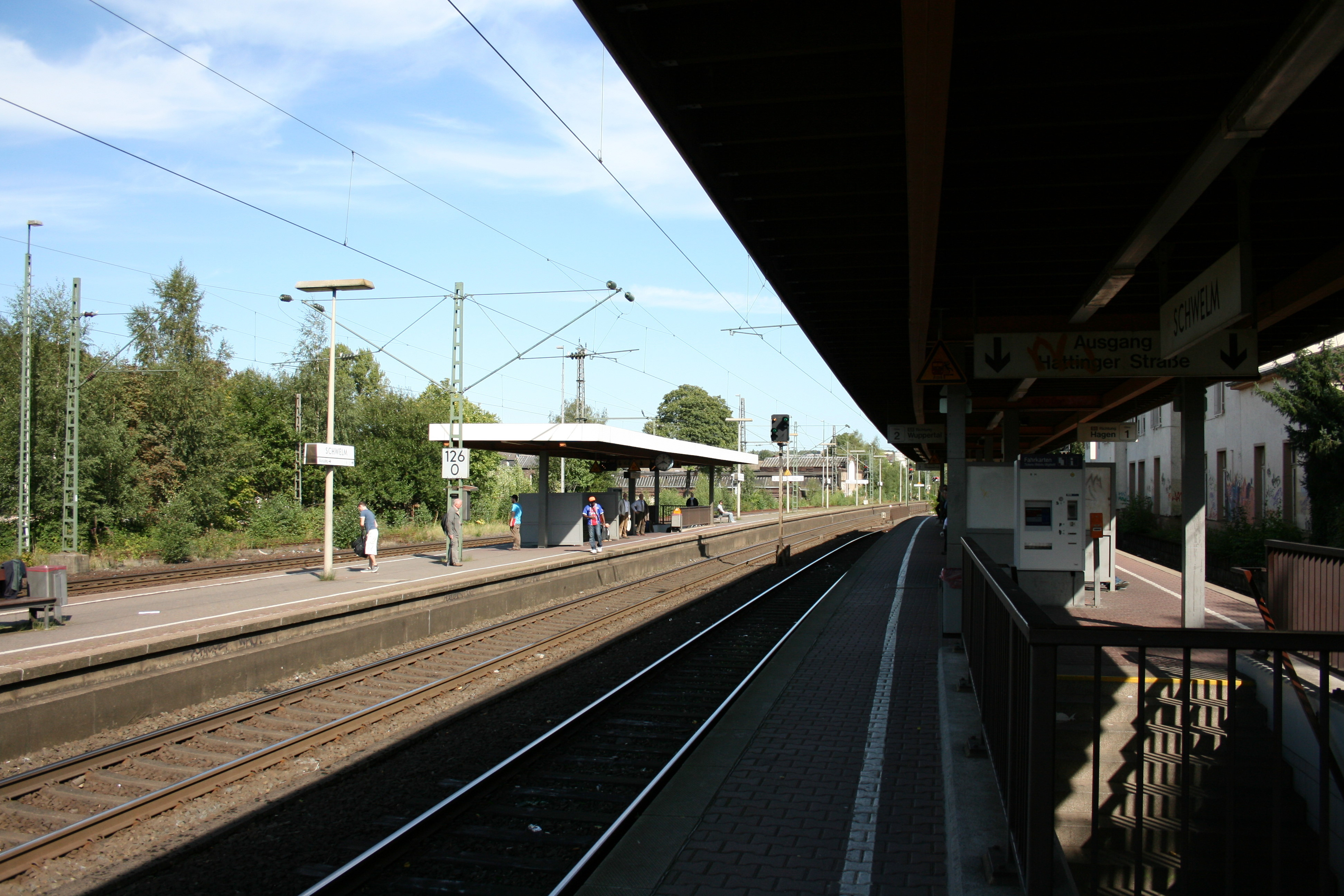
From the platform

The station has four platform tracks, which are accessed from two island platforms. Services on S-Bahn line S 8 stop on tracks 1 and 2. The Regional-Express services on lines RE 4 (Wupper-Express), RE 7 (Rhein-Münsterland-Express) and RE 13 (Maas-Wupper-Express) use tracks 3 and 4, which are also used by the non-stopping long-distance trains. The station is served by Regional-Express services RE 4, RE 7 and RE 13, Rhine-Ruhr S-Bahn line S 8 between Mönchengladbach and Hagen and line S 9 between Recklinghausen and Hagen, all every 60 minutes.

Both platforms have been barrier-free accessible by lift since 2022. Apart from ticket machines, tickets can only be bought in the Verkehrsgesellschaft Ennepe-Ruhr (VER) customer centre on the station square.
