= Hagen-Heubing station =

Railway station in Haspe, Germany

Hagen Heubing
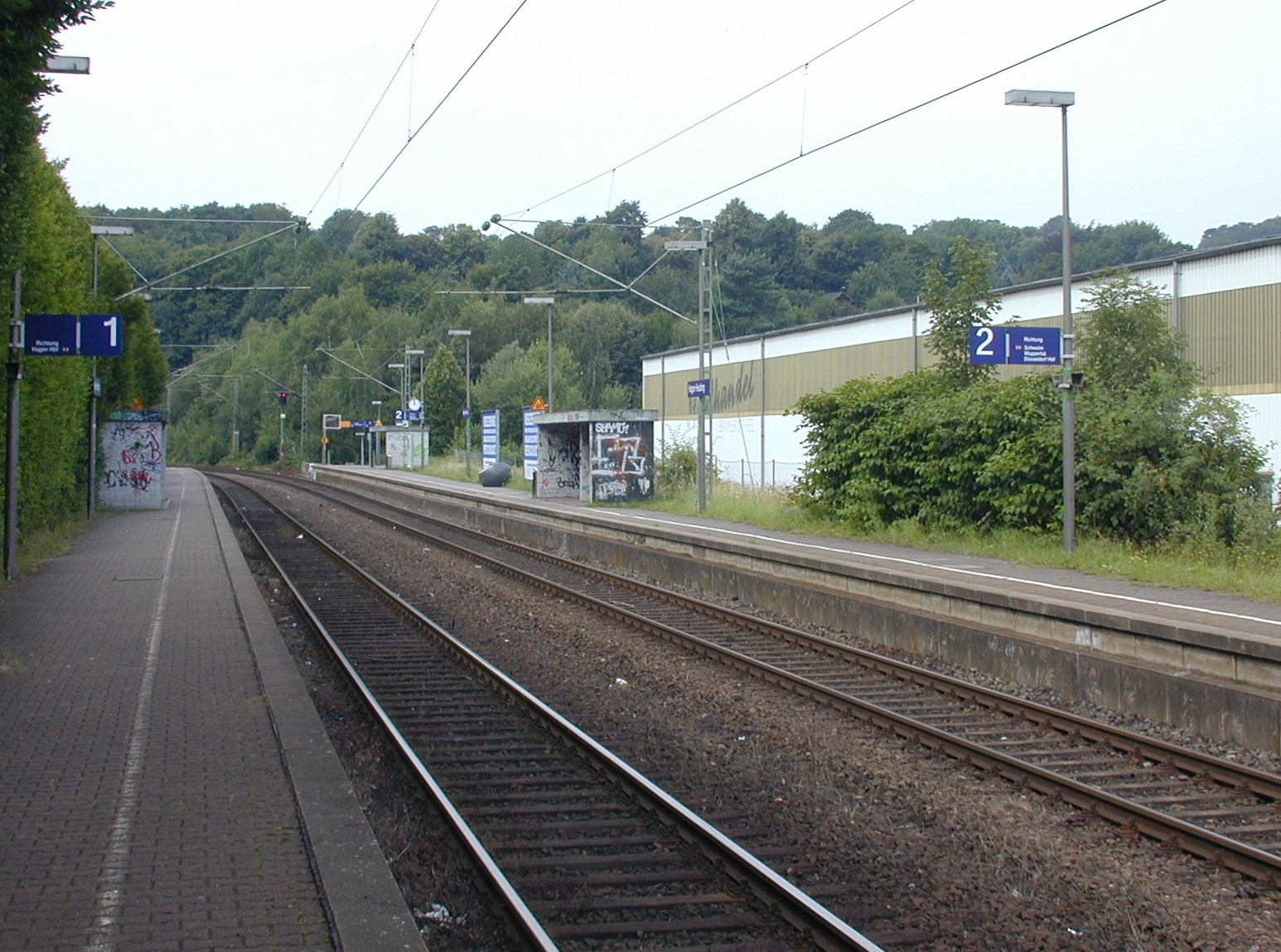

General information
- Location: Am Hasper Bahnhof; Hagen, NRW; Germany
- Coordinates: 51°21′08″N 7°25′28″E
- Lines: D-Derendorf–Dortmund Süd (KBS 450.8
- Platforms: 2

Construction
- Accessible: Yes

Other information
- Station code: 2460
- DS100 code: EHGI
- IBNR: 8002512
- Category: 6
- Fare zone: VRR: 587
- Website: www.bahnhof.de

History
- Opened: 15 September 1879

Services
Preceding station	Rhine-Ruhr S-Bahn	Following station
Hagen-Westerbauer towards Mönchengladbach Hbf	S8	Hagen-Wehringhausen towards Hagen Hbf
Hagen-Westerbauer towards Haltern am See or Recklinghausen Hbf	S9	Hagen-Wehringhausen towards Hagen Hbf
Location

Hagen-Heubing station is a through station in the city of Hagen in the German state of North Rhine-Westphalia. The station was opened along with a section of the Düsseldorf-Derendorf–Dortmund Süd railway, opened by the Rhenish Railway Company (German: Rheinische Eisenbahn-Gesellschaft, RhE) between Wuppertal-Wichlinghausen and Hagen RhE station (now Hagen-Eckesey depot) on 15 September 1879. It was closed on 14 May 1950, but reopened in 1968. It has two platform tracks and it is classified by Deutsche Bahn as a category 6 station.

The station is served by Rhine-Ruhr S-Bahn line S8 between Mönchengladbach and Hagen and line S9 between Recklinghausen and Hagen, both every 60 minutes.

The station is also served by four bus routes operated by Hagener Straßenbahn AG: 510 (every 15–30 minutes), 525 (30), 528 (30) and 532 (60).
