= Ennepetal (Gevelsberg) station =

Railway station in Ennepetal, Germany

Ennepetal (Gevelsberg)
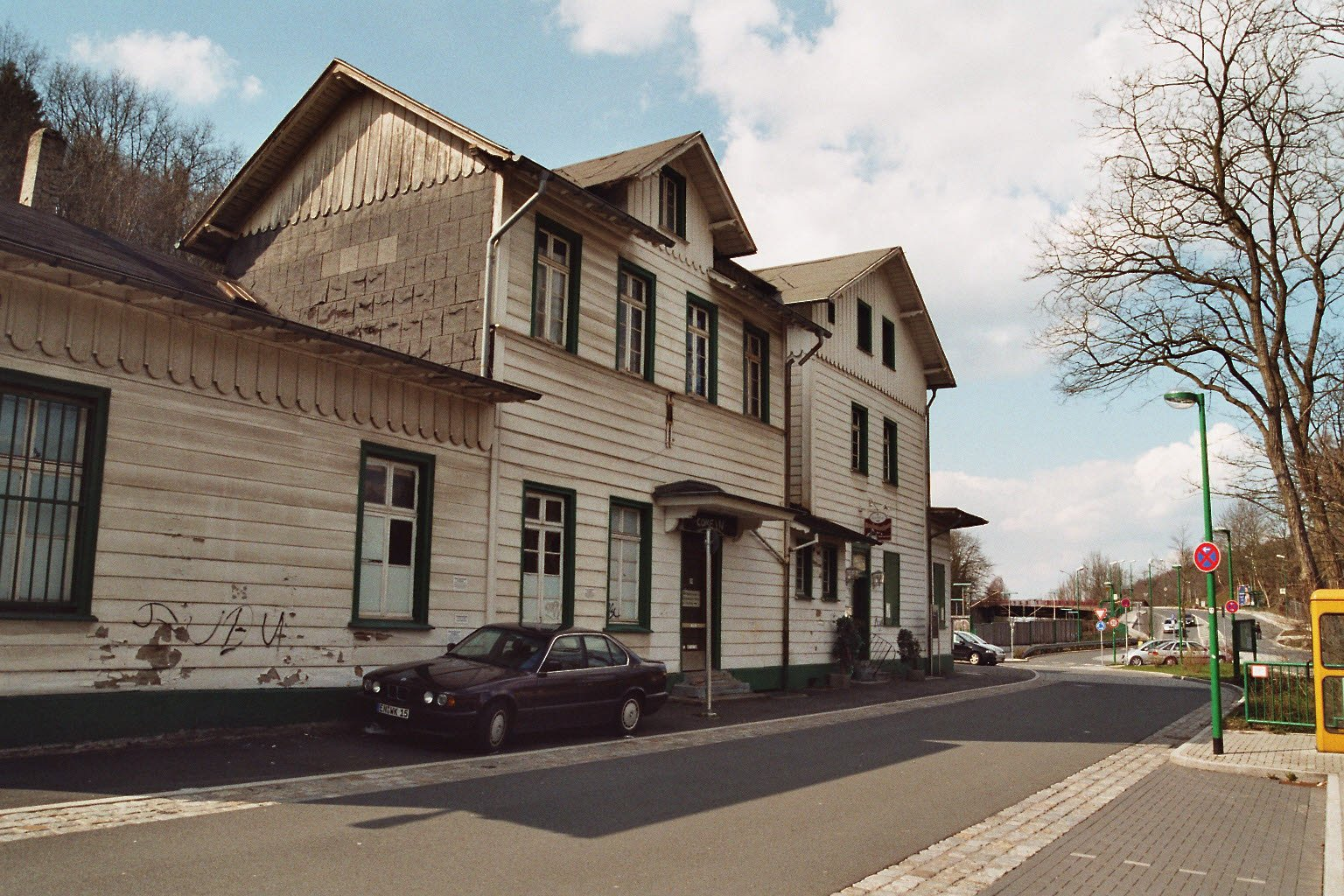

General information
- Location: Bahnhofstraße 19, Ennepetal, NRW; Germany
- Coordinates: 51°18′16″N 7°20′37″E
- Line: Elberfeld–Dortmund
- Platforms: 2

Construction
- Accessible: Yes

Other information
- Station code: 1603
- DS100 code: EENP
- IBNR: 8001795
- Category: 5
- Fare zone: VRR: 670; VRS: 1670 (VRR transitional zone)
- Website: www.bahnhof.de

History
- Opened: 9 March 1849

Services
Preceding station		Following station
Schwelm towards Venlo	RE 13	Hagen Hbf towards Hamm (Westf) Hbf
Preceding station	National Express Germany	Following station
Schwelm towards Aachen Hbf	RE 4 (Wupper-Express)	Hagen Hbf towards Dortmund Hbf
Schwelm towards Krefeld Hbf	RE 7 (Rhein-Münsterland-Express)	Hagen Hbf towards Rheine
Location

Ennepetal (Gevelsberg) station is a 160-year-old station on the Elberfeld–Dortmund railway built by the Bergisch-Märkische Railway Company. It is in the city of Ennepetal in the German state of North Rhine-Westphalia. The former station building is one of the oldest of its kind in North Rhine-Westphalia and has been listed as a monument since 1986. The station is on the Industrial Heritage Trail.

== History ==
With the construction of the Elberfeld–Dortmund line by the Bergisch-Märkische Railway Company in 1848, a station was opened in Milspe, now a suburb of Ennepetal, on 9 March 1849. The station was a timber-framed building. It was called Milspe station until 1954, when it was renamed Ennepetal-Milspe, reflecting the merger of the towns of Milspe and Voerde as Ennepetal 1949. With the closure of Gevelsberg station on the line in 1963, the neighbouring town Gevelsberg no longer had its own station on the Elberfeld–Dortmund line. Thus in 1968 Ennepetal-Milspe station was renamed again as Ennepetal (Gevelsberg) station, although it lies entirely within the city of Ennepetal.

== Services ==
The station is now served only by Regional-Express services, RE 4 (Wupper-Express), RE 7 (Rhein-Münsterland-Express) and RE 13 (Maas-Wupper-Express). The platform for trains towards Hagen could only be reached at ground level for decades, while the platform for trains towards Wuppertal could only be reached by a subway. In 2010, the existing platform tunnel was rebuilt and extended under the street. Today, there are stairs to the platform and since mid-2011 a lift as well. The central platform has been rebuilt with two new platform edges with a height of 76 cm. The wooden platform canopy was preserved and repainted.
