= Elberfeld–Dortmund railway =

Railway line

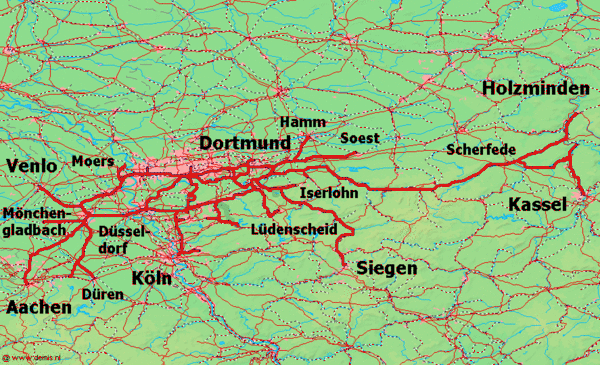
- Network of the Bergisch-Märkische Railway

Overview
- Line number: 2550 (Wuppertal–Hagen); 2801 (Hagen–Dortmund); 2525 (Wuppertal–Schwelm, S-Bahn); 2701 (W-Oberbarmen–Schwelm, freight)
- Locale: North Rhine-Westphalia, Germany

Service
- Route number: 427, 455 (long distance); 450.5, 450.8 (S-Bahn)

Technical
- Line length: 56 km (35 mi)
- Track gauge: 1,435 mm (4 ft 8 1/2 in) standard gauge
- Electrification: 15 kV/16.7 Hz AC overhead catenary
- Operating speed: 160 km/h (99.4 mph) (max)

The Elberfeld–Dortmund railway is a major railway in the German state of North Rhine-Westphalia. It is part of a major axis for long distance and regional rail services between Wuppertal and Cologne, and is served by Intercity Express, InterCity, Regional Express, Regionalbahn and S-Bahn trains.

This 56 km long line was the main line of the Bergisch-Märkische Railway Company. It was opened in 1849 and has been redeveloped several times since and is now fully electrified.

== History ==
Since the Cologne-Minden Railway Company had decided to build its route via Duisburg rather than through the valley of the Wupper river, the Bergisch-Märkische Railway Company (German: Bergisch-Märkische Eisenbahn-Gesellschaft, BME) determined to build its own line through the Wupper valley, to create a link between the highly industrialised area of the Bergisches Land with the east, particularly to connect with the Märkische coal fields, near Dortmund. On 12 July 1844, it acquired a concession from the Prussian government for a rail link in the highly industrialised area of the Wupper valley and the Bergisch land. The line was opened from Döppersberg in Wuppertal to Schwelm on 9 October 1847. It was extended to Hagen and Dortmund on 20 December 1848.

On 9 March 1849, Düsseldorf-Elberfeld Railway Company's and the BME completed a line connecting the Elberfeld–Dortmund line with the Düsseldorf–Elberfeld line, which connected Wuppertal-Steinbeck to the Rhine at Düsseldorf and was completed in 1841. This line ran through the new Elberfeld station (now called Wuppertal Hauptbahnhof) and the nearby Döppersberg station was closed.

== Development of the main line ==
After the BME was nationalised, its main line between Düsseldorf and Dortmund were gradually upgraded. Between 1900 and 1915 additional tracks were built for local traffic with the existing tracks being reserved for through trains. The first section of track was opened in 1911 between Unterbarmen and Oberbarmen, followed by the section between Elberfeld and Vohwinkel opened on 10 April 1913. Two years later, the gap was closed between Elberfeld and Unterbarmen.

=== Development for the S-Bahn ===
Following the establishment of the S-Bahn line S8 (Mönchengladbach–Hagen), the slow lines between Wuppertal-Vohwinkel and Wuppertal-Oberbarmen were incorporated into the S-Bahn line. On 29 May 1988 new sections of track were opened between Wuppertal-Oberbarmen and Linderhausen junction to the Schwelm–Witten line in the east and between Wuppertal-Vohwinkel and Dusseldorf Hbf in the west.

== Current situation ==
The line runs partly parallel with the tracks of the Wuppertal Northern Railway built by the Rhenish Railway Company, which ran through the countryside of the northern Wupper valley and is now largely abandoned.

The S-Bahn line S8 and S9 from Hagen to Wuppertal (S8 continue to Düsseldorf and Mönchengladbach) uses sections of both routes, which are connected by a short section of the largely abandoned Witten-Schwelm line. The S-Bahn line S5 connecting Dortmund, Witten and Hagen (where it connects with S8 and S9) runs entirely on the historic BME route.

== Services ==
The line is also used every hour by Intercity Express line 10, connecting Cologne and Berlin via Hamm, Hanover, stopping at Wuppertal and Hagen. Additional InterCity trains also operate between Cologne and Hamm on IC lines 31 and 55 every 2 hours.

The section of the line between Hagen and Wuppertal is served hourly by Regional-Express line RE 4 (Wupper-Express) between Dortmund and Aachen via Dusseldorf, stopping at major stations. The line is also served hourly by line RE 7 (Rhein-Münsterland-Express) between Krefeld and Münster via Cologne and Hamm and by line RE 13 (Maas-Wupper-Express) between Venlo (Netherlands) and Hamm via Mönchengladbach. Various Regionalbahn services also operate on the line.
