= Düsseldorf-Derendorf–Dortmund Süd railway =

German railway line

Overview
- Line number: 2423 (Düsseldorf–Dortmund); 2722 (W-Vohwinkel–W-Varresbeck); 2710 (W-Oberbarmen–W-Wichlinghausen); 2712 (Schwelm–W-Langerfeld (old))
- Locale: North Rhine-Westphalia, Germany

Service
- Route number: 434 (Regionalbahn); 450.5, 450.8, 450.28 (S-Bahn)

Technical
- Line length: 78 km (48 mi)
- Number of tracks: 2: Hagen-Eckesey–Gevelsberg West; 2: Mettmann Stadtwald–Düsseldorf Gerresheim
- Track gauge: 1,435 mm (4 ft 8 1/2 in) standard gauge

The Düsseldorf-Derendorf–Dortmund Süd railway is a partially closed line in the German state of North Rhine-Westphalia from Düsseldorf-Derendorf station (formerly Düsseldorf RhE station) to Dortmund South station (formerly Dortmund RhE station). Parts of it are still busy, including two sections used for the Rhine-Ruhr S-Bahn.

Regionally, it is also called the Wuppertaler Nordbahn (Wuppertal Northern Railway), Düsseltalbahn (Düssel Valley railway) or simply the Rheinische Strecke (Rhenish line).

== History ==
The route was built by the Rhenish Railway Company (German: Rheinische Eisenbahn-Gesellschaft, RhE) between 1873 and 1879 as a rival to the Elberfeld–Dortmund trunk line built by the Bergisch-Märkische Railway Company (Bergisch-Märkische Eisenbahn-Gesellschaft, BME). In order to compete in the few untapped areas of the Wupper valley (Wuppertal), the new line went via Mettmann, the northern Wupper valley, Schwelm, Gevelsberg, western Hagen and Herdecke.

=== Dortmund ===
The RhE had already opened the last part of its Ruhr line on 19 November 1874. This route meant that the Dortmund RhE station could not be built near the joint Dortmund station of the BME and CME station, which had originally been opened by the Cologne-Minden Railway Company (Cöln-Mindener Eisenbahn-Gesellschaft, CME) in 1847 and is now called Dortmund Hauptbahnhof. Therefore, it built its station next to the Dortmund KWE station, which was built at the same time by the Royal Westphalian Railway Company (Königlich-Westfälische Eisenbahn, KWE), southeast of central Dortmund on a then undeveloped area between the streets of Märkischen Straße and Voßkuhle. This joint station later became Dortmund South Station (Bahnhof Dortmund Süd).

The RhE built a new line from its station in Dortmund to the south in order to serve the local mines. On 12 November 1875, the first freight train ran to Hörde RhE station (later Hörde-Hacheney). On 28 December 1878, the line was extended to Löttringhausen, which was connected two years to the Dortmund-Löttringhausen–Bochum-Langendreer railway (known as the Rheinischer Esel, Rhenish Ass).

=== Düsseldorf ===
Also on 19 November 1874, the RhE opened the Troisdorf–Mülheim-Speldorf railway, connecting its Ruhr line with its East Rhine Railway. As with many of its other lines, the RhE chose a very direct route, which bypassed central Düsseldorf.

=== Wuppertal ===
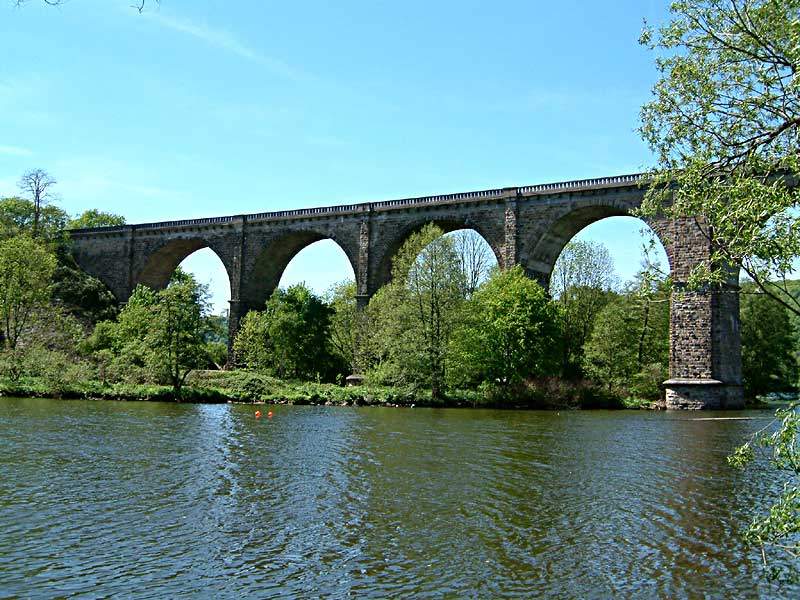
Ruhr Viaduct in Herdecke

The route was very difficult between Vohwinkel and Hagen, particularly in the densely populated Wuppertal area, because the easiest route through the centre of the valleys of the Wupper and Ennepe was already occupied by the trunk section of the BME. Therefore, the railway was built on a slope, requiring complex engineering structures such as viaducts and tunnels, which still influence much the city in the northern districts of Wuppertal. The most famous structure is the imposing Ruhr Viaduct in Herdecke.

Several other lines branched off this railway: in Wuppertal-Barmen the line to Hatzfeld and the line to Hattingen branched off, in Gevelsberg the Elbsche Valley Railway branched off to Witten and in Dortmund-Löttringhausen the former line to Langendreer branched off to Witten Ost. In Neu-Dornap/Vohwinkel, the line crossed the Wuppertal-Vohwinkel–Essen-Überruhr railway (the so-called Prince William Railway), in Hagen-Haspe the line connected with the Ennepe Valley Railway and in Hagen-Vorhalle it crossed the BME trunk line.

Economically, it could not compete in the following years with the more centrally located main line of the BME despite good gradients–the steep Erkrath-Hochdahl incline on the competing BME line could not initially be climbed by the locomotives under their own power and trains had to be hauled by a cable system. After the nationalisation of the line in 1880 the Wuppertal Northern Railway therefore was used only for a modest regional passenger services and as relief line to the main route and as a detour when required.

For this purpose various connection lines were built between the Wuppertal Northern Railway and the adjacent lines:

- On 1 June 1890, the Royal Railway Division at Elberfeld opened the line between Oberbarmen and Wichlinghausen (line (VzG) number 2710), connecting with the Wuppertal-Wichlinghausen–Hattingen railway opened six years earlier.
- On 1 November 1894, a direct connection from Haspe RhE (now Hagen-Heubing) to Hagen Hauptbahnhof (line 2804) was opened.
- On 1 April 1896, a connection was opened from Varresbeck and Lüntenbeck to Vohwinkel (line 2722) initially for freight; a month later the first passenger train ran on it
- On 2 January 1912, passenger traffic was discontinued between Herdecke and Hagen-Eckesey (formerly Hagen RhE) and a new connection (line 2821) was opened between Herdecke and Hagen-Vorhalle Yo junction (on the BME trunk line) to Hagen Hbf.
- In 1913, a branch line (line 2712) was opened from Schwelm-Loh (formerly Schwelm RhE) to the old Wuppertal-Langerfeld freight yard.
- On 2 June 1957, the route to Dortmund South station was finally closed and instead a connecting curve was opened with the Dortmund–Soest railway to provide direct access to Dortmund Hauptbahnhof.

On 27 September 1991, most passenger traffic on the Wuppertal Northern Railway—which had most recently operated with class 515 battery-powered railbuses—was closed. After that there were only a few special trips. On 17 December 1999, the last freight train ran on the line.

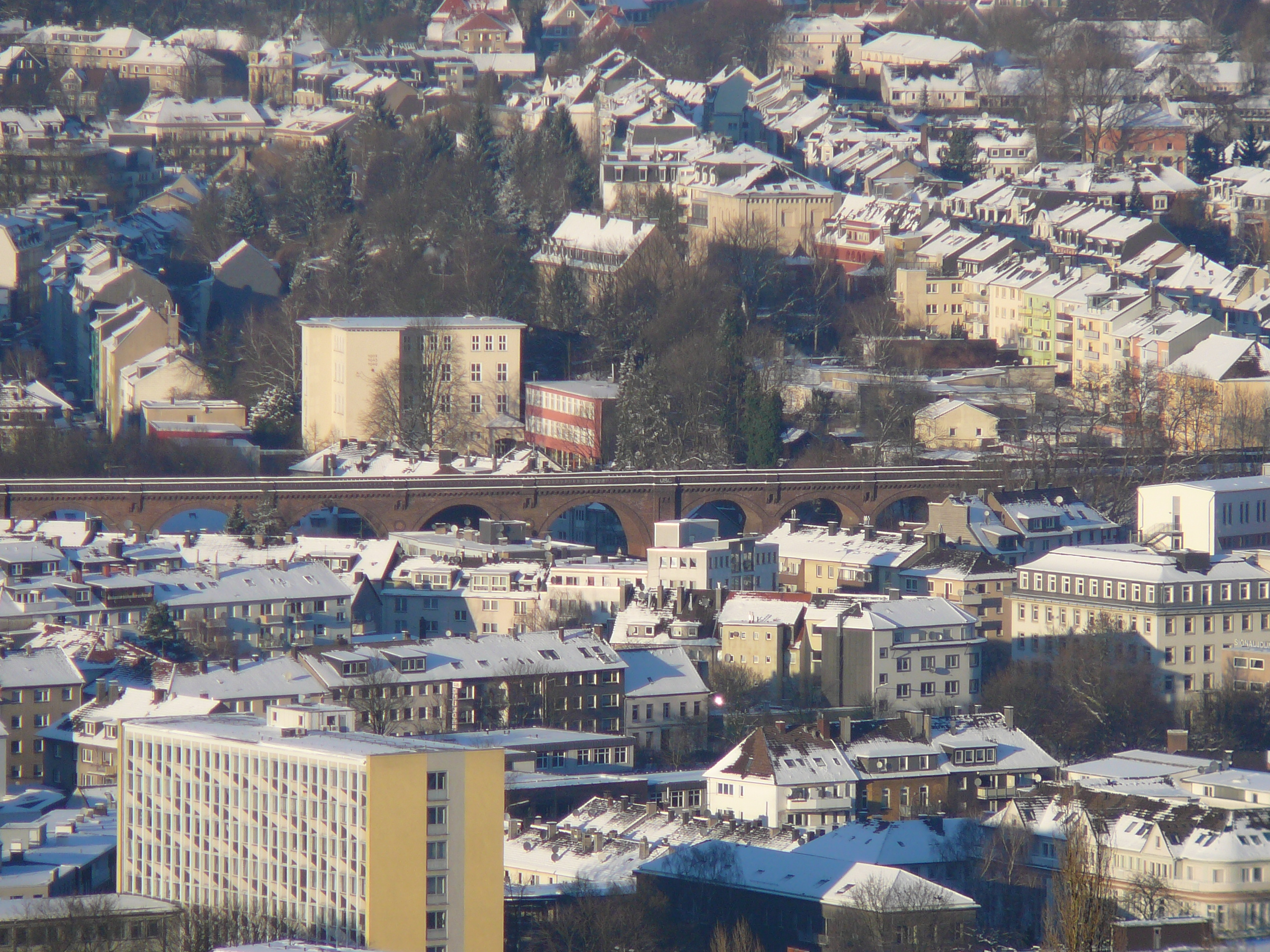
In Wuppertal-Barmen the line crosses the urban area on the Steinweg Viaduct

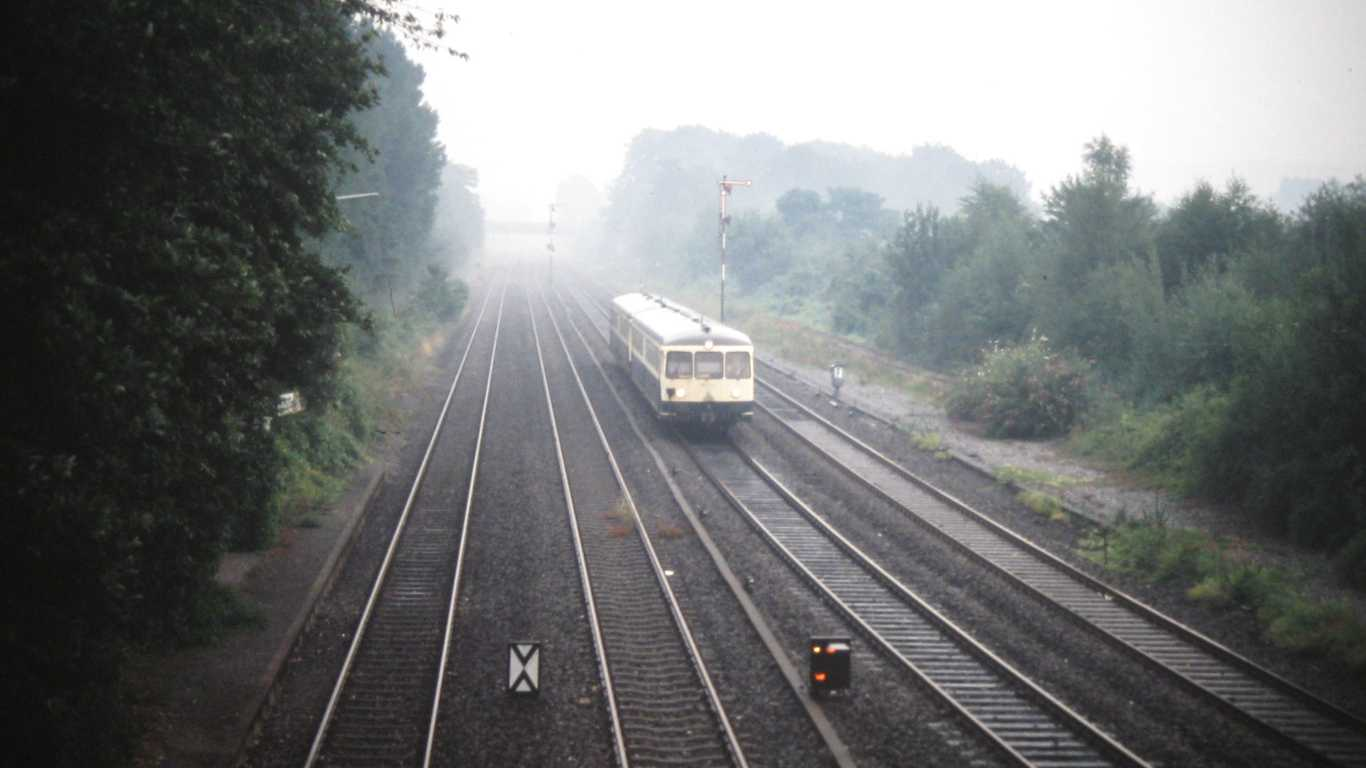
Class 515 battery-powered railbuses at Wuppertal-Lüntenbeck running towards Vohwinkel in 1989

== Current use ==
Passenger services are now operated by Regiobahn GmbH as line S 28 of the Rhine-Ruhr S-Bahn on the section of the line from Düsseldorf through Mettmann, continuing to Wuppertal-Vohwinkel, via the Wuppertal-Vohwinkel–Essen-Überruhr railway. This section is now also used for freight trains running to Dornaper-Hahnenfurth and the nearby limestone quarry.

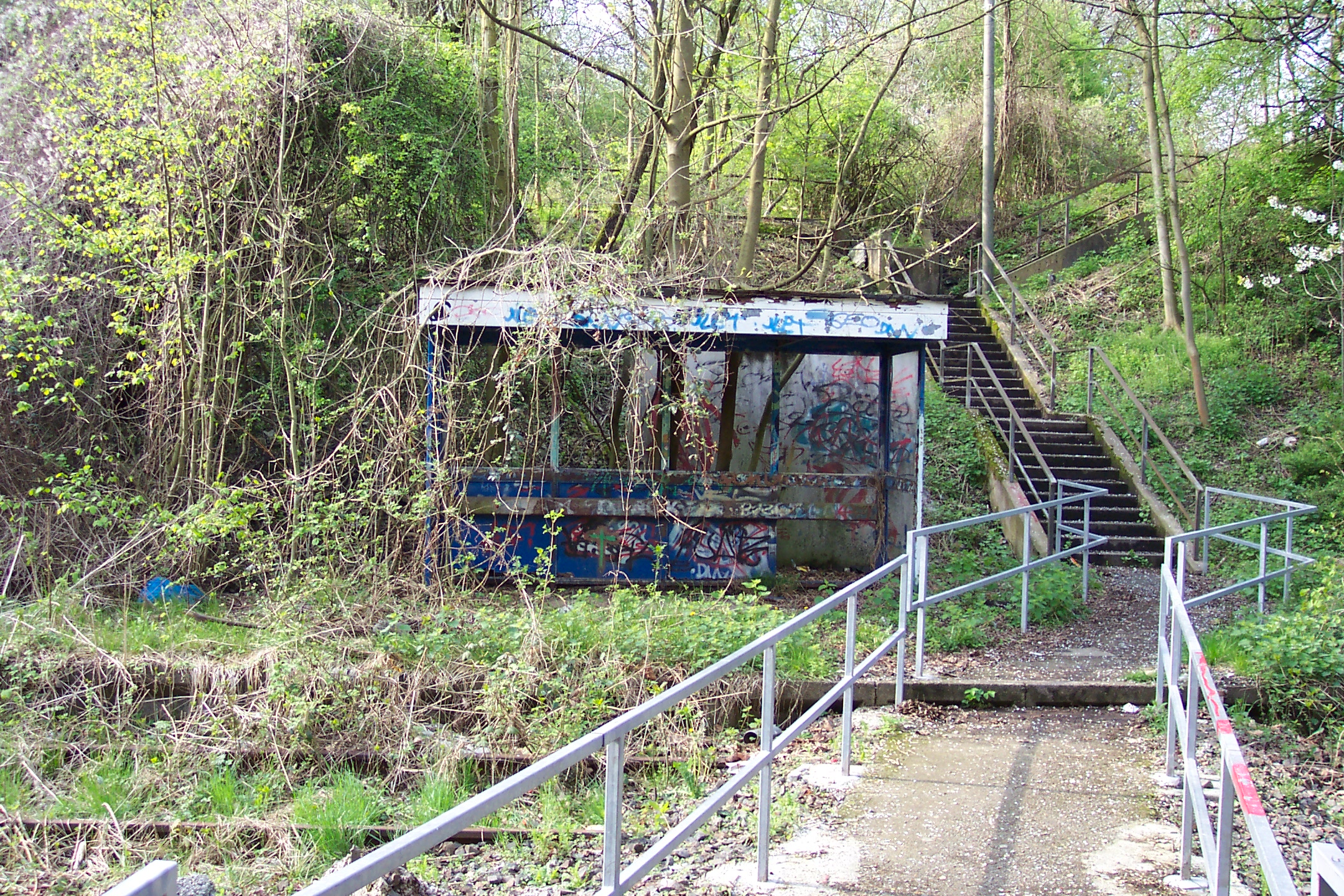
The overgrown station at Dorp

The tracks have been removed from Hahnenfurth to Wuppertal-Lüntenbeck, but a track still exists from Lüntenbeck to Wuppertal-Mirk and Wuppertal-Heubruch. The line between Wuppertal-Vohwinkel and Lüntenbeck and Wuppertal-Wichlinghausen (the connecting line opened in 1896) has been closed since December 1999.

The Wuppertal Bewegung e. V. association maintains the line’s structure and the conversion of the Wuppertal Northern Railway into a cycle path. Early work began with reconstruction between Rott and Osterbaum in April 2009. In the area of Loh station curbs were installed and the first 2 km of the route was levelled on 9 May 2010. The cycle path was opened on 5 June 2010 by the North Rhine-Westphalian Economics Minister, Christa Thoben, the North Rhine-Westphalian Minister of Works and Transport, Lutz Lienenkämper and the Mayor of Wuppertal, Peter Jung.

Northeast of Wuppertal Wichlinghausen the line to closed and dismantled through Schwelm. During the widening of the A 1 autobahn to six lanes, the rail overbridge on the outskirts of Wuppertal and Schwelm was demolished and therefore the route of the line was broken.

From Wuppertal to Hagen to the route is used by line S 8 and S 9 of the Rhine-Ruhr S-Bahn. The section from Hagen Hauptbahnhof to Dortmund Signal-Iduna-Park is used by the Volmetal-Bahn (RB 52) Regionalbahn trains running to and from Lüdenscheid on the Volme Valley Railway.

== Gallery ==
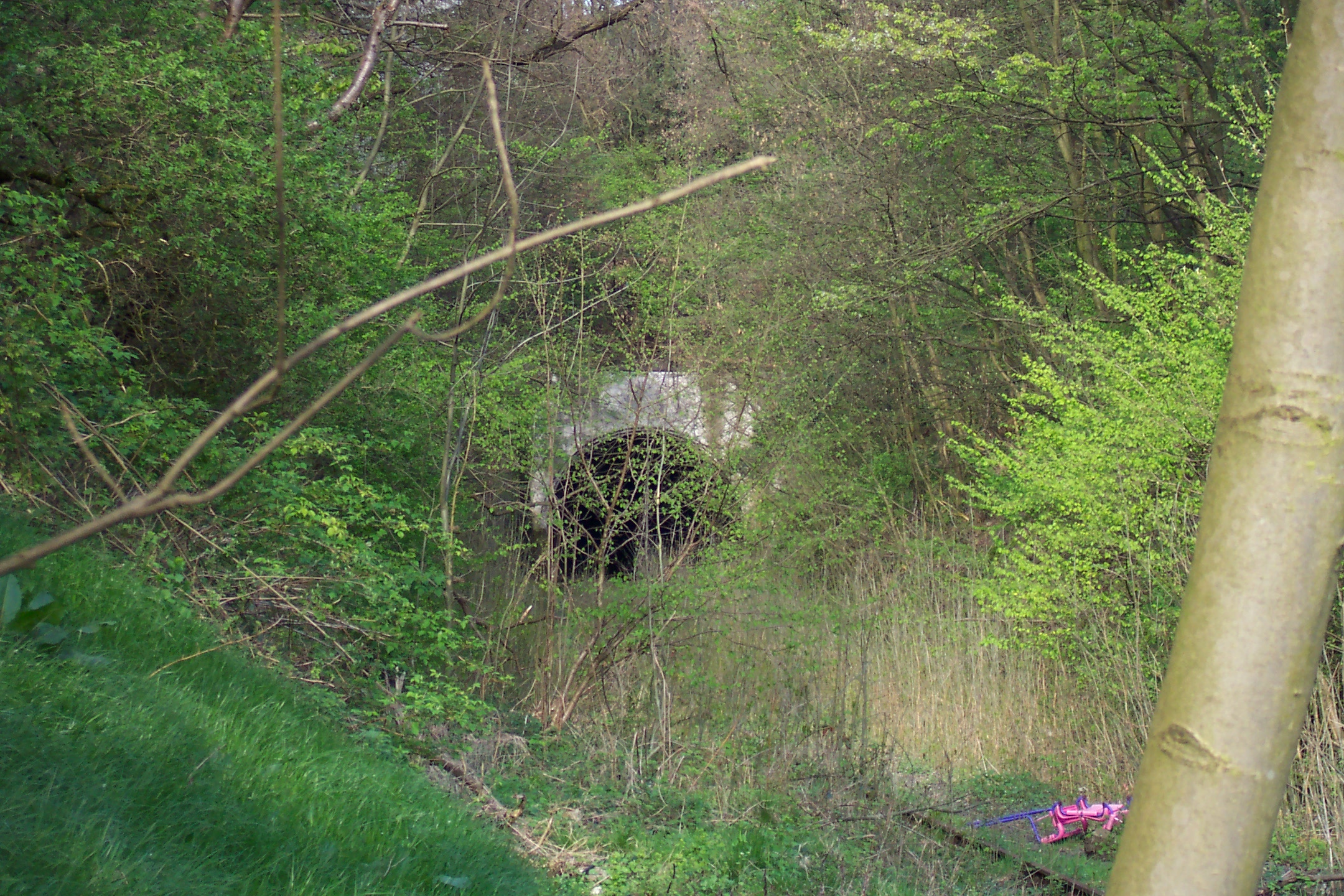
Western entrance to the abandoned Dorp tunnel

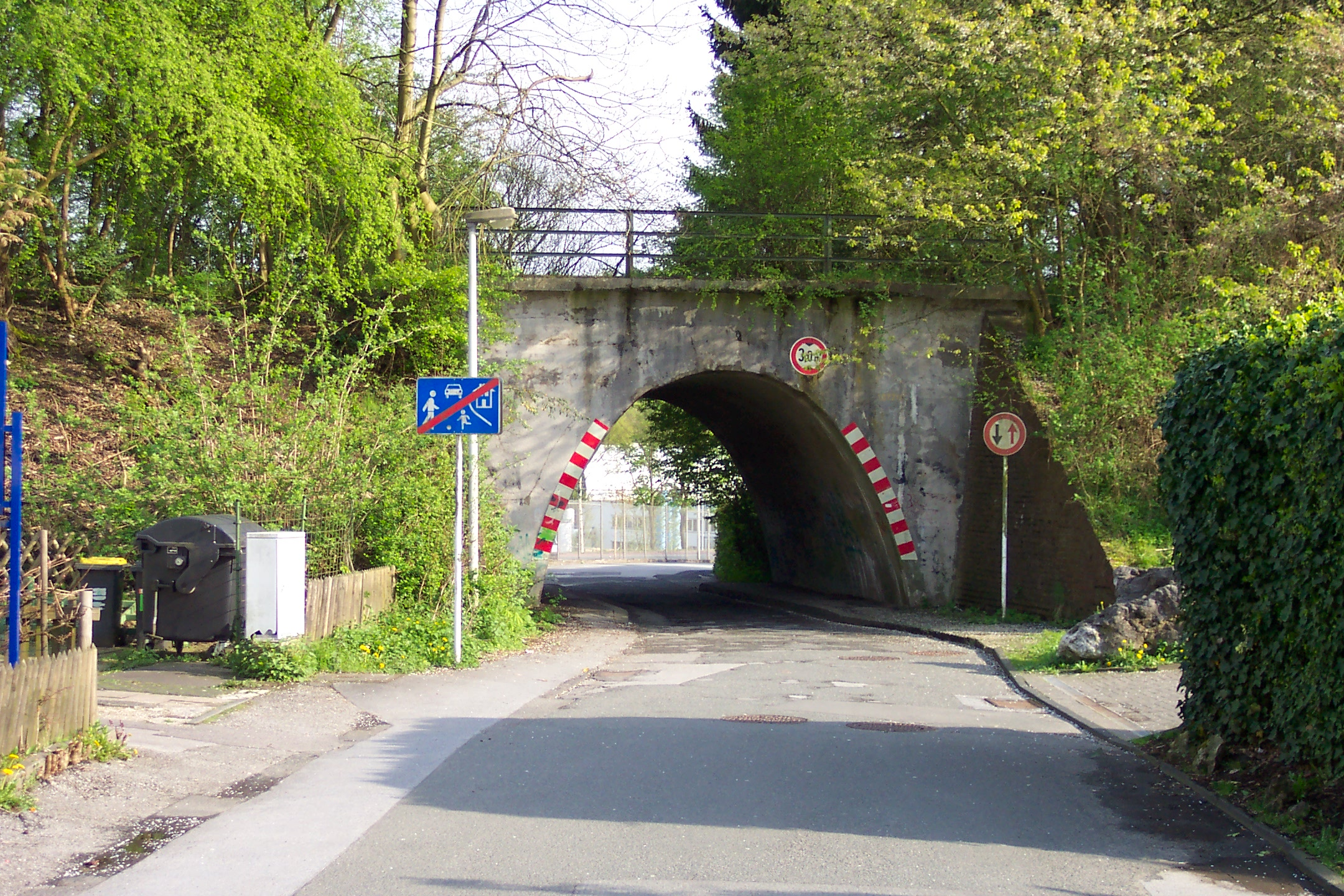
Eskesberg bridge

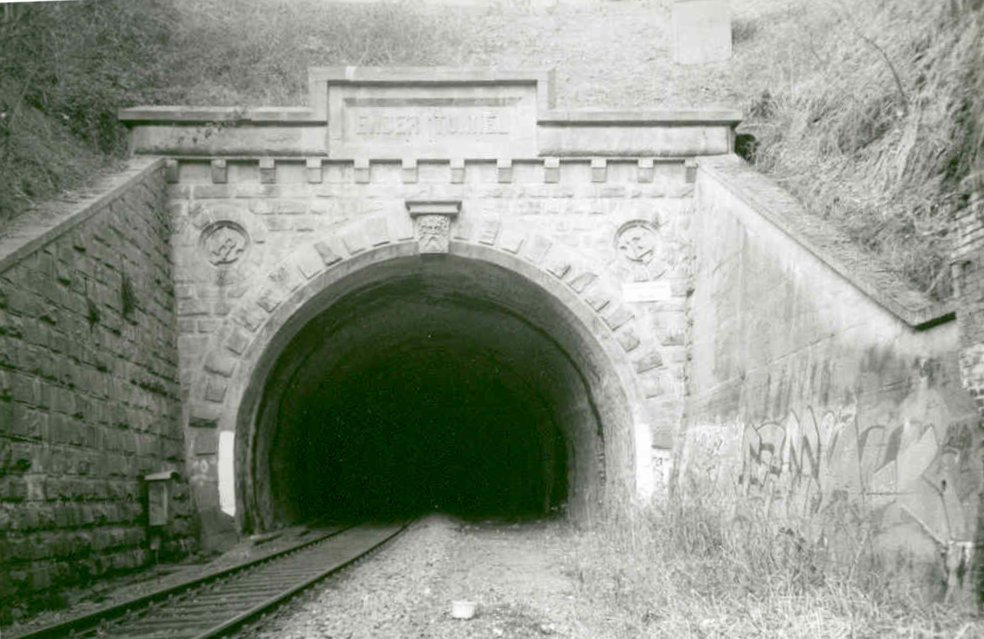
Southern portal of Ender Tunnel

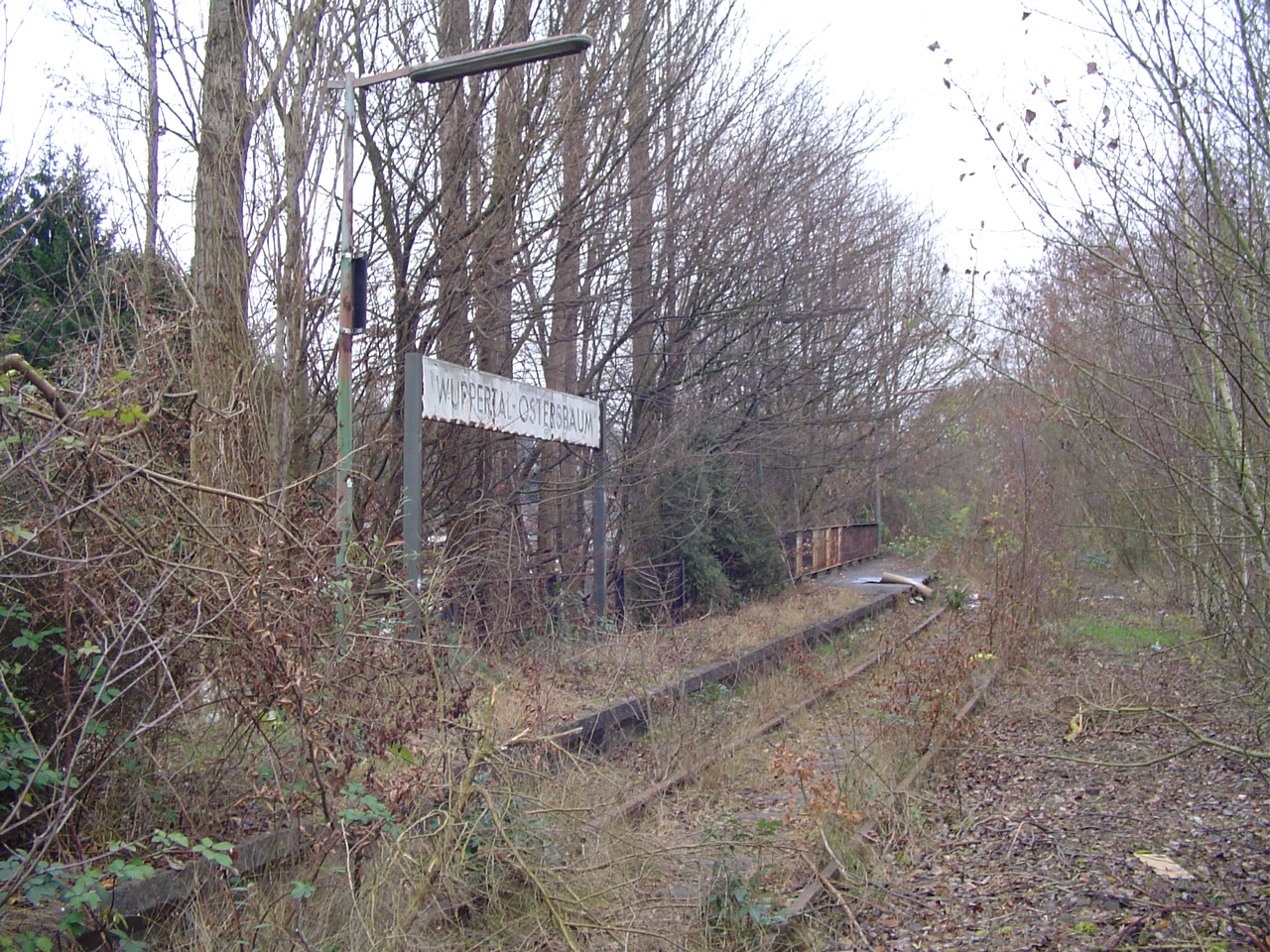
Former Wuppertal-Ostersbaum station
