= Velbert-Langenberg station =

Railway station in Velbert, Germany

Velbert Langenberg
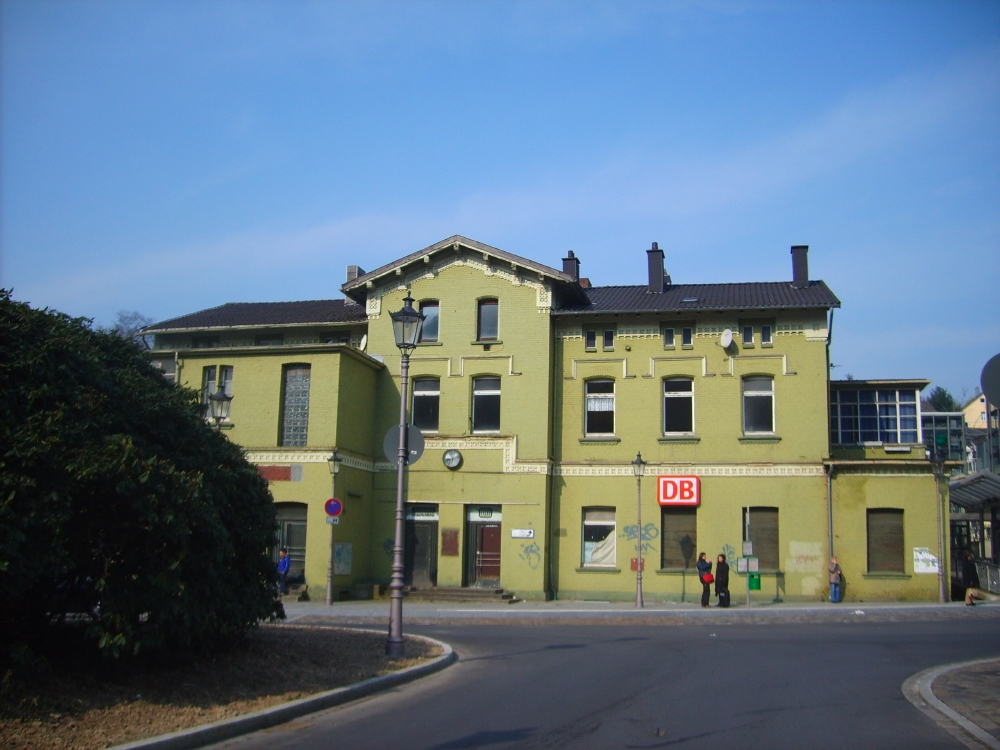

General information
- Location: Hauptstr. 6, Velbert, NRW; Germany
- Coordinates: 51°21′17″N 7°07′21″E
- Lines: W-Vohwinkel–E-Überruhr (KBS 450.9)
- Platforms: 2

Construction
- Accessible: Yes

Other information
- Station code: 3529
- DS100 code: ELBG
- IBNR: 8003529
- Category: 5
- Fare zone: VRR: 552
- Website: www.bahnhof.de

History
- Opened: 1 December 1847

Services
Preceding station	DB Regio NRW	Following station
Essen-Kupferdreh towards Wesel	RE 49	Velbert-Neviges towards Wuppertal Hbf
Preceding station	Rhine-Ruhr S-Bahn	Following station
Velbert-Nierenhof towards Haltern am See or Recklinghausen Hbf	S9	Velbert-Neviges towards Hagen Hbf
Location

Velbert-Langenberg station is located in the city of Velbert in the German state of North Rhine-Westphalia. It is on the Wuppertal-Vohwinkel–Essen-Überruhr line and is classified by Deutsche Bahn as a category 5 station. It was built in 1847.

== History ==
Velbert-Langenberg station was opened by the Prince William Railway Company (Prinz-Wilhelm-Eisenbahn-Gesellschaft) north of the centre of the then independent municipality of Langenberg together with the Wuppertal-Vohwinkel–Essen-Überruhr railway on 1 December 1847. Since Langenberg was incorporated into Velbert in 1975, the name of the station was changed in December 2003 from Langenberg (Rheinl) to Velbert-Langenberg.

In 1986, Deutsche Bundesbahn replaced the two mechanical signal boxes "Lf" and "Ln" with a relay signal box, which was given the name "Lf" (Langenberg Fahrdienstleiter—dispatcher). This signal box has been remotely controlled from Essen-Steele since 2004.

Of the previously extensive system of tracks (including several loading ramps and sidings) after several phases of track dismantling, a side track north of the platforms has been preserved next to the two main tracks, which is now used, for example, by trains to and from the Hesper Valley Railway (Hespertalbahn) as the tracksto Essen-Kupferdreh is connected only to the track running towards Wuppertal and the first chance to change to the track to the north is in Langenberg. This makes it the last remaining Bahnhof (defined as a station with at least one set of points) between Essen-Steele and Wuppertal-Vohwinkel, all the other stations are categorised as Haltepunkte (halts).

=== Entrance building ===
Today's large entrance building was built in 1864 and originally also served as the headquarters of the Prince William Railway Company. In contrast to the earlier buildings of the Prince William Railway, it consists of field-fired bricks (Feldbrandziegeln, a pre-industrial method of brick making) with only a few sandstone elements and shows echoes of Tudor architecture with dormer windows and battlements. It is located at the southern end of the platforms and is no longer used. It was first renovated in 1888, when a second track was laid from Aprath station to Langenberg. After the Second World War, the historic platform canopy was removed and the window lintels on the ground floor were lowered. The trackbed is now higher relative to the building than originally. In 2016, it was returned to its former red paint scheme after the building had been painted green in the 1990s.

== Location and operations ==
The station is on the Wuppertal-Vohwinkel–Essen-Überruhr railway at km 18.5. It is served by the RE49 Regional-Express service, known as the Wupper-Lippe-Express, every 60 minutes, and S-Bahn line S 9, every 30 minutes.

S 9: Recklinghausen / Haltern am See - Gladbeck - Bottrop - Essen - Velbert - Wuppertal - Hagen

The scheduled travel time from Langenberg station is about 18 minutes (RE 49) or 22 minutes (S 9) to Essen Hauptbahnhof and 20 minutes (RE 49) or 26 minutes (S 9) to Wuppertal Hauptbahnhof. The station is located at the northern end of central Langenberg. It is the starting point for two regional bus routes OV 6 und OV 7 and several municipal bus routes. The municipal bus routes connect Langenberg with central Velbert. Furthermore, some regional bus lines run from Velbert-Langenberg to Nierenhof, Neviges, Hattingen, Wuppertal-Elberfeld and Wuppertal-Barmen.
