= Essen-Überruhr station =

Railway station in Essen, Germany

Essen Überruhr
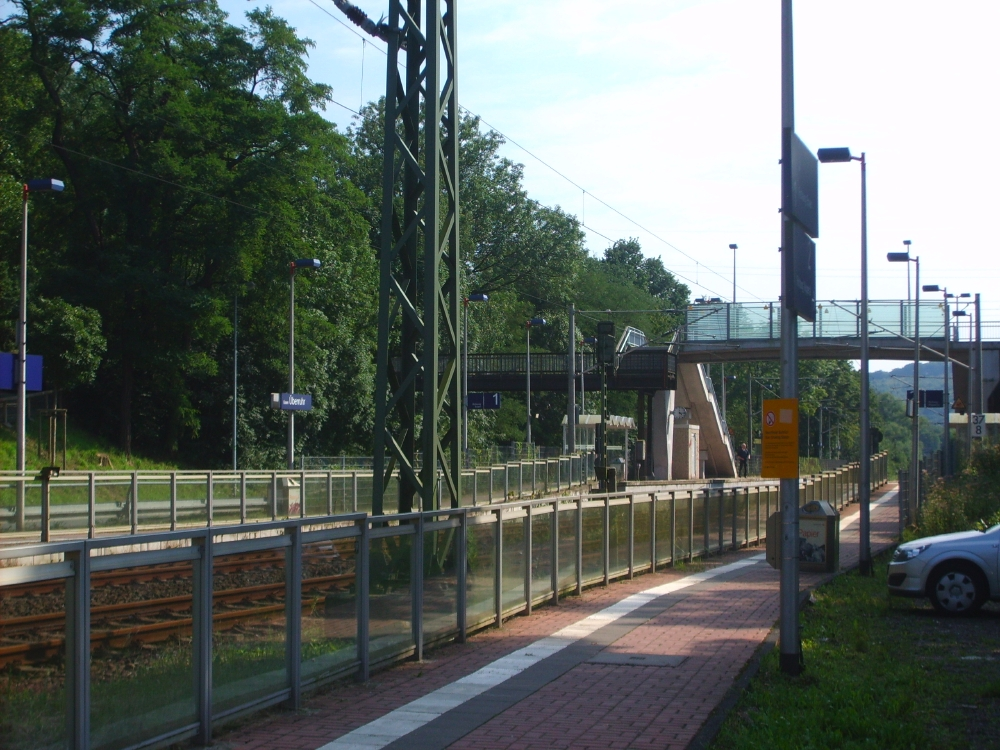

General information
- Location: Langenbergerstr. 511, Essen, NRW; Germany
- Coordinates: 51°25′45″N 7°04′09″E
- Lines: Wuppertal–Essen-Überruhr (KBS 450.9)
- Platforms: 2

Construction
- Accessible: Yes

Other information
- Station code: 1712
- DS100 code: EEUE
- IBNR: 8001914
- Category: 6
- Fare zone: VRR: 358
- Website: www.bahnhof.de

History
- Opened: 1 December 1847

Services
Preceding station	Rhine-Ruhr S-Bahn	Following station
Essen-Steele towards Haltern am See or Recklinghausen Hbf	S9	Essen-Holthausen towards Hagen Hbf
Location

Essen-Überruhr station is located in the district of Überruhr in the city of Essen in the German state of North Rhine-Westphalia. It is on the Wuppertal-Vohwinkel–Essen-Überruhr line and is classified by Deutsche Bahn as a category 6 station.

The station was opened on 1 December 1847 by the Prince William Railway Company as the northern terminus of its Vohwinkel–Überruhr line, after its takeover, standardisation and extension of the Deil Valley Railway Company's line from Kupferdreh to Nierenhof (the oldest German railway).

== Location and layout ==
The station has two side platforms. These can be reached via stairs. A bridge structure runs from the two side platforms over Langenberger Straße, which runs parallel to the east of the railway line, to Nockwinkel. To the west of the railway is a water protection area and beyond it the Rellinghausen district on the other side of the Ruhr. Therefore the station is not directly connected to Rellinghausen. Instead, Rellinghausen is reached via the Konrad Adenauer Bridge over the Ruhr, which is several hundred metres to the south. The bus stop located there is called Lehmanns Brink.

== History and character ==
The first Überruhr station was opened in 1844 as the terminus of the Wuppertal railway line under the name Steele gegenüber ("across from Steele") in the Drehscheibe street area. From 1861, the Bergisch-Markisch Railway Company (Bergisch-Märkische Eisenbahn-Gesellschaft) built the Ruhr bridge in Steele and with it the railway line to the former Königssteele station (now Essen-Steele Ost). The line was completed by the Prince William Railway Company (Prinz-Wilhelm-Eisenbahn-Gesellschaft).

After the bridge was completed in 1863, the old Steele gegenüber station served as a line control post. As a replacement for it, the new Überruhr station, which developed into the current station, was built in the area of today's Langenberger Straße. Überruhr was renamed Essen-Überruhr in 1950. The station building was demolished in 1968. The station was rebuilt in 1978 and it was rededicated a year later. The new connecting curve from Überruhr to Steele was established in 1978. This eliminated the need to reverse trains in Essen-Steele Ost.

The station was served by the N 9 local passenger service until 1998. S-Bahn line S 9 was introduced between Haltern am See and Essen and RB 49 was introduced between Essen and Wuppertal in 1998 as part of the reorganisation of train services. After the electrification of the line between Essen and Wuppertal was completed, the RB 49 service was replaced in December 2003 by the S 9, which has connected Haltern and Wuppertal ever since.

== Operations ==
The station is served by Rhine-Ruhr S-Bahn line S 9 (Recklinghausen / Haltern – Gladbeck - Essen - Wuppertal - Hagen), operating every 30 minutes during the day. Services operated every 20 minutes prior to 2019.
