= Hardenberger Bach =

River in Germany

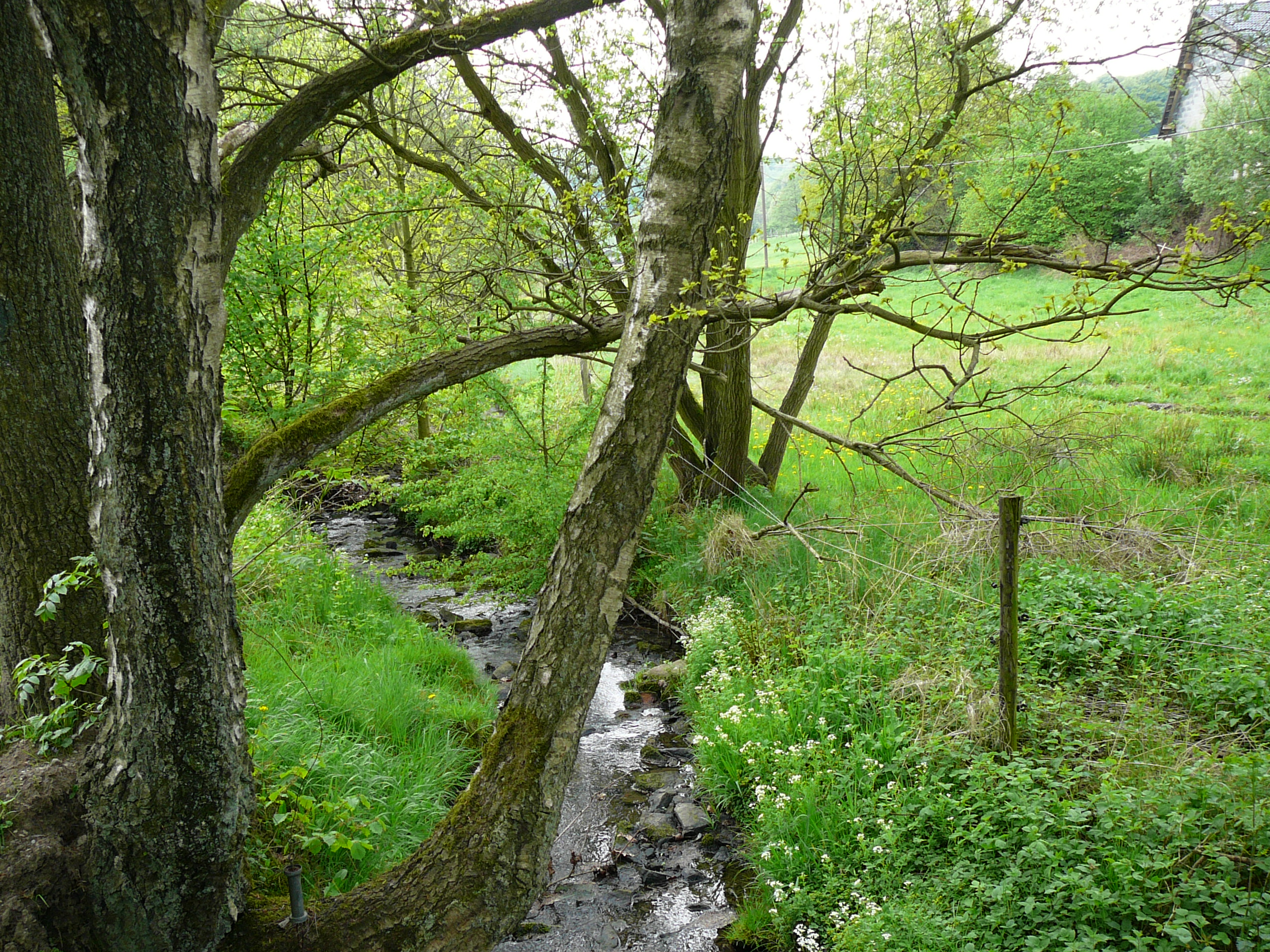

Location
- Country: Germany
- State: North Rhine-Westphalia

Physical characteristics
- Mouth
  - location: Deilbach
  - coordinates: 51.3529°N 7.1221°E
- Length: 13.2 km (8.2 mi)

Basin features
- Progression: Deilbach→ Ruhr→ Rhine→ North Sea

Hardenberger Bach is a river of North Rhine-Westphalia, Germany. It flows into the Deilbach in Langenberg.

== See also ==
- List of rivers of North Rhine-Westphalia
