= Essen-Holthausen station =

Rhine-Ruhr S-Bahn station

Essen Holthausen
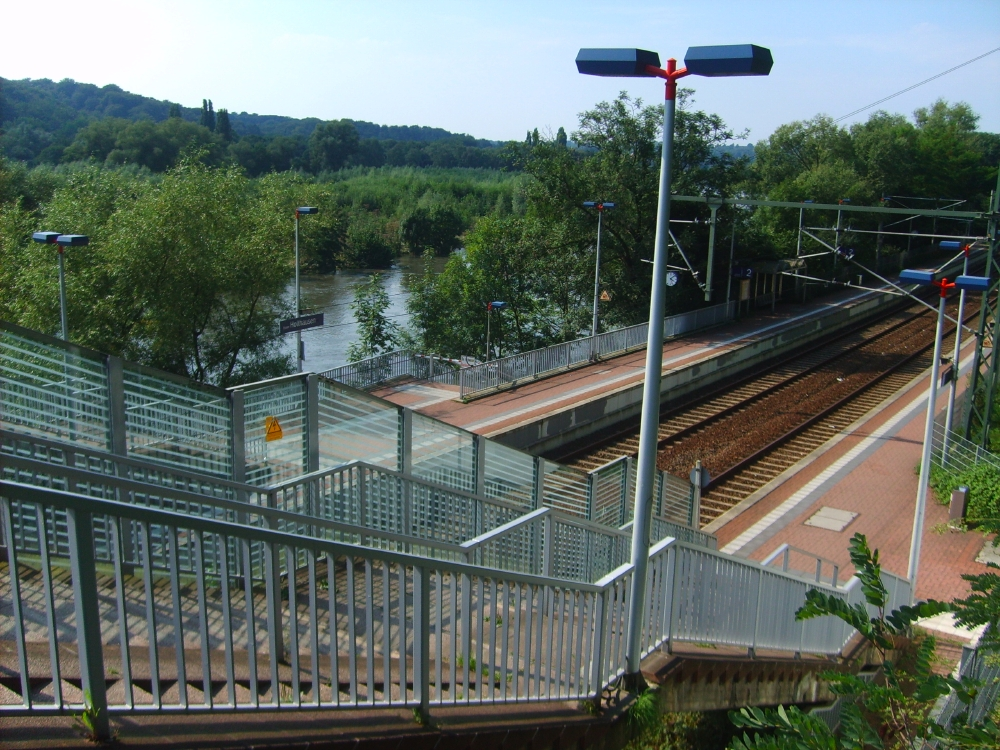

General information
- Location: Langenberger Str. 564, Essen, NRW; Germany
- Coordinates: 51°25′03″N 7°04′22″E
- Lines: Wuppertal–Essen (KBS 450.9)
- Platforms: 2

Construction
- Accessible: Yes

Other information
- Station code: 1703
- DS100 code: EEHH
- IBNR: 8006514
- Category: 6
- Fare zone: VRR: 358
- Website: www.bahnhof.de

History
- Opened: 1945–46; 29 September 1985

Services
Preceding station	Rhine-Ruhr S-Bahn	Following station
Essen-Überruhr towards Haltern am See or Recklinghausen Hbf	S9	Essen-Kupferdreh towards Hagen Hbf
Location

Essen-Holthausen station is located in the district of Überruhr in the city of Essen in the German state of North Rhine-Westphalia. It is on the Wuppertal-Vohwinkel–Essen-Überruhr line.

== Location and layout ==
The station has two side platforms. These can be reached via stairs and lifts. A bridge structure connects these two side platforms to Langenberger Straße just over 100 metre to the east, where the Holthausen Bf stop of the Ruhrbahn is located.

== History and character ==
The station was opened in 1945 to serve the Heinrich colliery, but was closed again a year later. It was reopened for passenger transport on the N 9 local service in 1985. S-Bahn line S 9 was introduced between Haltern am See and Essen and RB 49 was introduced between Essen and Wuppertal in 1998 as part of the reordering of train numbers. After electrification of the line between Essen and Wuppertal was completed, the RB 49 service was replaced in December 2003 by the S 9, which has connected Haltern and Wuppertal ever since. In 2020, the line S 9 was expended to Hagen and Recklinghausen.

== Operations ==
The station is served by Rhine-Ruhr S-Bahn line S 9 (Recklinghausen / Haltern – Gladbeck - Essen - Wuppertal - Hagen), operating every 30 minutes during the day. It is also served by bus route 177, which runs parallel to the S-Bahn line on Langenberger Straße, and at night by route NE6, both operated by Ruhrbahn. These serve the Holthausen Bf stop located more than 100 metres east, but on the level of the station.
