= Velbert-Neviges station =

Railway station in Neviges, Germany

Velbert Neviges
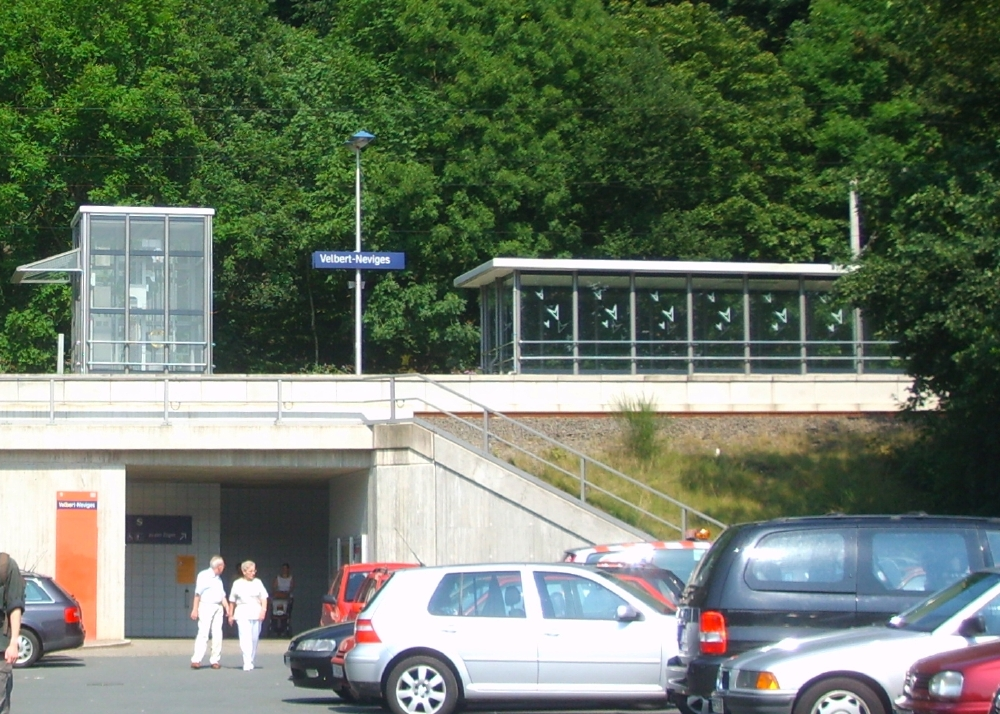

General information
- Location: Auf der Beek 1, Velbert, NRW; Germany
- Coordinates: 51°18′48″N 7°05′25″E
- Owner: Deutsche Bahn
- Operator: DB Netz; DB Station&Service
- Lines: W-Vohwinkel–E-Überruhr (KBS 450.9)
- Platforms: 2

Construction
- Accessible: Yes

Other information
- Station code: 4469
- DS100 code: ENV
- IBNR: 8004340
- Category: 5
- Fare zone: VRR: 554
- Website: www.bahnhof.de

History
- Opened: Original site: 1 December 1847; Current site: 2003

Services
| Preceding station | DB Regio NRW | Following station |
|---|---|---|
| Velbert-Langenberg towards Wesel | RE 49 | Wuppertal-Vohwinkel towards Wuppertal Hbf |
| Preceding station | Rhine-Ruhr S-Bahn | Following station |
| Velbert-Langenberg towards Haltern am See or Recklinghausen Hbf | S9 | Velbert-Rosenhügel towards Hagen Hbf |
Location

Velbert-Neviges station is located in the city of Velbert in the German state of North Rhine-Westphalia. It is on the Wuppertal-Vohwinkel–Essen-Überruhr line.

== History ==
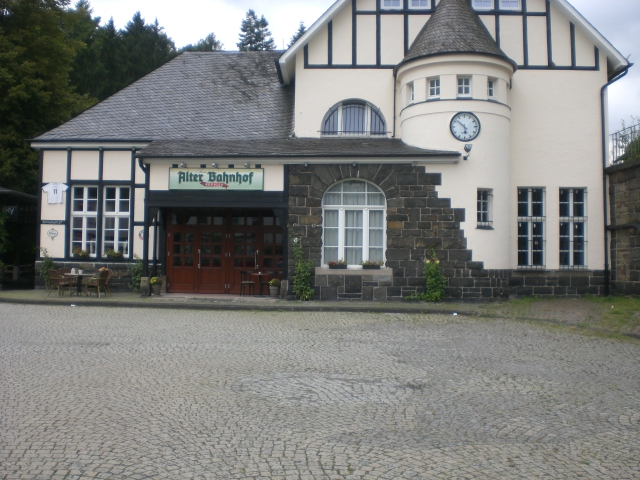
Entrance building of the original Neviges station. It is now used as a restaurant.

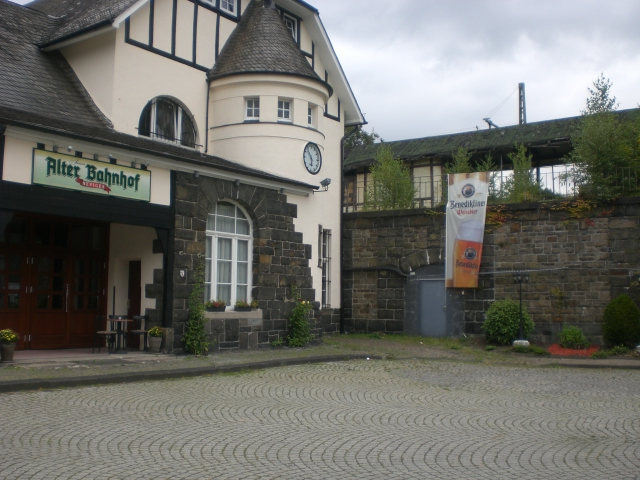
Side view of the former entrance building. The former platform can be seen in the background.

The original station was opened north of the centre of the then independent municipality of Neviges together with the Wuppertal-Vohwinkel–Essen-Überruhr railway on 1 December 1847 by the Prince William Railway Company (Prinz-Wilhelm-Eisenbahn-Gesellschaft) at line-kilometre 12.8.

Since Neviges was incorporated into Velbert in 1975, the name of the station was changed from Neviges to Velbert-Neviges in December 2003. It was also moved a few hundred metres to the vicinity of the Neviges market (Nevigeser Markt) in 2003, so that it would have a better connection to bus transport. The original station is still preserved. The former platform canopy was demolished by Deutsche Bahn in March 2019 and the former station building is now used as a restaurant. In operational terms, the new station is considered a Haltepunkt (stopping point), as it has no sets of points.

== Location and operations ==
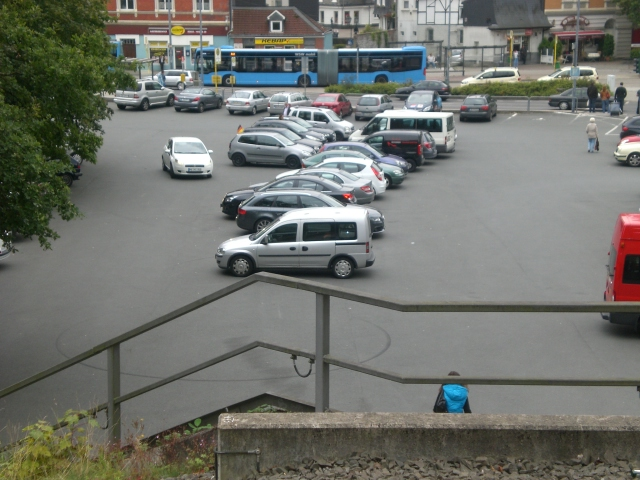
View from the S-Bahn platform to the P + R car park at Neviges station. The Neviges Markt/Bf. bus stop is in the background

The station is on the Wuppertal-Vohwinkel–Essen-Überruhr railway at km 12.5, while the old station was at km 12.8. It is served by the RE49 Regional-Express service, known as the Wupper-Lippe-Express, every 60 minutes, and S-Bahn line S 9, every 30 minutes.

S 9 :Recklinghausen / Haltern am See - Gladbeck - Bottrop - Essen - Velbert - Wuppertal - Hagen

The scheduled travel time from Velbert-Neviges station is about 23 minutes (RE 49) or 27 minutes (S 9) to Essen Hauptbahnhof and 15 minutes (RE 49) or 21 minutes (S 9) to Wuppertal Hauptbahnhof. The station is located at Neviges market, while the former Velbert-Neviges station was near the Mariendom (church). There is a park and ride facility. Behind this, there is the Neviges Markt/Bf bus stop, which is served by three regional bus routes as well as the Neviges Tönisheide municipal bus routes. The bus lines connect Neviges station with Velbert-Zentrum, Neviges-Siepen, Velbert-Langenberg, Velbert-Leberhof as well as Hattingen, Wuppertal-Elberfeld and Wuppertal-Barmen.
