= Essen-Kupferdreh station =

Railway station in Essen, Germany

Essen Kupferdreh
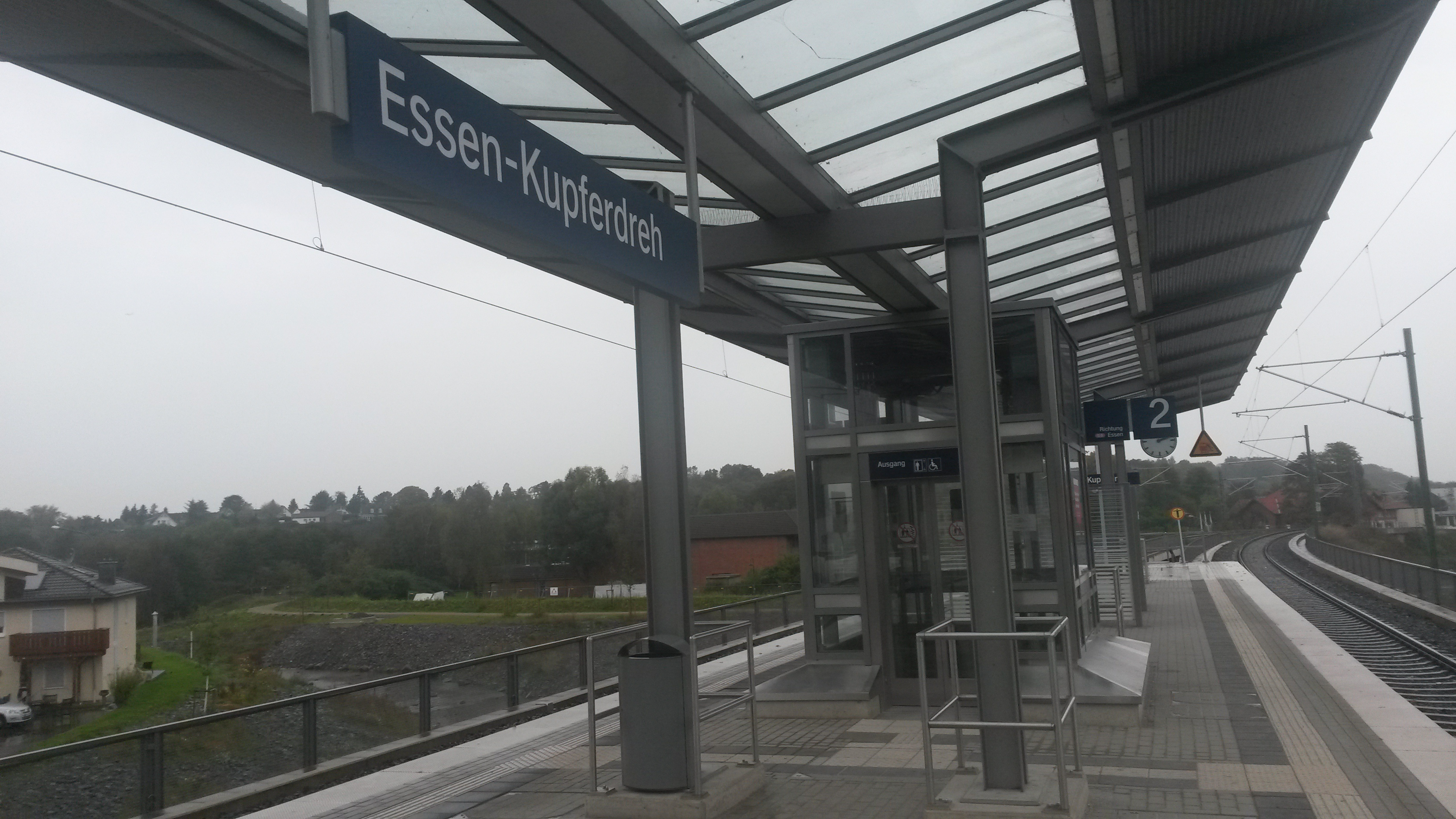

General information
- Location: Hofstraße 1, Essen, NRW; Germany
- Coordinates: 51°23′26″N 7°04′50″E
- Lines: Wuppertal–Essen (KBS 450.9)
- Platforms: 2

Construction
- Accessible: Yes

Other information
- Station code: 1709
- DS100 code: EEKU
- IBNR: 8001912
- Category: 5
- Fare zone: VRR: 358
- Website: www.bahnhof.de

History
- Opened: 1969/79

Services
Preceding station	DB Regio NRW	Following station
Essen-Steele towards Wesel	RE 49	Velbert-Langenberg towards Wuppertal Hbf
Preceding station	Rhine-Ruhr S-Bahn	Following station
Essen-Holthausen towards Haltern am See or Recklinghausen Hbf	S9	Velbert-Nierenhof towards Hagen Hbf
Location

Essen-Kupferdreh station is located in the district of Kupferdreh of the city of Essen in the German state of North Rhine-Westphalia. It is on the Wuppertal-Vohwinkel–Essen-Überruhr line and is classified by Deutsche Bahn as a category 5 station. It was built between 1969 and 1979, replacing the nearby Old Kupferdreh station. In the 2010–12 period, the track near the station was elevated and the side platforms were replaced by an island platform.

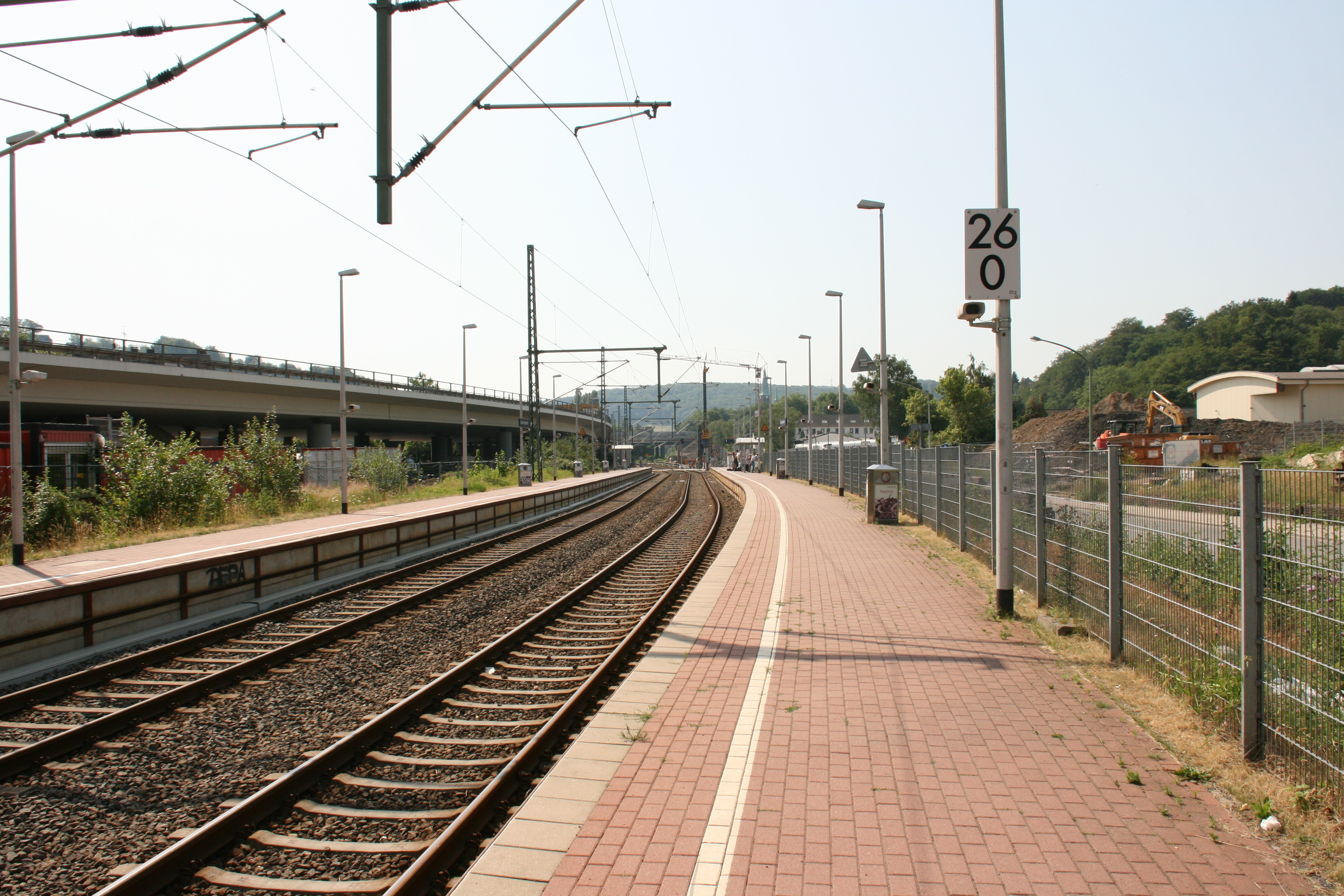
Platforms before the elevation

The station is served by the RE49 Regional-Express service, known as the Wupper-Lippe-Express, every 60 minutes, and S-Bahn line S 9 (Recklinghausen / Haltern – Gladbeck - Bottrop - Essen - Wuppertal - Hagen), operating every 30 minutes during the day.

It is also served by bus route 141 operated by Verkehrsgesellschaft Ennepe-Ruhr at 30-minute intervals during the day. It is also served by bus routes 155, 177 and 180, operated by Ruhrbahn at 20- or 30-minute intervals during the day.
