= Wülfrath-Aprath station =

Railway station in Wülfrath, Germany

Wülfrath-Aprath
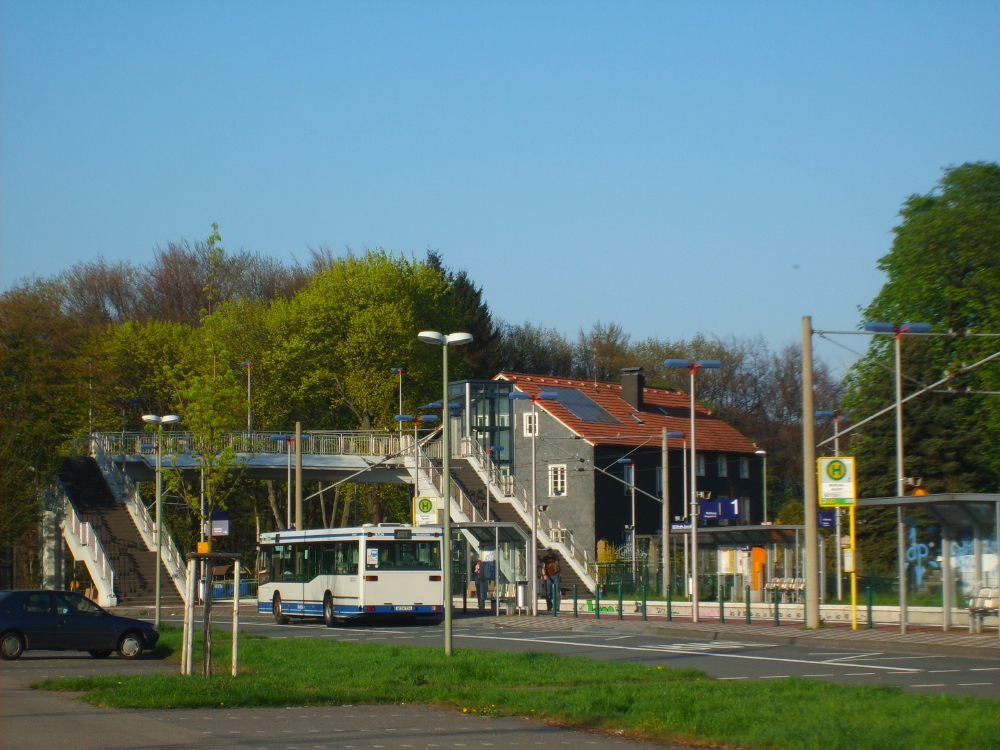

General information
- Location: Voisberger Weg 1, Wülfrath, NRW; Germany
- Coordinates: 51°16′04″N 7°04′19″E
- Lines: W-Vohwinkel–E-Überruhr (KBS 450.9)
- Platforms: 2

Construction
- Accessible: Yes

Other information
- Station code: 5004
- DS100 code: EWAP
- IBNR: 8006575
- Category: 5
- Fare zone: VRR: 542 and 656
- Website: www.bahnhof.de

History
- Opened: 1 December 1847

Services
| Preceding station | Rhine-Ruhr S-Bahn | Following station |
|---|---|---|
| Velbert-Rosenhügel towards Haltern am See or Recklinghausen Hbf | S9 | Wuppertal-Vohwinkel towards Hagen Hbf |
Location

Wülfrath-Aprath station is located in the town of Wülfrath in the German state of North Rhine-Westphalia. It is on the Wuppertal-Vohwinkel–Essen-Überruhr line. The station was originally opened in 1847, but closed in 1964 or 1965. A station building was built in 1848, but it burnt down in 1990. The station was re-established in 2002 and is classified by Deutsche Bahn as a category 5 station.

The station is served by Rhine-Ruhr S-Bahn line S 9 (Recklinghausen / Haltern– Gladbeck - Wuppertal - Hagen), operating every 30 minutes during the day.

It is also served by two bus routes operated by WSW mobil: 601 (at 60 minute intervals) and 621 (at 20 minute intervals).
