= Ramsauer =

Surname

Ramsauer is a German surname. Notable people with the surname include:

- Carl Ramsauer (1879–1955), professor of physics who discovered of the Ramsauer-Townsend effect
- Dieter Ramsauer (1939–2021), German engineer
- Johann Georg Ramsauer (1795–1874), Austrian mine operator, director of the excavations at the Hallstatt cemetery from 1846 to 1863
- Katharina Ramsauer (born 1995), Austrian freestyle skier
- Ken Ramsauer (1954–1983), American businessman
- Peter Ramsauer (born 1954), German politician

== See also ==
- Ramsauer Ache, a river of Bavaria, Germany
- Ramsauer–Townsend effect, physical phenomenon involving the scattering of low-energy electrons by atoms of a noble gas
