= Velbert-Rosenhügel station =

Railway station in Velbert, Germany

Velbert Rosenhügel
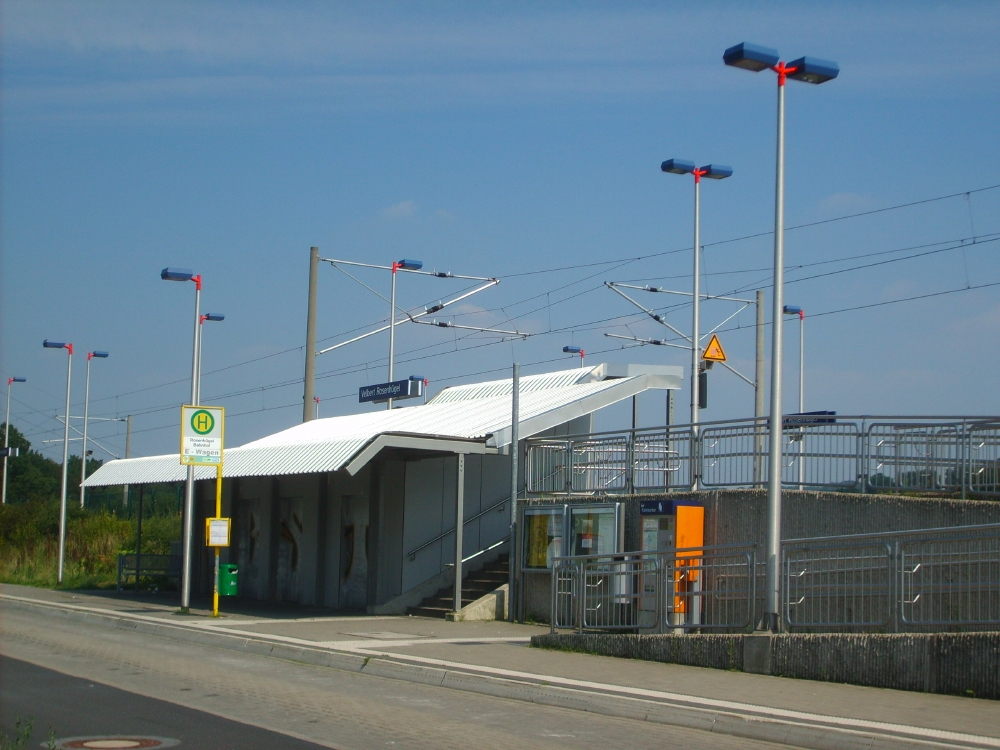

General information
- Location: Am Rosenhügel 95, Velbert, NRW; Germany
- Coordinates: 51°18′02″N 7°06′08″E
- Lines: Wuppertal-Vohwinkel–Essen-Überruhr (KBS 450.9)
- Platforms: 2

Construction
- Accessible: Yes

Other information
- Station code: 5560
- DS100 code: EVLR
- IBNR: 8006064
- Category: 6
- Fare zone: VRR: 554
- Website: www.bahnhof.de

History
- Opened: 14 December 2003

Services
Preceding station	Rhine-Ruhr S-Bahn	Following station
Velbert-Neviges towards Haltern am See or Recklinghausen Hbf	S9	Wülfrath-Aprath towards Hagen Hbf
Location

Velbert-Rosenhügel station is located in the city of Velbert in the German state of North Rhine-Westphalia. It is on the Wuppertal-Vohwinkel–Essen-Überruhr line. It was built in 2003 and is classified by Deutsche Bahn as a category 6 station.

The station is served by Rhine-Ruhr S-Bahn line S 9 (Recklinghausen / Haltern – Gladbeck - Bottrop - Essen - Velbert - Wuppertal -Hagen ), operating every 30 minutes during the day.

It is also served by three bus routes operated by WSW mobil: 627 (at 60 minute intervals), 647 (at 20 minute intervals) and 649 (at 20 minute intervals).
