= Prince William Railway Company =

Coordinates: 51°18′13″N 7°07′15″E

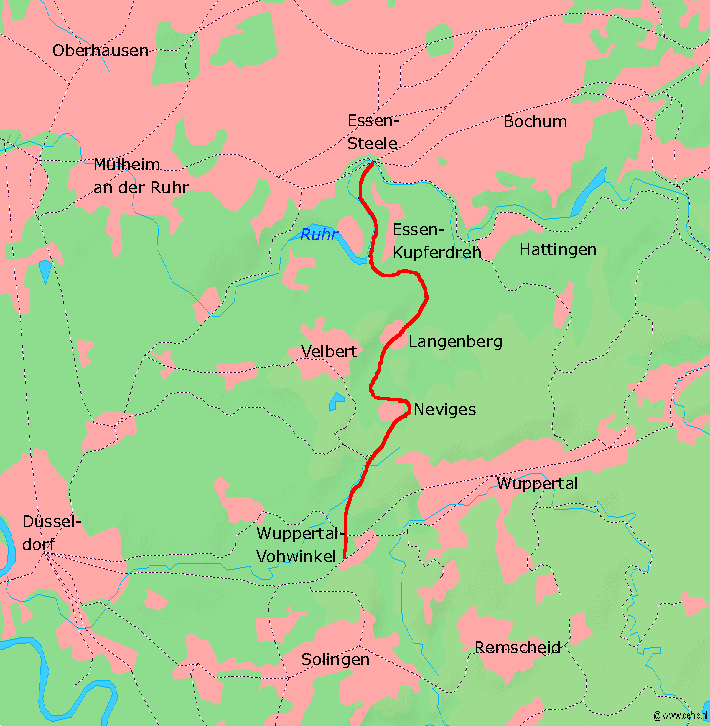
Prince William Railway route map

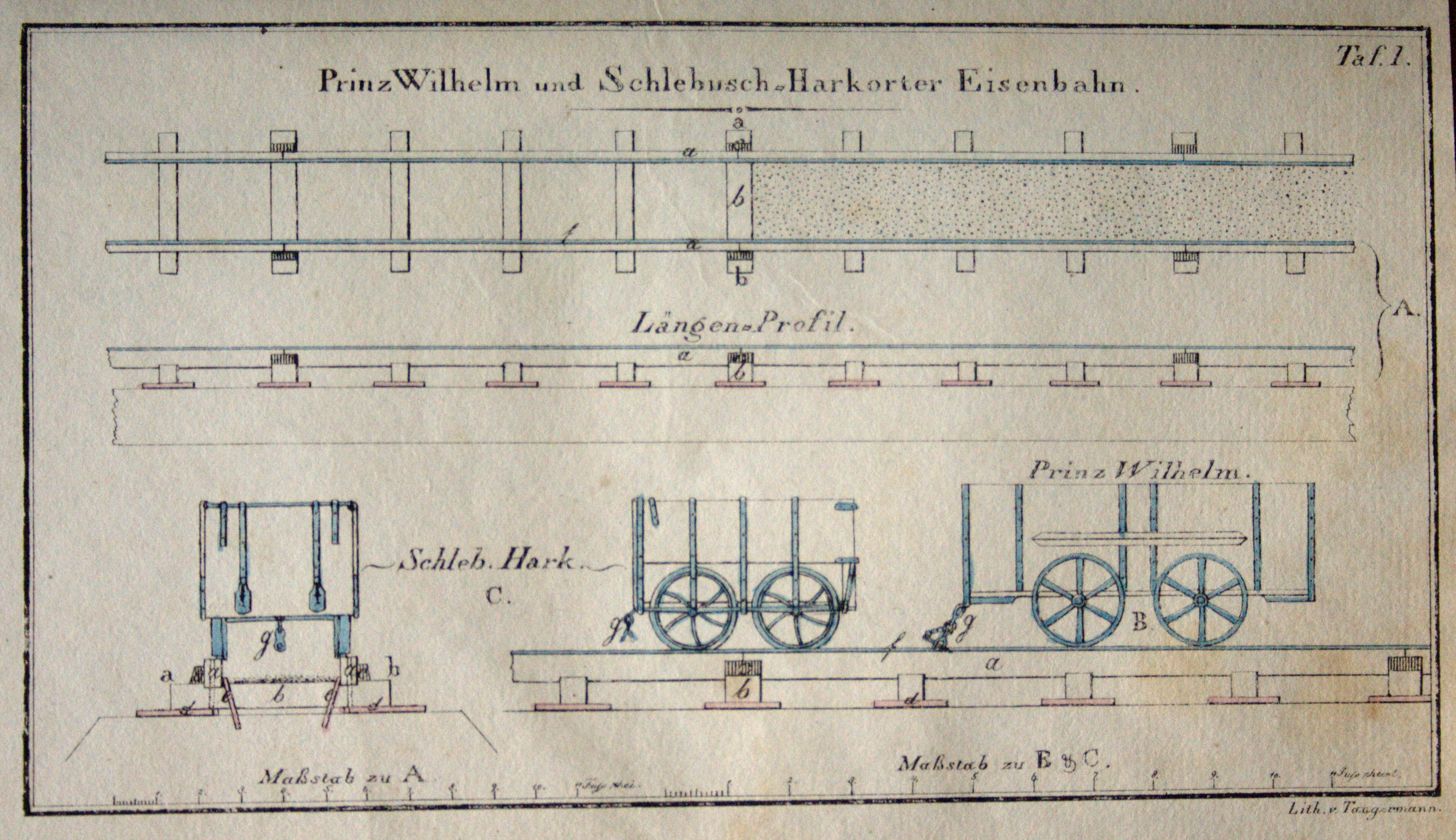
Tracks and carriages

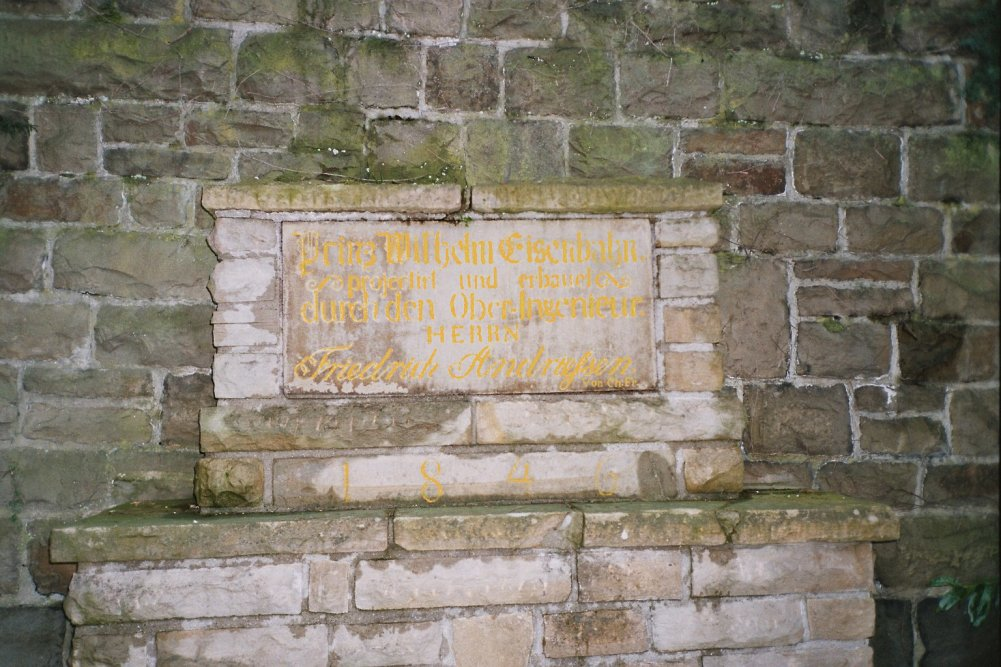
Commemorative plaque for the opening of the Prince William Railway Company's line at Neviges station

The Prince William Railway Company (German: Prinz-Wilhelm-Eisenbahn-Gesellschaft, PWE) was an early horse-drawn railway in Germany. It was founded as the Deil Valley Railway Company (Deilthaler Eisenbahn Aktiengesellschaft) in 1828 and renamed in 1831. It built a 820 mm (2 ft 8 9/32 in) narrow gauge line that ran for a Prussian mile (7,532 metres or 8,237 yards) along the Deilbach valley from a point near Kupferdreh Old Station in Hinsbeck, a suburb of Kupferdreh (now part of Essen), to Nierenhof near Langenberg (now part of Velbert). This route is now part of the Wuppertal-Vohwinkel–Essen-Überruhr railway and served by Rhine-Ruhr S-Bahn line S9 trains.

On 20 September 1831 the railway was opened by Prince William, the brother of the King of Prussia at the time, and renamed in honour of the prince. It operated as a horse-drawn railway carrying coal until 1844, but from 1833 it also carried passengers. In 1847, it was converted to 1,435 mm (4 ft 8 1/2 in) standard gauge, extended north to Steele Süd and south to Vohwinkel (in Wuppertal), converted to steam operation and renamed the Steele-Vohwinkler Eisenbahn.

== Background ==
Friedrich Harkort had an early interest in improving the transportation of coal from the Ruhr in the Bergisches Land to Wuppertal. He therefore visited England to study the first railway projects and wrote in 1825 in the journal Hermann an article on "Railways". He sought the interest of donors to realise such a project. He finally found interest mainly in the mining trades in the Ruhr. In 1826 he had built a small test track, as a monorail following a design of the Englishman Henry Robinson Palmer. This was a precursor to the Wuppertal Schwebebahn finally built 74 years later. On 9 September 1826 he advised the Elberfeld Council two routes for the construction of such a railway from Elberfeld via Uellendahl, Horath and Herzkamp to Hinsbeck or from Elberfeld via Horath to Langenberg. In 1826 and 1827 surveying were carried out in these districts.

Another railway pioneer, school teacher Peter Nikolaus Caspar Egen, however, favoured the construction of a normal rail railway. While Egen and Harkort fought out their differences, and even before an application for a concession was made, opposition began to surface from carters and horse drivers engaged in coal transportation. Meanwhile, the neighboring city of Barmen was also active with its own plans, as it felt disadvantaged by Elberfeld’s plans.

The time was not ripe for such a project using completely new technology. People were reluctant to invest their money in it. Even the king of Prussia who ultimately had to approve any plans, did not understand the proposals.

== Deil Valley Railway Company ==
But in order just to make a start, Harkort then proposed a "stripped down" version. He founded the Deil Valley Railway Company, the first German railway joint stock company in 1828 with his brother, the industrialist Ludwig Mohl, Peter Nikolaus Caspar Egen, Dr. Voss (a physician and miner from Steele, now part of Essen) and Reichmann and Meyberg (merchants from Langenberg). In 1830 and 1831 the Deil Valley Railway was built up the Deilbach valley from Hinsbeck, a suburb of Kupferdreh (now part of Essen), to Nierenhof near Langenberg (now part of Velbert). This line was already called a "railway" because it had iron wheels on iron rails. It was built on oak sleepers, on which two 3.30 m (10 ft 9 7/8 in) long planks called Straßbäume, ("street trees") were secured with wooden nails. The Straßbäume were covered with a running surface of 40 mm (1 9/16 in) thick iron, known, using British terminology as a plateway. The line ran for a Prussian mile (7,532 metres or 8,237 yards), and its gauge was 820 mm (2 ft 8 9/32 in) narrow-gauge.

The railway was built to be operated by relay. The route was divided into three 700 Prussian rod (3.766 metres or 4.119 yards) long (2.636 kilometres or 1.638 miles in total) relay sections and four 25 rod (94 m or 308 ft 5 in) long transitional sections. The transitional sections were at the beginning and end of the line, at "Kupperdrehe" and Eisenhammer in Deilmannhof im Deilbachtal. At these passing places the horses were changed so that the horses that had pulled up the full wagons were unhitched and attached to empty wagons for their return. A total of seven horses were required. On the flat track next to the Ruhr only one or two horses were needed for the coal train. On the uphill route to Nierenhof, in contrast, three or four horses were required.

== Prince William Railway ==
On 20 September 1831 Prince William of Prussia, the youngest brother of King Frederick William III, officially opened the railway. On this day the prince and his family travelled on coal wagons lined with carpets. The railway was allowed to call itself the Prince William Railway afterwards.

Until 1844, the Prince William railway was operated by horse-drawn wagons to transport coal. After one year of operation passengers were also transported, in particular on the return journey from Nierenhof to Hinsbeck, for which no cargo was available. By 1833 there were some coaches available for “pleasure”.

== Steele-Vohwinkel Railway ==
As the operation of the railway satisfied its shareholders, it was decided to extend it in 1840. On 23 August the company wrote to the district administration to request a concession for the extension. On 29 June 1844 the Treasury gave permission for the company to build an extension in the north to Steele and in the south to Vohwinkel.

To get the necessary funds, it needed to issue new shares. It offered purchasers of shares the guarantee of favourable freight rates, but the mining companies rejected this. Eventually it procured sufficient capital and on 29 July 1844 construction started. The line was rebuilt as 1,435 mm (4 ft 8 1/2 in) standard gauge and extended in both directions. The 32-kilometre-long (20 mi) railway line opened as the "Steele-Vohwinkel Railway" on 1 December 1847 as a steam railway from Überruhr (south of the Ruhr, opposite Steele) to Vohwinkel via Kupferdreh, Langenberg and Neviges.

Between Neviges and Vohwinkel the trains had to climb a slope, which at this time could only be climbed with the aid of a zig zag. At the terminal station (German: Kopfstation, literally head station) built in 1847 in the Siebeneick Valley trains had run into the station before reversing on to the other line out of the station. This arrangement was eliminated in 1862 when a new alignment was built, but the whole area still bears the name Kopfstation.

== Bergisch-Märkische Railway Company's acquisition of the company ==
On 13 March 1854 the Bergisch-Märkische Railway Company (German: Bergisch-Märkische Eisenbahn-Gesellschaft, BME) took over the operation of the route. Under an agreement of 6 December 1862 the BME legally acquired the Prince William Railway Company on 1 January 1863. The BME connected the line to its network and extended it over the Ruhr to Steele (now Essen-Steele-Ost). After the BME was taken over by the Prussian state railways in 1882 trains stopped serving the old station at Kupferdreh.
