= Velbert =

- Town
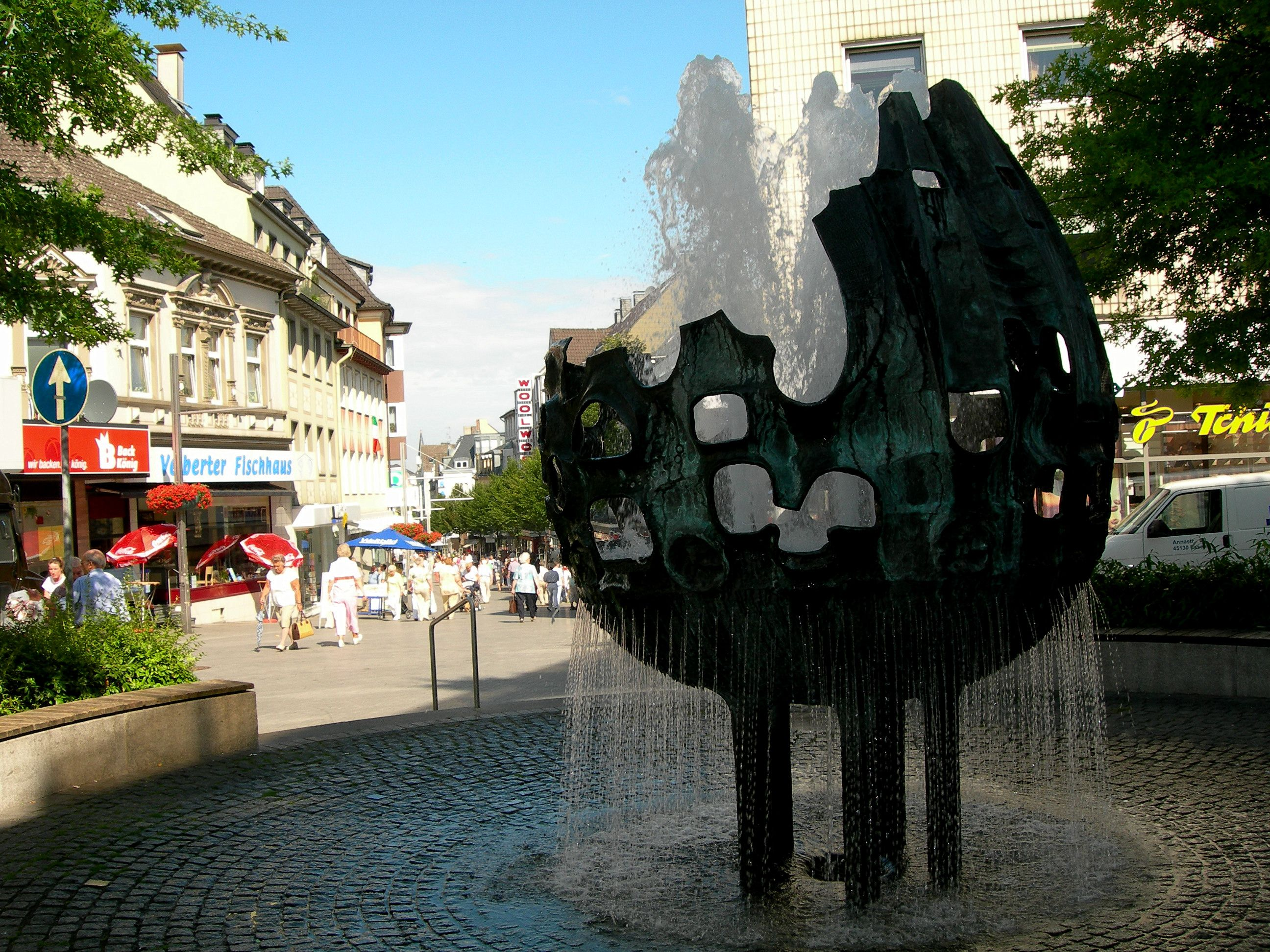

- Flag Coat of arms

- Location of Velbert within Mettmann district
- Interactive map of Velbert
- Location within Germany Location within North Rhine-Westphalia
- Coordinates: 51°20′N 7°3′E
- Country: Germany
- State: North Rhine-Westphalia
- Admin. region: Düsseldorf
- District: Mettmann
- Subdivisions: 3

Government
  - Mayor (2020–25): Dirk Lukrafka (CDU)

Area
  - Total: 74.9 km^{2} (28.9 sq mi)
- Elevation: 230 m (750 ft)

Population (2025-12-31)
  - Total: 82,166
  - Density: 1,100/km^{2} (2,840/sq mi)
- Time zone: UTC+01:00 (CET)
  - Summer (DST): UTC+02:00 (CEST)
- Postal codes: 42549–42555
- Dialling codes: 02051–02053
- Vehicle registration: ME
- Website: www.velbert.de

Velbert (German pronunciation: [ˈfɛlbɐt], Low Rhenish: Vèlbed) is a town in the district of Mettmann, in the German state of North Rhine-Westphalia. The town is renowned worldwide for the production of locks and fittings.

== Geography ==
Velbert is located on the hills of 'Niederberg' (meaning Lower Mountain), part of the Berg region, approx. 20 kilometres north-east of the capital of North Rhine-Westphalia, Düsseldorf, and 12 kilometers north-west of Wuppertal on the south side of the Ruhr river.

Velbert stands on the highest part of the Niederberg region and also in its centre. Its average elevation is around 230 metres above sea level; its highest point, at 303 metres, is the Hordt-Berg, and its lowest, at around 70.6 metres, is in Nierenhof am Deilbach. The highest point in Velbert itself is 263 metres above sea level, at the corner of Friedrichstraße and Langenberger Straße.

As part of the reform of local government districts in North Rhine-Westphalia that came into effect on 1 January 1975, the formerly independent cities of Velbert, Neviges and Langenberg were merged to form the present city of Velbert.

== History ==
Velbert was first mentioned in AD 875 as Feldbrahti and was ruled by the abbey at Werden.

== Population ==
Historical population

Year	Pop.	±% p.a.
1965	92,012	—
1970	96,021	+0.86%
1975	95,958	−0.01%
1980	93,063	−0.61%
1985	88,406	−1.02%
1990	89,253	+0.19%
1995	89,786	+0.12%

Year	Pop.	±% p.a.
2000	89,782	−0.00%
2005	87,378	−0.54%
2010	84,033	−0.78%
2015	81,430	−0.63%
2020	81,564	+0.03%
2025	82,166	+0.15%

Source: Landesdatabank Nordrhein-Westfalen

== Administration ==
Velbert is divided into three administrative areas, reflecting the three former cities: Velbert-Mitte (Central Velbert), Neviges and Langenberg. There are also numerous suburbs, including Tönisheide, Losenburg, Nordpark, Langenhorst, Birth, Röttgen and Hefel.

== Politics ==
The current mayor of Velbert has been Dirk Lukrafka of the Christian Democratic Union (CDU) since 2014. The most recent mayoral election was held on 13 September 2020, with a runoff held on 27 September, and the results were as follows:

Candidate	Party	First round		Second round	
Candidate	Party	Votes	%	Votes	%
Dirk Lukrafka	Christian Democratic Union	12,730	40.9	12,352	50.4
Esther Kanschat	Alliance 90/The Greens	6,686	21.5	12,132	49.6
Rainer Hübinger	Social Democratic Party	5,148	16.5		
August-Friedrich Tonscheid	Velbert Differently	1,915	6.2		
Cem Demircan	Independent Velbert Citizens	1,862	6.0		
Helmut Stiegelmeier	Pirate Party Germany	1,262	4.1		
Birgit Onori	The Left	1,009	3.2		
Marcel Stubbe	Independent	521	1.7		
Valid votes		31,133	98.3	24,484	99.4
Invalid votes		540	1.7	137	0.6
Total		31,673	100.0	24,621	100.0
Electorate/voter turnout		65,876	48.1	65,837	37.4
Source: City of Velbert (1st round, 2nd round)

=== City council ===
Results of the 2020 city council election

The Velbert city council governs the city alongside the Mayor. The most recent city council election was held on 13 September 2020, and the results were as follows:

Party	Votes	%	+/-	Seats	+/-
Christian Democratic Union (CDU)	9,471	30.4	▼4.2	21	±0
Alliance 90/The Greens (Grüne)	6,543	21.0	▲10.2	15	▲8
Social Democratic Party (SPD)	5,435	17.4	▼9.7	12	▼5
Independent Velbert Citizens (UVB)	2,343	7.5	▲2.2	5	▲2
Alternative for Germany (AfD)	1,998	6.4	New	4	New
Velbert Differently (Anders)	1,643	5.3	▼1.3	4	±0
Free Democratic Party (FDP)	1,392	4.5	▲0.4	3	±0
The Left (Die Linke)	1,174	3.8	▼1.6	3	±0
Pirate Party Germany (Piraten)	1,177	3.8	▲1.3	3	▲1
Independent	18	0.1	New	0	New
Valid votes	31,194	98.5			
Invalid votes	471	1.5			
Total	31,665	100.0		70	▲8
Electorate/voter turnout	65,875	48.1	▲1.1		
Source: City of Velbert

== Coat of arms ==
The first coat of arms was created in 1882 and abolished in local government reform of 1975. It showed the lion of the Counts, later Dukes, of Berg (originally the symbol of Limburg) and keys referring to locksmithing, a traditional industry in Velbert.

After 1975 a new coat of arms was created that included heraldic symbols for all three formerly independent towns. The key, referring to Velbert's main traditional industry, was retained with a simpler design. Langenberg is represented by an oak leaf, referring to the oak in the old arms of Langenberg. The chevrons in the bit of the key refer to the coat of arms of the lords of Hardenberg, from the coat of arms of Neviges.

== Economics ==
The main traditional industry of Velbert is small scale manufacturing, mostly metal based, typical products include locks, hinges, small tools, hoseclamps. Most companies are small to medium scale and many evolved from backyard forges. There are also companies producing parts for the automotive industry, for example the suppliers of vehicle access systems Witte Automotive and Huf. As well as this Stein & Co Gmbh, the makers of Sebo vacuum cleaners, are based in the city.

== Transportation ==
The autobahns serving Velbert are the Aachen-Kassel A 44 and the Velbert-Sonnborner Kreuz A 535.

Velbert's S-Bahn service runs every 30 minutes line S9, from Recklinghausen / Haltern am See–- Gladbeck to Bottrop– Essen-Nierenhof - Langenberg-Neviges - Rosenhügel-Wuppertal - Hagen, which is an attractive line to commuters though substantially to the east of the old town of Velbert, which has no railway connection left. The operational stations serving the city are Langenberg, Neviges, Nierenhof and Rosenhügel.

In 2011 most of the former railway line within the city was converted to a cyclepath. The former station buildings at Velbert-West and Velbert-Central are now restaurants, and the station at Velbert-Tönisheide is disused. All three were on the discontinued Niederberg Railway (Wülfrath-Velbert-Heiligenhaus–Kettwig).

Velbert also used to have a tram service, and was the meeting point of tramlines from Heidhausen, Neviges, Wülfrath and Hösel with Heiligenhaus. Nowadays a number of bus routes connect Velbert to the surrounding cities. The city belongs to the Verkehrsverbund Rhein-Ruhr.

== Twin towns – sister cities ==
Velbert is twinned with:

- Châtellerault, France (1965)
- Corby, England, United Kingdom (1966)
- Igoumenitsa, Greece (2012)
- Podujevë, Kosovo (2019)

=== Friendly cities ===
Velbert also has friendly relations with:

- Hacıbektaş, Turkey (2000)
- Morąg, Poland (2016)

== Sites of interest ==
=== Theatres ===
- The central theatre of the town is in Forum Niederberg.

=== Museums ===
The town's museum is also located in Forum Niederberg. It is the German museum for locks and metal fittings. The museum exhibits a broad variety of keys and locks.

=== Buildings ===
- Maria, Königin des Friedens, or Nevigeser Wallfahrtsdom, also known as Mariendom, in Neviges which was designed by the famous architect Gottfried Böhm
- Hardenberg Castle in Neviges
- Historical town centres in Neviges and Langenberg
- Event Church in Langenberg
- Bürgerhaus (Citizen's house) in Langenberg
- Transmission towers in Langenberg for MW, FM and TV (303.7 m and 170m high)
- City hall incl. Thomas-Carré in Velbert-Mitte
- The Art Nouveau church called Christuskirche (Christ Church) in Velbert-Mitte

== Notable people ==
- Lüder Lüers (1926–2022), German horticultural architect, engaged in founding Kindernothilfe
- Alexander Mies (born 1992), German racing driver
- Dieter Ramsauer (1939–2021), German engineer
- Walter Schlüter (1911–1977), German racing driver
