= Velbert-Nierenhof station =

Railway station in Velbert, Germany

Velbert Nierenhof
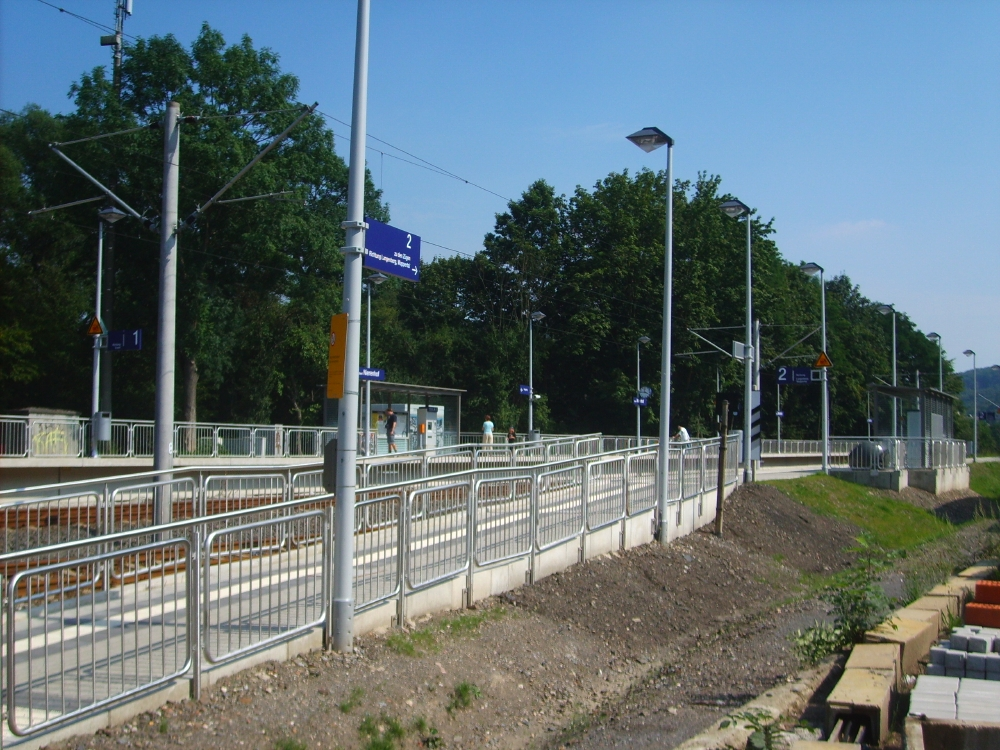

General information
- Location: Bonsfelderstr. 119, Velbert, NRW; Germany
- Coordinates: 51°22′21″N 7°08′03″E
- Owner: Deutsche Bahn
- Operator: DB Netz; DB Station&Service
- Lines: W-Vohwinkel–E-Überruhr (KBS 450.9)
- Platforms: 2

Construction
- Accessible: Yes

Other information
- Station code: 4550
- DS100 code: ENIR
- IBNR: 8004430
- Category: 6
- Fare zone: VRR: 552
- Website: www.bahnhof.de

History
- Opened: 1 December 1847

Services
Preceding station	Rhine-Ruhr S-Bahn	Following station
Essen-Kupferdreh towards Haltern am See or Recklinghausen Hbf	S9	Velbert-Langenberg towards Hagen Hbf
Location

Velbert-Nierenhof station is located in the city of Velbert in the German state of North Rhine-Westphalia. It is on the Wuppertal-Vohwinkel–Essen-Überruhr line and is served by S-Bahn line S 9.

== History ==
The area of Nierenhof station was the location of the terminus of the Deil Valley Coal Railway (Deilthaler Kohlenbahn), the line of the first German railway company (founded in 1828 by Friedrich Harkort and later renamed the Prince William Railway Company (Prinz-Wilhelm-Eisenbahn-Gesellschaft), which was laid next to the Deilbach from Nierenhof to Hinsbeck to serve the coal mines in the Deilbach valley, including the mine in Nierenhof. The 820 mm (2 ft 8 9/32 in) narrow-gauge railway with iron rails was to be steam-powered, which would have made it the first steam railway in Germany. Nevertheless, the concession issued by the district government did not initially allow steam operation, even though successful trial runs were carried out. After its opening by Prince Wilhelm of Prussia on 20 September 1831, the railway was initially operated as a horse-drawn tramway for freight, although occasional passenger services soon began. During its extension to Steele and Vohwinkel, which started in 1844 and was completed in 1847, the railway was converted to standard gauge and subsequently operated by steam. This involved converting the terminus at Nierenhof into a through station with its own signal box.

The station was the only station in the municipality of Niederbonsfeld, which was independent until 1926, and which included Nierenhof at the time. The Deilbach, which historically divided the Rhineland from Westphalia, flows through the town. The centre of the village of Eierhof was in Westphalia, but the station was on the western side of the river in Vossnacken in the Rhineland. In addition to a siding for general freight at the station, there was an industrial siding that ran for about 900 metres from the station to the west of the Deilbach, unlike the main line, to a brickworks. Tram line 17 of Bergischen Kleinbahn AG, which ran mostly parallel to the railway line between Wuppertal-Elberfeld and Essen-Steele, passed the station until the middle of the 20th century.

The station building, a slated two-storey half-timbered building with a pitched roof built in 1847, housed an apartment for staff on the upper floor and a waiting room, a staff room and a station restaurant on the ground floor. The building was demolished in 1972. The immediately adjacent signal box and crossing keeper's house was demolished in 1991. These buildings were replaced by a parking area.

== Location and layout ==
The station now only consists of two platforms, which are located next to a level crossing. Services on S-Bahn line S 9 run to Gladbeck, Bottrop, Essen, Wuppertal every 30 minutes and Recklinghausen, Haltern am See, Hagen every 60 minutes. The scheduled travel time is about 17 minutes (S 9) to Essen Hauptbahnhof and 29 minutes to Wuppertal Hauptbahnhof. There is a bus stop at the station, which is served by an Ortsbus Velbert bus route. In addition, the Velbert-Leberhof bus station, which is served by numerous regional bus routes connecting to the surrounding area, is 300 metres from the station.
