= Old Kupferdreh station =

Railway station in Essen, Germany

Coordinates: 51°23′37″N 7°4′44″E

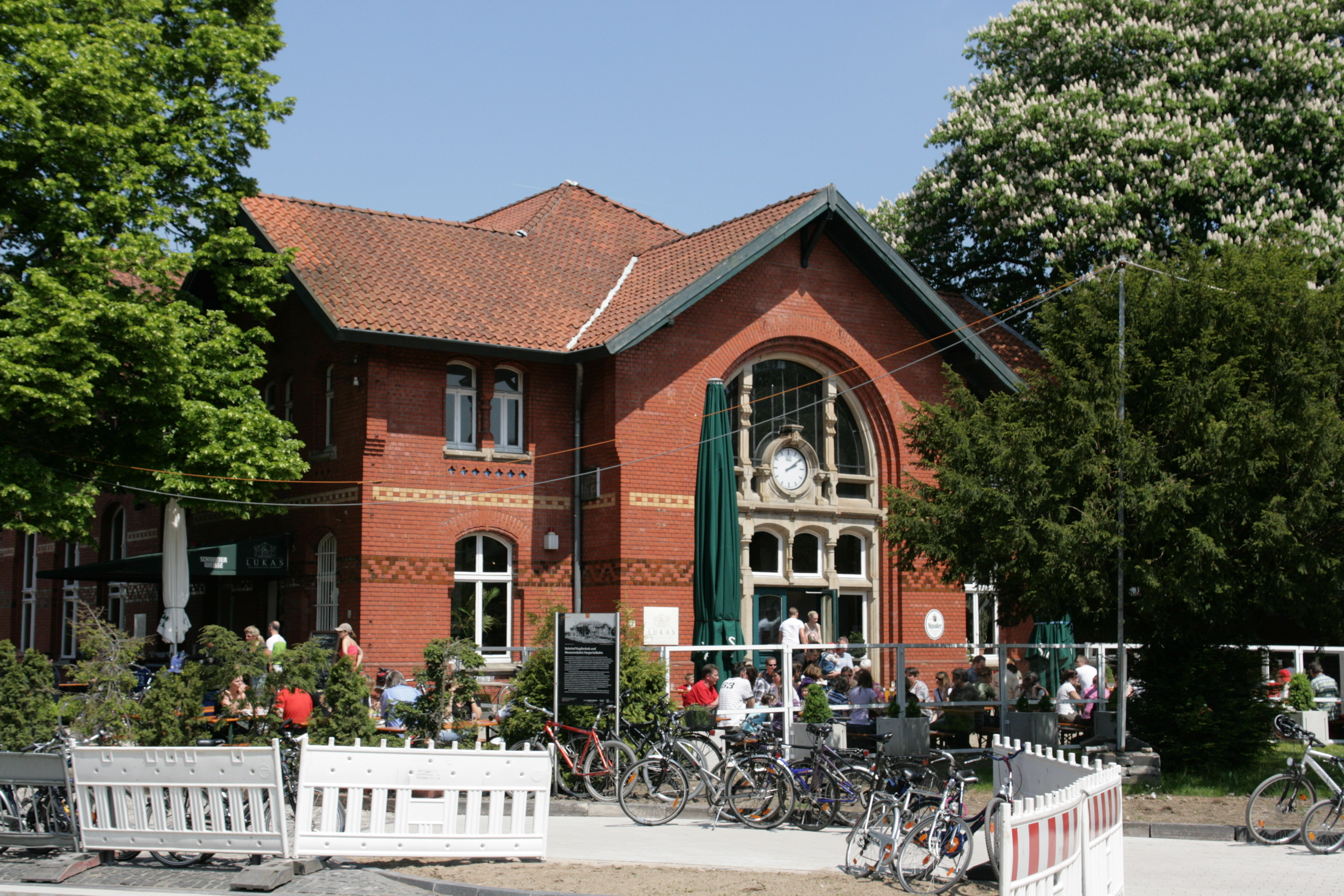
Old Kupferdreh station

Old Kupferdreh station (German: Alter Bahnhof Kupferdreh) was built by the Prussian state railways in the Essen district of Kupferdreh in the German state of North Rhine-Westphalia and opened in 1898 on the Prince William Railway. The station is close to the start of the first German railway, which was opened on 20 September 1831 by the Deil Valley Railway Company to Nierenhof.

The entrance building stands near the junction of the former Ruhr Valley Railway (Ruhrtalbahn) that ran from there along the north bank of the Ruhr and the Baldeneysee reservoir to Ruhrort. This building was opened on 27 July 1898. The station was designed in the form of a two-story brick house with decorative brick work, windows in different sizes and an arched entrance built with ochre sandstone. The stucco decoration in the first class waiting room, which was renovated for its current use as a large dining room, is notable.

The front platform, from which day the historic Hesper Valley Railway (Hespertalbahn) begins its journey, belonged formerly to the Ruhr Valley Railway, which crossed the Ruhr about 200 metres to the south. The Hesper Valley Railway or Pörtingsiepen Railway (Pörtingsiepenbahn) branched off and ran along the south bank of the Ruhr. A horse-hauled narrow-gauge railway was opened in the Hesper Valley in 1857, serving the mines in the Velbert area. The line was later connected to the Pörtingsiepen colliery in Essen-Fischlaken and as a result the line from Kupferdreh to Hesperbrück was converted to standard gauge in 1877. A remaining narrow gauge section to Hefel was closed in 1918. There were also passenger services for the mine workforce between 1927 and the closure of the Pörtingsiepen colliery in 1973. In 1975, the Association for the Preservation of Hesper Valley Railway (Verein zur Erhaltung der Hespertalbahn e. V.) rescued the line from demolition.

The trains of the line S 9 of the Rhine-Ruhr S-Bahn run past the old building without stopping to stop at the new Essen-Kupferdreh station.
