= Kindernothilfe =

Voluntary association

Kindernothilfe e. V.
- Established: 1959 (67 years ago)
- Types: nonprofit organization
- Focus: sustainable improvement of the living conditions of children in need and young people in poor countries of Africa, Asia, Latin America, and Eastern Europe
- Headquarters: Duisburg
- Country: Germany
- Area served: 36 countries
- Coordinates: 51.3763°N 6.7584°E
- Membership: 175
- Chairpersons: Katrin Weidemann (Chief Executive Officer), Carsten Montag (Chief Programme Officer)
- Revenue: 73,2 million (2024)
- Total Assets: 42.054.650,81 (2024)
- Employees: 206
- Volunteers: around 1.000
- Awards: DZI Seal-of-Approval
- Website: www.kindernothilfe.de/en

Kindernothilfe (German pronunciation: [ˈkɪndɐnoːtˌhɪlfə], lit. 'Children's Emergency Aid'; abbr. KNH) is a charity organization and was founded in 1959 by a group of Christians in Duisburg, Germany, in order to help children in need in India. Over time, it has become one of the largest Christian organizations in Europe for children's aid.

Today it supports more than 2.2 million children and young people in 36 countries in Africa, Asia, Latin America and Eastern Europe. KNH aims to give children in the poorest countries of the world a chance to a good start in life. That means a basic school education and vocational training, good nutrition and health care, as well as community-oriented support to the families of the children.

KNH works together with partner organizations located abroad, usually churches, congregations or Christian organizations. However, the support of children is always granted irrespective of religion.

The head office is in Duisburg. Here, staff members and volunteers coordinate the work abroad and carry out administrative, educational and lobby work as well as launch publicity campaigns.

== Finances ==
=== Donors ===
KNH is a registered charitable organization and a member of the Diaconic Services of the Evangelical Church in Germany. 73 percent of the work is financed through one-time or regular donations from 130 506 people who support Kindernothilfe. KNH heeds its Christian values and responsibilities as reflected in the life of Jesus.

=== Sponsorships ===
Child sponsorships support individual children until they become responsible for themselves.

A project sponsorship specifically provides targeted support for projects which strengthen children, their environment and an entire region.

=== Grants and subsidies ===
KNH receives subsidies from the German Federal Ministry for Economic Co-operation and Development (BMZ) and from the European Union as well as church grants: It also benefits from the payment of fines.

=== Seal of approval ===
Every year since 1992 Kindernothilfe has received the DZI seal of approval. This is awarded by the German Central Institute for Social Affairs (DZI) to charity organisations that uses the money received in a reliable, transparent and responsible manner.

== Foundation ==
Kindernothilfe started the Kindernothilfe Foundation in 1999. The chairmen of the foundation committee are Katrin Weidemann and Carsten Montag. The yields from the foundation capital of approx. 510 Thousand Euros flow directly into Kindernothilfe projects.

== Commitment ==
Kindernothilfe works on national and international levels by joining alliances, co-operating with networks and other organisations to achieve a global improvement of economic, social and political structural conditions. It participates in campaigns or initiates its own campaigns.

Kindernothilfe is above all committed to the implementation of the UN Convention on the Right of the Child which forms an important base for its work. At the beginning of 2004 Kindernothilfe was granted consultative status with the economic council and social council (ECOSOC) and this now enables it to draw more attention to the needs of children.

One of the founders of Kindernothilfe was Lüder Lüers.

== Alliances and campaigns ==
Kindernothilfe is a member of these alliances and campaigns:

- Verband Entwicklungspolitik deutscher Nichtregierungsorganisationen (VENRO)/Association for Development Policy of German Non-Government Organizations
- Ecpat
- Forum Kinderarbeit/German Anti Child-Labour Forum
- erlassjahr.de
- Deutscher Initiativkreis für das Verbot von Landminen
- TransFair
- International Coalition to stop the Use of Child Soldiers
- German National Coalition for the implementation of the UN-Convention on the Rights of the Child
- Action against AIDS Germany
- Werkstatt Ökonomie (Workshop Economy)
- Forum Menschenrechte (Forum Human Rights)
- Global campaign for Education
