= Dieter Ramsauer =

German inventor and businessman (1939–2021)

- Born: May 2, 1939; Velbert
- Died: April 23, 2021 (aged 81); Schwelm
- Occupations: engineer, founder, inventor

Dieter Ramsauer (2 May 1939 in Velbert – 23 April 2021 in Schwelm) was a German engineer who was the founder of the international operating company Dieter Ramsauer Konstruktionselemente GmbH (DIRAK), operating in the fields of development, production and the distribution of construction elements.

== Life ==
Ramsauer was the son of Franziska Ramsauer and toolmaker Hermann Ramsauer, and grew up in Velbert. He attended elementary school and completed an apprenticeship as a toolmaker after leaving school. This was followed by engineering studies at the Technisch-wissenschaftliche Fachlehranstalt (Tewifa) on Lake Constance.

Ramsauer initially worked as a design and sales engineer and set up his own engineering office in 1973. He designed components for a metalworking company for which he worked as a sales engineer. Whilst working for the company he developed numerous patents, which were then transferred to the company on the basis of a licensing agreement.

In 1991 he initially founded Dieter Ramsauer Konstruktionselemente GmbH (DIRAK) with 15 employees, but this now operates internationally including in the U.S., China, Singapore, India, the Middle East, and others. As the company continued to expand, Ramsauer built headquarters in Ennepetal-Oelkinghausen in 1998. The product range of the company, which is also represented at trade fairs, consists of approximately 4,500 catalogue items in the fields of closure, hinge, and connection technology.

== Inventions ==
Ramsauer developed a modular rotary latch, as well as a modular rod lock system.

This was followed by the development of the swing lever latch and by a new type of modular rod lock system that can be mounted outside the seal in the folding area of a control cabinet.

Ramsauer's DIRAK-SNAP-Technology (DST) enables simplification of assembly. This invention earned him a nomination for "Engineer of the Year" 2007 from the U.S. trade magazine Design News. DIRAK-SNAP-Technology also received the Product of the Year 2005 award from the trade magazine KEM Konstruktion.
