= Langenberg (Rhineland) =

- Borough of Velbert
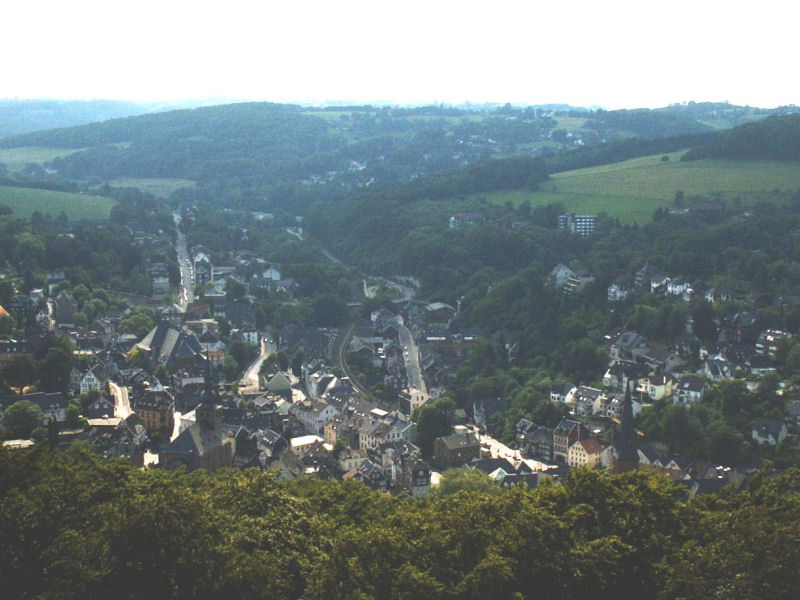
- view from the Bismarck tower over Langenberg

- Coat of arms
- Interactive map of Langenberg
- Location within Germany Location within North Rhine-Westphalia
- Coordinates: 51°21′07″N 07°07′18″E
- Country: Germany
- State: North Rhine-Westphalia
- Admin. region: Düsseldorf
- District: Mettmann
- Town: Velbert
- First mentioned: 1220
- Elevation: 149 m (489 ft)

Population (2021)
  - Total: 15,717
- Time zone: UTC+01:00 (CET)
  - Summer (DST): UTC+02:00 (CEST)
- Postal codes: 42555
- Dialling codes: 02052
- Vehicle registration: ME

Langenberg (German pronunciation: [ˈlaŋənbɛʁk]) is a borough (Stadtbezirk) of Velbert, a town in North Rhine-Westphalia, Germany. Its population is 15,717 (2021). Located in this district is the famous Sender Langenberg transmission site, which transmits MW, FM, and TV broadcasting signals.

== Gallery ==
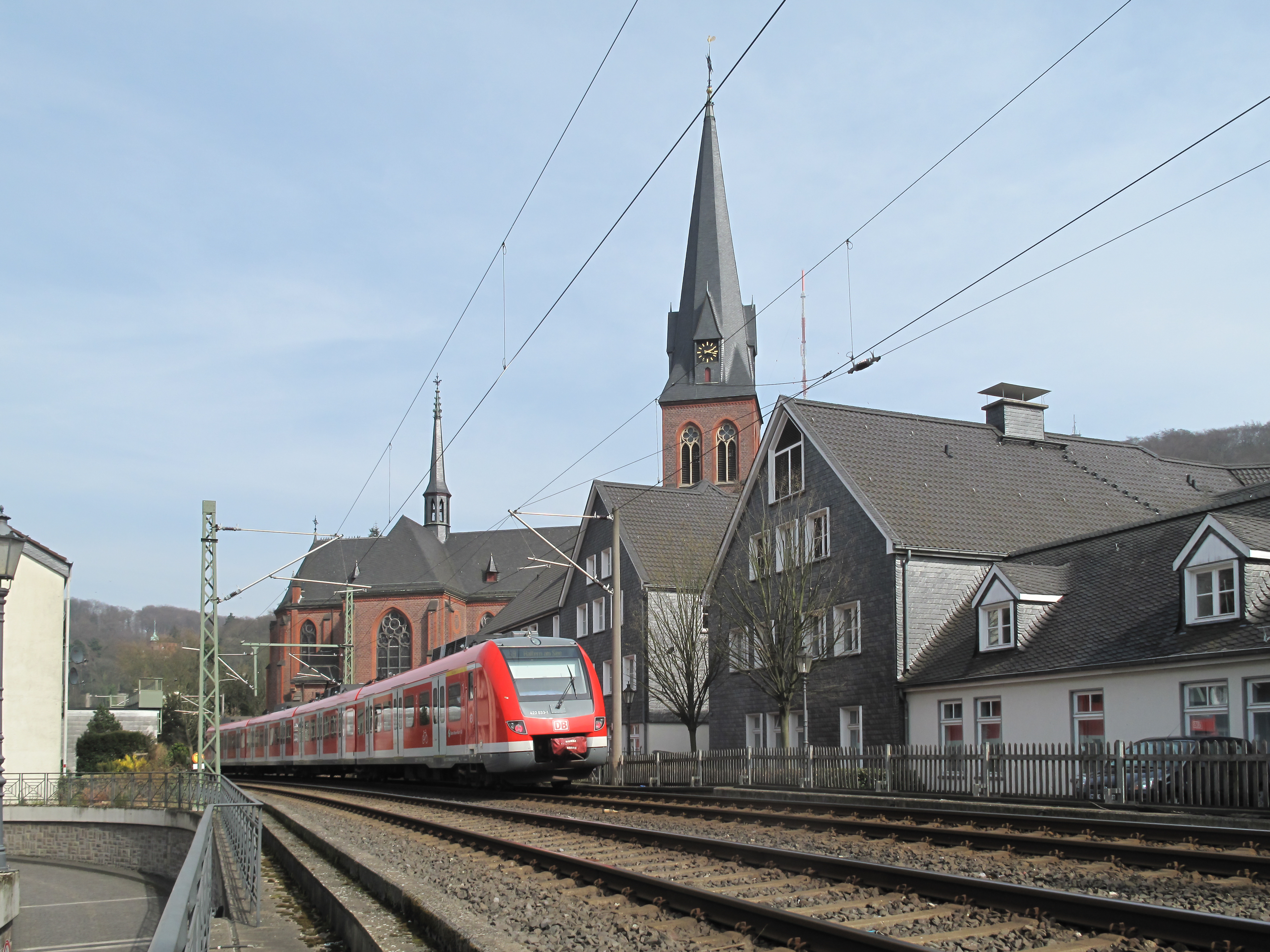
Langenberg, church (Sankt Michaelkirche) close to the railway

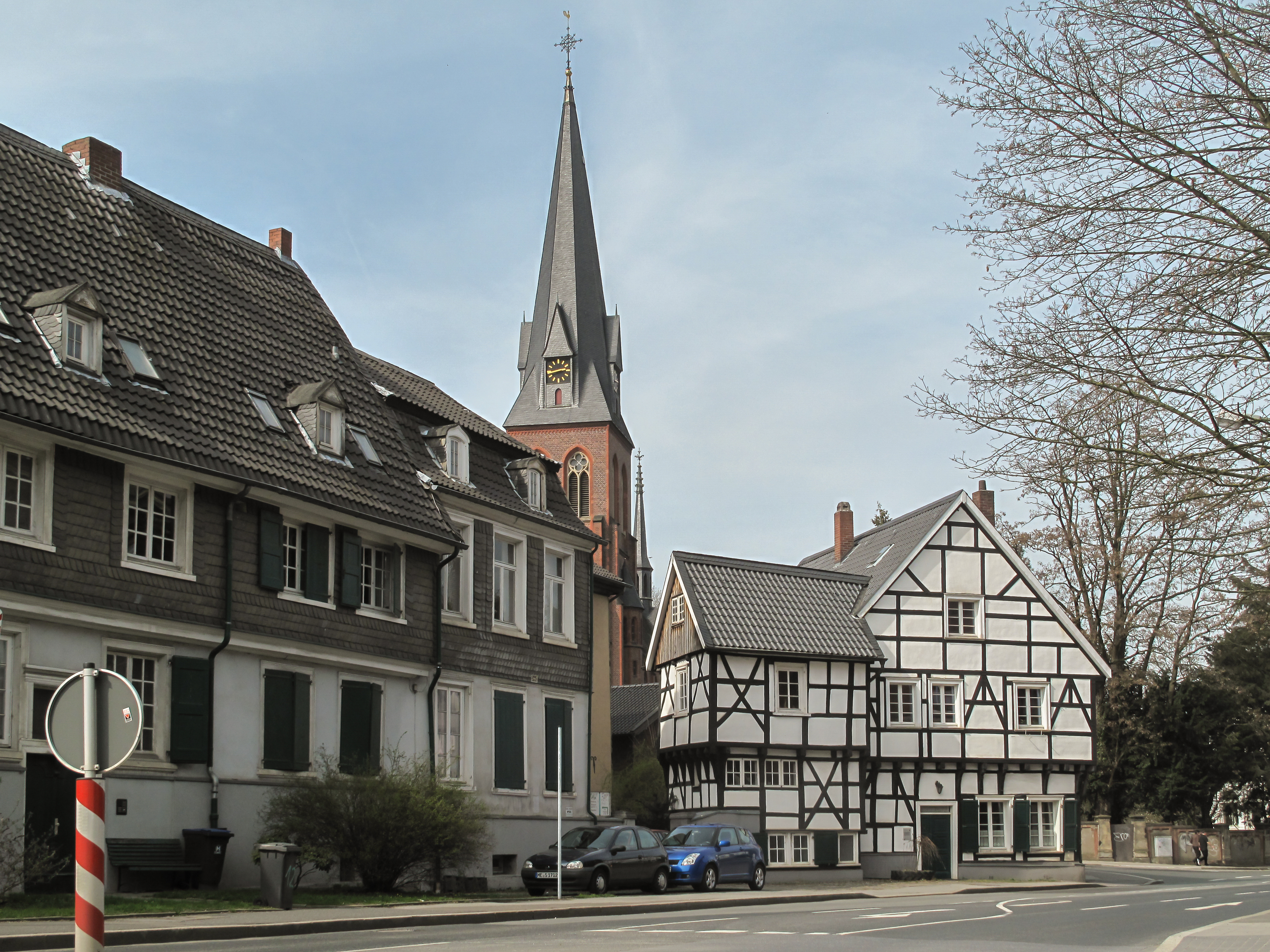
Langenberg, church (Sankt Michaelkirche) in the street

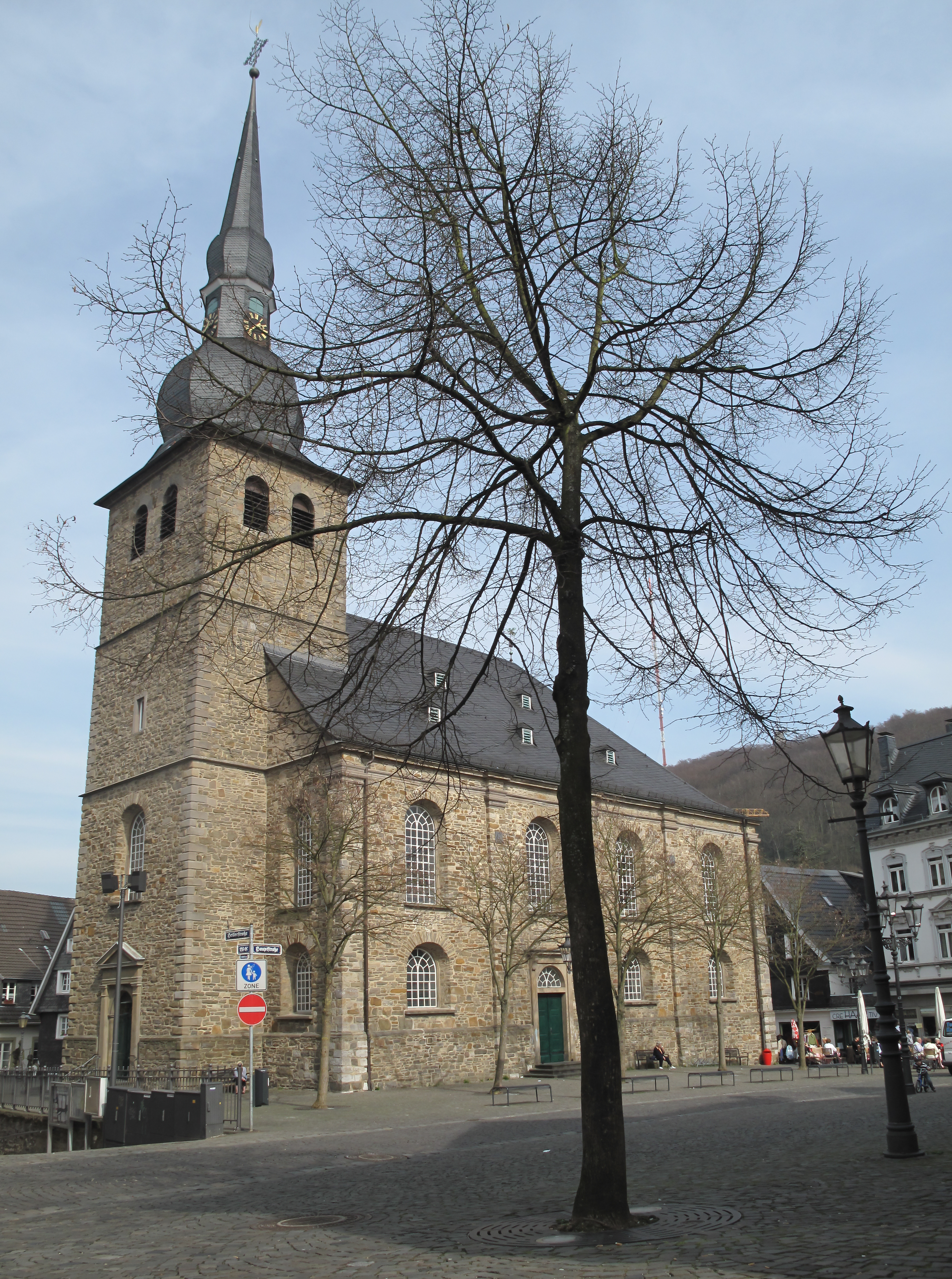
Langenberg, church: die Alte Kirche

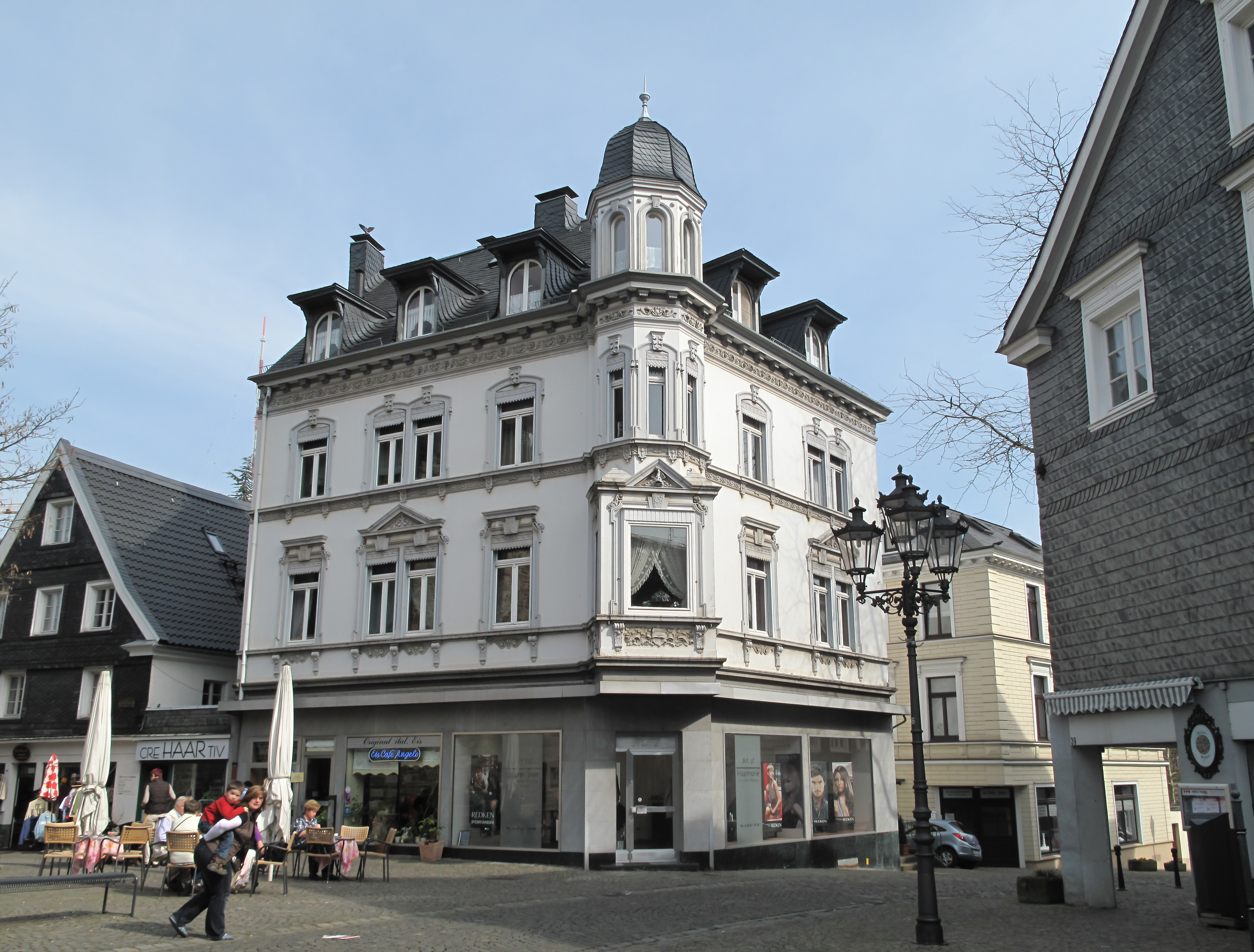
Langenberg, monumental building at the Hauptstrasse

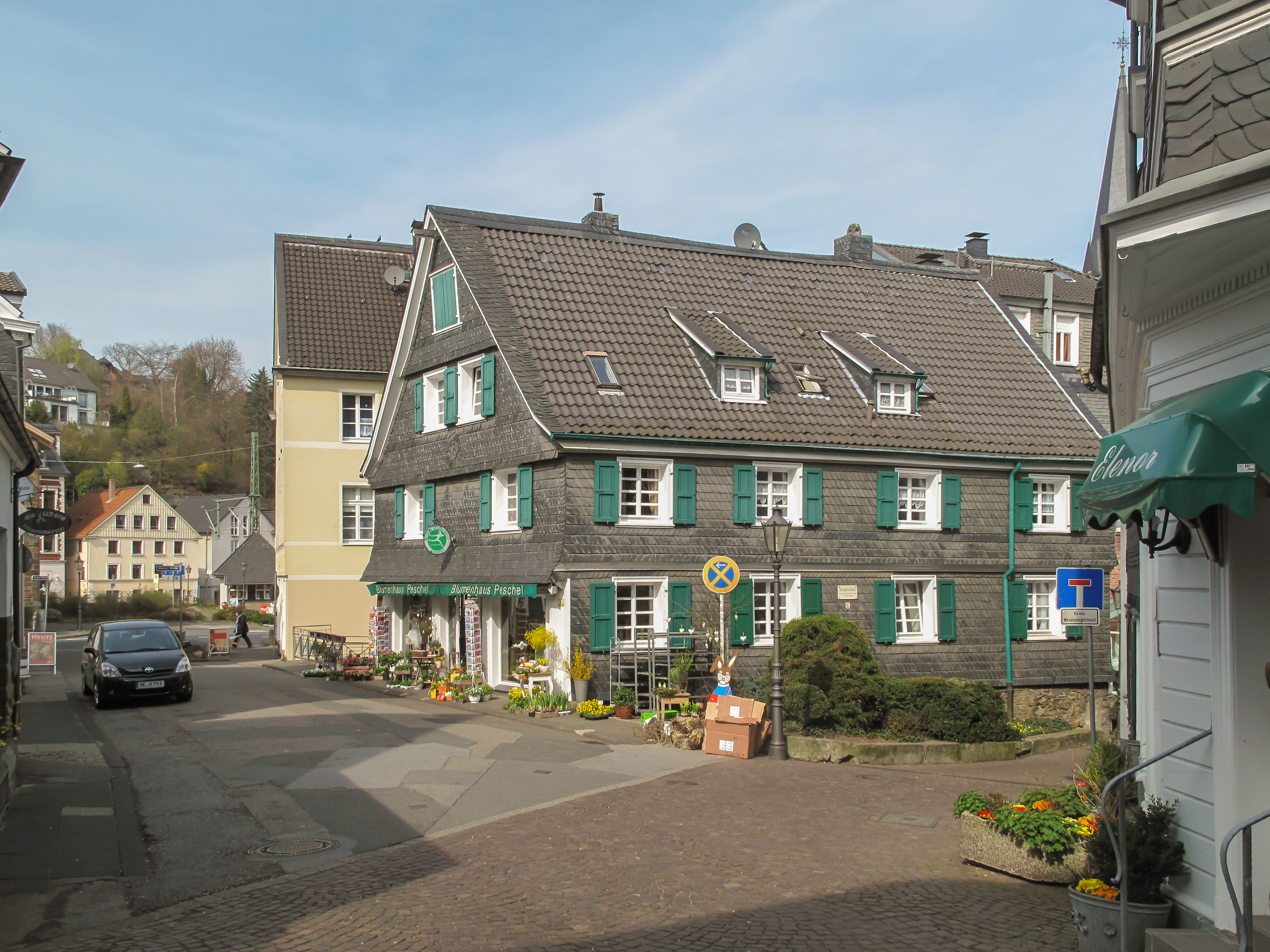
Langenberg, monumental house
