= Deilbach =

River in North Rhine-Westphalia, Germany

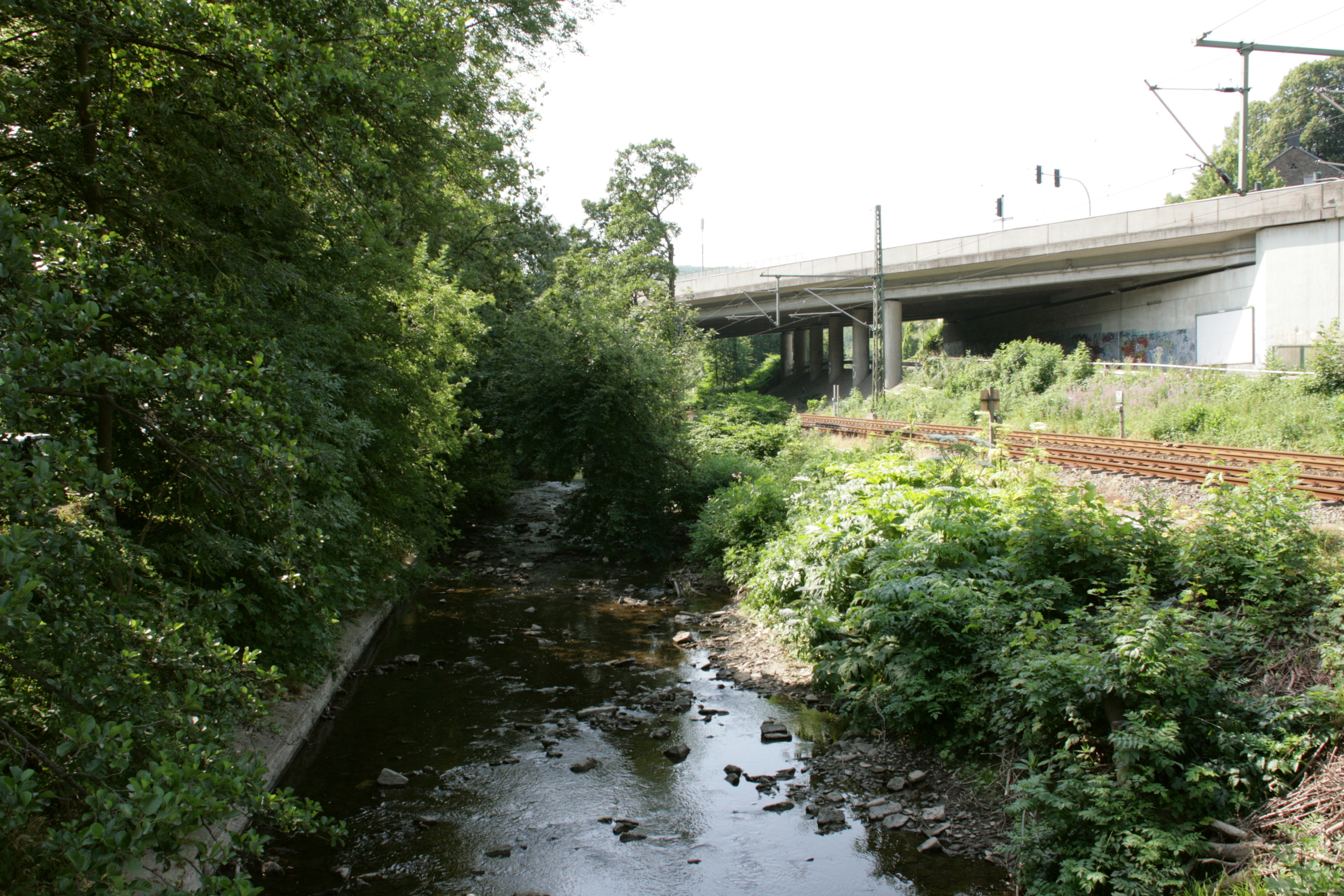
- The Deilbach passing through Essen

Location
- Country: Germany
- State: North Rhine-Westphalia

Physical characteristics
- Mouth
  - location: Ruhr
  - coordinates: 51.38°N 7.08°E
- Length: 20.8 km (12.9 mi)

Basin features
- Progression: Ruhr→ Rhine→ North Sea

Deilbach is a river of North Rhine-Westphalia, Germany. It flows into the Ruhr in Essen-Kupferdreh.

== See also ==
- List of rivers of North Rhine-Westphalia
