= Wuppertal-Vohwinkel–Essen-Überruhr railway =

Railway line

Coordinates: 51.2341°N 7.0718°E

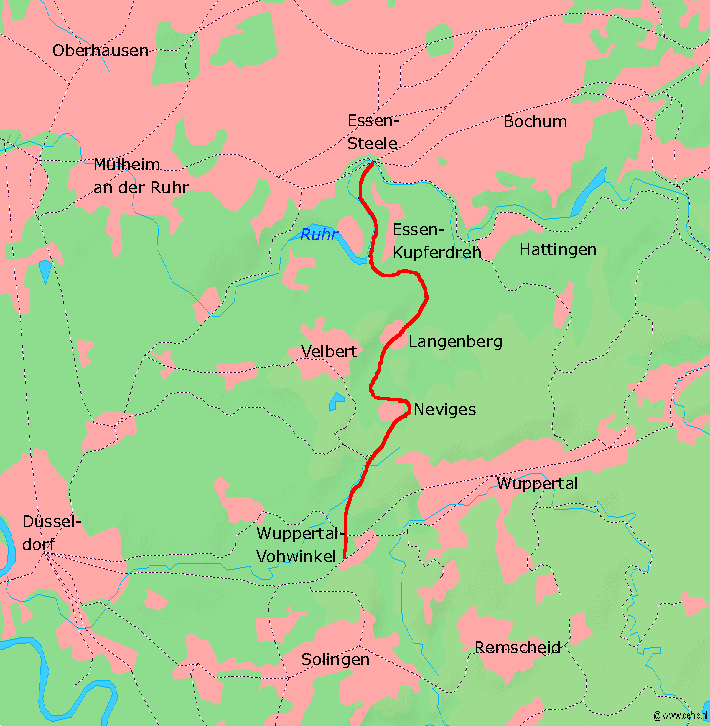

Overview
- Line number: 2723 (W-Vohwinkel ↔ E-Kupferdreh); 2400 (E-Kupferdreh ↔ E-Überruhr)
- Locale: North Rhine-Westphalia, Germany

Service
- Route number: 450.9

Technical
- Line length: 30 km (19 mi)
- Track gauge: 1,435 mm (4 ft 8 1/2 in) standard gauge
- Electrification: 15 kV/16.7 Hz AC overhead catenary
- Operating speed: 120 km/h (74.6 mph) (maximum)

The Wuppertal-Vohwinkel-Essen Überruhr Railway is a 30 km (19 mi) long, continuous two-track electrified main line. It is known as the Prince William Railway, the first railway linking the valleys of the Wupper and the Ruhr.

The first line on the route was opened in 1831 by the Deil Valley Railway Company (German: Deilthaler Eisenbahn Aktiengesellschaft) along the Deilbach Valley and was the first railway in Germany, although horse-hauled until its conversion to standard gauge in 1847.

== Construction of the line ==
=== Deil Valley Railway Company/Prince William Railway Company ===
On 21 June 1844 the Prince William Railway Company (German: Prinz-Wilhelm-Eisenbahn-Gesellschaft, PWE) had received the concession for the rebuilding of its existing line between Nierenhof (near Langenberg, now part of Velbert) and Hinsbek (a suburb of Kupferdreh, now part of Essen). The line was converted from narrow gauge (820 mm (2 ft 8 9/32 in)) to standard gauge (1,435 mm (4 ft 8 1/2 in)) and extended in the south to Vohwinkel and in the north to Überruhr and opened for passenger operations on 1 December 1847.

=== Bergisch-Märkische Railway Company ===
The Bergisch-Märkische Railway Company (German: Bergisch-Märkische Eisenbahn-Gesellschaft, BME) took over operation of the route on 27 March 1854 and on 1 January 1863 it acquired the Prince William Railway Company and its line. It extended the line in a north-easterly direction to Steele (later Steele Hauptbahnhof, now Essen-Steele Ost station, connecting to a section of its Witten/Dortmund–Oberhausen/Duisburg line opened in March 1862) and from there along the Ruhr through Dahlhausen and on to Langendreer BME. The Essen-Überruhr–Bochum-Langendreer line was opened five months later on 1 June 1863.

=== Terminal station ===
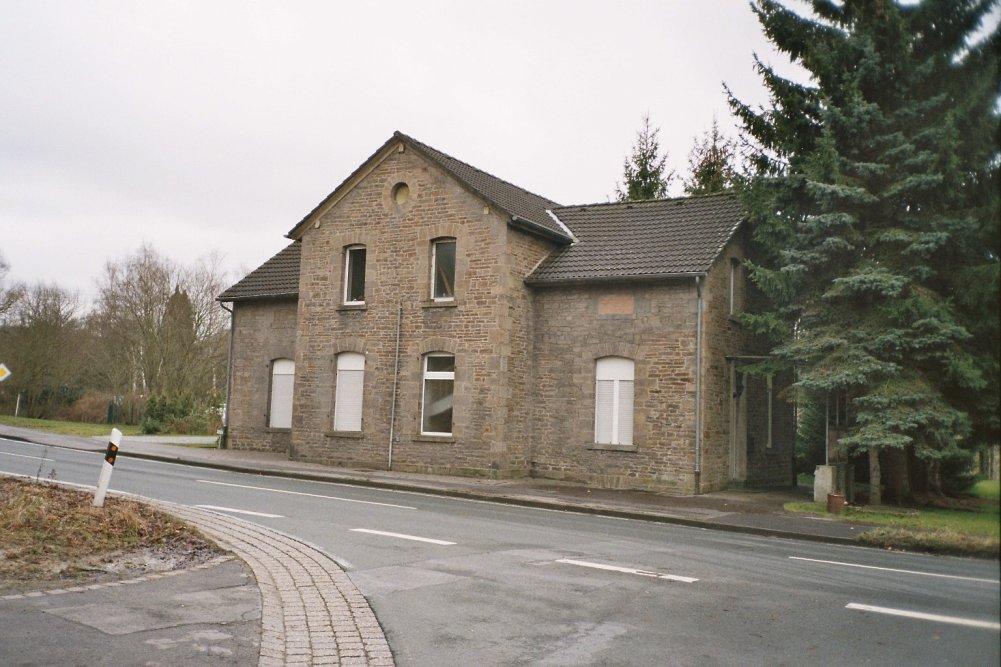
Former terminal station

Since the extension of the line in 1847 trains had to reverse in the terminal station (German: Kopfstation, literally "head station") in the Siebeneick Valley to continue their journey. This need was overcome in 1868 with the realignment of the track and the closure of the station.

=== Ruhr Valley Railway ===
On 1 February 1872 the first part of the BME's Ruhr Valley Railway was opened from Düsseldorf-Oberbilk to Essen-Kupferdreh, and in 1874 another section of it from Essen-Überruhr to Hagen-Vorhalle (connecting with the Elberfeld–Dortmund line).

Both routes now no longer connect with the Prince William line, the sections from Essen-Kupferdreh to Essen-Werden and Essen-Überruhr via Altendorf (now Essen-Burgaltendorf) to Bochum-Dahlhausen are now closed and partially dismantled.

== Current situation ==
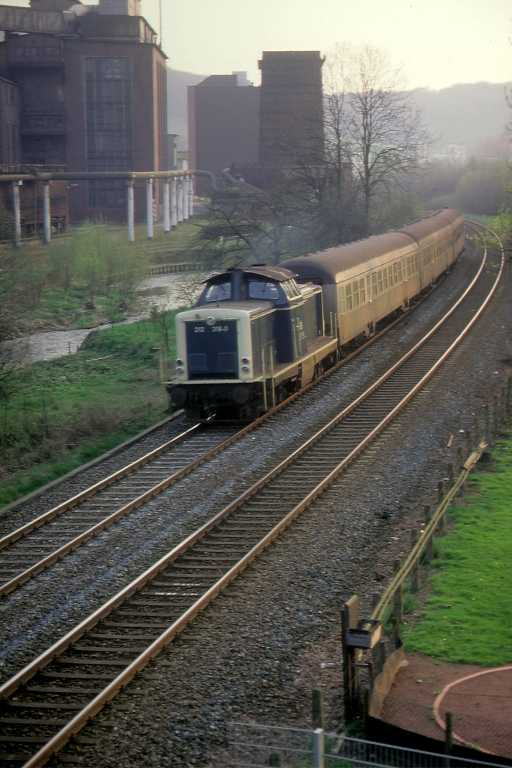
N9 local service between Kupferdreh and Nierenhof in 1986 prior to the electrification of the line

In the 1970s work began on developing the main lines in the central Ruhr area for the Rhine-Ruhr S-Bahn. On 1 February 1978 a direct connection was opened for the first time from Essen-Überruhr to Essen-Steele (then Essen-Steele West), while the line between Essen-Überruhr and Essen-Steele Ost was closed. The new connecting curve is a single-track line like the old line.

This work allowed a new through service. Instead of going to Essen-Steele Ost and further east, trains from Wuppertal-Vohwinkel could continue to Essen Hauptbahnhof. The section from Essen-Steele Ost to Bochum- Dahlhausen West junction had already been incorporated (on 26 May 1974) into S-Bahn line S3.

The Wuppertal-Vohwinkel-Essen Überruhr line was upgraded for its inclusion in the S-Bahn on 15 December 2003 and electrified for its whole length. Velbert-Rosenhügel station was rebuilt and Velbert-Neviges station was relocated. In addition, the Aprath station closed in 1965 was reopened as Wülfrath-Aprath station. The old platforms of Domap station, which was closed in May 1965, were also demolished.

S-Bahn line S9 runs every 30 minutes from Wuppertal to Wuppertal-Vohwinkel, Velbert, Essen-Überruhr, Essen-Steele, Essen Hbf, Essen-Borbeck, Bottrop and Gladbeck. Once an hour S-Bahn trains continue to Recklinghausen, Haltern am See and Hagen.
