= S9 (Rhine-Ruhr S-Bahn) =

Railway service of the Rhine-Ruhr S-Bahn network

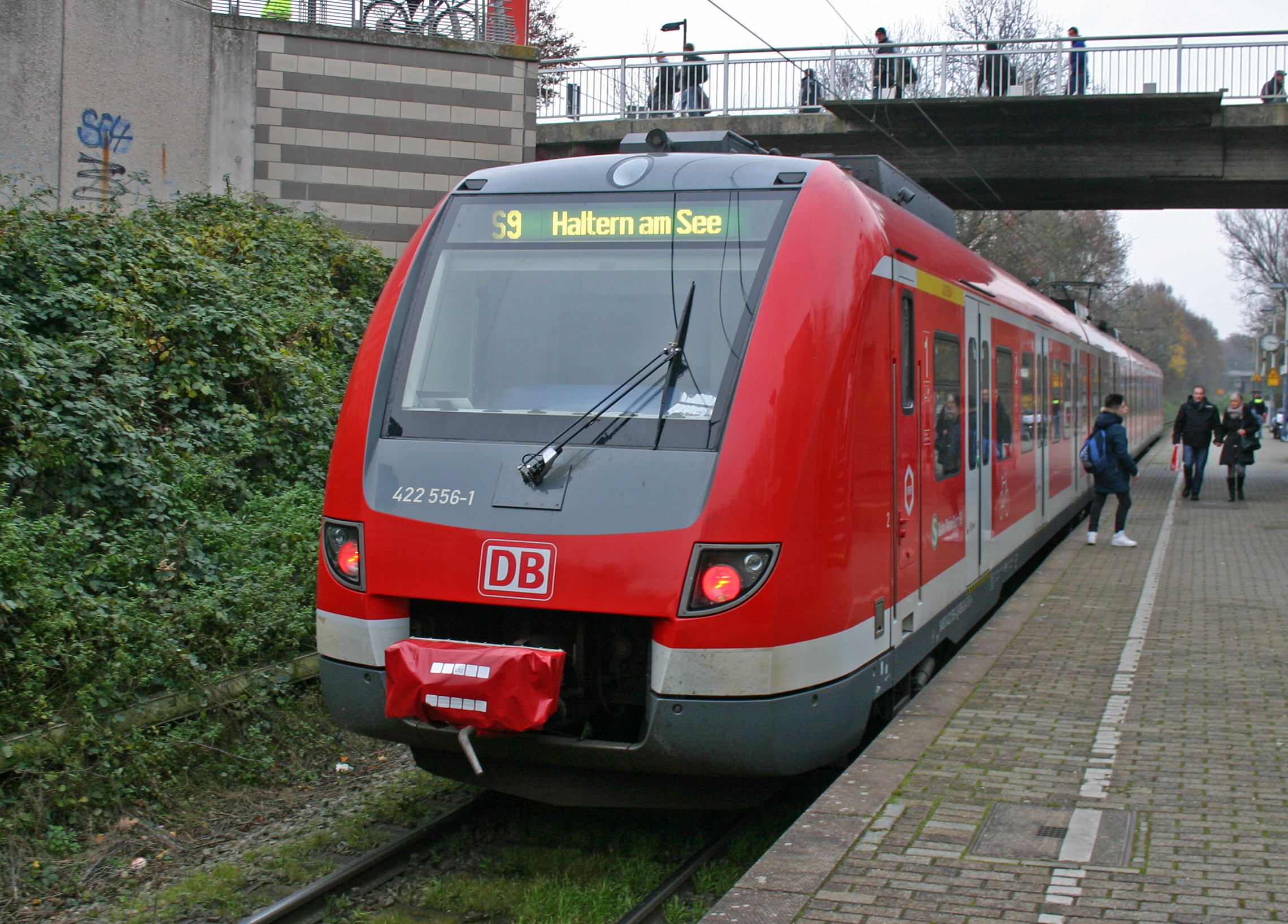

Overview
- Termini: Recklinghausen Hauptbahnhof/Haltern am See station; Hagen Hauptbahnhof
- Stations: 43
- Website: https://www.abellio.de/de/abellio-nordrhein-westfalen/linien-netze/s-bahn-rhein-ruhr/linienuebersicht/s9

Service
- Operator(s): DB Regio NRW
- Rolling stock: Stadler FLIRT 3 XL

Technical
- Line length: 153 km (95 mi)
- Track gauge: 1,435 mm (4 ft 8 1/2 in) standard gauge

Line S 9 is an S-Bahn line on the Rhine-Ruhr network, operated by DB Regio. It runs from Recklinghausen Hbf / Haltern am See in the north through Gladbeck West - Essen Hbf to Hagen (Westphalia) Main Station in the south. During the day two services per hour run between Wuppertal and Gladbeck West, one service per hour between Gladbeck and Recklinghausen Hbf and Gladbeck and Haltern am See and one service per hour between Wuppertal and Hagen, using FLIRT 3XL electric multiple units.

Line S 9 runs over lines built by various railway companies:

- Line branch 1 from Recklinghausen Hbf (Wanne-Eickel-Hamburg railway) - to Abzwg Blumenthal (Oberhausen-Osterfeld Süd-Hamm railway), opened by Prussian state railways on 1 May 1905, direction Gladbeck West (separation station)
- Line branch 2 from Haltern am See to Marl Lippe junction over the Wanne-Eickel–Hamburg railway opened by the Cologne-Minden Railway Company on 1 January 1870, from Marl Lippe junction to Gelsenkirchen-Buer Nord over the Gelsenkirchen-Buer Nord–Marl Lippe railway opened by Deutsche Bundesbahn on 27 September 1968
- from Gelsenkirchen-Buer Nord to Gladbeck West (separation station) and Bottrop over the Oberhausen-Osterfeld Süd–Hamm railway,
- from Bottrop to Essen-Dellwig Ost over line 2248 opened by Deutsche Bundesbahn on 18 May 1952,
- from Essen-Dellwig Ost to Schönebeck junction (near Essen-Borbeck Süd) over the Mülheim-Heißen–Oberhausen-Osterfeld Nord railway opened by the Rhenish Railway Company on 1 December 1872,
- from Schönebeck junction to Essen West over a section of line opened by Prussian state railways on 25 March 1912,
- from Schönebeck junction to Essen West to Essen-Steele over the Witten/Dortmund–Oberhausen/Duisburg railway opened by the Bergisch-Märkische Railway Company on 1 March 1862
- from Essen-Steele to Essen-Steele Ost junction (Ruhr Bridge part) over line 2193 opened by Deutsche Bundesbahn on 1 February 1978
- from Essen-Steele Ost junction to Essen-Überruhr over the Essen-Überruhr–Bochum-Langendreer railway, converted to standard gauge on 1 June 1863 (although parts of the line dated back to 1811 as a horse-hauled colliery plateway) and acquired by the Bergisch-Märkische Railway Company in 1870,
- from Überruhr to Kupferdreh over a section of the Wuppertal-Vohwinkel–Essen-Überruhr line opened by the Prince William Railway Company on 1 December 1847,
- from Kupferdreh to Nierenhof over a section of the Wuppertal-Vohwinkel–Essen-Überruhr line opened by the Deil Valley Railway Company as a 820 mm gauge, horse-hauled railway on 20 September 1831 (it is regarded as Germany's oldest railway, because it used iron wheels on iron rails); this was standardised by the Prince William Railway Company in 1847,
- from Nierenhof to Vohwinkel over a section of the Wuppertal-Vohwinkel–Essen-Überruhr line opened by the Prince William Railway Company in 1847, except for a section from near Velbert-Neviges to near Velbert-Rosenhügel, which was opened in 1868 by the Bergisch-Märkische Railway Company,
- from Vohwinkel to Wuppertal-Steinbeck over the Düsseldorf–Elberfeld railway opened by the Düsseldorf-Elberfeld Railway Company on 3 September 1841,
- from Steinbeck to Wuppertal Hauptbahnhof over a link line opened by the Düsseldorf-Elberfeld Railway and the Bergisch-Märkische Railway on 28 December 1848,
- from Wuppertal to Schwelm over the Elberfeld–Dortmund railway built by the Bergisch-Märkische Railway Company between 1847 and 1849,
- a short section of the Witten–Schwelm railway from Schwelm towards Gevelsberg West opened by Deutsche Reichsbahn in 1934, and
- from Gevelsberg West to Hagen over the Düsseldorf-Derendorf–Dortmund Süd railway, built by the Rhenish Railway Company between 1873 and 1879 (except for a section between Hagen-Heubing and Hagen Hauptbahnhof built in 1894 by the Prussian state railways).

S-Bahn services commenced between Dortmund and Essen on 29 September 1991. Services commenced between Steele Ost and Haltern am See on 24 May 1998. Services were extended to Wuppertal on 14 December 2003 and to Hagen on 1 May 2020 and to Recklinghausen on 11 Sept 2020. Services to Herten commenced on 11 December 2022. Services to Herten-Westerhold commenced on 14 December 2025.
