= Ennepe-Ruhr-Kreis II =

Federal electoral district of Germany

138 Ennepe-Ruhr-Kreis II
- Electoral district for the Bundestag
- Ennepe-Ruhr-Kreis II in 2025
- State: North Rhine-Westphalia
- Population: 225,800 (2019)
- Electorate: 175,283 (2021)
- Major settlements: Witten; Hattingen; Wetter (Ruhr)
- Area: 245.9 km^{2}

Current electoral district
- Created: 1949
- Party: CDU
- Member: Katja Strauss-Köster
- Elected: 2025

Ennepe-Ruhr-Kreis II is an electoral constituency (German: Wahlkreis) represented in the Bundestag. It elects one member via first-past-the-post voting. Under the current constituency numbering system, it is designated as constituency 138. It is located in the Ruhr region of North Rhine-Westphalia, comprising the northern part of the Ennepe-Ruhr-Kreis district.

Ennepe-Ruhr-Kreis II was created for the inaugural 1949 federal election. From 2021 to 2025, it has been represented by Axel Echeverria of the Social Democratic Party (SPD). Since 2025 it has been represented by Katja Strauss-Köster of the CDU.

== Geography ==
Ennepe-Ruhr-Kreis II is located in the Ruhr region of North Rhine-Westphalia. As of the 2021 federal election, it comprises the municipalities of Hattingen, Herdecke, Sprockhövel, Wetter (Ruhr), and Witten from the Ennepe-Ruhr-Kreis district.

== History ==
Ennepe-Ruhr-Kreis II was created in 1949, then known as Ennepe-Ruhr – Witten. From 1965 through 1976, it was named Ennepe-Ruhr-Kreis. From 1980 through 1998, it was named Ennepe-Ruhr-Kreis I. It acquired its current name in the 2002 election. In the 1949 election, it was North Rhine-Westphalia constituency 54 in the numbering system. From 1953 through 1961, it was number 113. From 1965 through 1976, it was number 112. From 1980 through 1998, it was number 109. From 2002 through 2009, it was number 140. In the 2013 through 2021 elections, it was number 139. From the 2025 election, it has been number 138.

Originally, the constituency comprised the Ennepe-Ruhr-Kreis district and the independent city of Witten. From 1965 through 1976, it was coterminous with the Ennepe-Ruhr-Kreis district. From 1980 through 1998, it comprised the entirety of the Ennepe-Ruhr-Kreis district excluding Witten. It acquired its current borders in the 2002 election.

Election	No.	Name	Borders
1949	54	Ennepe-Ruhr – Witten	Ennepe-Ruhr-Kreis district; Witten city
1953	113	Ennepe-Ruhr – Witten	Ennepe-Ruhr-Kreis district; Witten city
1957	113	Ennepe-Ruhr – Witten	Ennepe-Ruhr-Kreis district; Witten city
1961	113	Ennepe-Ruhr – Witten	Ennepe-Ruhr-Kreis district; Witten city
1965	112	Ennepe-Ruhr-Kreis	Ennepe-Ruhr-Kreis district
1969	112	Ennepe-Ruhr-Kreis	Ennepe-Ruhr-Kreis district
1972	112	Ennepe-Ruhr-Kreis	Ennepe-Ruhr-Kreis district
1976	112	Ennepe-Ruhr-Kreis	Ennepe-Ruhr-Kreis district
1980	109	Ennepe-Ruhr-Kreis I	Ennepe-Ruhr-Kreis district (excluding Witten municipality)
1983	109	Ennepe-Ruhr-Kreis I	Ennepe-Ruhr-Kreis district (excluding Witten municipality)
1987	109	Ennepe-Ruhr-Kreis I	Ennepe-Ruhr-Kreis district (excluding Witten municipality)
1990	109	Ennepe-Ruhr-Kreis I	Ennepe-Ruhr-Kreis district (excluding Witten municipality)
1994	109	Ennepe-Ruhr-Kreis I	Ennepe-Ruhr-Kreis district (excluding Witten municipality)
1998	109	Ennepe-Ruhr-Kreis I	Ennepe-Ruhr-Kreis district (excluding Witten municipality)
2002	140	Ennepe-Ruhr-Kreis II	Ennepe-Ruhr-Kreis district (only Hattingen, Herdecke, Sprockhövel, Wetter (Ruhr), and Witten municipalities)
2005	140	Ennepe-Ruhr-Kreis II	Ennepe-Ruhr-Kreis district (only Hattingen, Herdecke, Sprockhövel, Wetter (Ruhr), and Witten municipalities)
2009	140	Ennepe-Ruhr-Kreis II	Ennepe-Ruhr-Kreis district (only Hattingen, Herdecke, Sprockhövel, Wetter (Ruhr), and Witten municipalities)
2013	139	Ennepe-Ruhr-Kreis II	Ennepe-Ruhr-Kreis district (only Hattingen, Herdecke, Sprockhövel, Wetter (Ruhr), and Witten municipalities)
2017	139	Ennepe-Ruhr-Kreis II	Ennepe-Ruhr-Kreis district (only Hattingen, Herdecke, Sprockhövel, Wetter (Ruhr), and Witten municipalities)
2021	139	Ennepe-Ruhr-Kreis II	Ennepe-Ruhr-Kreis district (only Hattingen, Herdecke, Sprockhövel, Wetter (Ruhr), and Witten municipalities)
2025	138	Ennepe-Ruhr-Kreis II	Ennepe-Ruhr-Kreis district (only Hattingen, Herdecke, Sprockhövel, Wetter (Ruhr), and Witten municipalities)

== Members ==
The constituency has been held continuously by the Social Democratic Party (SPD) since its creation. It was first represented by Walter Freitag 1949 to 1953, followed by Heinrich Sträter until 1961. Wilhelm Michels was elected in 1961 and served until 1972. He was succeeded by Hans-Jürgen Augstein, who served two terms. Eugen von der Wiesche was then representative from 1980 to 1990. Adolf Ostertag served until 2002, followed by Christel Humme from 2002 to 2013. Ralf Kapschack was elected in 2013 and re-elected in 2017. He was succeeded by Axel Echeverria in 2021. In 2025, after 76 years of SPD representation, Katja Strauss-Köster of the CDU was elected.

Election	Member	Party	%
1949	Walter Freitag	SPD	40.5
1953	Heinrich Sträter	SPD	43.1
1957	Heinrich Sträter	SPD	46.2
1961	Wilhelm Michels	SPD	49.4
1965	Wilhelm Michels	SPD	53.2
1969	Wilhelm Michels	SPD	56.0
1972	Hans-Jürgen Augstein	SPD	59.8
1976	Hans-Jürgen Augstein	SPD	54.7
1980	Eugen von der Wiesche	SPD	54.0
1983	Eugen von der Wiesche	SPD	50.4
1987	Eugen von der Wiesche	SPD	50.8
1990	Adolf Ostertag	SPD	48.5
1994	Adolf Ostertag	SPD	52.1
1998	Adolf Ostertag	SPD	57.1
2002	Christel Humme	SPD	55.7
2005	Christel Humme	SPD	52.4
2009	Christel Humme	SPD	40.9
2013	Ralf Kapschack	SPD	42.3
2017	Ralf Kapschack	SPD	36.7
2021	Axel Echeverria	SPD	35.4
2025	Katja Strauss-Köster	CDU	30.9

== Election results ==
=== 2025 election ===
Federal election (2025): Ennepe-Ruhr-Kreis II
Notes:	Blue background denotes the winner of the electorate vote. Pink background denotes a candidate elected from their party list. Yellow background denotes an electorate win by a list member, or other incumbent. A ✓ or ✗ denotes status of any incumbent, win or lose respectively.						
Party	Candidate	Votes	%	±%	Party votes	%	±%
CDU	Katja Strauss-Köster	43,774	30.9	▲6.3	38,804	27.3	▲5.3
SPD	✗ Axel Echeverria	42,576	30.1	▼5.4	33,730	23.7	▼9.9
AfD	Heike Bandmann	23,490	16.6	▲9.4	23,813	16.8	▲9.7
Greens	Janosch Dahmen	14,587	10.3	▼5.7	17,813	12.5	▼3.6
Left	Ursula Weiß	8,617	6.1	▲3.3	10,659	7.5	▲3.8
BSW					5,687	4.0	
FDP	Anna Neumann	4,263	3.0	▼5.5	5,787	4.1	▼6.6
PARTEI	Matthias Scholz	2,127	1.5	▼0.4	949	0.7	▼0.5
Tierschutzpartei					2,080	1.5	▼0.1
FW	Daniel Jakoby	1,405	1.0	▼0.1	673	0.5	▼0.1
Volt					779	0.5	▲0.3
BD	Anders Arendt	583	0.4		242	0.2	
dieBasis				▼1.3	312	0.2	▼0.9
MLPD	Achim Czylwick	256	0.2	0.0	120	0.1	0.0
PdF					250	0.2	▲0.1
Team Todenhöfer					236	0.2	▼0.3
Values					66	0.0	
MERA25					41	0.0	
Pirates				▼1.1			▼0.6
Gesundheitsforschung							▼0.1
ÖDP							▼0.1
Bündnis C							▼0.1
Humanists							▼0.1
SGP							0.0
Informal votes		1,182			819		
Total valid votes		141,678			142,041		
Turnout		142,860	83.6	▲5.6			
CDU gain from SPD	Majority	1,198	0.8	▲5.0			

=== 2021 election ===
Federal election (2021): Ennepe-Ruhr-Kreis II
Notes:	Blue background denotes the winner of the electorate vote. Pink background denotes a candidate elected from their party list. Yellow background denotes an electorate win by a list member, or other incumbent. A ✓ or ✗ denotes status of any incumbent, win or lose respectively.						
Party	Candidate	Votes	%	±%	Party votes	%	±%
SPD	Axel Echeverria	47,993	35.4	▼1.3	45,664	33.7	▲3.8
CDU	Hartmut Ziebs	33,357	24.6	▼8.3	29,855	22.0	▼5.3
Greens	Ina Gießwein	21,734	16.0	▲7.5	21,941	16.2	▲8.0
FDP	Anna Neumann	11,530	8.5	▼2.0	14,432	10.6	▼2.0
AfD	Carl-Dietrich Korte	9,731	7.2		9,654	7.1	▼2.6
Left	Clemens Jost	3,715	2.7	▼5.3	5,029	3.7	▼4.4
Tierschutzpartei					2,085	1.5	▲0.6
PARTEI	Michael Hanses	2,558	1.9		1,623	1.2	▲0.3
dieBasis	Michael Kirchner	1,750	1.3		1,485	1.1	
FW	Thorsten Michaelis	1,466	1.1		843	0.6	▲0.4
Pirates	Eric Tiggemann	1,434	1.1	▼1.6	804	0.6	▼0.1
Team Todenhöfer					660	0.5	
Volt					278	0.2	
Gesundheitsforschung					186	0.1	0.0
LIEBE					180	0.1	
ÖDP					143	0.1	0.0
LfK					140	0.1	
NPD					129	0.1	▼0.1
MLPD	Achim Czylwick	186	0.1	▼0.4	105	0.1	0.0
Bündnis C					104	0.1	
Humanists					96	0.1	0.0
V-Partei3					83	0.1	0.0
du.					65	0.0	
DKP					48	0.0	0.0
PdF					37	0.0	
LKR					20	0.0	
SGP					11	0.0	0.0
Informal votes		1,252			1,006		
Total valid votes		135,454			135,700		
Turnout		136,706	78.0	▲0.9			
SPD hold	Majority	14,636	10.8	▲7.0			

=== 2017 election ===
Federal election (2017): Ennepe-Ruhr-Kreis II
Notes:	Blue background denotes the winner of the electorate vote. Pink background denotes a candidate elected from their party list. Yellow background denotes an electorate win by a list member, or other incumbent. A ✓ or ✗ denotes status of any incumbent, win or lose respectively.						
Party	Candidate	Votes	%	±%	Party votes	%	±%
SPD	✓ Ralf Kapschack	49,333	36.7	▼5.6	40,767	29.9	▼8.4
CDU	Ralf Brauksiepe	44,273	32.9	▼2.8	37,284	27.3	▼5.7
FDP	Jürgen Alexander Weber	14,175	10.5	▲8.5	17,270	12.7	▲8.2
AfD					13,190	9.7	▲5.8
Greens	Janosch Dahmen (Note: Dahmen entered the Bundestag on the Greens list after the resignation of Katja Dörner in November 2020.)	11,538	8.6	▲0.3	11,142	8.2	▼0.9
Left	Heinz-Dieter Kempka	10,804	8.0	▲3.0	11,092	8.1	▲1.7
Tierschutzpartei					1,239	0.9	
PARTEI					1,158	0.8	▲0.5
Pirates	Roland Löpke	3,565	2.7	▲0.4	881	0.6	▲1.6
AD-DEMOKRATEN					452	0.3	
FW					291	0.2	▲0.1
NPD					264	0.2	▼0.7
DiB					198	0.1	
ÖDP					183	0.1	0.0
BGE					163	0.1	
MLPD	Achim Czylwick	688	0.5	▲0.3	158	0.1	0.0
V-Partei³					146	0.1	
Volksabstimmung					143	0.1	▼0.1
Gesundheitsforschung					135	0.1	
DM					133	0.1	
Die Humanisten					80	0.1	
DKP					46	0.0	
SGP					9	0.0	0.0
Informal votes		3,256			1,208		
Total valid votes		134,376			136,424		
Turnout		137,632	77.1	▲2.7			
SPD hold	Majority	5,060	3.8	▼2.7			

=== 2013 election ===
Federal election (2013): Ennepe-Ruhr-Kreis II
Notes:	Blue background denotes the winner of the electorate vote. Pink background denotes a candidate elected from their party list. Yellow background denotes an electorate win by a list member, or other incumbent. A ✓ or ✗ denotes status of any incumbent, win or lose respectively.						
Party	Candidate	Votes	%	±%	Party votes	%	±%
SPD	Ralf Kapschack	56,197	42.3	▲1.4	50,946	38.3	▲3.4
CDU	Ralf Brauksiepe	47,530	35.8	▲5.4	44,028	33.1	▲6.3
Greens	Janosch Dahmen	10,964	8.3	▼0.4	12,071	9.1	▼2.3
Left	Helmut Kanand	6,743	5.1	▼3.3	8,498	6.4	▼3.0
AfD	Christian Rombeck	3,993	3.0		5,178	3.9	
Pirates	Roland Löpke	3,003	2.3		2,951	2.2	▲0.6
FDP	Rosemarie Steinhauer	2,666	2.0	▼8.0	5,977	4.5	▼8.0
NPD	Dieter Schulz	1,523	1.1	▼0.2	1,241	0.9	▼0.1
PARTEI					487	0.4	
PRO					323	0.2	
Volksabstimmung					222	0.2	▲0.1
FW					197	0.1	
ÖDP					187	0.1	▲0.1
MLPD		233	0.2	0.0	156	0.1	0.0
Nichtwahler					153	0.1	
REP					152	0.1	▼0.1
BIG					143	0.1	
Party of Reason					75	0.1	
RRP					64	0.0	▼0.1
Die Rechte					44	0.0	
PSG					37	0.0	0.0
BüSo					19	0.0	0.0
Informal votes		1,897			1,600		
Total valid votes		132,852			133,149		
Turnout		134,749	74.4	▲0.3			
SPD hold	Majority	8,667	6.5	▼4.0			

=== 2009 election ===
Federal election (2009): Ennepe-Ruhr-Kreis II
Notes:	Blue background denotes the winner of the electorate vote. Pink background denotes a candidate elected from their party list. Yellow background denotes an electorate win by a list member, or other incumbent. A ✓ or ✗ denotes status of any incumbent, win or lose respectively.						
Party	Candidate	Votes	%	±%	Party votes	%	±%
SPD	✓ Christel Humme	54,845	40.9	▼11.5	46,848	34.8	▼12.3
CDU	Ralf Brauksiepe	40,763	30.4	▼0.5	35,927	26.7	▲0.4
FDP	Konrad Schily	13,392	10.0	▲4.9	16,778	12.5	▲3.3
Greens	Janosch Dahmen	11,621	8.7	▲3.8	15,248	11.3	▲2.8
Left	Wolfgang Pauli	11,180	8.3	▲3.9	12,596	9.4	▲3.5
Pirates					2,180	1.6	
NPD	Dieter Schulz	1,762	1.3	▲0.4	1,382	1.0	▲0.3
Tierschutzpartei					1,103	0.8	0.0
FAMILIE					673	0.5	▲0.1
RENTNER					559	0.4	
REP					307	0.2	0.0
RRP					194	0.1	
MLPD	Jakobus Fröhlich	285	0.2	▲0.1	153	0.1	0.0
Volksabstimmung					126	0.1	0.0
ÖDP					116	0.1	
DVU					108	0.1	
Centre					61	0.0	0.0
PSG					42	0.0	0.0
BüSo					29	0.0	0.0
Informal votes		1,727			1,430		
Total valid votes		134,133			134,430		
Turnout		135,860	74.1	▼6.1			
SPD hold	Majority	14,082	10.5	▼11.0			

=== 2005 election ===
Federal election (2005): Ennepe-Ruhr-Kreis II
Notes:	Blue background denotes the winner of the electorate vote. Pink background denotes a candidate elected from their party list. Yellow background denotes an electorate win by a list member, or other incumbent. A ✓ or ✗ denotes status of any incumbent, win or lose respectively.						
Party	Candidate	Votes	%	±%	Party votes	%	±%
SPD	✓ Christel Humme	76,854	52.4	▼3.3	69,311	47.2	▼4.4
CDU	Ralf Brauksiepe	45,344	30.9	▲0.9	38,740	26.4	▼0.5
FDP	Konrad Schily	7,502	5.1	▼0.7	13,426	9.1	▲0.7
Greens	Irmingard Schewe-Gerigk	7,166	4.9	▼1.8	12,531	8.5	▼1.1
Left	Willi Kloppenburg	6,506	4.4	▲3.2	8,641	5.9	▲4.6
Tierschutzpartei	Ingeborg Gräßer	1,858	1.3		1,217	0.8	▲0.3
NPD	Dieter Schulz	1,338	0.9		1,086	0.7	▲0.5
Familie					552	0.4	▲0.2
GRAUEN					452	0.3	▲0.1
REP					345	0.2	0.0
MLPD	Heinz Vöhringer	220	0.1		190	0.1	
PBC					780	0.1	0.0
From Now on... Democracy Through Referendum					102	0.1	
Socialist Equality Party					61	0.0	
Centre					25	0.0	
BüSo					24	0.0	0.0
Informal votes		1,910			1,815		
Total valid votes		146,788			146,883		
Turnout		148,698	80.2	▼1.1			
SPD hold	Majority	31,510	21.5				
