= Hammertal (Ruhr region) =

Valley in Germany

Coordinates: 51°23′21″N 7°15′48″E

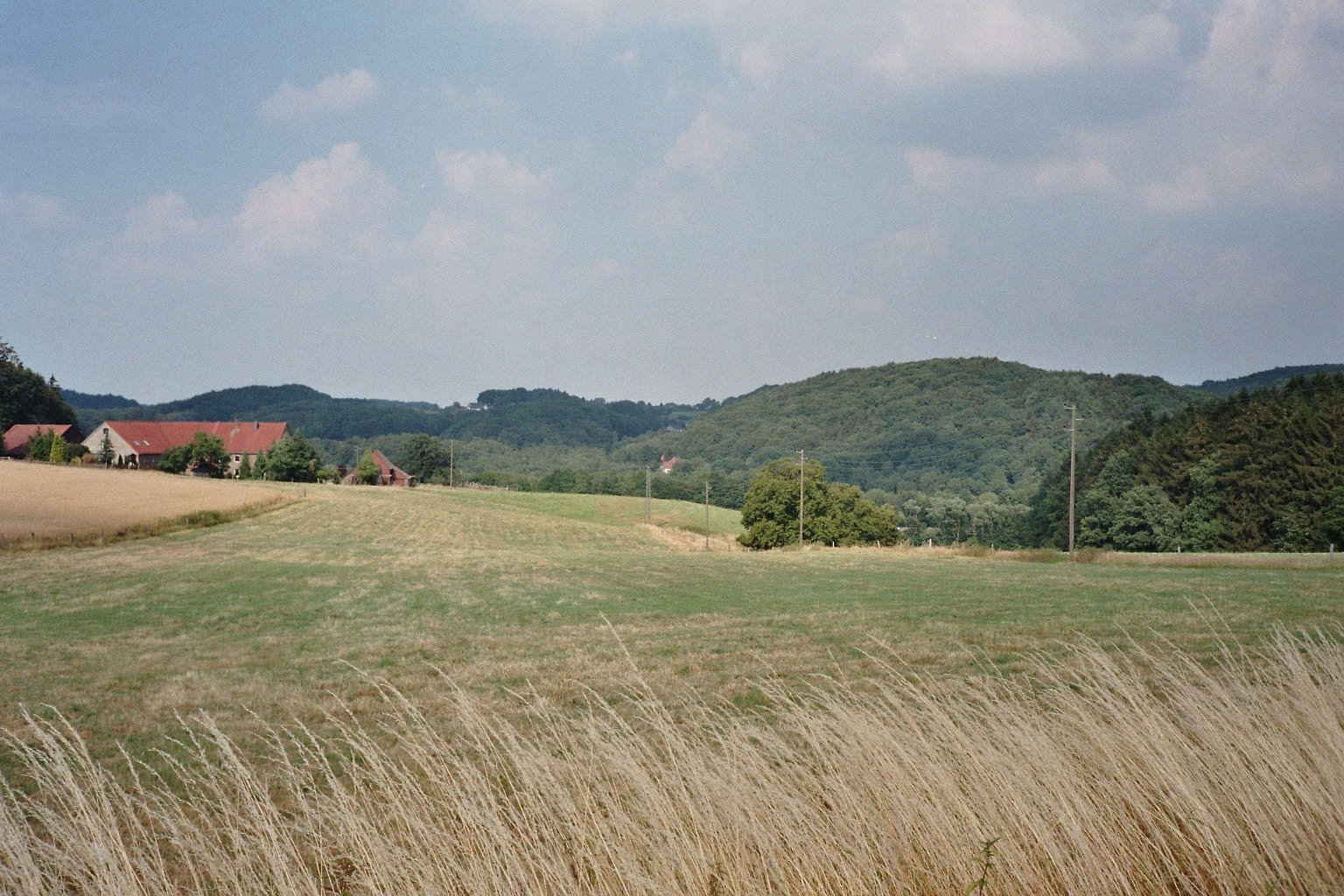

The Hammertal (also known as Hammerthal) is a valley between Witten, Sprockhövel and Hattingen-Blankenstein.

It gets drained from Pleßbach northwards into the Ruhr.

The valley got its name in the 19th century by the forging hammers, which got actuated by danaides. At the same time the coal mining started in the Hammertal, so the valley is one of the earliest places of Ruhr mining.

Away from freeway 43 and road 551 the Hammertal kept its rurality.
