= Axel Echeverria =

German politician

Axel Echeverría
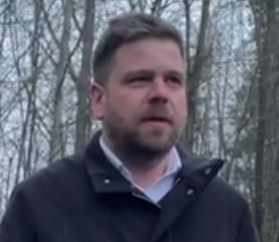

Member of the Bundestag
- Incumbent
- Assumed office 2021

Personal details
- Born: 19 March 1980 (age 46) Witten, West Germany
- Party: SPD
- Education: Ruhr University Bochum

Inaki Axel Echeverría Stefanski (born 19 March 1980) is a Spanish-German politician of the Social Democratic Party (SPD) who has been serving as a member of the Bundestag from 2021 to 2025.

== Early life and education ==
Echeverria was born in 1980 in the West German town of Witten. From 2019 to 2021, he worked at the Federal Employment Agency.

== Political career ==
Echeverria was elected directly to the Bundestag in 2021, representing the Ennepe-Ruhr-Kreis II district. In parliament, he has been serving on the Committee on Petitions, the Committee on the Environment, Nature Conservation, Nuclear Safety and Consumer Protection, and the Parliamentary Advisory Board on Sustainable Development.

Within his parliamentary group, Echeverria is part of a working group on migration and integration. He also belongs to the Parliamentary Left, a left-wing movement within the group.

In February 2025, Echeverria lost his seat in district Ennepe-Ruhr-Kreis II against Katja Strauss-Köster.
