= Operation Desert =

WW2 German project to produce fuel from shale oil

Operation Desert (German: Unternehmen Wüste) was a German synthetic fuel project during World War II. It attempted to build a shale oil industrial production complex for utilization of Swabian Alb oil shale deposits (Posidonia Shale).

The project was driven by the fuel needs of the German army at the last phase of World War II due to decreasing conventional petroleum supplies. Three companies conducted pilot tests. LIAS-Ölschiefer-Forschungsgesellschaft mbH, established in September 1942, started tests in Frommern. Kohle-Öl-Union von Busse KG, established on 30 July 1943 in Berlin, tested in-situ retorting on the outskirts of Schörzingen. Deutsche Ölschiefer-Forschungsgesellschaft mbH, established on 20 September 1943 in Schömberg, became later the core of the Operation Desert. Schutzstaffel (SS) and Hermann Göring personally became involved in the project in late 1943. On 2 May 1944, SS established oil shale company Deutsche Schieferöl GmbH for its own shale oil plant near Erzingen. Also IG Farben became involved in shale oil. In July 1944, Operation Desert became a part of the Geilenberg Programme.

For the Operation Desert construction of ten shale oil extraction plants in Württemberg and Hohenzollern were ordered by Edmund Geilenberg. Prisoners from seven nearby subcamps of the Natzweiler-Struthof concentration camp, established by the route of Tübingen - Aulendorf and Nebenstrecke Balingen- Rottweil railway lines, were used as a workforce. The main contractor for building these plants was Deutsche Bergwerks- und Hüttenbau GmbH, a subsidiary of Reichswerke Hermann Göring. About 5,000 prisoners were used for construction works and more than 10,000 prisoners had been exploited for the oil-shale works. When Soviet troops advanced into Estonia in 1944, about 200 oil shale specialists from Estonia, employees of Baltische Öl GmbH , an affiliate of IG Farben, were evacuated to Schömberg.

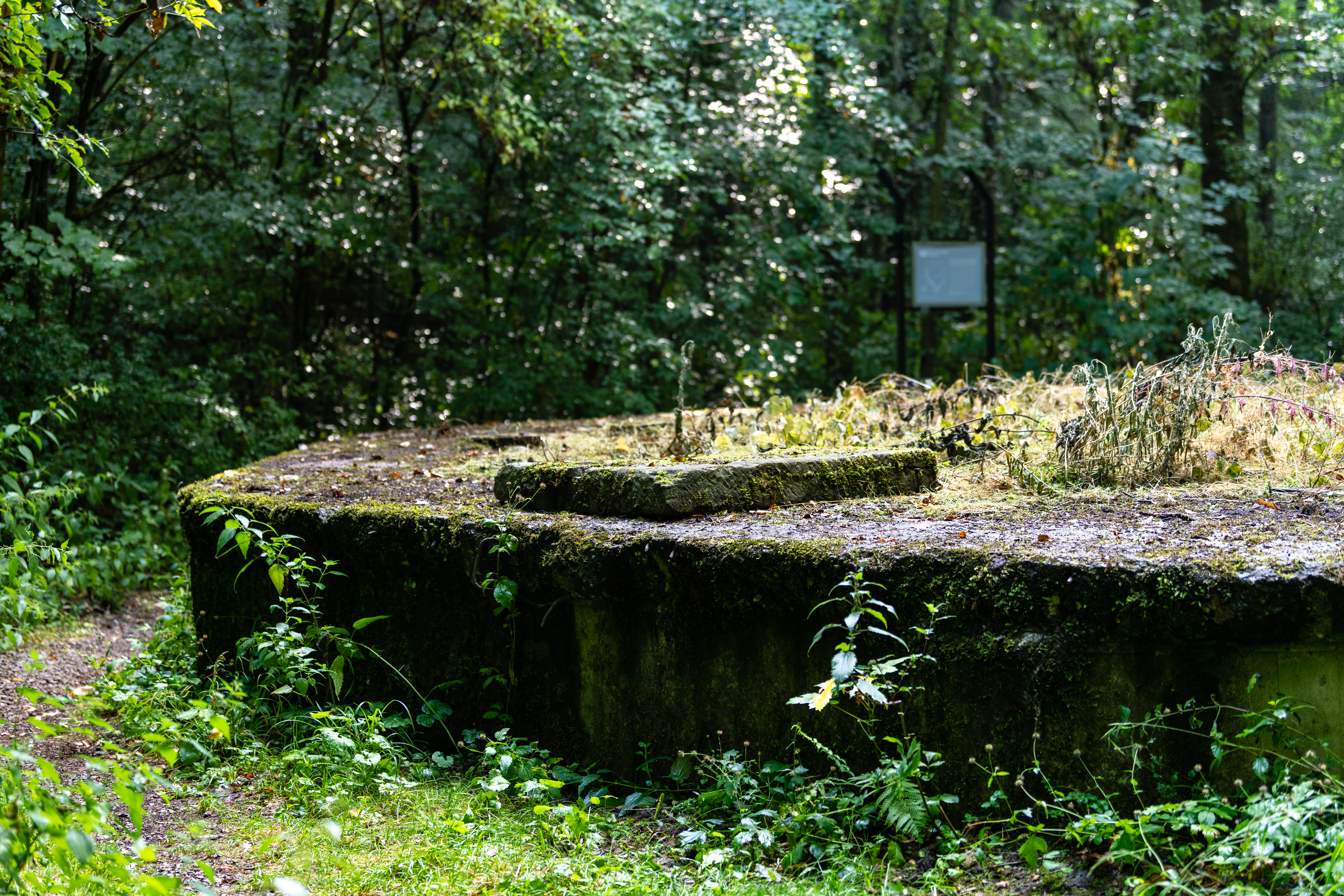
Oil tank in the former area of the concentration camp Bisingen

However, out of ten planned plants only four became operational. The technology was primitive carbonization and oil yield was low. Mined oil shale was heaped into mounds which were ignited after covering by peat. Distilled shale oil and oil shale gas were collected through 300-millimetre (12 in) perforated pipes. Oil was separated from gas by electric filters. Until the end of the war, only 1,500 tonnes of shale oil was produced.

After the war French occupation forces tried continue the shale oil production operations but due to unprofitability it was halted in 1948.

== Bibliography ==
- Holmberg, Rurik (2008). Survival of the Unfit. Path Dependence and the Estonian Oil Shale Industry (PDF). Linköping Studies in Arts and Science. Vol. 427. Linköping University.
- Holoch, Rudi (1978). "Das Lager Schörzingen in der "Gruppe Wüste"" [The Schörzingen Camp in the Operation Desert]. In Vorländer, Herwart (ed.). Nationalsozialistische Konzentrationslager im Dienste der totalen Kriegsführung. Sieben württembergische Außenkommandos des Konzentrationslagers Natzweiler/Elsass [National Socialist Concentration Camp in the Service of Total Warfare. Seven Württemberg's Subcamps of the Natzweiler/Alsace Concentration Camp]. Publications of the Commission for Historical Regional Studies in Baden-Württemberg (in German). Vol. 91. Stuttgart: Kohlhammer Verlag. pp. 225–266. ISBN 9783170043619.
- Longerich, Peter (2012). Heinrich Himmler: A Life. Oxford University Press. ISBN 9780199592326.
- Megargee, Geoffrey P. (2009). Encyclopedia of Camps and Ghettos, 1933–1945: Ghettos in German-Occupied Eastern Europe. Vol. 1. Indiana University Press. ISBN 9780253003508.
