= Murad Bayraktar =

Murad Bayraktar (* 23 August 1973 in Witten) is a German-Turkish journalist, editor and radio presenter. He works as Head of Program Management at Deutschlandradio.

== Early life and education ==
Murad Bayraktar spent his childhood and youth in Germany and Turkey. He was born and raised in Witten, where he also attended primary school. After primary school, he went to boarding school in Istanbul and subsequently studied English and American Studies at Istanbul University. At the same time, he was already working for TV and radio stations in Istanbul.

After returning to Germany in 1996, he completed a master's degree in Politics, Sociology, and English Studies at Ruhr University Bochum.

== Professional career ==
=== Early years as a journalist (1992–2003) ===
From 1992, Bayraktar worked in Istanbul as a news editor and freelance journalist. In 1997, he began working as a freelancer for Westdeutscher Rundfunk Köln (WDR), contributing to programs such as "Köln Radyosu" and "Café Alaturka." He also worked for other public broadcasters, including Deutsche Welle, and was deputy editor-in-chief of "Türkis," the first German-Turkish print magazine for young people in Germany.

He was editor-in-chief of the intercultural online platform "cafeterra.de," which was funded by the Ministry of Culture of North Rhine-Westphalia and the Robert Bosch Foundation and operated by the Cultural Forum Turkey-Germany. In 2005, he hosted the 13-part television series "Madem ki oradasınız" on Turkish youth culture in Europe for the Turkish broadcaster TRT.

=== Positions at WDR (2003–2025) ===
In 2003, Bayraktar became an editor and subsequently an editor with special responsibilities at WDR, initially at Funkhaus Europa (now Cosmo (radio station)). From 2009, he headed the Turkish editorial department of WDR. In 2013, he moved to the editorial office for regional radio programs in Düsseldorf, and from 2017 he was deputy head of the WDR regional studio in Düsseldorf.

In 2019, he took over as head of the cross-media regional studios program group (department) with overall responsibility for the "Lokalzeit" brand across all platforms. He was responsible for building the digital unit of the regional studios.

In 2021, Bayraktar moved to the broadcasting headquarters in Cologne and became head of ARD coordination at WDR. He was thus part of the management team of the WDR newsroom and the editorial office for politics and current affairs. In this role, he was also jointly responsible for the ARD's foreign bureaus. Most recently, he served as acting head of WDR's foreign news desk.

On the ARD's "tagesthemen" news program, he provided commentary on topics such as migration, diversity, and Turkey. For example, a video with racist slogans on Sylt or opposition protests in Turkey.

=== Deutschlandradio (since 2025) ===
On June 1, 2025, Bayraktar was appointed Head of the Program Management Department at Deutschlandradio. This department is responsible for the production of linear and non-linear audio content in Cologne and Berlin, including the "Broadcast & Production" department in Cologne and Berlin, "Documentation & Archives," and "Editorial Systems and Processes."

== Engagement and awards ==
Bayraktar received the John J. McCloy Journalism Fellowship from the American Council on Germany in 2005 and conducted research in Washington, D.C., New York, and California on multicultural media in the USA.

He is involved in voluntary work at, among other organizations, the KulturForum TürkeiDeutschland, the Documentation Center and Museum on Migration in Germany, and the association Neue deutsche Medienmacher*innen, of which he was a founding board member.

In 2008, he co-directed the Turkish version of the radio play Misafir / Gast-Spiele by Deniz Başpınar with Uwe Schareck. The radio play won an award at the WDR radio play competition "Sind Sie zu fremd, bist Du zu deutsch?" (Are you too foreign, are you too German?). He also co-directed the radio play Cenaze / Die Leiche by Aydın Işık.

== Selected publications ==
- "Little Istanbul" – Contribution to the anthology "What Do You Live?" (ed.: Ayşegül Acevit, Birand Bingül)
- "Between Migration and Integration" – Contribution to the volume "Between Worlds and Official Labels" (ed.: Ludger Pries)
