= Edmund Geilenberg =

German official (1906–1964)

Personal details
- Born: 13 January 1906 Witten-Buchholz-Kaempen
- Died: 19 October 1964 (aged 58) Bassum
- Party: National Socialist German Workers' Party (Nazi)

Edmund Geilenberg (born 13 January 1906, Witten-Buchholz-Kaempen – died 19 October 1964, Bassum) was a German official of World War II who headed an emergency 1944 decentralization program, the Geilenbergstab or Geilenbergprogramm (Geilenberg Special Staff), to disperse Nazi Germany oil production. The program included the Cuckoo project for an underground oil plant to be "carved out of the Himmelsburg" North of the Mittelwerk, as well as plans for an oil facility at Ebensee. "Geilenberg used as many as 350,000 men for the repair, rebuilding, and dispersal of the bombed plants and for new underground construction [which] were incomplete when the war ended".

Defenses included a 21 June 1944, order for a minimum number of flak guns to be placed at Pölitz (200), Auschwitz (200), Hamburg (200), Brüx (170, Gelsenkirchen (140), Scholven (140), Wesseling (150), Heydebreck (130), Leuna (120), Blechhammer (100), Moosbierbaum (100), and Böhlen (70); Germany and the Second World War and the Ruhland Fischer-Tropsch plant and other synthetic oil plants were upgraded to be "hydrogenation fortresses" (e.g., the plants in the Leipzig area were protected by over 1,000 guns). In addition to increased active defenses, the facilities (German: Hydrierfestungen) incorporated blast walls and concrete "dog houses" around vital machinery. Similar to the technical experts transferred for the V-2 rocket program, 7,000 engineers were released from the German Army to provide technical support for oil facilities.

== See also ==
- Oil Campaign chronology of World War II
- Dessauer Ufer
