= Witten-Hohenstein =

Coordinates: 51°25′43″N 7°21′11″E

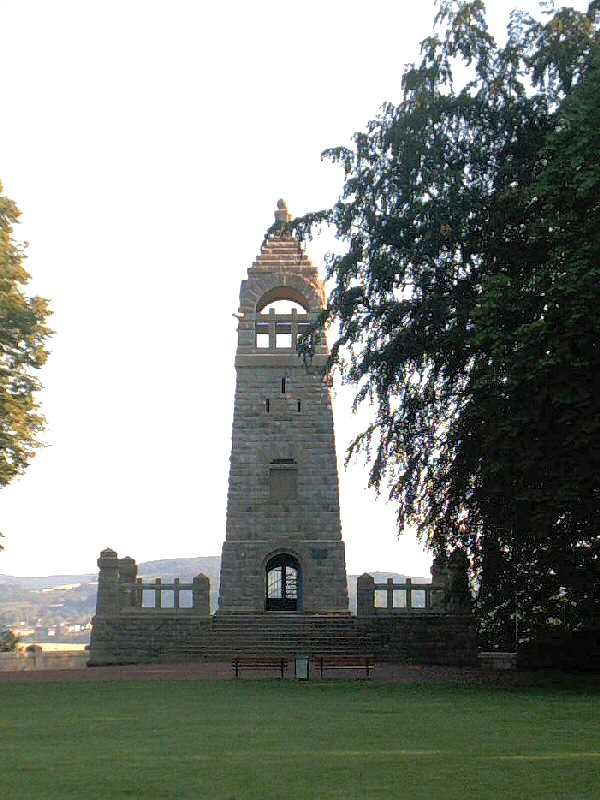
The Berger Monument in Witten

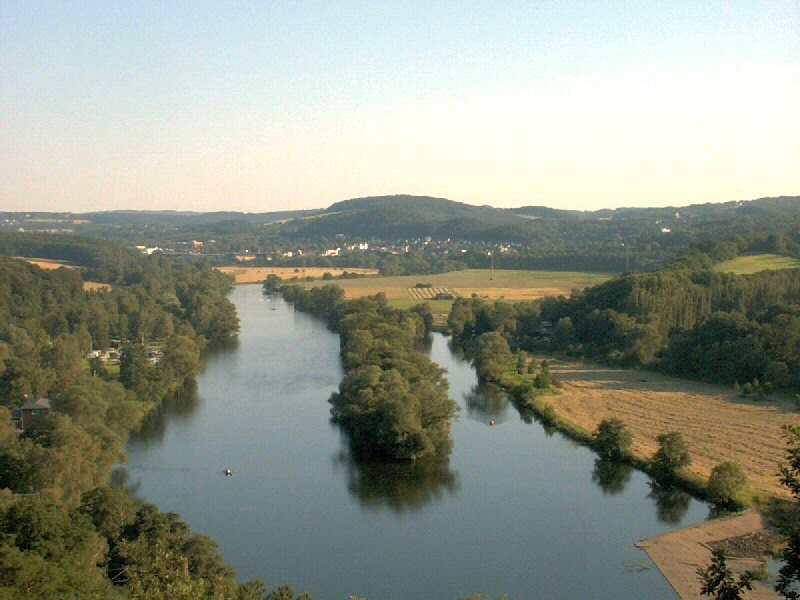
View from the monument over the Ruhr valley

The Hohenstein is the central forest of Witten, (North Rhine-Westphalia, Germany). As a forest its name is just "Hohenstein". But "Hohenstein" is also the name of a city-district of Witten's borough "Mitte". It has the district-number 19. As a district it has nearly no population.

As a forest the Hohenstein is well known in the region, the "Mittlere Ruhrtal" (Middle Ruhr valley) because of its Berger-Denkmal, from which visitors have a view over the whole Ruhr valley between the cities of Witten and Wetter. The monument was built in remembrance of the German industrialist Louis Constans Berger (1829-1891), whose factory – formerly Gussstahlwerk - is still producing steel for the world market. The factory is now known as Deutsches Edelstahlwerk.
