= Witten-Wullen =

Coordinates: 51°27′23.73″N 7°21′33.31″E

Wullen is a city-district of Witten-Annen, which is a part of the City of Witten, (North Rhine-Westphalia, Germany). Wullen is placed about 3 kilometres northeast of the City of Witten.

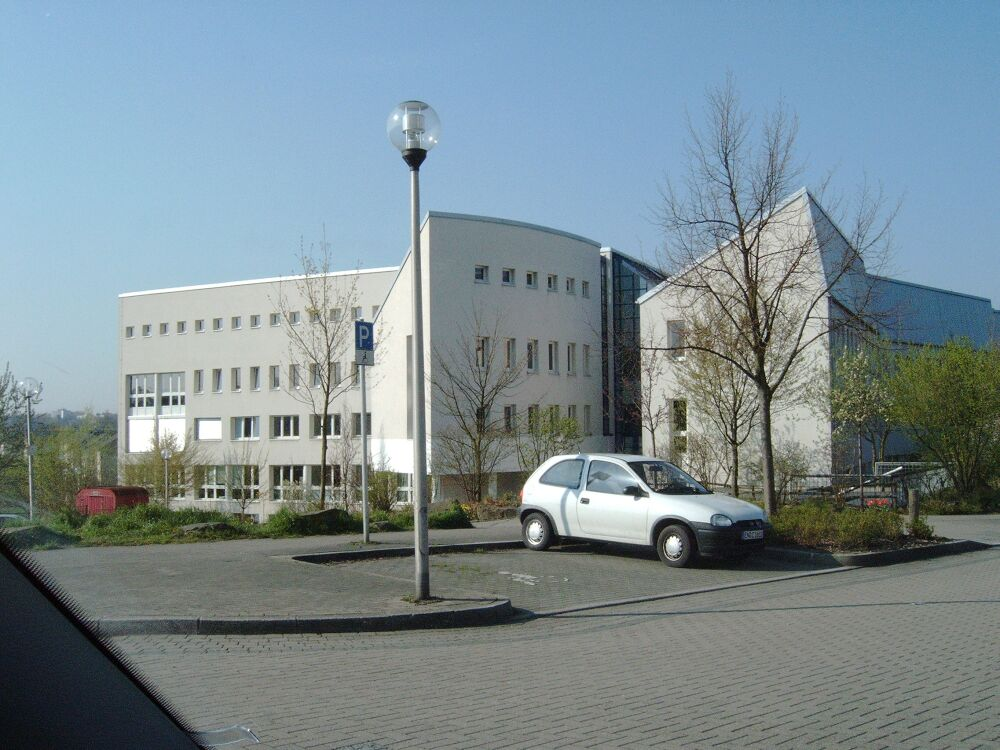
Main building of the Universität Witten/Herdecke

== History ==
- 1019: First mentioned.
- 1809: French soldiers occupy the village, with other villages of the area it became part of the "Mairie Witten".
- 1885: Incorporation with the "Landkreis Hoerde"
- 1929: Incorporation with Witten.
- 1991–1993: The campus of the Witten/Herdecke University was built in Wullen.
