= Witten-Stockum =

Coordinates: 51°28′N 7°22′E

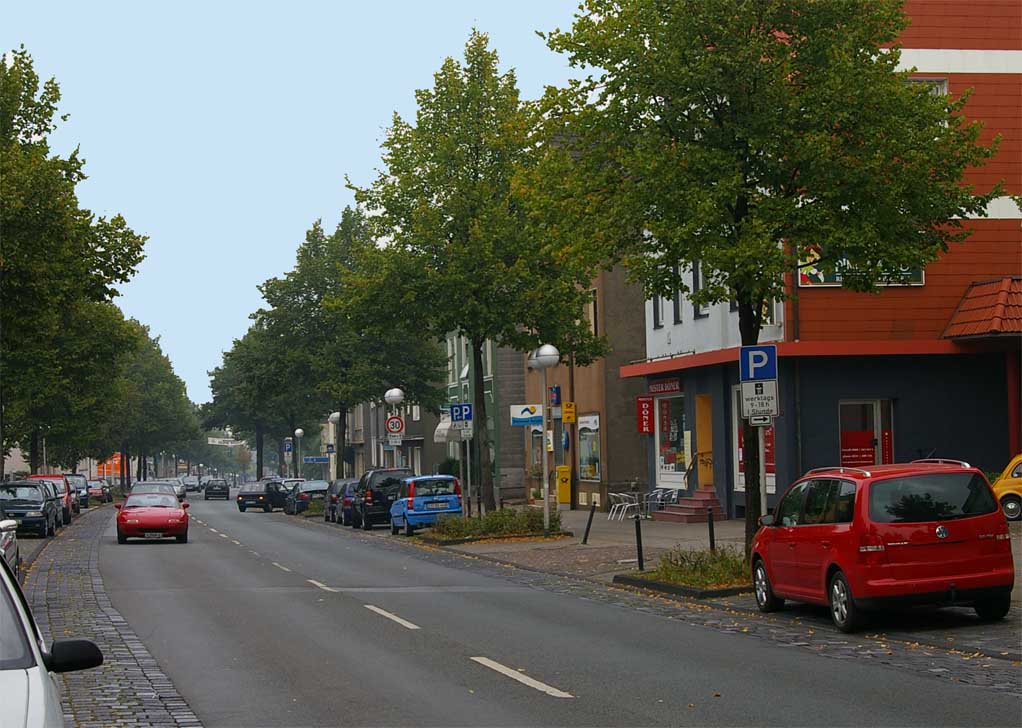
The main street of Stockum - The Hoerder Strasse

Witten-Stockum is a borough of the City of Witten in North Rhine-Westphalia, Germany. It has about 6300 inhabitants (2003).

== History ==
Stockum was first mentioned in 882 as villa stochem. Villa stochem was a little castle that was owned by a knight who called himself "op der Heyde". During the so-called Dortmunder Fehde in 1388/89, Stochem was burned down by soldiers from the Archbishop of Cologne, who fought a war against Dortmund, just a few kilometres north of the village. In 1423/24 it was burned down for the second time - this time by troops of the Margrave of the County Mark who fought a war against his own brother.

In 1701 Stockum became a part of Prussia. In 1752 the first coal mine was built and the era of mining began. This era ended in 1904.

In 1929 Stockum became a borough of Witten.

== Transportation ==
It has a bus connection to central Witten and to the station of Dortmund-Oespel by bus line 371. On weekdays Stockum is also served by bus line 373 to Witten-Annen. At the weekend, the night bus line NE17 to Bochum-Langendreer via central Witten stops here.
