= Nadja Lüders =

German politician (born 1970)

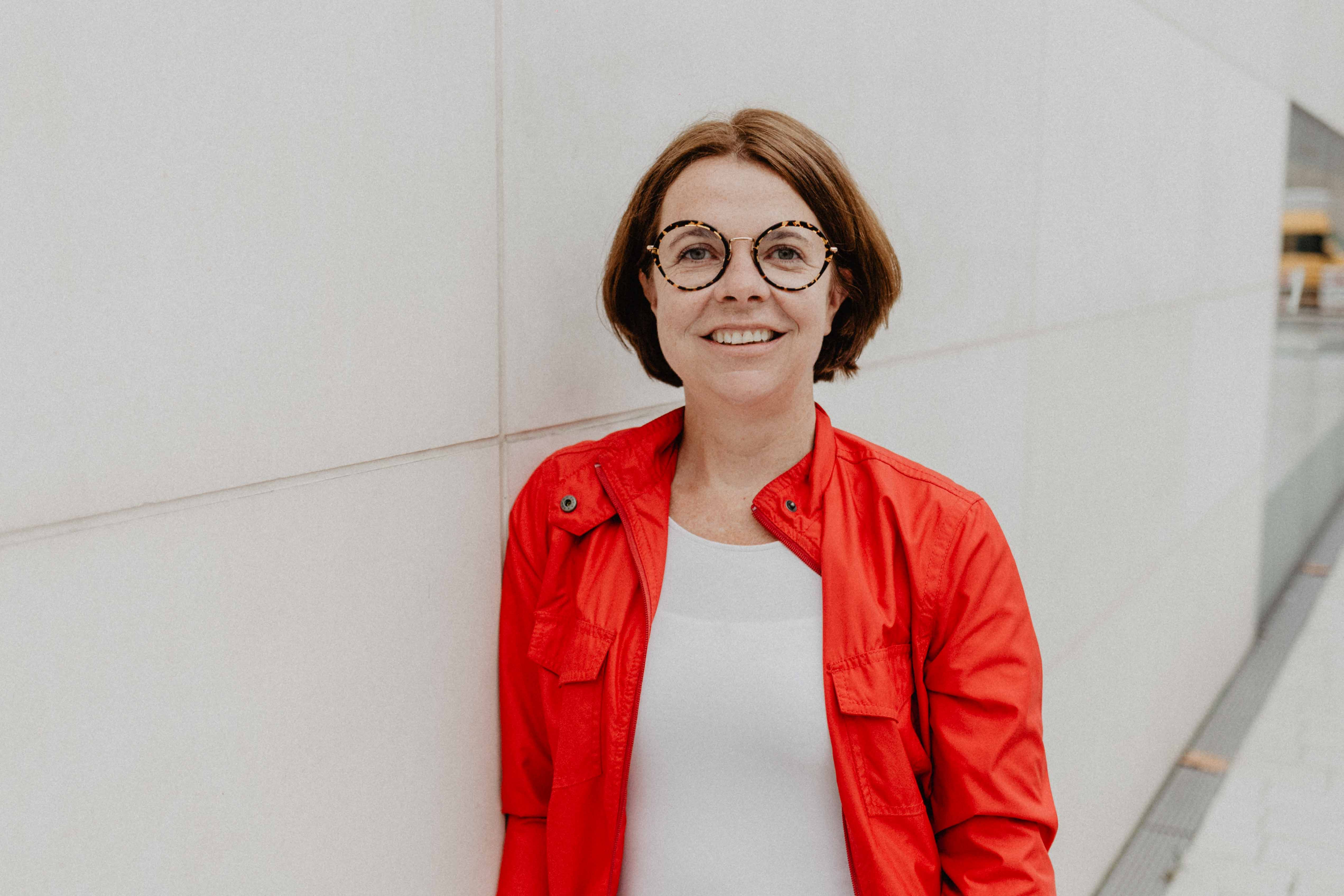
- Lüders in 2021

Member of the Landtag of North Rhine-Westphalia
- Incumbent
- Assumed office 9 June 2010
- Preceded by: Harald Schartau
- Constituency: Dortmund III

Personal details
- Born: 15 October 1970 (age 55) Witten
- Party: Social Democratic Party (since 1996)

Nadja Lüders (born 15 October 1970 in Witten) is a German politician serving as a member of the Landtag of North Rhine-Westphalia since 2010. From 2018 to 2023, she served as secretary general of SPD North Rhine-Westphalia.
