= Dampf-Bahn-Club Sprockhövel =

Miniature railway in Germany

Coordinates: 51.34470°N 7.28939°E

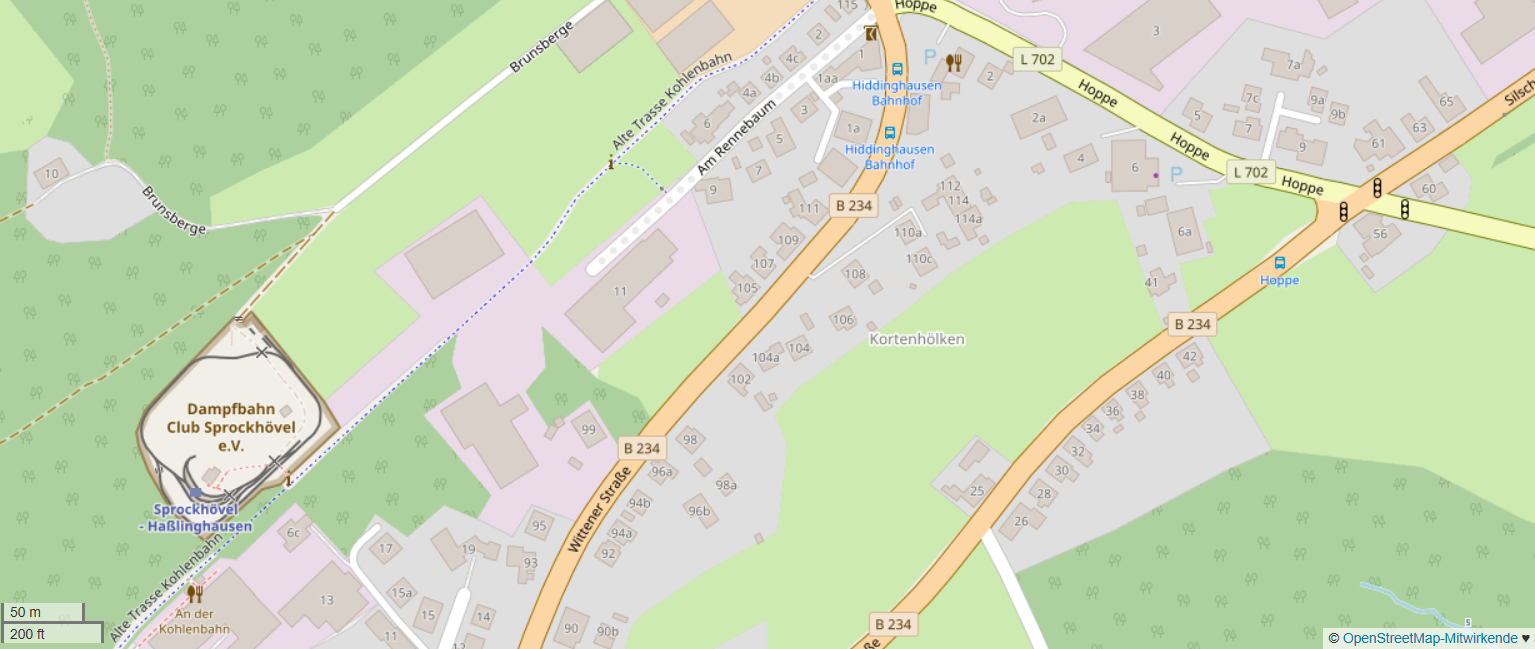
- Dampf-Bahn-Club Sprockhövel

Technical
- Line length: 0.4 kilometres (0.25 mi)
- Track gauge: 127 mm (5 inches) and 184 mm (7¼ inches)

The Dampf-Bahn-Club Sprockhövel has operated passenger transport on their ridable miniature railway with 127 mm (5 inches) and 184 mm (7¼ inches) gauge in Sprockhövel-Haßlinghausen in North Rhine Westphalia, Germany since 2004.

== Location ==
The rail track is located in the immediate vicinity of the former railway line Schee-Silschede, which is now used as a bicycle trail and is part of the Von-Ruhr-zur-Ruhr-Radweg.

== Route ==
The route, which runs in two partly winding circles over an area of about one hectare, is about 400 metres (440 yd) long. The tracks are laid on a concrete foundation with a camber in the bends.

This is a complex construction, which is rare in garden railways, as the tracks are usually laid as in the raw-model in a ballast bed. With financial support from a local foundation, the association succeeded in 2017 to build a steel bridge, which is also used as a track underpass.

The club regularly organizes public railway trips between April and September, which attracts mainly local families for leisure activities.

== Rolling stock ==
Most of the locomotive models are privately owned. These are driven by real steam or by electric motors that obtain their energy from accumulators. The scales of the vehicles vary between 1: 8 and 1: 3. Some locomotives were built in-house.
