= Carsten Keuler =

German footballer

Personal information
- Date of birth: 30 August 1971 (age 55)
- Place of birth: Witten, West Germany
- Height: 1.83 m (6 ft 0 in)
- Position: Defender

Youth career
- –1986: FV Engers 07
- 1989–1990: 1. FC Köln

Senior career*
Years	Team	Apps	(Gls)
1990–1992	1. FC Köln II		
1992–1994	1. FC Köln	28	(2)
1994–1996	SG Wattenscheid 09	51	(2)
1996–1997	1. FC Nürnberg		
1997–1999	SpVgg Unterhaching		
1999–2001	Stuttgarter Kickers	61	(3)
2001–2004	SSV Jahn Regensburg	101	(3)
2004–2005	SV Wehen	11	(0)
2007	SpVgg Bendorf		
2008–2009	FV Engers 07		

International career
1992–1993	Germany U-21	2	(0)
- * Club domestic league appearances and goals

Carsten Keuler (born 30 August 1971 in Witten) is a German former football player. He spent two seasons in the Bundesliga with 1. FC Köln.
