= Herbede =

Coordinates: 51°25′20″N 7°16′54″E

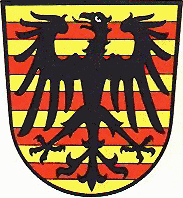
Coat of arms since 1936

Since 1975 the former city of Herbede is a part of the city of Witten (North Rhine-Westphalia, Germany). As one of the eight boroughs of Witten, it is now called Witten-Herbede. Before the incorporation with Witten in 1975, Herbede was a city in the administrative district Ennepe-Ruhr-Kreis. Herbede is placed about 5 kilometres southwest of the city of Witten in the southern Ruhr area in the Ruhr valley and has about 13,100 inhabitants today. Herbede has good bus connections and is served by bus lines 320, 374, 375, SB38, SB67 and at the weekend by night bus NE17. There are direct bus connections to central Witten, Witten-Annen, Witten-Rüdinghausen, Witten-Heven, Ruhr University Bochum, Wetter, Gevelsberg, Ennepetal, Hattingen and Wuppertal.

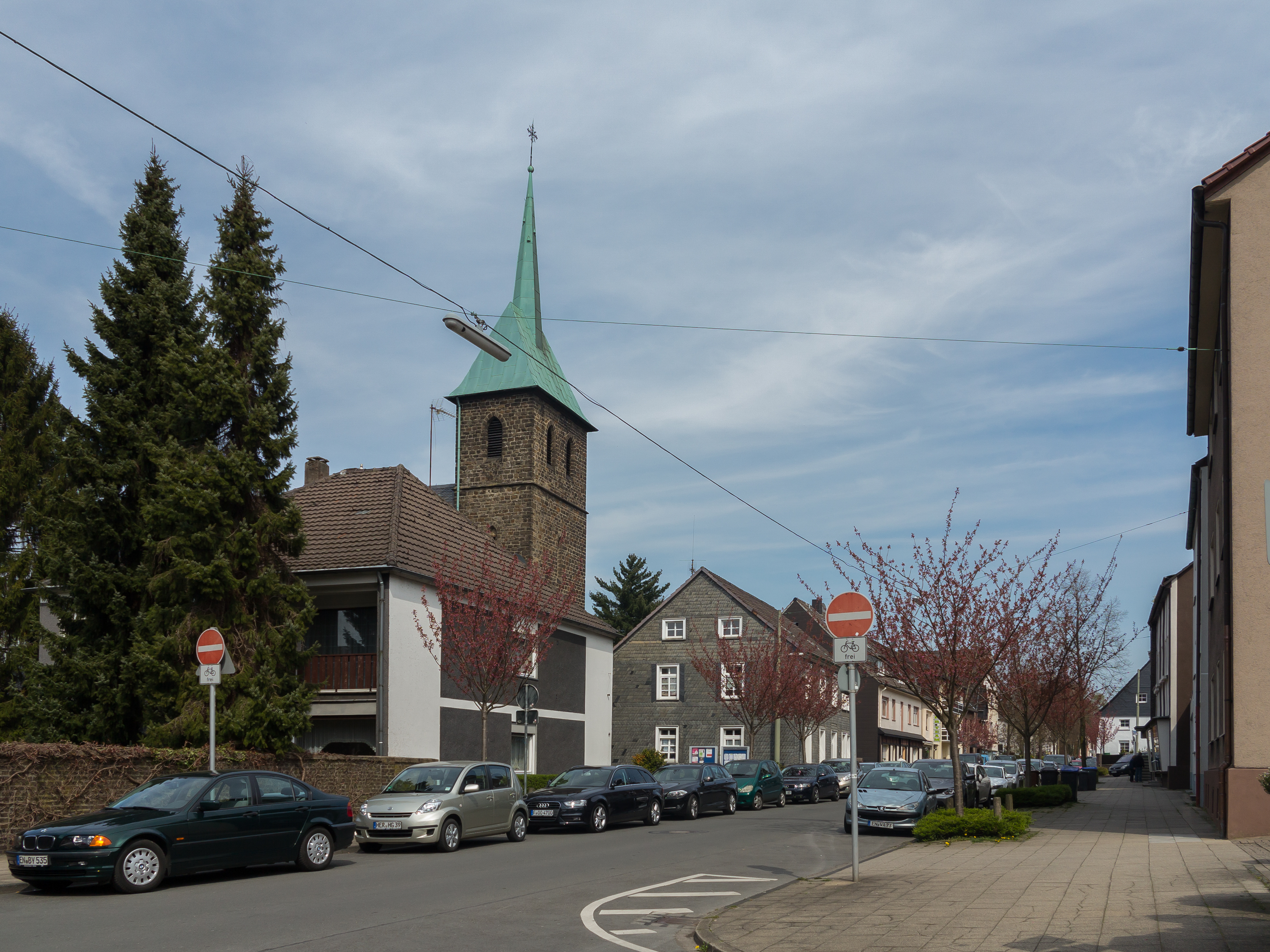
Church: die Sankt Peter und Paul Kirche

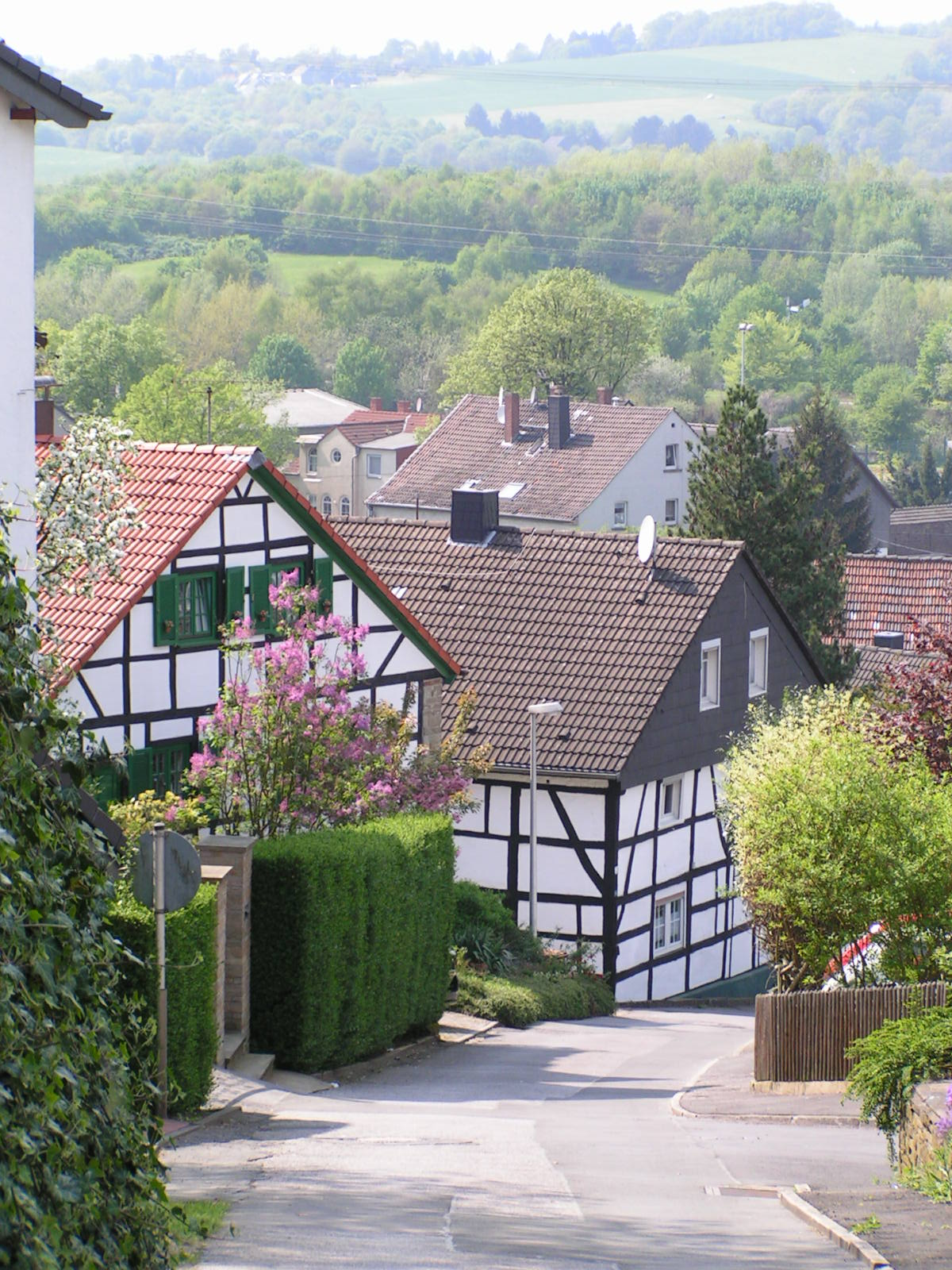
The "Schulstraße" in Witten-Herbede with view about the Ruhr-Valley

== History ==
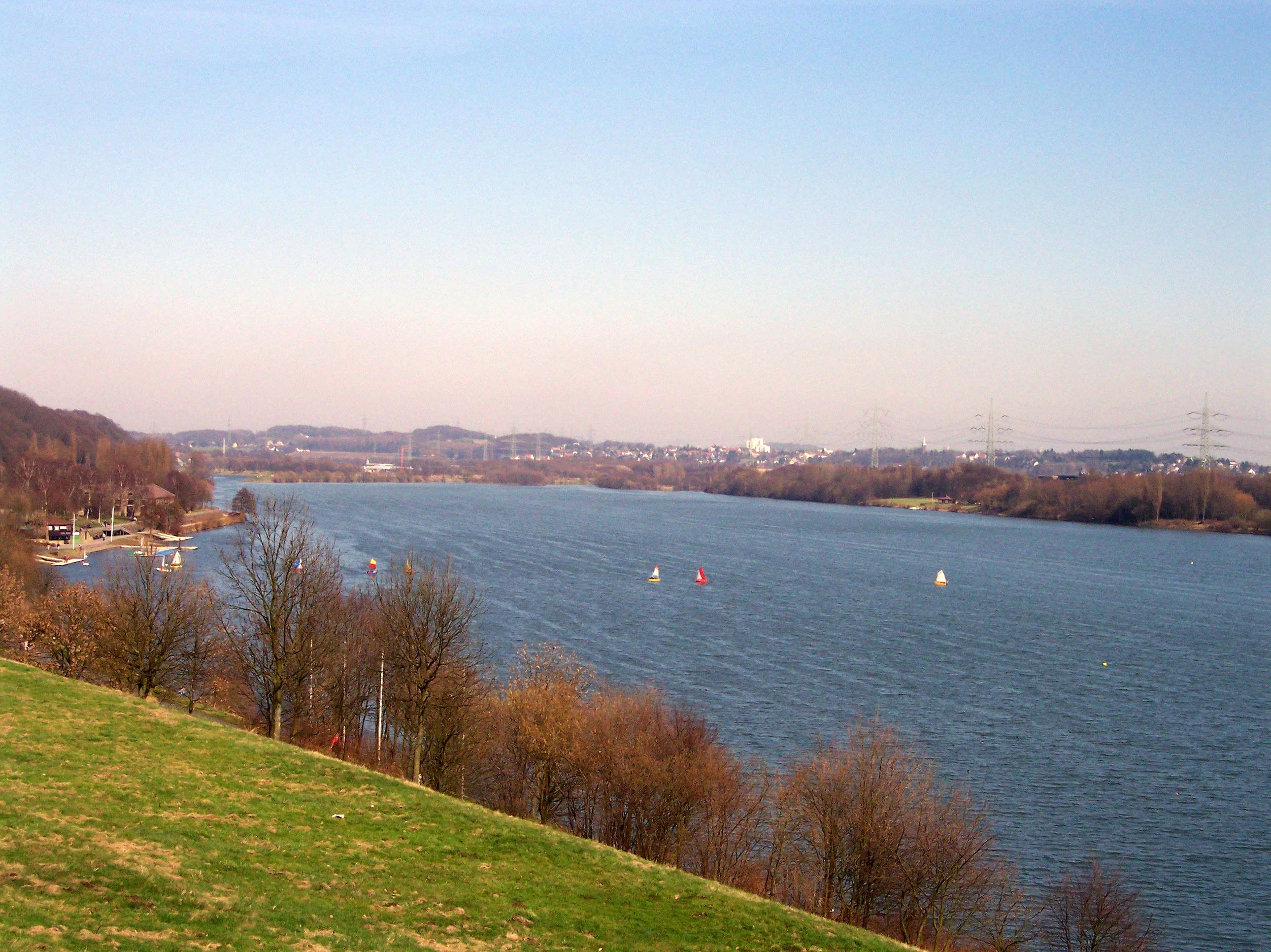
Kemnader Sea near Herbede

851: First mentioned as Villa Herribeddiu
1032: Building of St. Vitus, the first church
1208: First mention of Haus Herbede
1347: First mention of a bridge across the Ruhr
1589: Herbede becomes a part of Martin Luther's Reformation
1788: The first steel factory opens
1951: Herbede gains the right to name itself "city"
1975: Incorporation with Witten

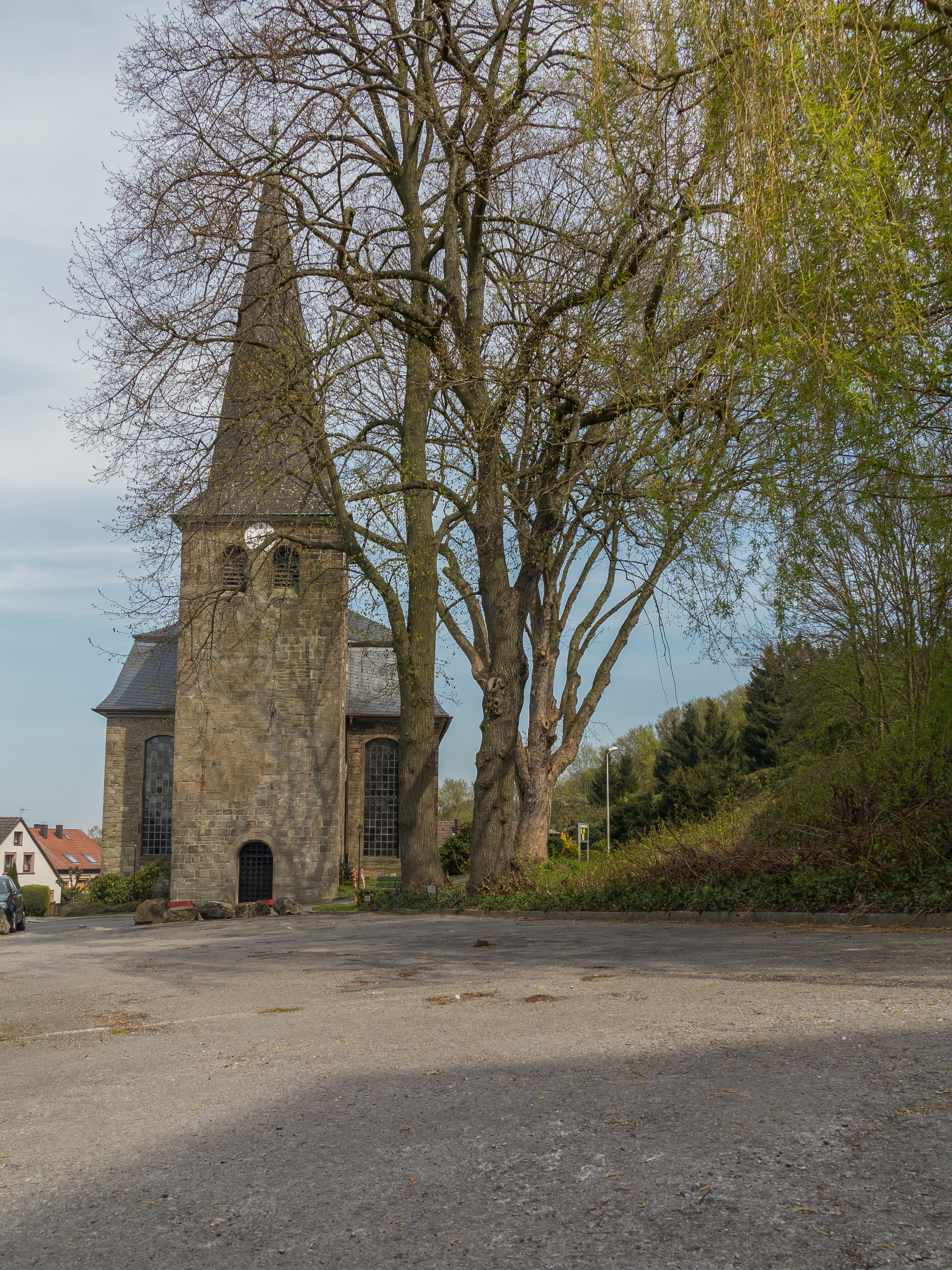
Reformed church

== City-districts ==
Herbede is divided into five city-districts:

- 81 Herbede-Ort
- 82 Vormholz
- 83 Bommerholz-Muttental
- 84 Durchholz
- 85 Kaempen and Buchholz

== Former boroughs ==
Before Herbede became a part of Witten, it had five boroughs: Vormholz, Bommerholz, Durchholz, Kaempen and Buchholz. They lost their status after the incorporation with Witten. The borough of Buchholz is thought to be one of the oldest communities in the entire Ruhr area. Historians believe that the first settlers came to Buchholz more than 2000 years ago.
