= Buchholz-Kämpen =

Coordinates: 51°24′01″N 7°15′48″E

Buchholz-Kämpen is a city-district of Witten-Herbede, which is a part of the city of Witten, North Rhine-Westphalia, Germany. Buchholz-Kämpen is located about 12 kilometres southeast of the city. As at 31 December 2015 the population of the district totalled 2,788.

== Buchholz ==
=== History ===
Buchholz is one of the oldest settlement places in the Ruhr valley. About 2000 years ago the first settlers came to the valley of Buchholz. Since the 19th century there has been a steel industry in Buchholz. Until the late 1920s there were also several coal mines.

==== Town of Blankenstein / Herbede / Witten ====
In its history Buchholz belonged to several counties. In 1966 it became a city-district of the newly founded city of Blankenstein. Just three years later the town of Blankenstein became a part of the city of Hattingen while Buchholz became a part of the city of Herbede. When Herbede was incorporated into Witten in 1975 Buchholz became part of the newly founded city-district Buchholz-Kämpen.

=== Curiosity ===
Because Buchholz had previously been part of Hattingen, it is assigned phone code 02324 (Hattingen) and not 02302 (Witten).

== Kämpen ==
Kämpen was founded in 1926.
