= Ralf Brauksiepe =

German politician (born 1967)

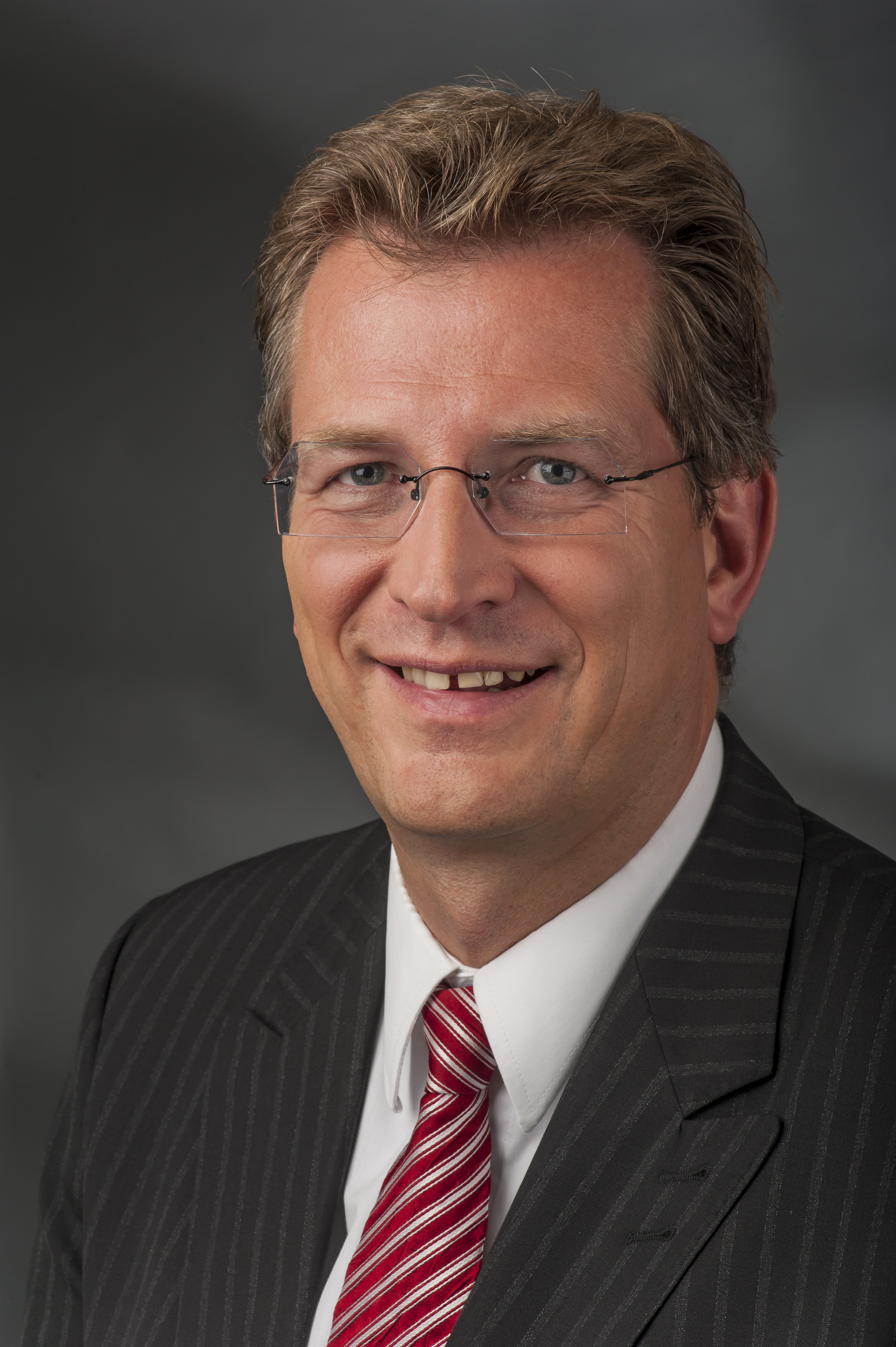

Member of the Bundestag
- In office 1998–2018

Personal details
- Born: 14 March 1967 (age 59) Hattingen, Northrhine-Westphalia
- Party: CDU
- Education: Ruhr University Bochum
- Profession: Economist
- Website: www.ralf-brauksiepe.de

Ralf Brauksiepe (born 14 March 1967) is a German politician of the Christian Democratic Union (CDU). Between 1998 and 2018, he served as a member of the Bundestag.

== Early life and education ==
Studying on a scholarship by the Konrad Adenauer Foundation, Brauksiepe earned a Diplom (1990) and a Doctorate (1995) in economics from the Ruhr University Bochum. Between 1996 and 1998 he was a research assistant in Bochum.

== Political career ==
Brauksiepe joined the CDU in 1983.

Between 2002 and 2005, Brauksiepe was the CDU/CSU parliamentary group's senior representative on the Committee on Economic Cooperation and Development and the Deputy Chairman of the Parliamentary Advisory Council on Sustainable Development. He also served as Deputy Chairman of the Parliamentary Friendship Group for Relations with the States of East Africa between 1998 and 2013.

=== Parliamentary State Secretary in the Federal Ministry for Labor and Social Affairs, 2009–2013 ===
In the negotiations to form a coalition government of the Christian Democrats (CDU together with the Bavarian CSU) and the Free Democratic Party (FDP) following the 2009 federal elections, Brauksiepe was part of the CDU/CSU delegation in the working group on labour and social affairs, led by Ronald Pofalla and Dirk Niebel. From October 2009 to December 2013, he then served as Parliamentary State Secretary in the Federal Ministry of Labour and Social Affairs under Ursula von der Leyen.

=== Parliamentary State Secretary in the Federal Ministry of Defense, 2013–2018 ===
Following the 2013 federal elections, Brauksiepe was part of the CDU/CSU team in the negotiations with the SPD on a coalition agreement. From December 2013 until March 2018, he served as Parliamentary State Secretary in the Federal Ministry of Defence, succeeding Christian Schmidt.

In this capacity, he focused on the areas covered by the directorates for policy, defense planning, forces policy, and strategy and operations, as well as those covered by the budget directorate. One of his most important tasks was representing the ministry before the Budget Committee of the Bundestag.

In addition, Brauksiepe served as Deputy Chairman of the Parliamentary Friendship Group for Relations with the Maghreb States (Algeria, Libya, Morocco, Mauretania, Tunisia).

In the coalition talks following the 2017 federal elections, Brauksiepe was part of the working group on social affairs, led by Karl-Josef Laumann, Barbara Stamm and Andrea Nahles.

=== Later career ===
After leaving government in March 2018, Brauksiepe was appointed to the Committee on Foreign Affairs. In addition to his committee assignments, he also served as the government's Commissioner for Patients' Affairs in the Federal Ministry of Health and chairman of the German-Egyptian Parliamentary Friendship Group. In November 2018, he resigned his parliamentary seat. He later joined the board of real estate company Vivawest in Essen.

== Other activities ==
- FC Schalke 04, Member of the UEFA Cup 2010 Final Bid Committee
- German Atlantic Association, Member of the Board
- German-Jordanian Society, Member of the advisory board (since 2006)
- German Orient Foundation, Member of the Board of Trustees
- Institute of Development Research and Development Policy (IEE) at the Ruhr University Bochum, Member of the Board of Trustees (since 2008)
- Otto Benecke Foundation, Member of the Board of Trustees (since 2012)
- German Civil Service Federation (DBB), Member
- Center for International Peace Operations (ZIF), ex-officio Member of the supervisory board (2014-2018)
- German Foundation for Peace Research, ex-officio Member of the Board (2014-2018)
- Federal Foundation for the Reappraisal of the SED Dictatorship, Ex-Officio Member of the Board of Trustees (2012-2018)
- action medeor, Member of the advisory board (2002-2006)
- Atlantic Association of Young Political Leaders (AAYPL), President (2007-2009)

== Visit to Incirlik Air Base ==
In June 2016, Turkey blocked a visit to Incirlik Air Base by Brauksiepe and other German lawmakers in a sign of tense relations between the two NATO allies at the time.
