= Ralf Kapschack =

German politician

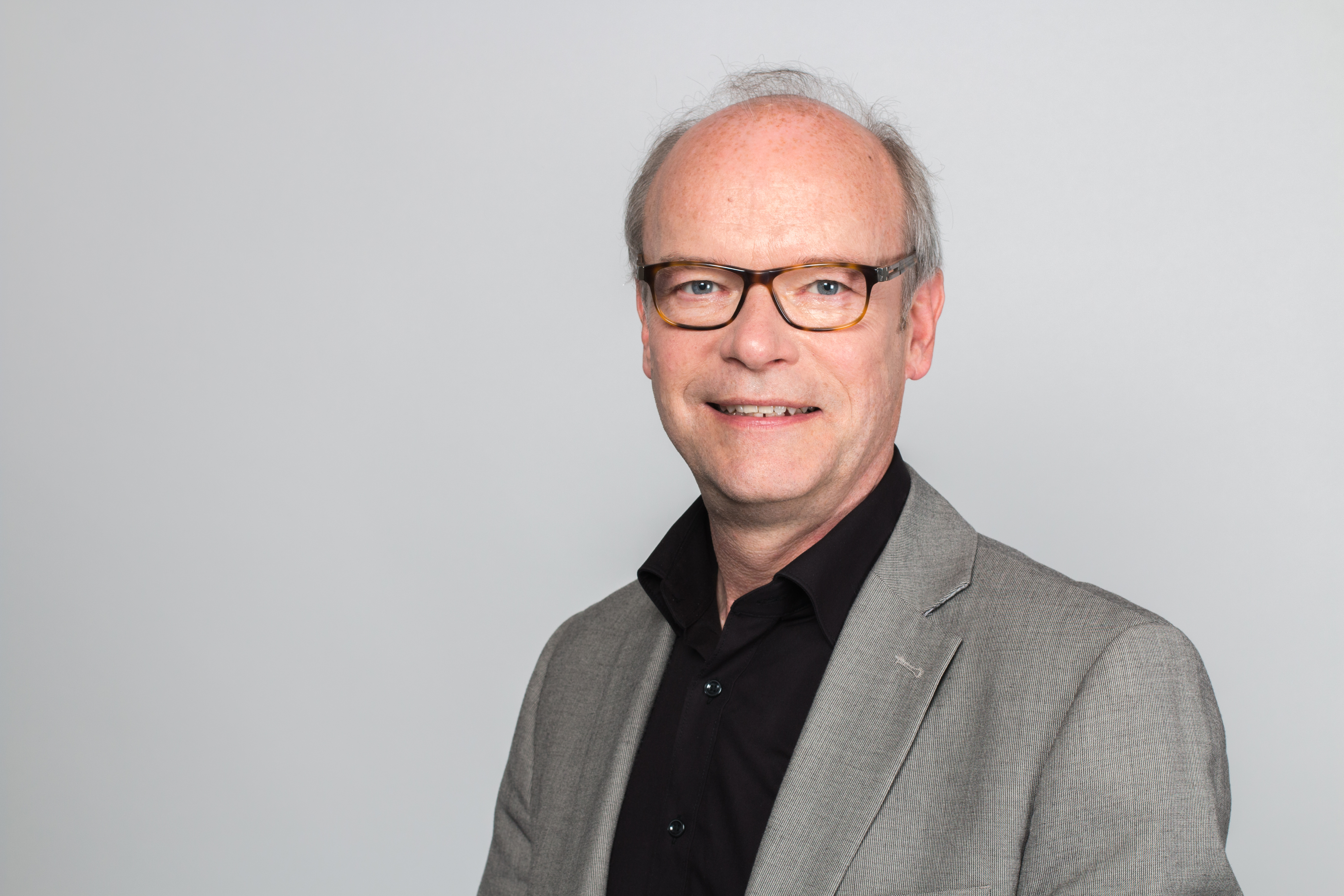
- Ralf Kapschack in 2014

Member of the Bundestag
- In office 2013–2021

Personal details
- Born: 24 December 1954 (age 71) Witten, West Germany (now Germany)
- Party: SPD
- Children: 2

Ralf Kapschack (born 24 December 1954) is a German politician of the Social Democratic Party (SPD) served as a member of the Bundestag from the state of North Rhine-Westphalia from 2013 to October 2021.

== Political career ==
Kapschack became a member of the Bundestag in the 2013 German federal election. He is a member of the Committee on Labour and Social Affairs and the Committee on Petitions.

In October 2020, Kapschack announced that he would not stand in the 2021 federal elections but instead resign from active politics by the end of the parliamentary term.
