= Katja Strauss-Köster =

Katja Strauss-Köster (born 19 August 1970) is a German politician of the Christian Democratic Union (CDU). From 2009 to 2025, she was the mayor of Herdecke. Since 2025, she has been a member of the Bundestag, the German federal parliament.

== Biography ==
Strauss-Köster graduated from the Friedrich-Harkort-Gymnasium in Herdecke in 1990. From 1990 to 1994, she studied spatial planning at the Technical University of Dortmund. After completing her studies, she worked as a research associate and earned her Doctor of Engineering degree in 1997. The topic of her dissertation was "City Networks – Expectations and Reality from an Ecological Perspective."

In 2001, she joined the city administration of Herdecke, working as an Agenda Officer. From 2005 onward, she served as the head of the Office for Sustainable Urban Development. During the 2009 mayoral election, she ran as an independent candidate supported by the so-called Jamaica coalition of the CDU, the Greens, and the FDP. With a voter turnout of 63.4%, she won 70.9% of the vote, defeating the SPD candidate Renate Drewke. She succeeded long-time SPD mayor Hans-Werner Koch.

In 2015, Strauss-Köster was re-elected with 64.36% of the votes, and in 2020, she secured her third term with 66.01%. Her opponent in both elections was Jan-Christoph Schaberick (SPD).

Katja Strauss-Köster is married and has a son and a daughter. Her son, Louis Köster, is a football player for FC Hansa Rostock.

On 6 June 2024 Strauss-Köster was nominated by the CDU district board of Ennepe-Ruhr-Kreis as the candidate for Bundestag constituency 138 (Ennepe-Ruhr-Kreis II) for the 21st German Bundestag election. She won and entered the Bundestag.

== See also ==
- 21st Bundestag
