= Witten =

- Town
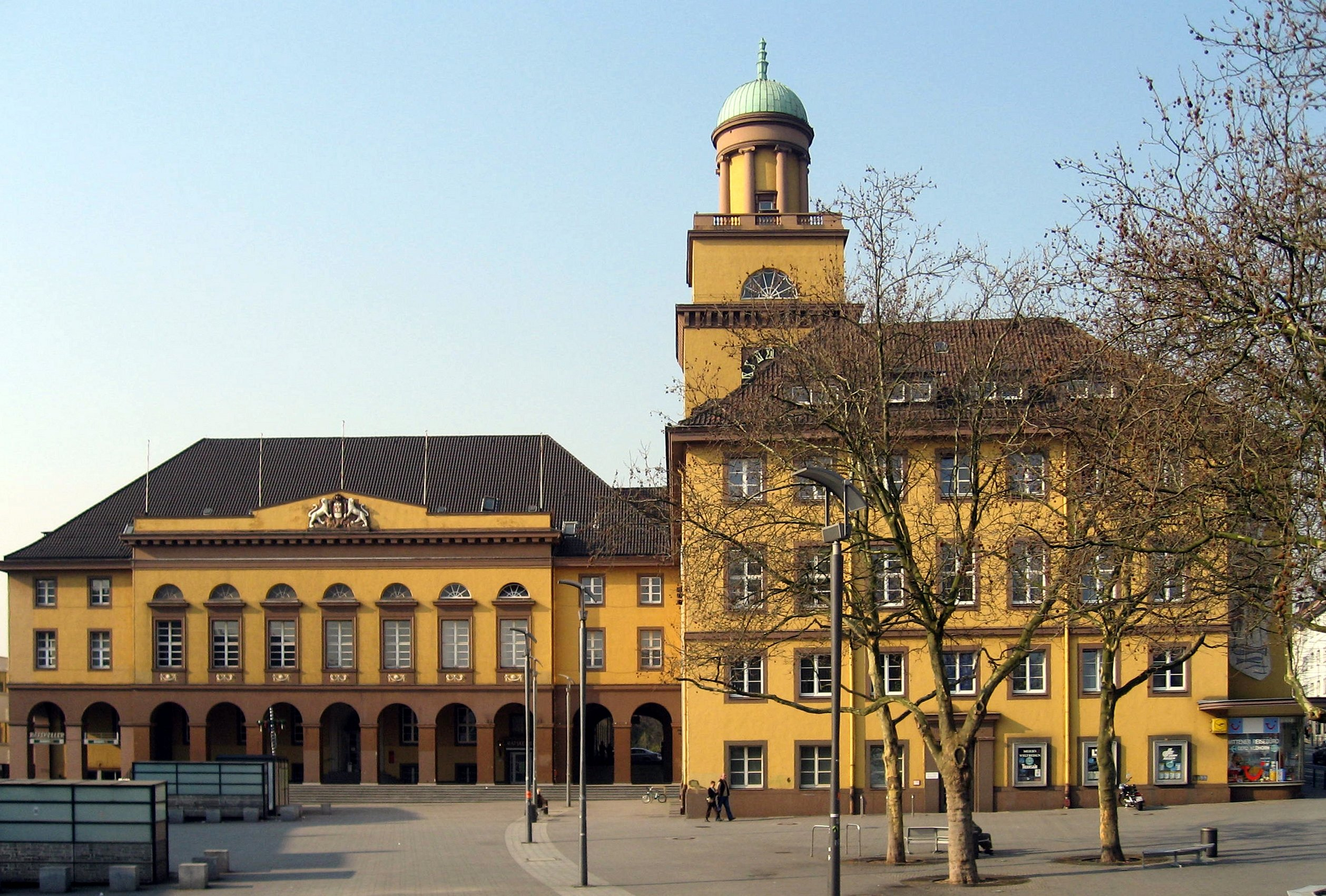
- Town hall in Witten

- Flag Coat of arms

- Location of Witten within Ennepe-Ruhr-Kreis district
- Interactive map of Witten
- Location within Germany Location within North Rhine-Westphalia
- Coordinates: 51°26′N 7°20′E
- Country: Germany
- State: North Rhine-Westphalia
- Admin. region: Arnsberg
- District: Ennepe-Ruhr-Kreis
- Subdivisions: 7 districts

Government
  - Mayor (2025–30): Dirk Leistner (SPD)

Area
  - Total: 72.4 km^{2} (28.0 sq mi)
- Elevation: 104 m (341 ft)

Population (2025-12-31)
  - Total: 91,474
  - Density: 1,260/km^{2} (3,270/sq mi)
- Time zone: UTC+01:00 (CET)
  - Summer (DST): UTC+02:00 (CEST)
- Postal codes: 58452 - 58456
- Dialling codes: 02302, 02324 (Buchholz)
- Vehicle registration: EN, WIT
- Website: witten.de

Witten (German pronunciation: [ˈvɪtn̩]) is a city with almost 100,000 inhabitants in the Ennepe-Ruhr-Kreis (district) in North Rhine-Westphalia, in western Germany.

== Geography ==
Witten is situated in the Ruhr valley, in the southern Ruhr area.

=== Bordering municipalities ===
- Bochum
- Dortmund
- Herdecke
- Wetter (Ruhr)
- Sprockhövel
- Hattingen

=== Boroughs ===
Witten is divided into eight boroughs and each borough is further divided into two or more city-districts. Every district has its own district-number:

- Witten-Mitte: 11 Innenstadt, 12 Oberdorf-Helenenberg, 13 Industriegebiet-West, 14 Krone, 15 Crengeldanz, 16 Hauptfriedhof, 17 Stadion, 18 Industriegebiet-Nord, 19 Hohenstein
- Düren: 21 Düren-Nord, 22 Düren-Sued
- Stockum: 31 Stockum-Mitte, 32 Dorney, 33 Stockumer Bruch, 34 Wilhelmshöhe
- Annen: 41 Tiefendorf, 42 Wullen, 43 Annen-Mitte-Nord, 44 Annen-Mitte-Süd, 45 Kohlensiepen, 46 Wartenberg, 47 Gedern
- Rüdinghausen: 51 Industriegebiet-Ost, 52 Rüdinghausen-Mitte, 53 Buchholz, 54 Schnee
- Bommern: 61 Steinhausen, 62 Bommerbank, 63 Bommerfeld, 64 Wettberg, 65 Buschey, 66 Bommeregge
- Heven: 71 Papenholz, 72 Hellweg, 73 Wannen, 74 Heven-Dorf, 75 Lake
- Herbede: 81 Herbede-Ort, 82 Vormholz, 83 Bommerholz-Muttental, 84 Durchholz, 85 Buchholz-Kaempen

== Population development ==
Historical population

| Year | Pop. | ±% p.a. |
|---|---|---|
| 1739 | 566 | — |
| 1787 | 690 | +0.41% |
| 1808 | 1,587 | +4.05% |
| 1830 | 2,210 | +1.52% |
| 1840 | 2,987 | +3.06% |
| 1855 | 5,112 | +3.65% |
| 1858 | 6,908 | +10.56% |
| 1864 | 10,500 | +7.23% |
| 1867 | 12,200 | +5.13% |
| 1871 | 15,161 | +5.58% |
| 1875 | 18,100 | +4.53% |
| 1880 | 21,600 | +3.60% |
| 1885 | 23,879 | +2.03% |
| 1890 | 26,310 | +1.96% |
| 1895 | 28,769 | +1.80% |
| 1900 | 33,517 | +3.10% |
| 1905 | 35,841 | +1.35% |
| 1910 | 37,450 | +0.88% |
| 1916 | 34,864 | −1.19% |
| 1919 | 37,441 | +2.41% |

| Year | Pop. | ±% p.a. |
|---|---|---|
| 1925 | 45,519 | +3.31% |
| 1933 | 72,580 | +6.01% |
| 1939 | 73,365 | +0.18% |
| 1946 | 69,384 | −0.79% |
| 1950 | 76,312 | +2.41% |
| 1956 | 91,706 | +3.11% |
| 1961 | 96,462 | +1.02% |
| 1965 | 112,130 | +3.83% |
| 1970 | 112,840 | +0.13% |
| 1975 | 108,777 | −0.73% |
| 1980 | 105,887 | −0.54% |
| 1985 | 102,262 | −0.69% |
| 1990 | 105,403 | +0.61% |
| 1995 | 104,754 | −0.12% |
| 2000 | 103,196 | −0.30% |
| 2005 | 100,793 | −0.47% |
| 2010 | 98,233 | −0.51% |
| 2015 | 96,700 | −0.31% |
| 2020 | 95,876 | −0.17% |
| 2025 | 91,474 | −0.94% |

Source: Landesdatabank Nordrhein-Westfalen (1965-2025)

== History ==
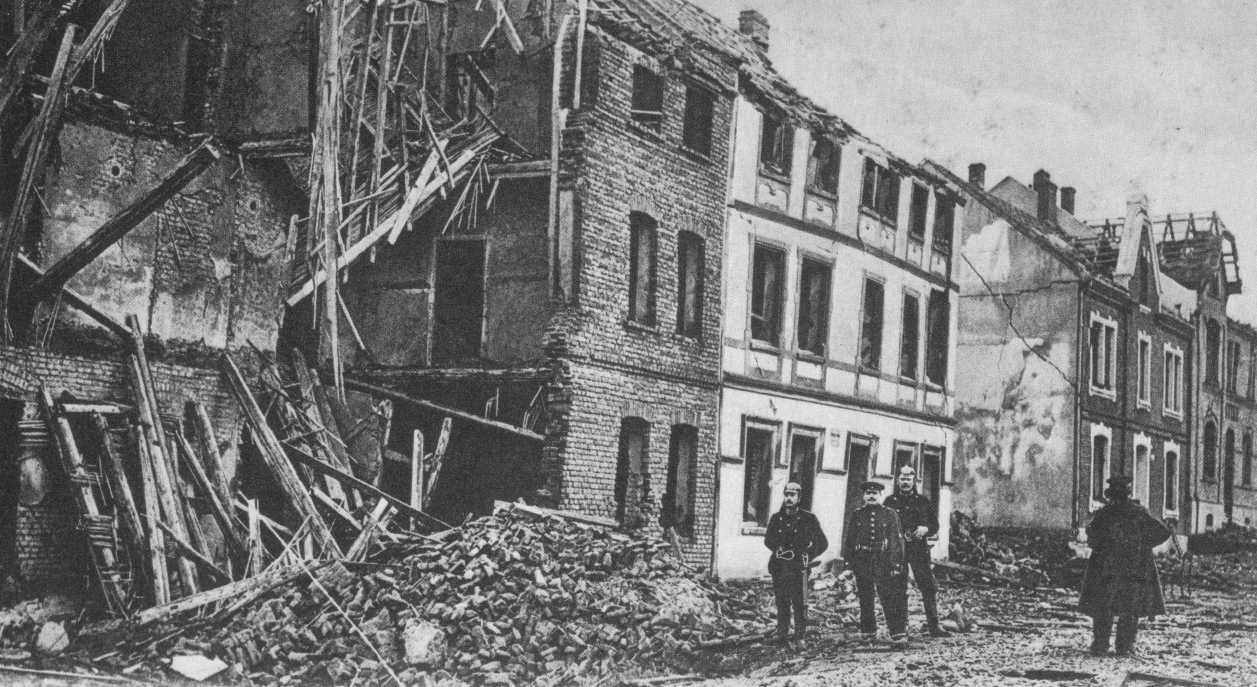
The Roburit Explosion in 1906

Witten was first mentioned in historic sources in 1214, however the borough Herbede (which was incorporated into the city in 1975) dates back to 851. The city was a mining town from 1578.

In the late 19th century Witten was known for the Roburit dynamite. This dynamite was once used by coal mines around the world. In 1906 an explosion occurred, resulting in the deaths of 41 people.

During World War II, forced laborers of the 3rd SS construction brigade were dispatched in the town by the Nazis in 1943.

In 1946, it was included in North Rhine-Westphalia on its establishment. In 1975 Witten was included in the administrative district Ennepe-Ruhr-Kreis and it is now its biggest city. 1975 was also the year Witten was first counted to have more than 100,000 inhabitants, the threshold to be considered a large city ("Großstadt") in Germany.

== Politics ==
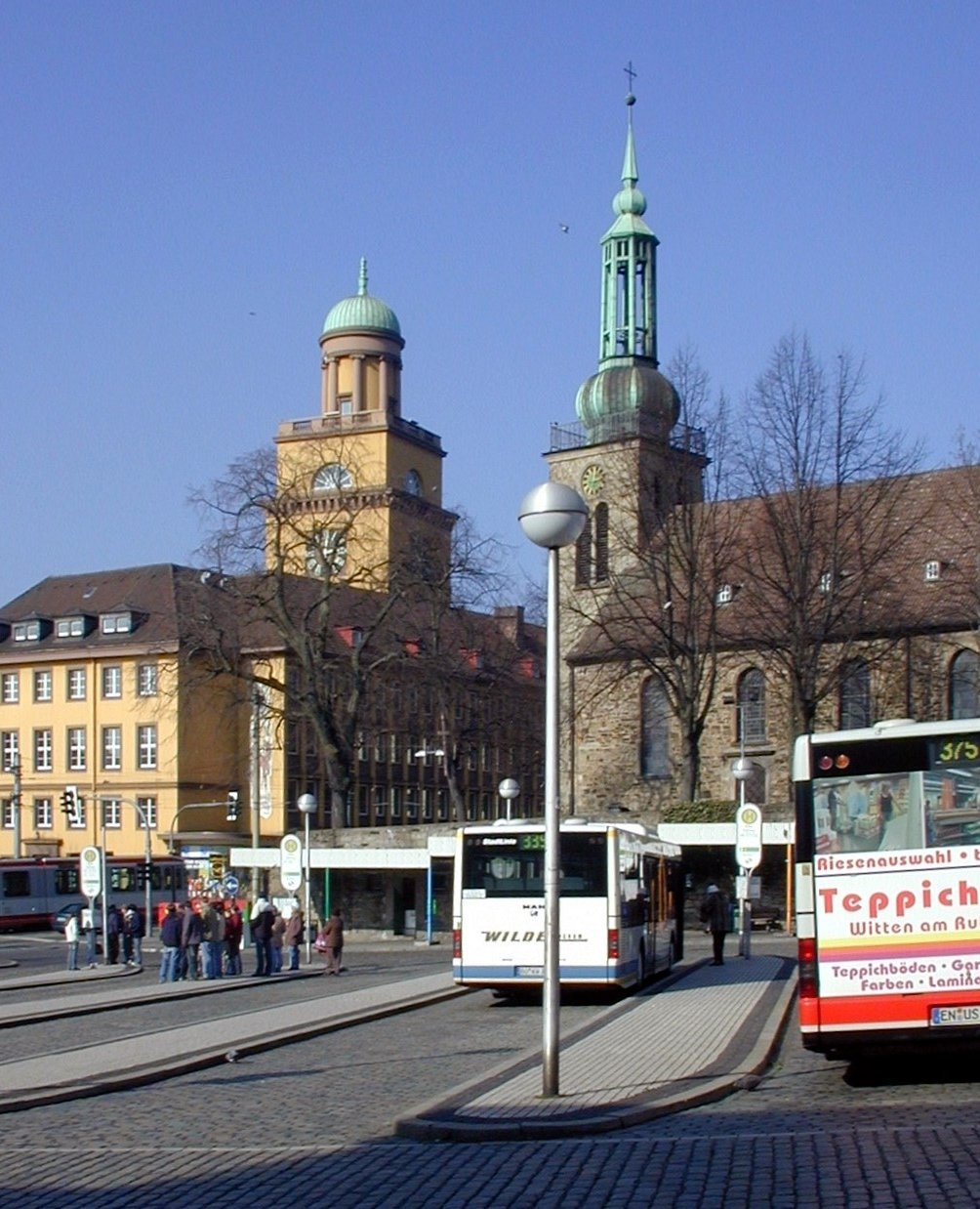
Townhall and Johannis-Church

In the local elections of 2004 the Social Democratic Party (SPD) was the largest party on the council with 24 seats. It was followed by the Christian Democratic Union (CDU) with 18 and the Alliance 90/The Greens with 7, the WBG (a conservative lis) and Free Democrats with four each, FLW (also a conservative list) with three, National Democratic Party two, and the PDS/WAL (socialists) and AUF Witten (a left wing list) with one each.

From 2004 to 2020, for the first time in its history, the council was led by a female mayor: Sonja Leidemann (SPD). In the election of 2020 she lost her mandate to Lars König (CDU).

=== Mayor ===
The current mayor of Witten is Dirk Leistner of the Social Democratic Party of Germany (SPD). The most recent mayoral election was held on 14 September 2025.

Previous municipal elections was held on 13 September 2020, with a runoff held on 27 September, and the results were as follows:

| Candidate | Party | First round | | Second round | |
| Candidate | Party | Votes | % | Votes | % |
|---|---|---|---|---|---|
| Sonja Leidemann | Social Democratic Party | 12,365 | 34.5 | 11,365 | 40.0 |
| Lars König | Christian Democratic Union | 10,595 | 29.6 | 17,036 | 60.0 |
| Stefan Borggraefe | Pirate Party Germany | 4,005 | 11.2 | | |
| Martin Strautz | Citizens' Forum | 2,276 | 6.4 | | |
| Ursula Weiß | The Left | 2,227 | 6.2 | | |
| Richard Surrey | Witten Citizen's Association/Free Voters | 1,793 | 5.0 | | |
| Michael Hasenkamp | CityClimate Witten | 1,110 | 3.1 | | |
| Hans-Peter Skotarzik | Witten.Direct | 1,052 | 2.9 | | |
| Norman Kerner | Independent | 397 | 1.1 | | |
| Valid votes | | 35,820 | 98.1 | 28,401 | 98.7 |
| Invalid votes | | 709 | 1.9 | 369 | 1.3 |
| Total | | 36,529 | 100.0 | 28,770 | 100.0 |
| Electorate/voter turnout | | 78,110 | 46.8 | 77,920 | 36.9 |
Source: City of Witten (1st round, 2nd round)

=== City council ===
Results of the 2020 city council election.

The Witten city council governs the city alongside the Mayor. The most recent city council election was held on 13 September 2020, and the results were as follows:

| Party | Votes | % | +/- | Seats | +/- |
|---|---|---|---|---|---|
| Social Democratic Party (SPD) | 9,052 | 25.2 | ▼10.0 | 16 | ▼9 |
| Christian Democratic Union (CDU) | 8,349 | 23.2 | ▼0.3 | 15 | ▼2 |
| Alliance 90/The Greens (Grüne) | 7,404 | 20.6 | ▲7.6 | 13 | ▲4 |
| Citizens' Forum (BF) | 2,182 | 6.1 | ▼4.4 | 4 | ▼3 |
| Alternative for Germany (AfD) | 1,681 | 4.7 | New | 3 | New |
| Pirate Party Germany (Piraten) | 1,536 | 4.3 | ▲2.2 | 3 | ▲1 |
| The Left (Die Linke) | 1,441 | 4.0 | ▼2.0 | 3 | ▼1 |
| Witten Citizens' Association/Free Voters (WGB-FW) | 1,120 | 3.1 | ▲0.9 | 2 | ±0 |
| Free Democratic Party (FDP) | 838 | 2.3 | ▲0.1 | 2 | ±0 |
| Die PARTEI | 739 | 2.1 | New | 1 | New |
| CityClimate Witten (SKW) | 631 | 1.8 | New | 1 | New |
| Witten.Direct (W.D) | 535 | 1.5 | New | 1 | New |
| Alternative Independent Progressive Witten (AUF) | 227 | 0.6 | ▼0.6 | 0 | ▼1 |
| Ecological Democratic Party (ÖDP) | 139 | 0.4 | New | 0 | New |
| Grassroots Democratic List Witten (BLW) | 87 | 0.2 | New | 0 | New |
| Independent Norman Kerner | 13 | 0.0 | New | 0 | New |
| Valid votes | 35,974 | 98.5 | | | |
| Invalid votes | 547 | 1.5 | | | |
| Total | 36,521 | 100.0 | | 64 | ▼8 |
| Electorate/voter turnout | 78,108 | 46.8 | ▼0.4 | | |
Source: City of Witten

=== State Landtag ===
In the Landtag of North Rhine-Westphalia, Witten is part of the Ennepe-Ruhr-Kreis II constituency. Nadja Büteführ of the SPD was elected as representative in the 2017 state election. Verena Schäffer of the Greens also ran in the constituency and was elected to the Landtag on her party's state list.

=== Federal parliament ===
In the Bundestag, Witten is part of the Ennepe-Ruhr-Kreis II constituency. Axel Echeverria of the SPD was elected as representative in the 2021 German federal election.

== Transport ==
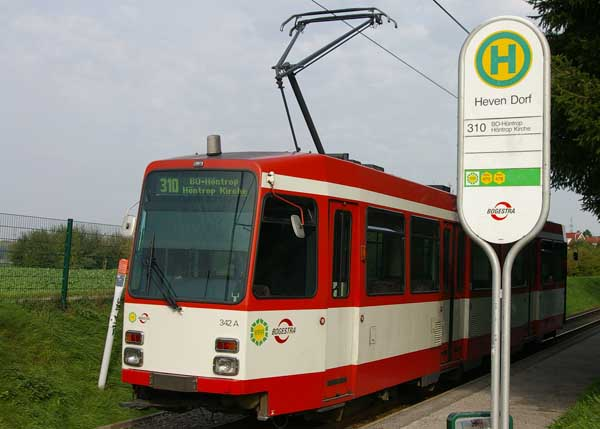
Tram in Witten-Heven

Witten is connected to the Autobahn network by the A 43 and A 44 motorways. It has a central station, connecting the city to the regional-train-network of Deutsche Bahn with direct connections to Hagen, Bochum, Essen, Siegen, Wuppertal, Düsseldorf, Aachen or Dortmund. Local service is carried out by the BOGESTRA, a joint venture between the cities of Bochum and Gelsenkirchen, to which most of the bus lines in Witten belong. There is a tram line connecting to Bochum. From mid-December on, there will be two tram lines, which will run in Witten (lines 309 and 310). When the new track to Langendreer is completed (September 2020), the tram lines will ride to the station of Bochum-Langendreer (309) or to Wattenscheid-Höntrop via Bochum main station (310). Public transport in the city is carried out according to the fare system of the VRR transport association.

== Coat of arms ==
The coat of arms of Witten with its two lions once belong to the Everhards von Witten-Steinhausen and was first mentioned in 1283. The family of Witten-Steinhausen belongs to the founders of the town of Witten. Their slogan was: "Sigillum Hermanni de Wittene". Because of its long history this coat of arms was the only one in the Ruhr area, that was not forbidden by the Allies in May 1945, after the end of the Second World War.

== Culture ==
- Hebezeug-Museum – a museum dedicated to cranes and hoist founded by J. D. Neuhaus and is located on the Route der Industriekultur.
- Wittener Tage für neue Kammermusik, festival for contemporary chamber music, held annually at the end of April
- Märkisches Museum (Witten)

== Twin towns – sister cities ==
Witten is twinned with:

- Beauvais, France (1975)
- Barking and Dagenham, England, United Kingdom (1979)
- Mallnitz, Austria (1979)
- Lev HaSharon, Israel (1979)
- Bitterfeld-Wolfen, Germany (1990)
- Kursk, Russia (1990)
- Tczew, Poland (1990)
- San Carlos, Nicaragua (1990)
- Mekelle, Ethiopia (2016)

== Religions ==
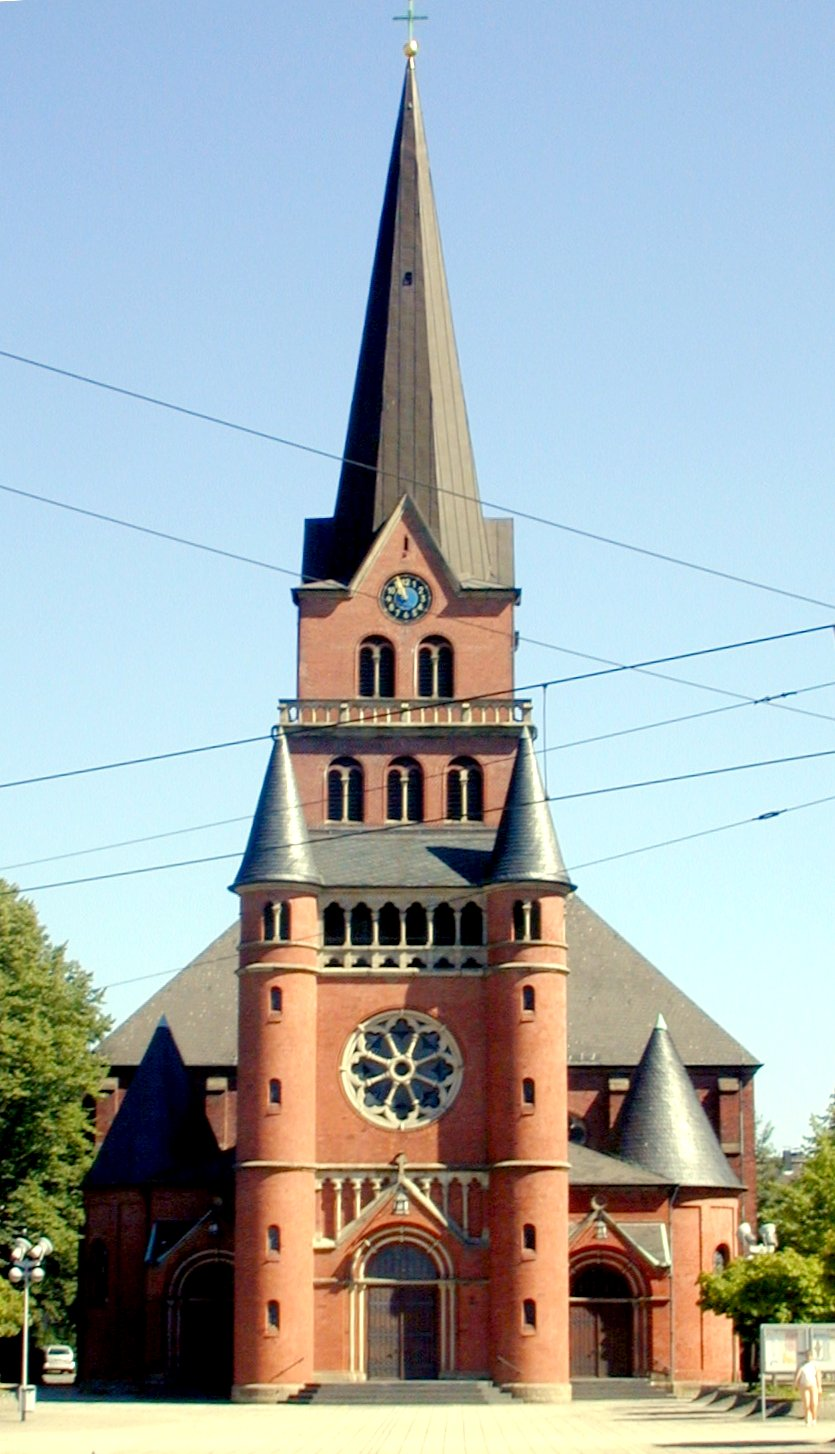
St. Maria Church

=== Roman Catholic ===
When Witten was first mentioned in historical documents, it was part of the Archdiocese of Cologne. Since 1821 it has been a part of the Diocese of Paderborn; however, the borough of Herbede belongs to the Diocese of Essen. In the 19th century the Ruhr area drew up to 500,000 Poles from East Prussia and Silesia, most of whom were Catholic. Hundreds settled in Witten, leading to a growth in the Catholic community. Today, between 30 and 40 per cent of the population is Catholic.

=== Protestant ===
In the 16th century Witten was influenced by Martin Luther's Reformation, and until the late 19th century, Witten was a predominantly Protestant town with just a few Catholic inhabitants. Between 30 and 40 per cent of the population is Protestant today.

=== Muslims ===
There are four mosques in Witten, Annen and Herbede today, founded by immigrants from Turkey who arrived in the 1970s and 1980s. Between five and eight per cent of the population is Muslim.

=== Jews ===
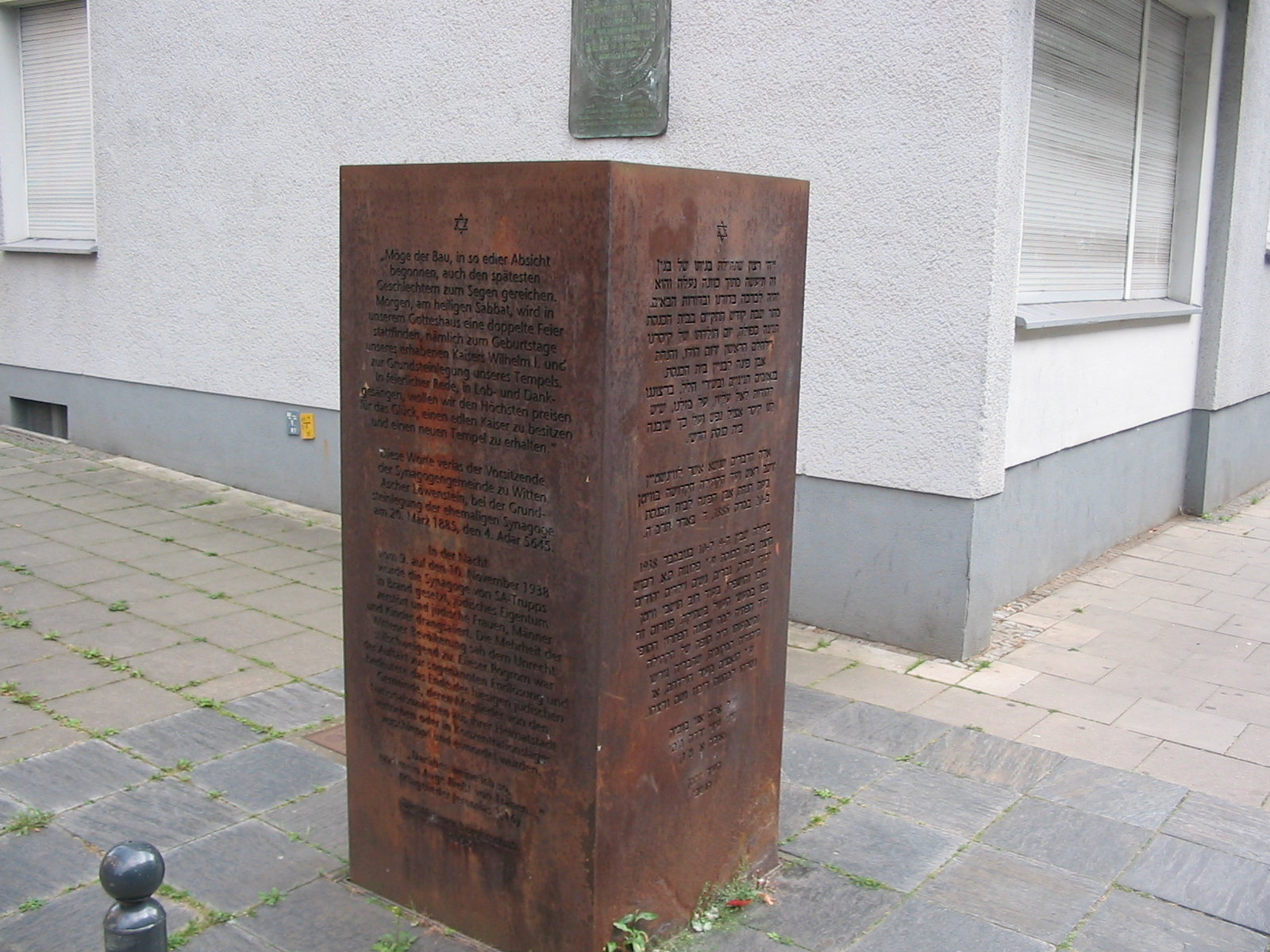
Memorial at the place of the former synagogue

In 1815 the first Jewish community was mentioned in Witten. In 1938 the synagogue was destroyed during the so-called "Reichspogromnacht" (also known as Kristallnacht) of 9–10 November 1938. Today, only about a dozen Jews live in Witten. They belong to the Jewish community in Dortmund.

Since 1994 the place of the former synagogue is marked with a memorial.

== Notable people ==
- Ingeborg Danz (born 1961), concert singer
- Theodor Detmers (1902–1976), officer
- Felix Dornebusch (born 1994), football player
- Mirko Englich (born 1978), wrestler
- Dennis Eilhoff (born 1982), football player
- Robert Graf (1923–1966), actor
- Martin Geck (1936–2019), musicologist
- Ralf Kapschack (born 1954), politician (SPD)
- Carsten Keuler (born 1971), football player
- Nadja Lüders (born 1974), politician
- Jochen Nickel (born 1959), actor
- Sorina Nwachukwu (born 1987), sprinter
- Paul Pleiger (1899–1985), industrialist and corporate executive (NSDAP)
- Alexandra Popp (born 1991), football player
- Andreas Reckwitz (born 1970), sociologist
- Stephan Remmler (born 1949), singer
- Moritz Römling (born 2001), football player
- Otto Schlüter (1872–1959), geographer
- Joseph Schmidt-Görg (1897–1981), musicologist and composer
- Otto Schott (1851–1935), chemist
- Erich Schöppner (1932–2005), boxer
- Michael Schulz (born 1961), football player
- Josef Sieber (1900–1962), film actor
- Wilhelm Utermann (1912–1991), writer and journalist
- Willi Veller (1896–1941), politician (NSDAP)
- Tanja Wedhorn (born 1971), actress
- Charles Paul Wilp (1932–2005), artist and photographer
- Rosi Wolfstein (1888–1987), politician (KPD)
