= Sprockhövel =

- Town
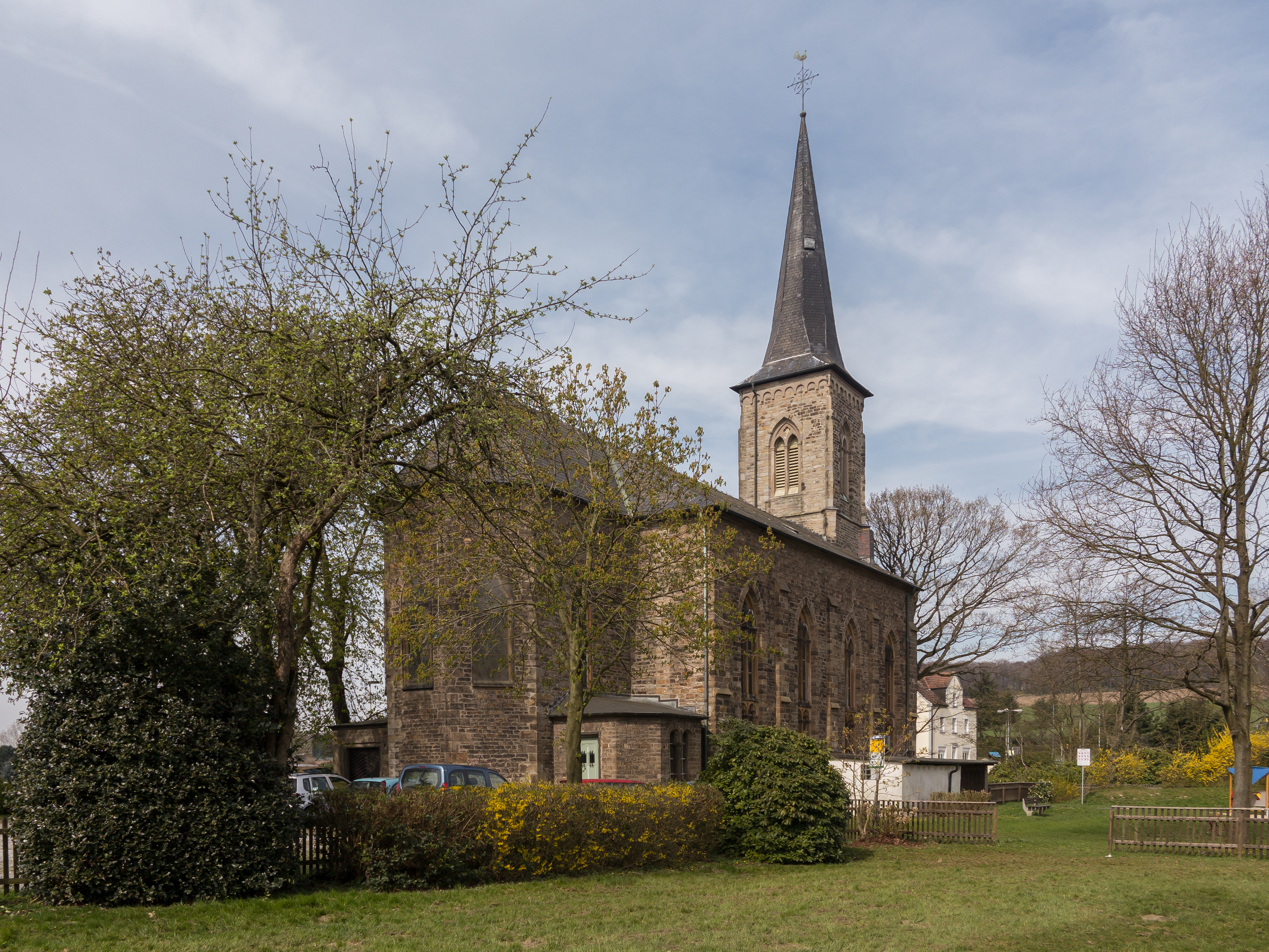
- Gennebreck, reformed church: Kirche Herzkamp

- Flag Coat of arms

- Location of Sprockhövel within Ennepe-Ruhr-Kreis district
- Interactive map of Sprockhövel
- Location within Germany Location within North Rhine-Westphalia
- Coordinates: 51°22′N 7°15′E
- Country: Germany
- State: North Rhine-Westphalia
- Admin. region: Arnsberg
- District: Ennepe-Ruhr-Kreis
- Subdivisions: 11

Government
  - Mayor (2020–25): Sabine Noll (CDU)

Area
  - Total: 47.94 km^{2} (18.51 sq mi)
- Elevation: 219 m (719 ft)

Population (2025-12-31)
  - Total: 24,116
  - Density: 503.0/km^{2} (1,303/sq mi)
- Time zone: UTC+01:00 (CET)
  - Summer (DST): UTC+02:00 (CEST)
- Postal codes: 45549
- Dialling codes: 02339, 02324, 0202
- Vehicle registration: EN
- Website: www.sprockhoevel.de

Sprockhövel (German pronunciation: [ˈʃpʁɔkˌhøːfl̩]) is a town in the district of Ennepe-Ruhr-Kreis, North Rhine-Westphalia, Germany.

== Geography ==
Sprockhövel is located in the southern suburban part of the Ruhr area. It is 6 km (3.7 mi) southeast of Hattingen, 8 km (5.0 mi) northwest of Gevelsberg, 13 km (8.1 mi) south of Bochum and 14 km (8.7 mi) northeast of Wuppertal.

The town consists of the Stadtteile Gennebreck, Haßlinghausen, Hiddinghausen, Niedersprockhövel, Niederstüter and Obersprockhövel.

== History ==
The town was first mentioned in documents around 1000 AD. It was part of the County of Mark, but close to the Duchy of Berg, whose cultural influence is still visible today in the historical part of town. The current administration of Sprockhövel is a result of the local government reform on 1 January 1975.

Sprockhövel is twinned with South Kirkby, West Yorkshire.

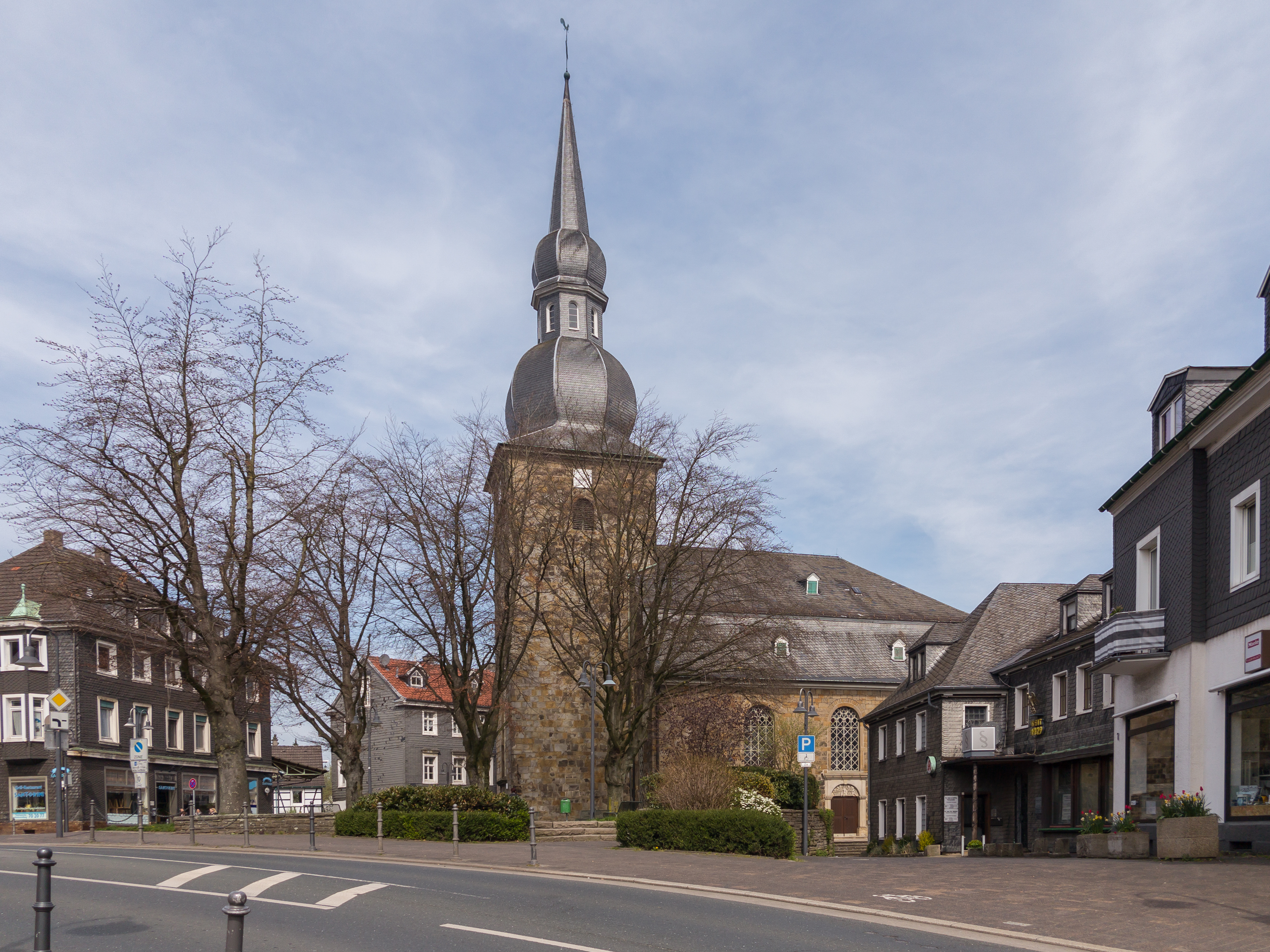
Niedersprockhövel, reformed church

== Population ==
Historical population

| Year | Pop. | ±% p.a. |
|---|---|---|
| 1965 | 20,696 | — |
| 1970 | 21,911 | +1.15% |
| 1975 | 24,171 | +1.98% |
| 1980 | 24,359 | +0.16% |
| 1985 | 23,896 | −0.38% |
| 1990 | 24,505 | +0.50% |
| 1995 | 25,442 | +0.75% |

| Year | Pop. | ±% p.a. |
|---|---|---|
| 2000 | 26,454 | +0.78% |
| 2005 | 26,132 | −0.24% |
| 2010 | 25,408 | −0.56% |
| 2015 | 25,205 | −0.16% |
| 2020 | 24,702 | −0.40% |
| 2025 | 24,116 | −0.48% |

Source: Landesdatabank Nordrhein-Westfalen

== Politics ==
The current mayor of Sprockhövel is Sabine Noll, an independent endorsed by the CDU and Greens, since 2020. In the most recent mayoral election on 13 September 2020, Noll won with 57.9% of votes against Volker Hoven, who was supported by the SPD, FDP, and WfS-FW.

=== List of mayors ===
- Hans Käseberg (SPD) 1970–1999
- Paul Gerhard Flasdieck (SPD) 1999–2004
- Klaus Walterscheid (SPD) (* 1946), 2004–2014
- Ulrich Winkelmann (* 1957), 2014-2020
- Sabine Noll (* 1968), since 2020

=== City council ===
Results of the 2020 city council election

The Sprockhövel city council governs the city alongside the Mayor. The most recent city council election was held on 13 September 2020, and the results were as follows:

| Party | Votes | % | +/- | Seats | +/- |
|---|---|---|---|---|---|
| Christian Democratic Union (CDU) | 4,040 | 31.8 | ▲2.4 | 12 | ±0 |
| Social Democratic Party (SPD) | 3,384 | 26.6 | ▼11.5 | 10 | ▼6 |
| Alliance 90/The Greens (Grüne) | 3,148 | 24.8 | ▲12.0 | 10 | ▲5 |
| Free Democratic Party (FDP) | 1,113 | 8.8 | ▲0.2 | 3 | ±0 |
| We for Sprockhövel–Free Voters (WfS–FW) | 607 | 4.8 | ▼0.9 | 2 | ±0 |
| Together in Sprockhövel (MiS) | 427 | 3.4 | New | 1 | New |
| Valid votes | 12,719 | 98.1 | | | |
| Invalid votes | 250 | 1.9 | | | |
| Total | 12,969 | 100.0 | | 38 | ▼2 |
| Electorate/voter turnout | 21,162 | 61.3 | | | |
Source: City of Sprockhövel

== Notable people ==
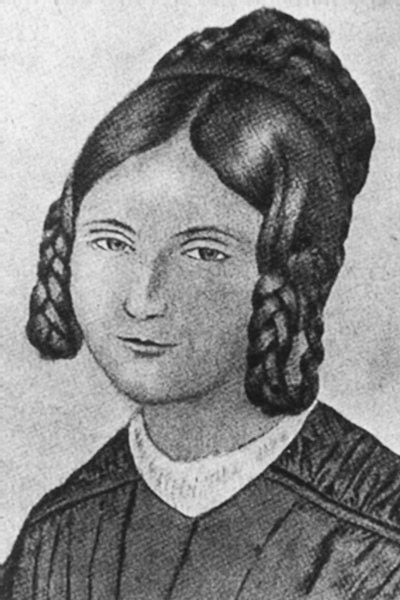
Mathilde Franziska Anneke (about 1840)

- Mathilde Franziska Anneke (1817–1884), women's rights activist
- Henriette Davidis (1801–1876), house economist and author
- Dietrich Grönemeyer (born 1952), physician and brother of Herbert Grönemeyer
- Jay Mo Härtling (born 2002), racing driver
- Dirk Schrade (born 1978), versatile rider, has been living in the Haßlinghausen district since 2009
- Erwin Sellering (born 1949), Minister President of Mecklenburg-Vorpommern since 2008 (SPD)

== See also ==
- Dampf-Bahn-Club Sprockhövel, a miniature railway in Sprockhövel.
- TSG Sprockhövel, local football club
