= Hohenlimburg station =

Railway station in Hohenlimburg, Germany

Hohenlimburg
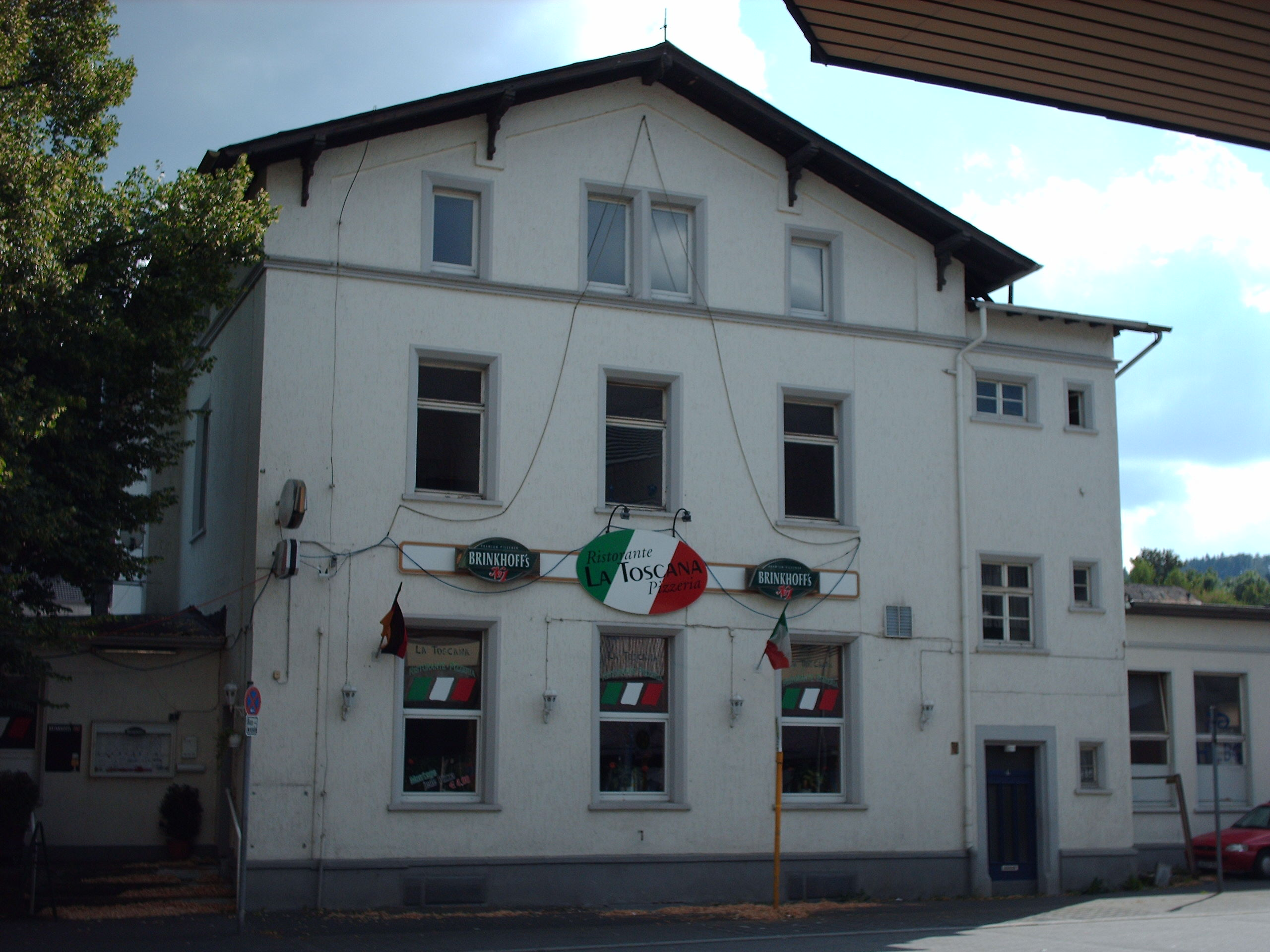
- The former station building

General information
- Location: Bahnstraße 4, Hagen-Hohenlimburg, NRW; Germany
- Coordinates: 51°20′56″N 7°34′18″E
- Line: Ruhr–Sieg railway
- Platforms: 2

Construction
- Accessible: Platform 1 only

Other information
- Station code: 2851
- DS100 code: EHOG
- IBNR: 8002953
- Category: 5
- Fare zone: VRR: 584
- Website: www.bahnhof.de

History
- Opened: 21 March 1859

Services
Preceding station	VIAS	Following station
Hagen Hbf towards Essen Hbf	RE 16	Iserlohn-Letmathe towards Iserlohn
Hagen Hbf Terminus	RB 91	Iserlohn-Letmathe towards Siegen
Location

Hagen-Hohenlimburg station is the only station in the Hohenlimburg district of Hagen in the German state of North Rhine-Westphalia. It is on the Ruhr–Sieg railway and classified by Deutsche Bahn as a category 5 station.

== Location ==
The station is located on the edge of central Hohenlimburg. Directly across the street is the bus station, which is the starting point of bus services of the Hagener Straßenbahn and Märkische Verkehrsgesellschaft companies towards central Hagen, Iserlohn, Hemer and Nachrodt-Wiblingwerde. At the end of the platform there was a level crossing, which, however, has been replaced by a new bridge.

== History ==
Until well into the 20th century the station was of great importance to the steel industry in Hohenlimburg. In the past the Hohenlimburg Light Railway (German: Hohenlimburger Kleinbahn) connected the textile and wire-making factories in the valley of the Nahmerbach to the station. It ceased operations in 1983. Until a few years ago there was a freight platform next to the passenger platform, which has now been demolished. In 2011, major reconstruction began in the station area and consequently the station building and the connection to the parking garage above the bus station were demolished and a roundabout was established in front of the station. In addition, a main platform was built with direct access to the bus stop. The station was officially opened on 24 August 2012.

== Operations ==
Currently, the station is served by two lines, Regional-Express service RE 16 (Ruhr-Lenne-Express) from Essen via Hagen to Siegen or Iserlohn and Regionalbahn service RB 91 (Ruhr-Sieg-Bahn) from Hagen to Iserlohn. Both lines have operated since 2022 by DB Regio NRW. Passengers on RB 91 trains need to change at Iserlohn-Letmathe station to continue to Iserlohn. Hohenlimburg is the last station owned by Verkehrsverbund Rhein-Ruhr (Rhine-Ruhr Transport Association) before the border with the Verkehrsgemeinschaft Ruhr-Lippe (Ruhr-Lippe Transport Company) area.

Line	Line name	Route	Frequency
RE 16	Ruhr-Lenne-Express	Essen – Bochum – Witten – Hagen – Hohenlimburg – Iserlohn-Letmathe – Iserlohn	60 min
RB 91	Ruhr-Sieg-Bahn	Hagen – Hohenlimburg – Iserlohn-Letmathe – Finnentrop – Siegen / Iserlohn	60 min

Several regional bus lines operate from the central bus station.
