= Dortmund-Barop station =

Railway station in Dortmund, Germany

Dortmund Barop
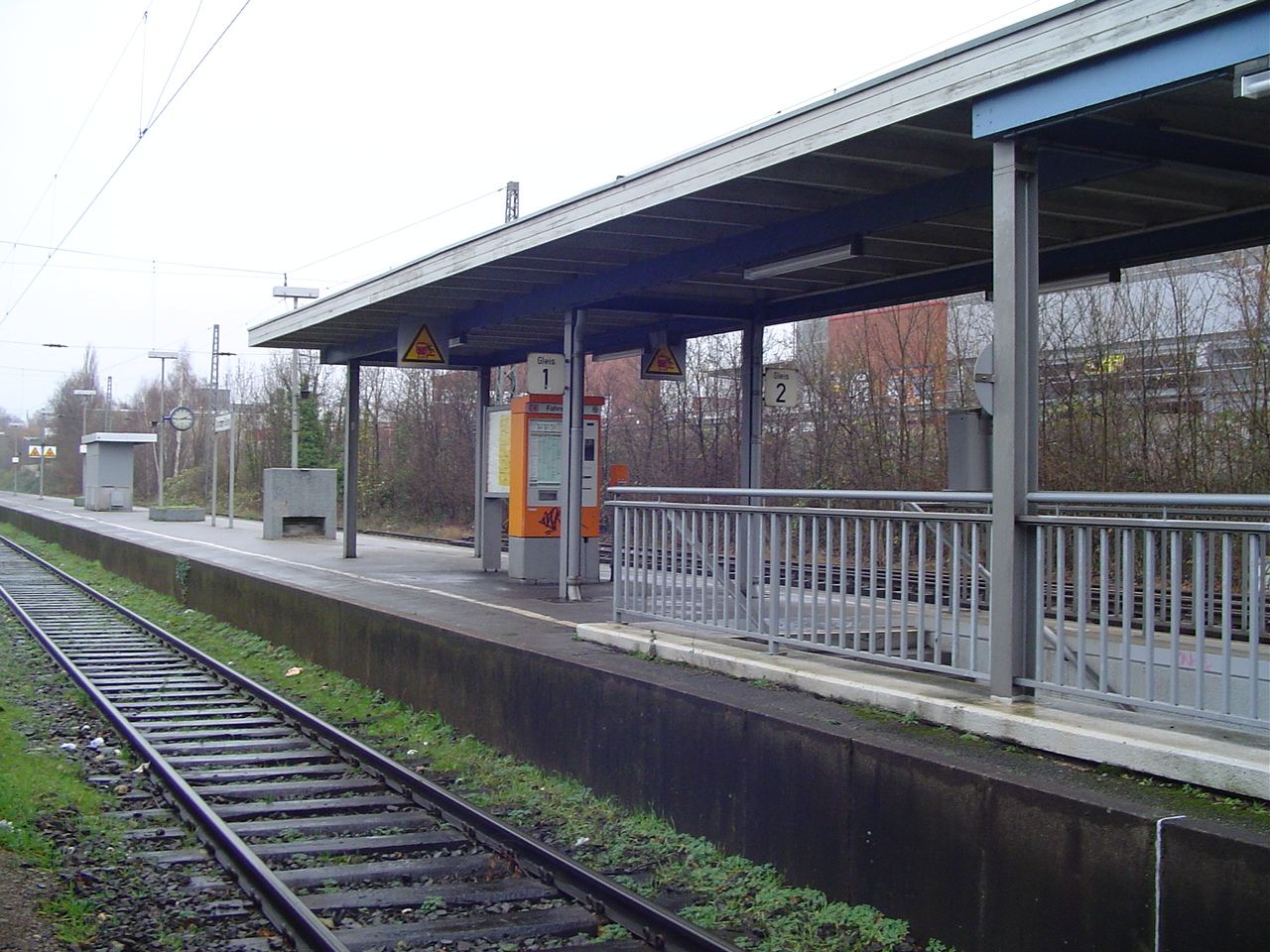

General information
- Location: Baroper Bahnhofstr., Dortmund, NRW; Germany
- Coordinates: 51°28′35″N 7°25′53″E
- Owner: DB Netz
- Operator: DB Station&Service
- Lines: Elberfeld–Dortmund (KBS 450.5)
- Platforms: 2
- Train operators: DB Regio NRW

Construction
- Accessible: No

Other information
- Station code: 1300
- DS100 code: EDBA
- IBNR: 8001527
- Category: 5
- Fare zone: VRR: 372
- Website: www.bahnhof.de

History
- Opened: 1897

Services
Preceding station	Rhine-Ruhr S-Bahn	Following station
Dortmund Hbf Terminus	S5	DO-Kruckel towards Hagen Hbf
Location
- Location within North Rhine-Westphalia

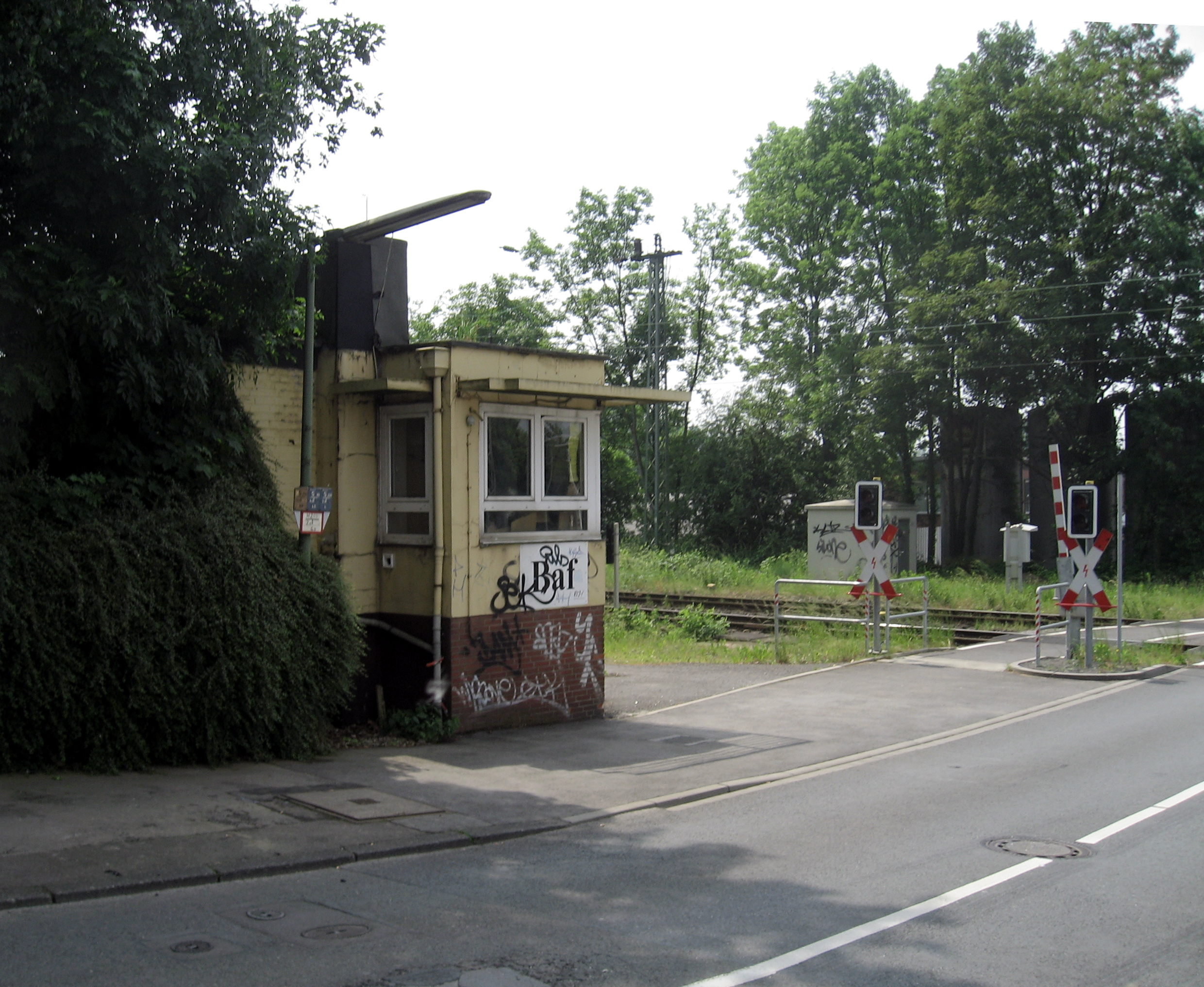
Former signal box "Baf" closed in 2006 on the Harkortstraße level crossing

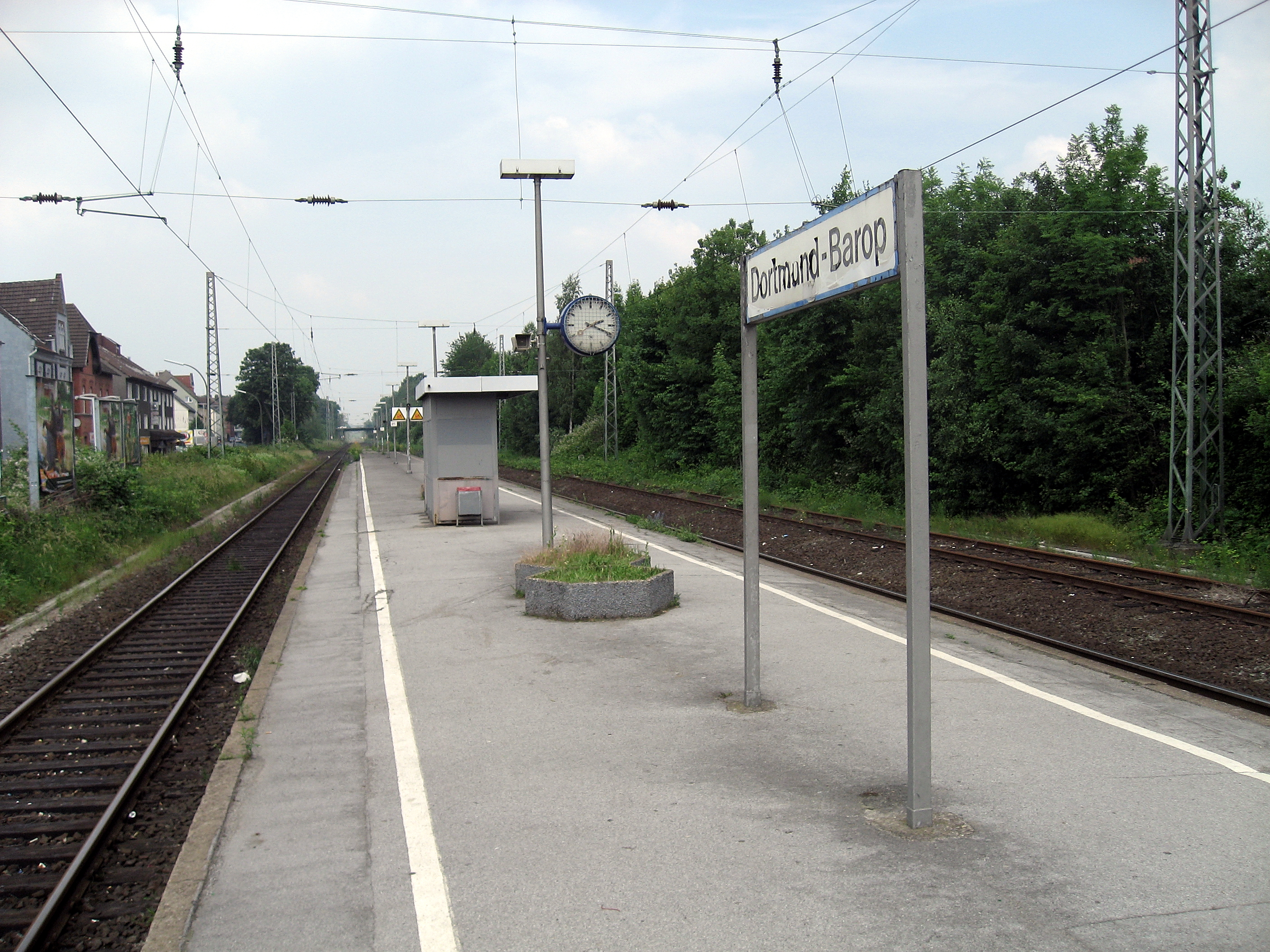
Platform

Dortmund-Barop station is on Barop Marktplatz in the Hombruch district of the city of Dortmund in the German state of North Rhine-Westphalia on the Elberfeld–Dortmund line. The station is currently classified as a category 5 station. It is served by regional services and Rhine-Ruhr S-Bahn line S 5.

== History ==
Freight operations started at Barop with the opening of the main line of the Bergisch-Märkische Railway Company in December 1848. For many years the railway was closely connected with the industrial history of the Barop/Hombruch area. Thus, the station was primarily built for the transport of coal mined in Barop and it was located near the Louise colliery in Hörder Chaussee (now Stockumer Straße), and connected by sidings to the Vereinigte Wittwe & Barop colliery and the Giesbert shaft of the Glückauf colliery, which were nearby. The Henriette colliery, which was about two km away, was probably connected by a horse-hauled tramway when the station opened.

On 9 March 1849, passenger services began running on the line. Nonetheless, freight was the centre of operations at the station: not only for the local collieries served by the station, as it was also used by local companies to load and unload freight, especially for the Baroper Maschinenfabrik ("Barop engineering works") from 1856 and the Baroper Walzwerk ("Barop rolling mill") from 1862. In 1861, the station was moved to its present location near the Harkortstraße. The Clausthal shaft of the Vereinigte Louise Tiefbau colliery was connected by a ropeway conveyor to the train station in 1865. Another track joined the station to the Gotthelf shaft of the Glückauf Tiefbau colliery from around 1870. Finally, in 1895 a track was built to the Kaiser Friedrich colliery in Menglinghauser, connecting to Barop station.

A gradual decline of the coal mines in the Barop area began from the 1880s. In 1880, the siding was extended to Holthausen colliery in Eichlinghofen and the Wittwe & Barop und Henriette colliery was closed in 1888. Large coal mining in Barop largely ended in 1925 with the closure of the remaining mines. Only the Kaiser Friedrich coking coal mine remained in operation until 1930. Also Baroper Maschinenfabrik was closed after the First World War. Other industries were established on the abandoned land in the next few years. The majority of the volume of freight in 1928 served the rolling mill, which had been acquired by Hoesch AG. A steel footbridge was built across the railway next to the Harkortstraße level crossing.

Long after the incorporation of Barop into Dortmund, this event was reflected in the renaming of the station Dortmund-Barop in May 1950.

In the 1980s, a renewed decline of freight transport in Barop began. General freight traffic was abandoned and the freight shed was used for a few years as a fruit market. The rolling mill was closed, as was the yard of the Uhde company. Even the station building, which opened in 1861, and the pedestrian bridge were demolished.

Since 29 May 1994, Barop station has been served by line S 5 of the Rhine-Ruhr S-Bahn, running between Dortmund and Hagen. Until 2002, Barop yard handled freight, since then the station has been served only by the S-Bahn. Due to this decline of freight traffic, the remaining points were taken out of service in June 2006 and the entrance and exit signals were decommissioned and replaced by block signals. Therefore, it is considered as a halt (Haltepunkt) from an operational point of view. The vacant land left after the demolition of the sidings is for sale.

== Station ==
The station is close to inner Hombruch and on the edge of the larger urban district of Barop.

The station is currently classified as a category 6 station. The code for the operating point is EDBA (E = former railway division of Essen, D = Dortmund, BA = Barop).

== Train services ==
Since 1994, line S 5 services operated by DB Regio NRW have served the station, originally operated during the day at intervals alternating between 20 and 40 minutes; since the timetable change of December 2009, the interval is regularly 30 minutes. This means that only one train an hour continues through Witten Hauptbahnhof as line S 8 to and from Hagen, Wuppertal, Düsseldorf and Mönchengladbach.

Bus route 446, which is operated by Dortmunder Stadtwerke at 60-minute intervals, stops near the station. Also bus route 448 from Witten-Rüdinghausen to Dortmund-Löttringhausen stops near the station, which is operated at 30-minute intervals until the early evening.

The two nearby stations of the Dortmund Stadtbahn at Barop Parkhaus and Hombruch Harkortstraße give much better connections within Dortmund, so Barop S-Bahn station plays a relatively small role in inner-city transport.
