= Witten-Annen Nord station =

Railway station in Annen, Germany

Witten Annen Nord
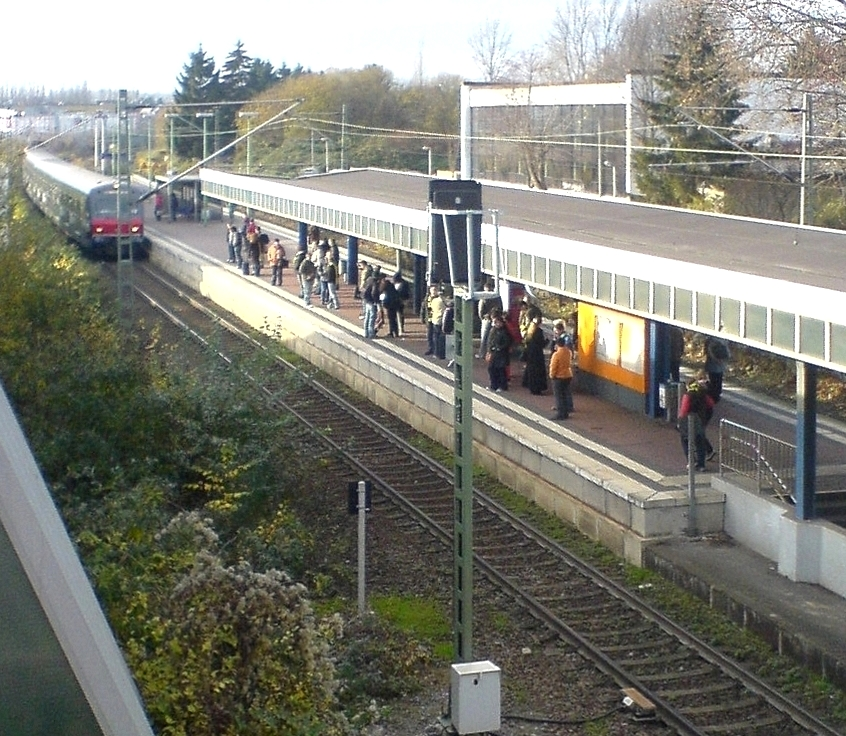
- 2006

General information
- Location: Witten-Annen, NRW; Germany
- Coordinates: 51°26′53″N 7°22′32″E
- Owner: DB Netz
- Operator: DB Station&Service
- Lines: Elberfeld–Dortmund (KBS 450.5)
- Platforms: 2
- Train operators: DB Regio NRW

Construction
- Accessible: No

Other information
- Station code: 6728
- DS100 code: EWIA
- Category: 6
- Fare zone: VRR: 472
- Website: www.bahnhof.de

History
- Opened: 9 March 1849

Services
Preceding station	Rhine-Ruhr S-Bahn	Following station
DO-Kruckel towards Dortmund Hbf	S5	Witten Hbf towards Hagen Hbf
Location
- Location within North Rhine-Westphalia

Witten-Annen Nord station is located in the Annen district of Witten in the German state of North Rhine-Westphalia. The station is currently classified as a category 6 station. It is served by Rhine-Ruhr S-Bahn line S 5.

== History ==
Annen station was opened on 9 March 1849 by the Bergisch-Märkische Railway Company (German: Bergisch Märkischen Eisenbahn-Gesellschaft, BME) on its original Elberfeld–Dortmund line and was served by passenger and freight trains.

After the opening of the Annen Süd station on the Dortmund-Löttringhausen–Bochum-Langendreer line (known as the Rheinischer Esel—“Rhenish donkey”) of the Rhenish Railway Company on 15 December 1880, it was renamed Annen Nord station.

In the 1980s the old BME station building was replaced by commercial buildings and the freight loading ramp disappeared in the 1990s. As part of a program of rationalisation of freight operations between 2002 and 2004 (known as MORA C), the last freight operations at the station were abandoned.

== Train services ==
Witten-Annen Nord station and Witten Hauptbahnhof are the only S-Bahn stations in the city of Witten. Since 1994, line S 5 services operated by DB Regio NRW have served the station, originally operated during the day at intervals alternating between 20 and 40 minutes. Since the timetable change of December 2009, the interval is regularly 30 minutes. This means that one train an hour continues through Witten Hauptbahnhof to and from Hagen. In the evening there are a few direct connections via Hagen and Wuppertal to Düsseldorf/Mönchengladbach.

There is also a bus junction at the station served by bus lines 320 and 375 operated by BOGESTRA and 373 of the Verkehrsgesellschaft Ennepe-Ruhr, connecting with central Witten, Rüdinghausen, Herbede, Sprockhövel, Durchholz, Heven, Stockum, the Kemnader See, the Lottenbach valley and Ruhr University Bochum. At night (weekends) the station is also connected by night bus line NE18 to Bochum-Langendreer via Witten-Stockum and central Witten.

== Station ==
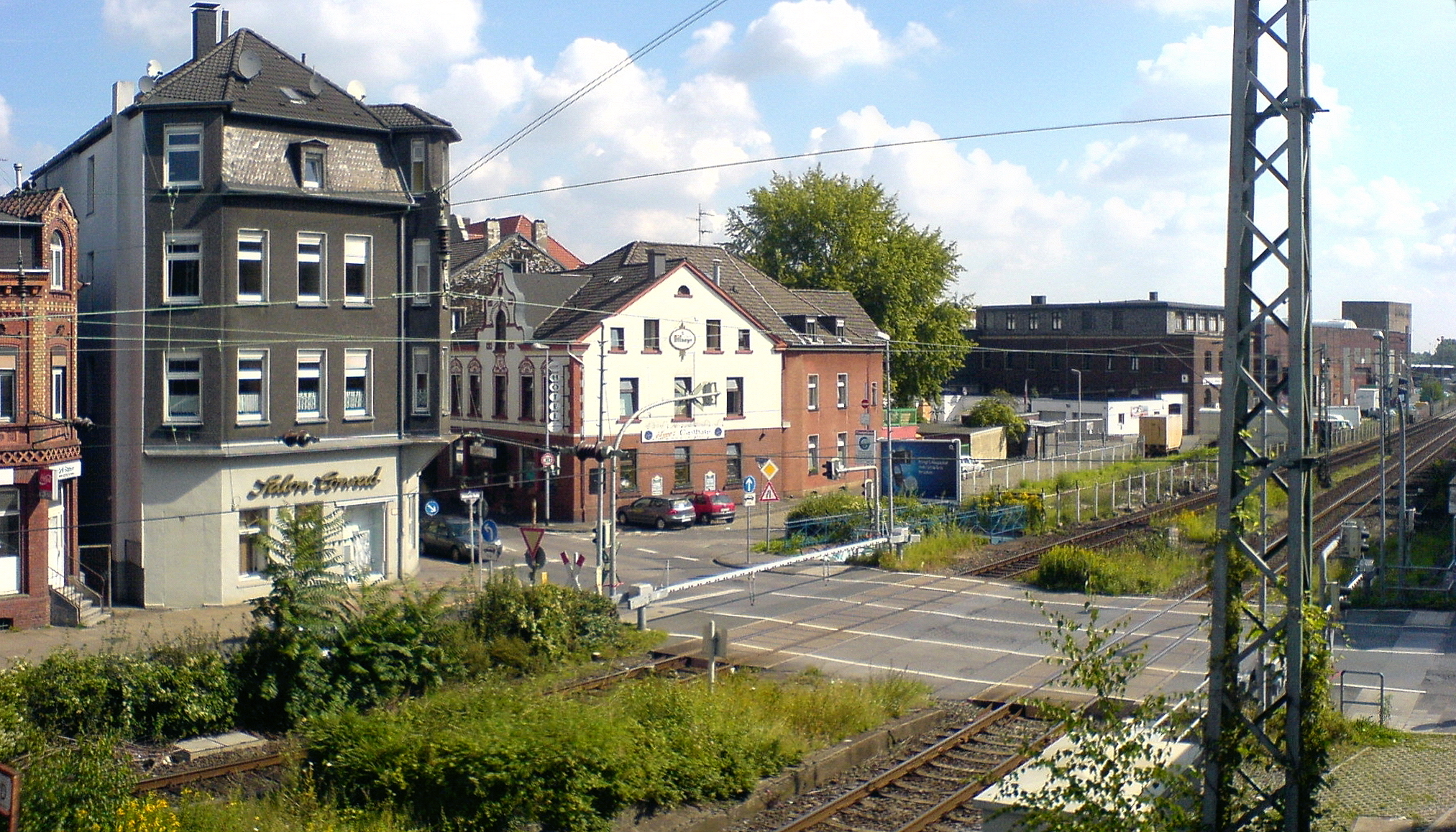
Level crossing at the end of the station

The station is currently classified as a category 6 station. It is considered as a halt (Haltepunkt) from an operational point of view, as the last crossover was removed in May 2006. The code for the operating point is EWIA (E = former railway division of Essen, Wi = Witten, A = Annen Nord) and its international station number is 8006510.

The current station building was built for the purpose in the 1980s by Deutsche Bundesbahn. In addition to access to the platform there is a pharmacy and a clothing store. The platform approach is not suitable for wheelchairs, so wheelchair users cannot use the S 5 without help. There on the roof over the station car park, which us used by park and ride commuters. Close to the station, there is also bicycle storage for "bike and ride" commuters.
