= Dortmund-Kruckel station =

Railway station in Dortmund, Germany

Dortmund Kruckel
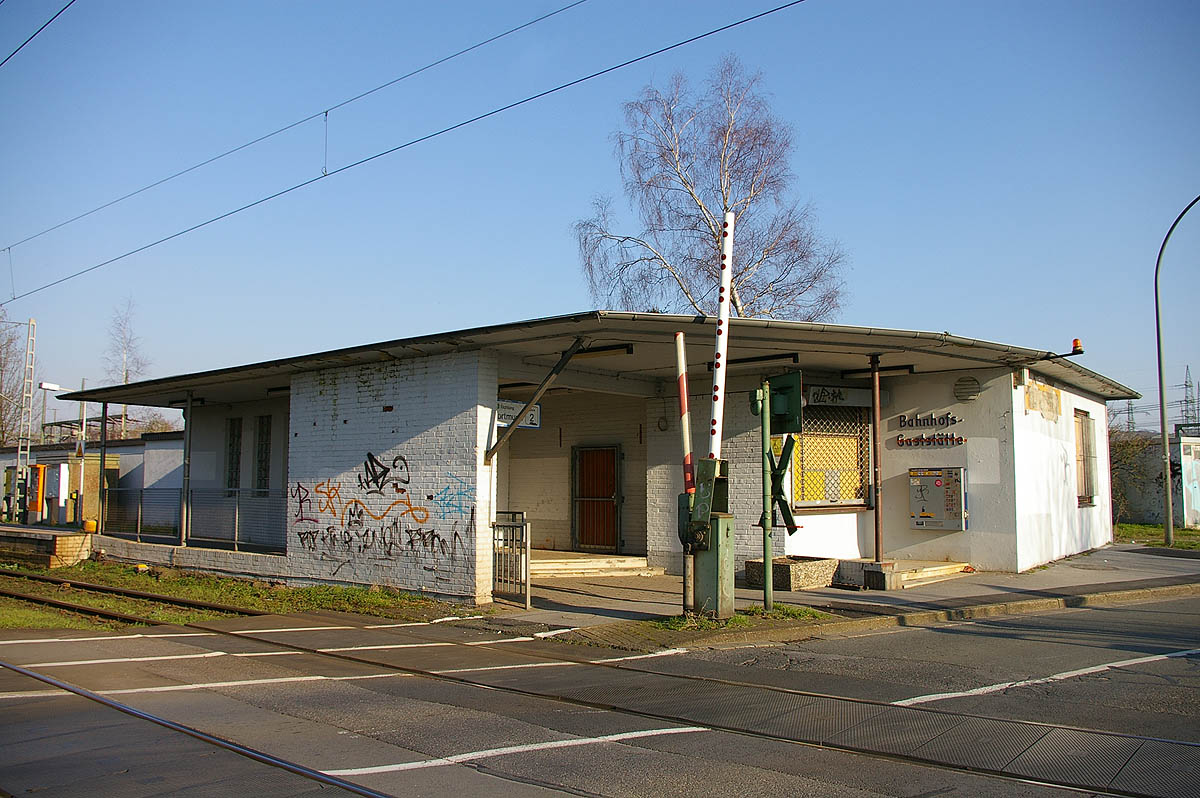
- Abandoned station building and the level crossing giving access to the platforms

General information
- Location: Dortmund, NRW; Germany
- Coordinates: 51°27′30″N 7°24′56″E
- Owner: DB Netz
- Operator: DB Station&Service
- Lines: Elberfeld–Dortmund (KBS 450.5)
- Platforms: 2
- Train operators: DB Regio NRW

Construction
- Accessible: Yes

Other information
- Station code: 1314
- DS100 code: EDKR
- Category: 6
- Fare zone: VRR: 372
- Website: www.bahnhof.de

History
- Opened: 1897

Services
Preceding station	Rhine-Ruhr S-Bahn	Following station
DO-Barop towards Dortmund Hbf	S5	Witten-Annen Nord towards Hagen Hbf
Location
- Location within North Rhine-Westphalia

Dortmund-Kruckel station lies on the border between the suburbs of Dortmund-Kruckel and Dortmund-Persebeck of the city of Dortmund in the German state of North Rhine-Westphalia on the Elberfeld–Dortmund line. The station is currently classified as a category 6 station. It is served by regional services and Rhine-Ruhr S-Bahn line S 5.

== History ==
The station is located on the Elberfeld–Dortmund line, which opened in 1848 by the Bergisch-Märkische Railway Company. The station was opened as Kruckel station in 1897 by the Prussian state railways and originally served as a loading station for the Vereinigte Wiendahlsbank colliery. From 1905, it was served by passenger trains. In 1950, the station was renamed Dortmund-Kruckel.

Until 1988, regular long-distance trains served the station. At the opening of S-Bahn lines S 1 and line S 2, these long-distance trains had to regularly cross the S-Bahn tracks in Dortmund Hauptbahnhof on the level. To prevent this, Deutsche Bundesbahn constructed a new line between Dortmund-Dorstfeld and Bochum-Langendreer. Train services at Dortmund Kruckel have declined significantly since then. Today long-distance trains and the Wupper-Express only operate via Dortmund-Kruckel when the main line via the Oberstraße Tunnel is blocked and services have to be rerouted.

For a long time there was a freight yard at Dortmund Kruckel, especially serving sidings to nearby companies.

== Station ==
The station serves Kruckel, Persebeck and parts of the Witten districts of Rüdinghausen and Schnee. As part of the conversion of the line from a regional line served by N 33 trains to an S-Bahn line, the platforms were raised to a height of 76 mm. Although there is access for wheelchair users to the platform, they cannot enter the S 5 trains, which have a step height of 96 mm, without outside help. It consists of two tracks that are accessed through side platforms. No structure links the platforms because the tracks can be crossed at the adjacent level crossing on Kruckeler Straße.

The station is currently classified as a category 6 station. It is considered as a halt (Haltepunkt) from an operational point of view, as the last crossovers have been removed. The code for the operating point is EWIA (E = former railway division of Essen, Wi = Witten, Kr = Kruckel)

Since the restaurant was closed in the former station building after 35 years of operations, the building and the park and ride lot on the other side of the railway line have been for sale.

== Train services ==
Since 1994, line S 5 services operated by DB Regio NRW have served the station, originally operated during the day at intervals alternating between 20 and 40 minutes; since the timetable change of December 2009, the interval is regularly 30 minutes. This means that only one train an hour continues through Witten Hauptbahnhof as line S 8 to and from Hagen, Wuppertal, Düsseldorf and Mönchengladbach.

The circular route of bus line 448 of Dortmunder Stadtwerke provides only a rudimentary feeder services from the outlying areas to the station.
