= Wetter (Ruhr) station =

Railway station in Alt-Wetter, Germany

Wetter (Ruhr)
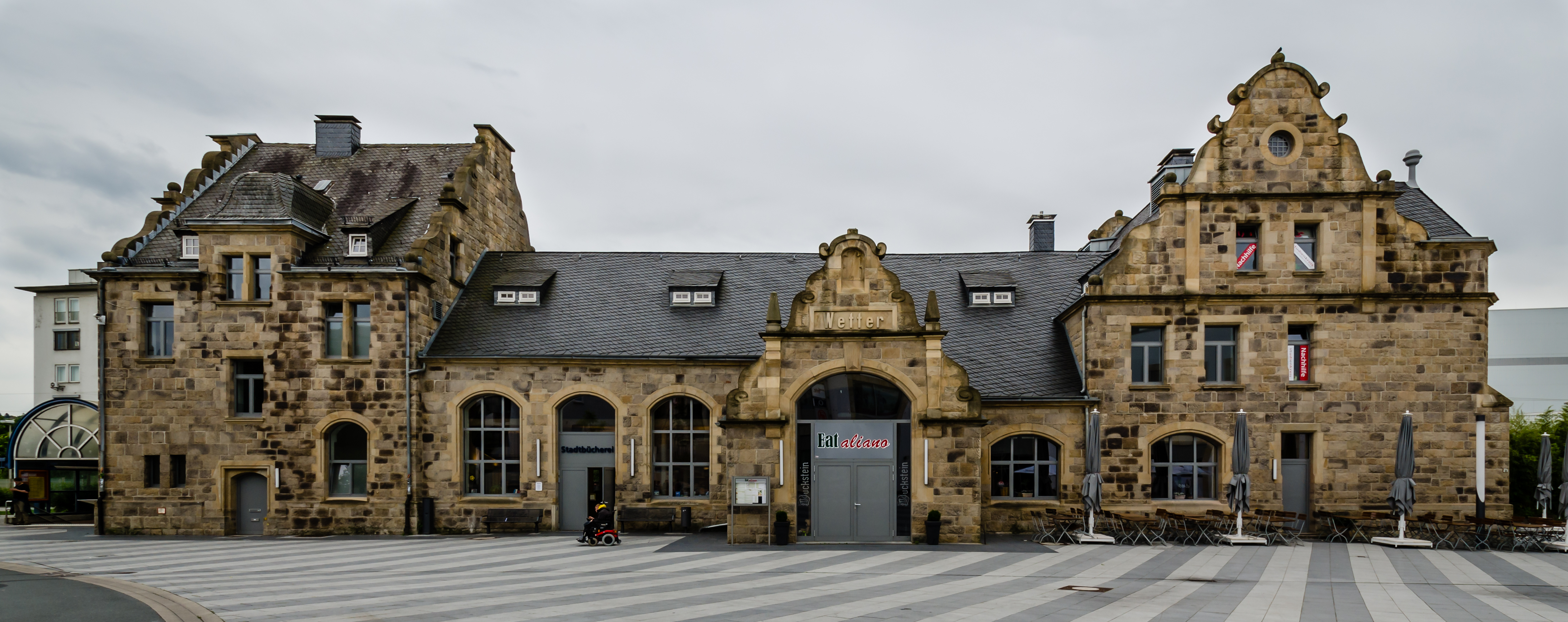
- Entrance building

General information
- Location: Bahnhofstr. 19, Wetter (Ruhr), NRW; Germany
- Coordinates: 51°23′10″N 7°23′10″E
- Owner: DB Netz
- Operator: DB Station&Service
- Lines: Elberfeld–Dortmund (KBS 427, 455, 450.5)
- Platforms: 2
- Train operators: DB Regio NRW

Construction
- Accessible: Yes

Other information
- Station code: 6728
- DS100 code: EWET
- IBNR: 8006386
- Category: 5
- Fare zone: VRR: 476
- Website: www.bahnhof.de

History
- Opened: 9 March 1849

Services
Preceding station	National Express Germany	Following station
Witten Hbf towards Aachen Hbf	RE 4 (Wupper-Express)	Hagen Hbf towards Dortmund Hbf
Preceding station	DB Regio NRW	Following station
Witten Hbf towards Essen Hbf	RB 40	Hagen-Vorhalle towards Hagen Hbf
Preceding station	VIAS	Following station
Witten Hbf towards Essen Hbf	RE 16	Hagen Hbf towards Iserlohn
Preceding station	Rhine-Ruhr S-Bahn	Following station
Witten Hbf towards Dortmund Hbf	S5	Hagen-Vorhalle towards Hagen Hbf
Location
- Location within North Rhine-Westphalia

Wetter (Ruhr) station is in the district of Vorhalle in the centre of the city Wetter (Ruhr) in the German state of North Rhine-Westphalia. It is served by regional services and Rhine-Ruhr S-Bahn line S 5.

== History ==
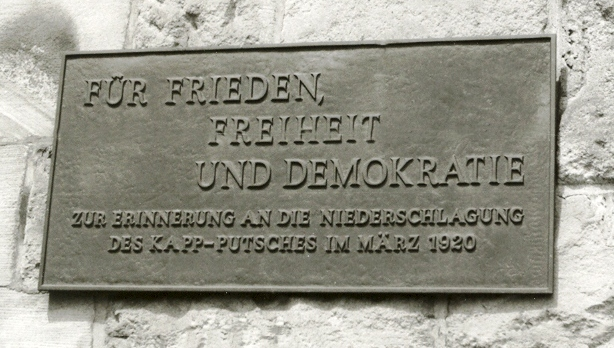
Plaque at station commemorating Ruhr Uprising, "For peace, freedom, and democracy. In memory of the suppression of the Kapp Revolt in March 1920".

The station is located on the Elberfeld–Dortmund line and was opened on 9 March 1849 as a through station by the Bergisch-Märkische Railway Company. The original station building, which was built in 1850, was demolished by the Prussian state railways and replaced by the existing building in 1905.

On 17 March 1920 there was fighting at the station during the Ruhr Uprising, between units of the Ruhr Red Army and a vanguard of the Freikorps Lichtschlag, in response to the Kapp Putsch. A plaque commemorates the events.

In 1994, line S 5 services of the Rhine-Ruhr S-Bahn began operating on the line through the station and regional service N 33 was discontinued.

Today the station building is no longer used by the railway. Instead the city library has been located here since 2007. A catering business has also occupied the building since the spring of 2008.

== Train services ==
The station is currently served by S 5 services at 30-minute intervals and the Ruhr-Lenne-Bahn (RB 40) at hourly intervals, both operated by DB Regio NRW). It is also served by hourly services of the Ruhr-Lenne-Express (RE 16) (operated by VIAS) and the Wupper-Express (RE 4) services, operated by National Express. Long-distance passenger services pass through without stopping. Freight trains do not regularly operate through the station, because freight trains use the Ruhr Valley line on the other side of the Ruhr.

The station is also a bus junction and an important point of interchange between rail and urban transport. It is served by the express bus route SB38 and city bus lines 541, 553, 555, 591, 592, 593 and 595, operated by Hagener Straßenbahn AG, Verkehrsgesellschaft Ennepe-Ruhr and Busverkehr Rheinland, at hourly intervals.

== Station ==
The station is currently classified as a category 5 station. It is considered as a halt (German: Haltepunkt) from an operational point of view, as all crossovers have been removed. Between the two tracks there is a central platform, which can be accessed via a staircase, but it can also be accessed by barrier-free ramps so that wheelchair users can reach trains without help. There is a parking garage next to the station, used by park-and-ride commuters. The station is close to the Ruhrtal Center, a shopping centre.
