= Witten-Annen =

Coordinates: 51°26′59″N 7°22′32″E

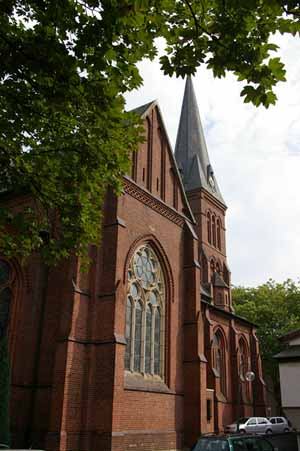
The St. Josef Church in Annen

Since 1929, Annen has been a part of the City of Witten (since 1946 North Rhine-Westphalia, Germany). As one of the eight boroughs of Witten, it is now called Witten-Annen. Before the incorporation with Witten in 1929, Annen was part of the administrative district Landkreis Hoerde. Today, Annen has about 19,000 inhabitants and is the biggest of all boroughs of Witten. Witten-Annen has an institute for Waldorf pedagogics, as well as a Waldorf school. This school annually hosts the international eurythmy festival, Forum Eurythmie. It is served by Witten-Annen Nord station on Rhine-Ruhr S-Bahn line S 5 and three bus lines (320, 373 and 375). At the weekend it is also served by night bus line NE 18.

In 1944 a subcamp of Buchenwald was constructed in Witten-Annen to supply workers for AGW, the Annen cast steelworks (Annener Gußstahlwerk). The camp was liberated on April 11, 1945 by the US Army.
