= Hagen-Vorhalle station =

Railway station in Germany

Hagen Vorhalle
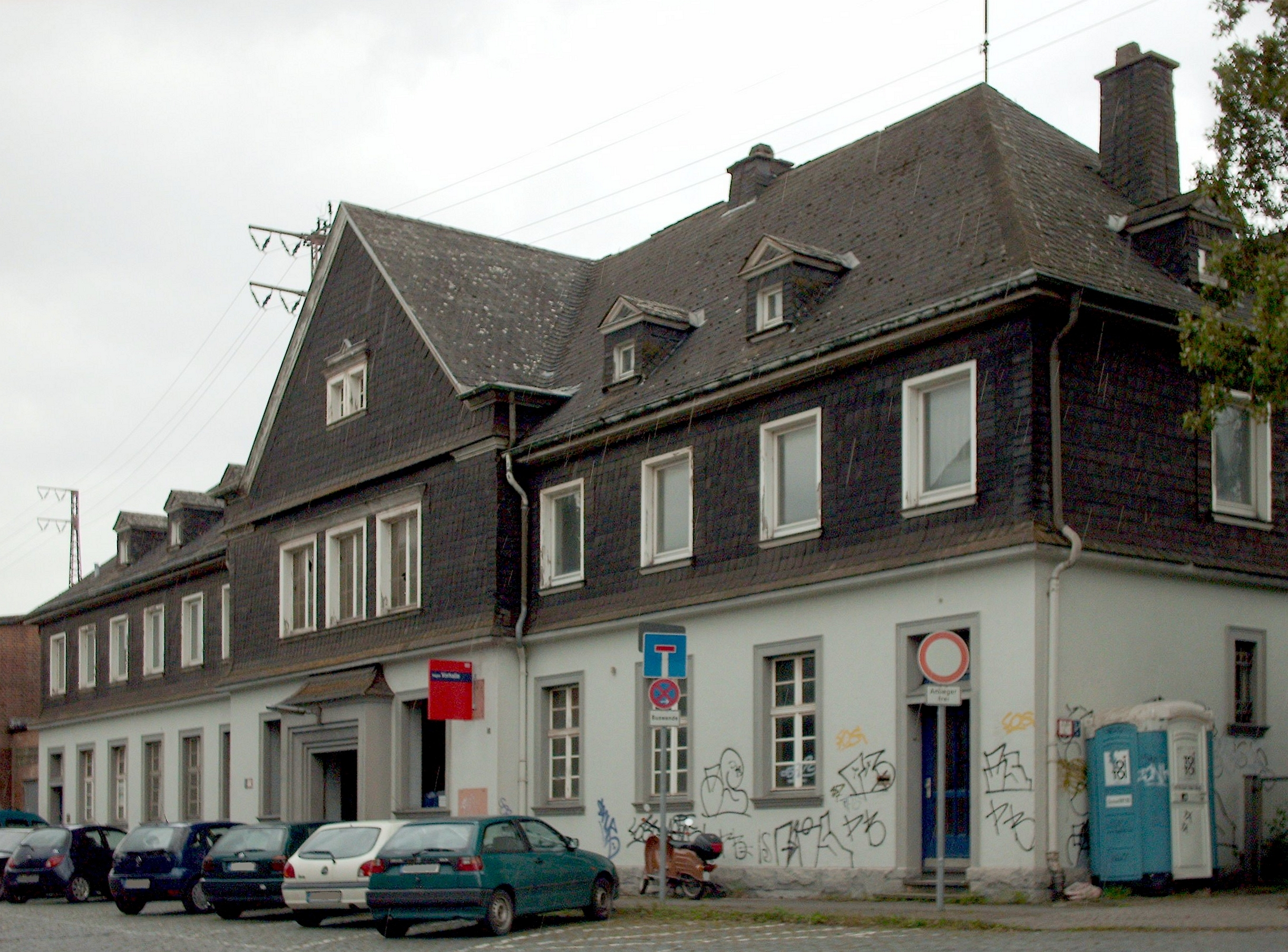
- Entrance to the passenger station

General information
- Location: Brüninghausstraße 13, Hagen, North Rhine-Westphalia; Germany
- Coordinates: 51°23′17″N 7°26′03″E
- Owner: DB Netz
- Operator: DB Station&Service
- Lines: Elberfeld–Dortmund (KBS 427, KBS 450.5)
- Platforms: 2
- Train operators: DB Regio NRW
- Connections: S5

Construction
- Accessible: Yes

Other information
- Station code: 2463
- DS100 code: EHGV
- IBNR: 8000977
- Category: 6
- Fare zone: VRR: 588
- Website: www.bahnhof.de

History
- Opened: 9 March 1849

Services
Preceding station	DB Regio NRW	Following station
Wetter (Ruhr) towards Essen Hbf	RB 40	Hagen Hbf Terminus
Preceding station	Rhine-Ruhr S-Bahn	Following station
Wetter (Ruhr) towards Dortmund Hbf	S5	Hagen Hbf Terminus
Location

Hagen-Vorhalle station is a large marshalling yard of national importance and a small passenger station for local services in the Hagen district of Vorhalle in the German state of North Rhine-Westphalia. It was opened in its present form in 1910 in and is one of the nine major marshalling yards in Germany and a key element of the 200X program to upgrade Germany's freight infrastructure initiated in 2006 by the former Railion Deutschland AG (now DB Schenker Rail). The station is located on the Ruhr Valley Railway and the Elberfeld–Dortmund line. The station was opened on the 9 March 1849 as Herdecke station and successively renamed as Herdecke Süd, Herdecke-Vorhalle and Vorhalle. It was renamed as Hagen-Vorhalle in the early 1950s.

== Marshalling yard ==
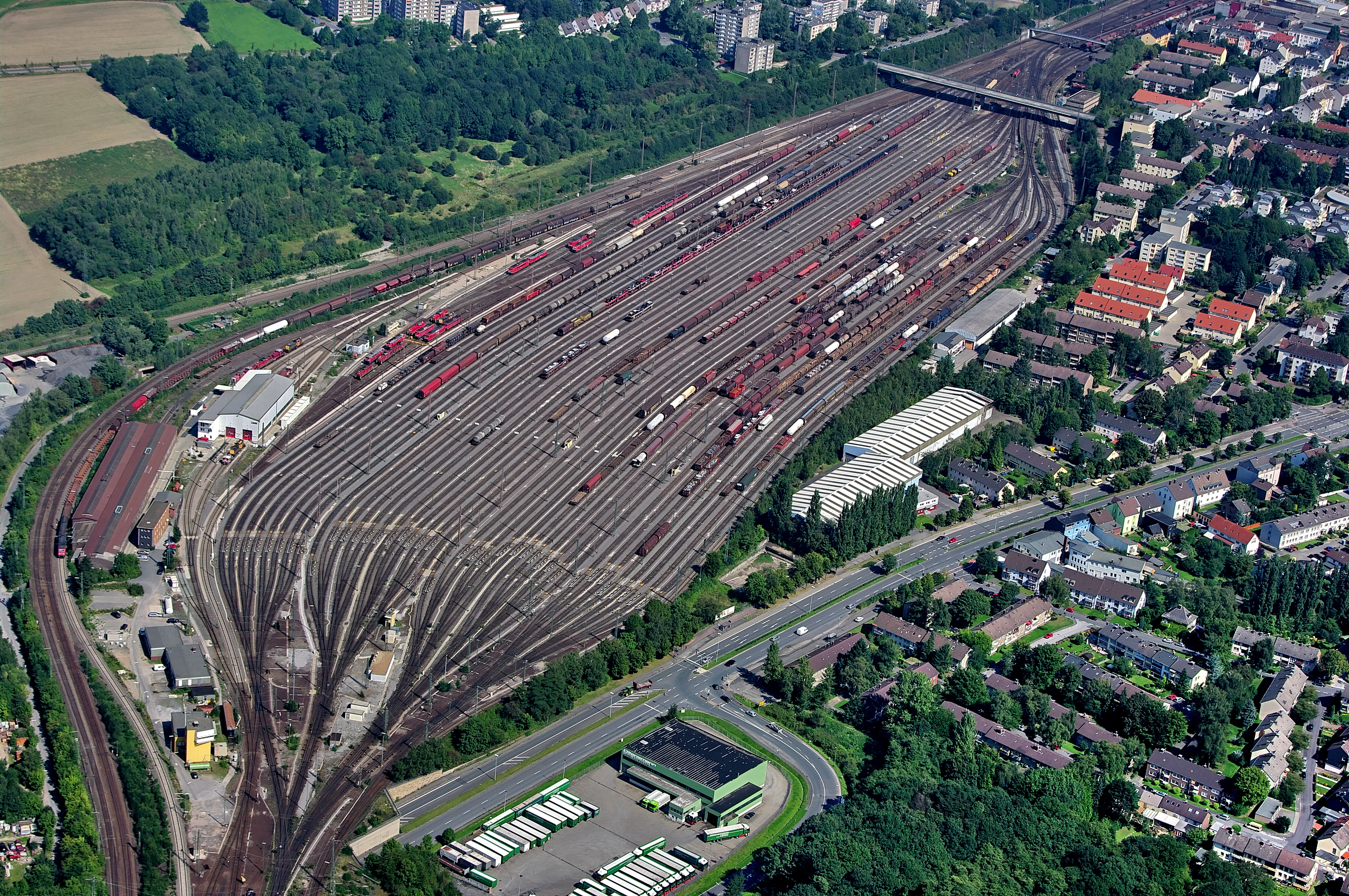
Marshalling yard tracks – aerial view, 2008

The yard has eleven arrival tracks, two hump tracks and 40 classification tracks up to 920 m long. The freight wagons or sets of wagons are run over the hump and then retarded by a series of automatic retarders and finally pushed together for coupling. The wagons are then coupled together with their brake hoses and the brakes are tested by a remote-controlled brake test system. The entire marshalling operation is automatically controlled by a central electronic interlocking. Intervention by the signallers is only required if there is a fault.

The Hagen-Vorhalle yard was modernised between 2004 and 2006 by DB Netz (a subsidiary of Deutsche Bahn). The fully automated system was commissioned in January 2007. The modernisation significantly reduced staff numbers at the yard.

== Passenger station ==
The Hagen-Vorhalle passenger station originally consisted of two central platforms; today only one is left, facing two tracks. The station is currently classified as a category 6 station. It is served by Regionalbahn service RB 40 (Ruhr-Lenne-Bahn) running between Essen Hauptbahnhof and Hagen Hauptbahnhof at 60-minute intervals and line S 5 of the Rhine-Ruhr S-Bahn, running between Dortmund Hauptbahnhof and Hagen also at 60-minute intervals.

It is also served by bus route 516, operated by Hagener Straßenbahn AG at 30-minute intervals, and route 554, operated by Verkehrsgesellschaft Ennepe-Ruhr at 60-minute intervals during the day and bus route 376 by Bochum-Gelsenkirchener Straßenbahn AG serves the station also at 60-minute intervals. On Sundays bus route 516 is replaced by the rerouted bus route 521.
