= Nahmerbach =

River in Germany

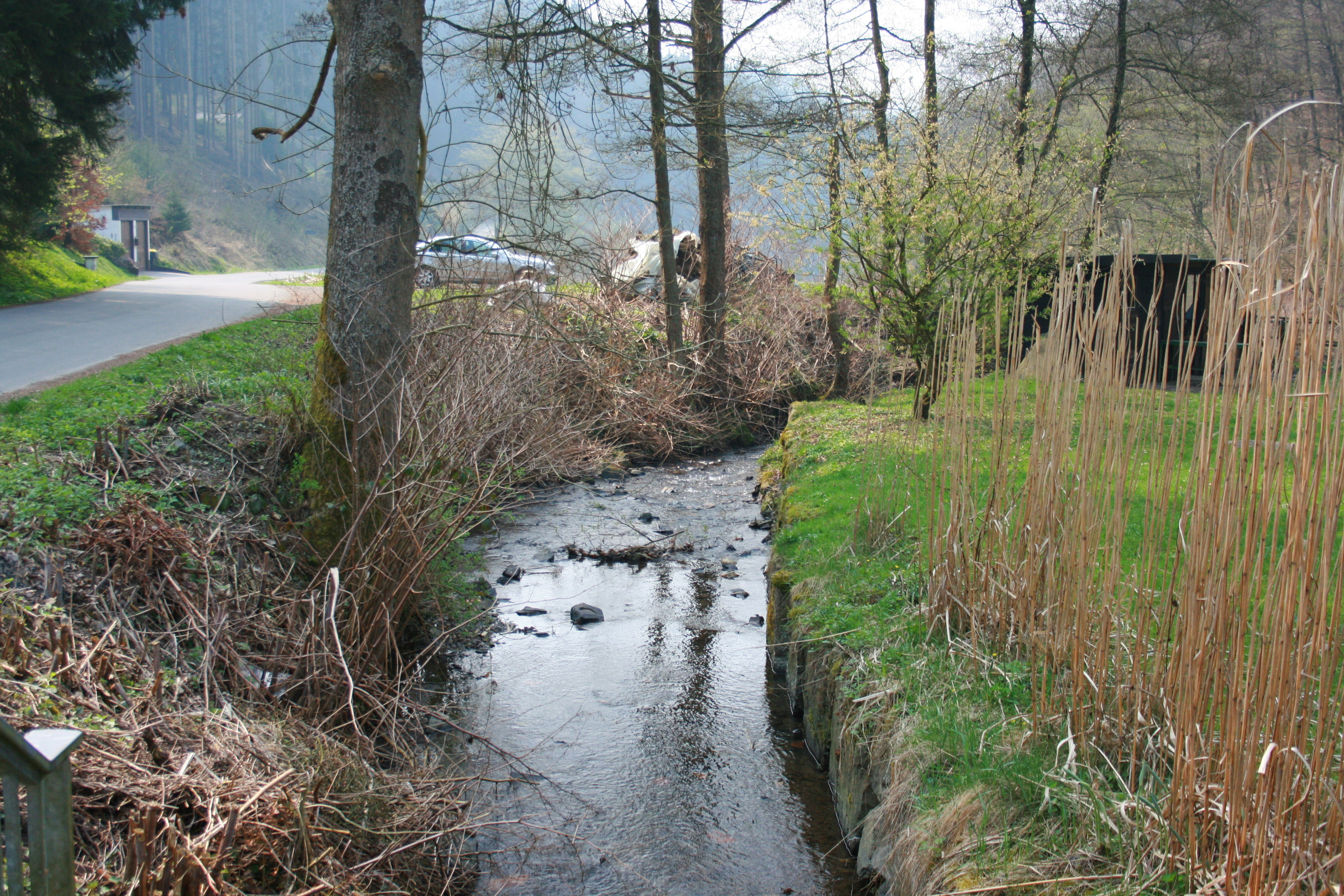

Location
- Country: Germany
- State: North Rhine-Westphalia

Physical characteristics
- Mouth
  - location: Lenne
  - coordinates: 51.3453°N 7.5800°E
- Length: 11.1 km (6.9 mi)

Basin features
- Progression: Lenne→ Ruhr→ Rhine→ North Sea

Nahmerbach is a river of North Rhine-Westphalia, Germany. It flows into the Lenne near Hagen-Hohenlimburg.

== See also ==
- List of rivers of North Rhine-Westphalia
