= Ruhr–Sieg railway =

Railway in North Rhine-Westphalia, Germany

Ruhr–Sieg line
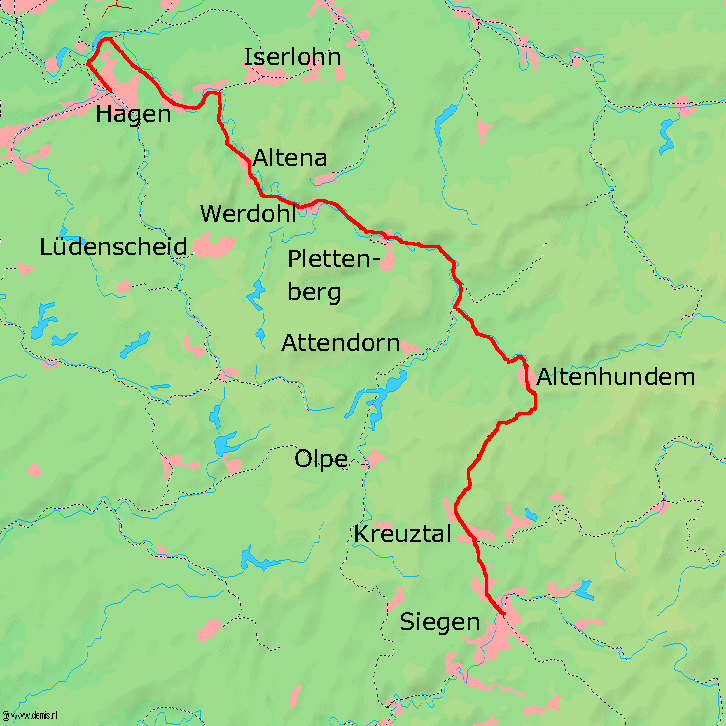

Overview
- Line number: 2800 (Hagen–Weidenau); 2880 (Weidenau-Siegen)
- Locale: North Rhine-Westphalia

Service
- Route number: 440

Technical
- Line length: 106 km (66 mi)
- Track gauge: 1,435 mm (4 ft 8 1/2 in) standard gauge
- Electrification: 15 kV/16.7 Hz AC overhead
- Operating speed: 120 km/h (74.6 mph) (max)

The Ruhr–Sieg railway is a 106 km long double-track, electrified main line from Hagen to Siegen via Iserlohn-Letmathe, Finnentrop and Kreuztal in the German state of North Rhine-Westphalia. The line, which has many tunnels, runs primarily through the valley of the Lenne. South of Altenhundem it crosses the watershed between the Lenne and the Sieg. The line was opened between 1859 and 1861 and is one of the oldest railways in Germany.

== History ==
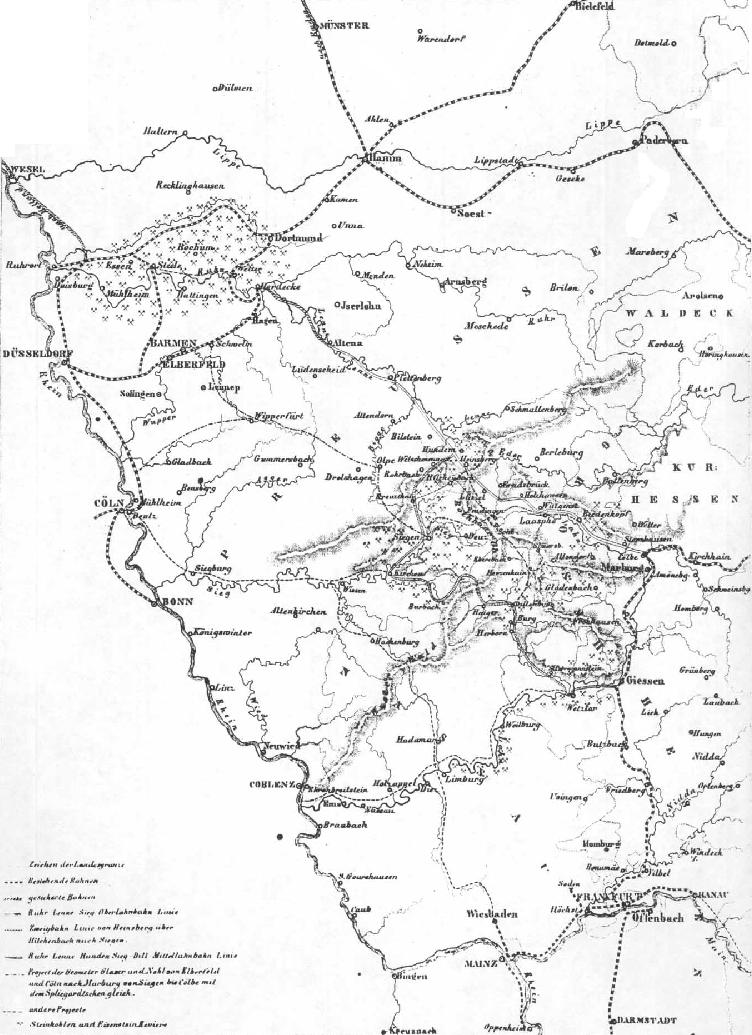
Map

In 1835 a committee was established in Siegen to promote the construction of a horse-drawn railway from Siegen to the Ruhr. The goal was better and faster transport of coal from the Ruhr for smelting in the Siegen area. Iron production in the Siegen country was very important for Prussia. It produced over 23 percent of the country’s total pig iron production and 85 percent of its crude steel production.

During the lengthy approval process, the committee, which was based in Hagen from 1851, changed the proposal to a steam railway, rather than a horse-drawn railway. There was a dispute for a long time about exactly where the line should run. A line from Hagen via the Volme valley was favoured initially. Later a line running along the Lenne and the Hundem valley was preferred. An interest group from Olpe wanted the main line to run through the Bigge valley. The committees in both Siegen and Hagen selected a more easterly route through the Hundem valley because it would be shorter and therefore cheaper.

Construction was finally approved in 1856 with a state guarantee of interest payments. Because the line promised economic growth above all for the iron works along it, they took part in financing the line, for instance the Meggen works and the Würdinghausen iron works invested 1,000 thalers each, the Carolinen iron works invested 5,000 thalers and the town of Kirchhundem invested 2,100 thalers. The hoped-for traffic was not achieved at first because charcoal could be brought especially from the Sauerland to the Siegen area. The highest point of the railway line between Hagen and Haiger is Welschen Ennest at almost 411 m above sea level.

=== Line construction ===
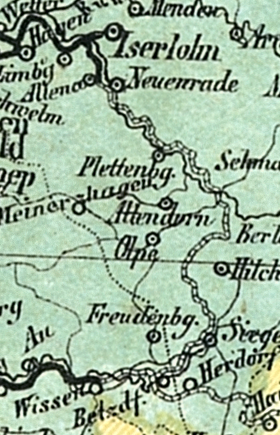
Ruhr-Sieg line in the German rail map of 1861

The line was built from 1858 to 1861 under the direction of Bergisch-Märkische Railway Company and took place with few problems. The construction of tunnels involved the Austrian engineer Franz von Rziha, who had already participated in the construction of the Semmering railway. Since narrow valleys had to be crossed, the Borsig company built a special locomotive, class 675, designed for its curves. At first the line was single track, but it was duplicated in 1870. The section from Hagen to Letmathe was opened on 21 March 1859, the Letmathe–Altena section opened on 17 July 1860 and finally the last part from Altena to Siegen opened on 6 August 1861. The Ruhr-Sieg line had been formally inaugurated on the previous day. In this ceremony a train derailed at Grevenbrück, without any complaints of injury.

Stations were built in all the major towns. Tudor style stations were built in Plettenberg, Grevenbrück and Kreuztal, attracting attention as unusual designs for the region (today they are listed monuments). Engine sheds with turntables were commissioned in Letmathe (for 2 locomotives), Altena (6 locos), Altenhundem (6 locos), Kreuztal (2 locos) and Siegen (9 locos). In the late 1870s a depot was built at Finnentrop, close to the branch lines to Olpe (Bigge Valley Railway) and Wennemen (Finnentrop–Wennemen line). Together with Altenhundem it gradually developed into one of the centres for operations on the Ruhr–Sieg line. Altemhundem was primarily used for heavy freight locomotives for pushing trains up the ramp to Welschen-Ennest station. The depots in Letmathe and Kreuztal lost their importance because of their proximity to the major depots in Hagen and Siegen. Altena depot was abandoned at the beginning of the 20th century. As part of the electrification, Altenhundem depot was abandoned and Finnentrop depot was greatly reduced, as the line is now only used by diesel multiple units.

=== Long-distance passenger services ===
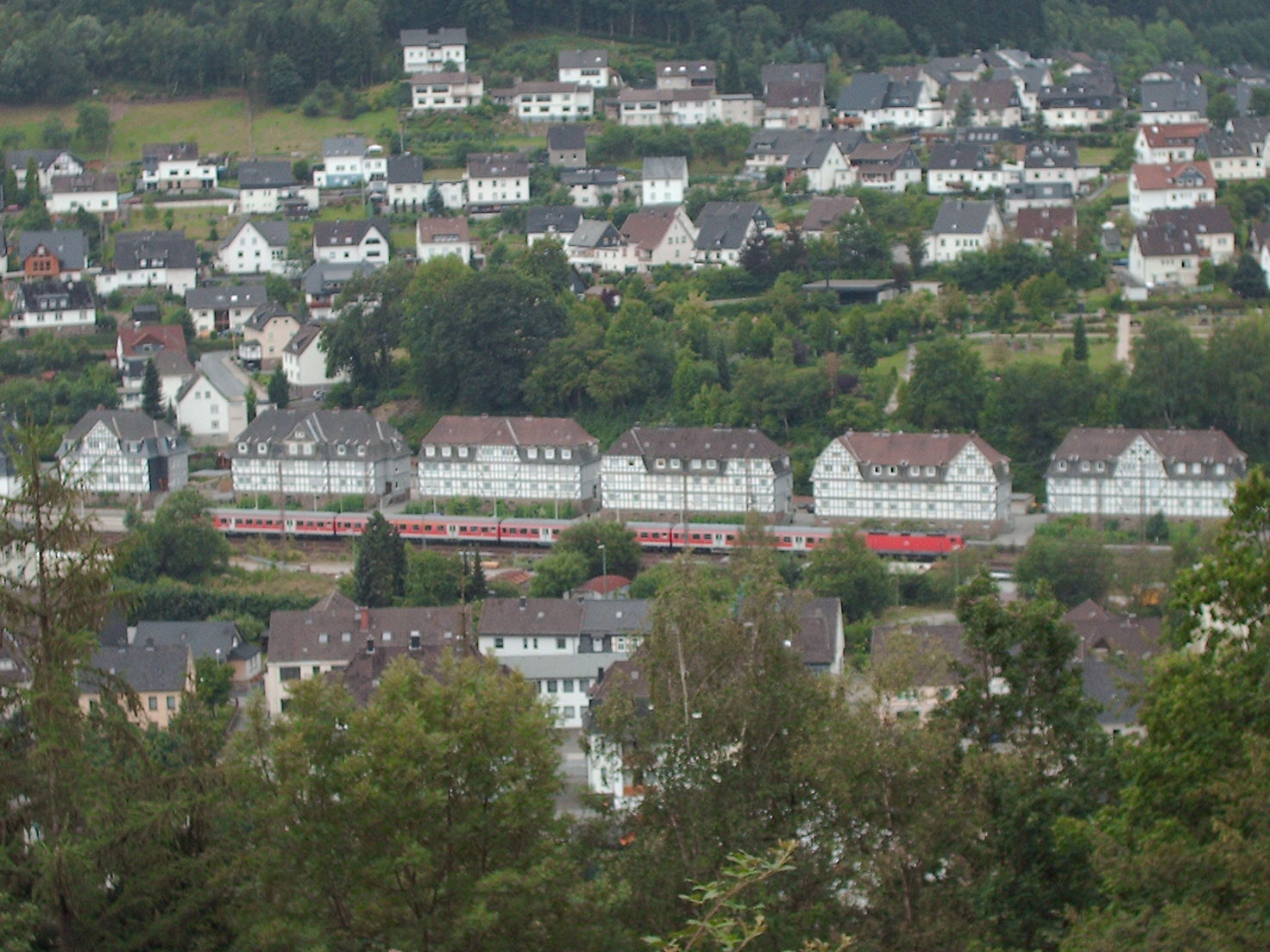
A locomotive-hauled train of the Ruhr-Sieg line leaves Lennestadt-Meggen station

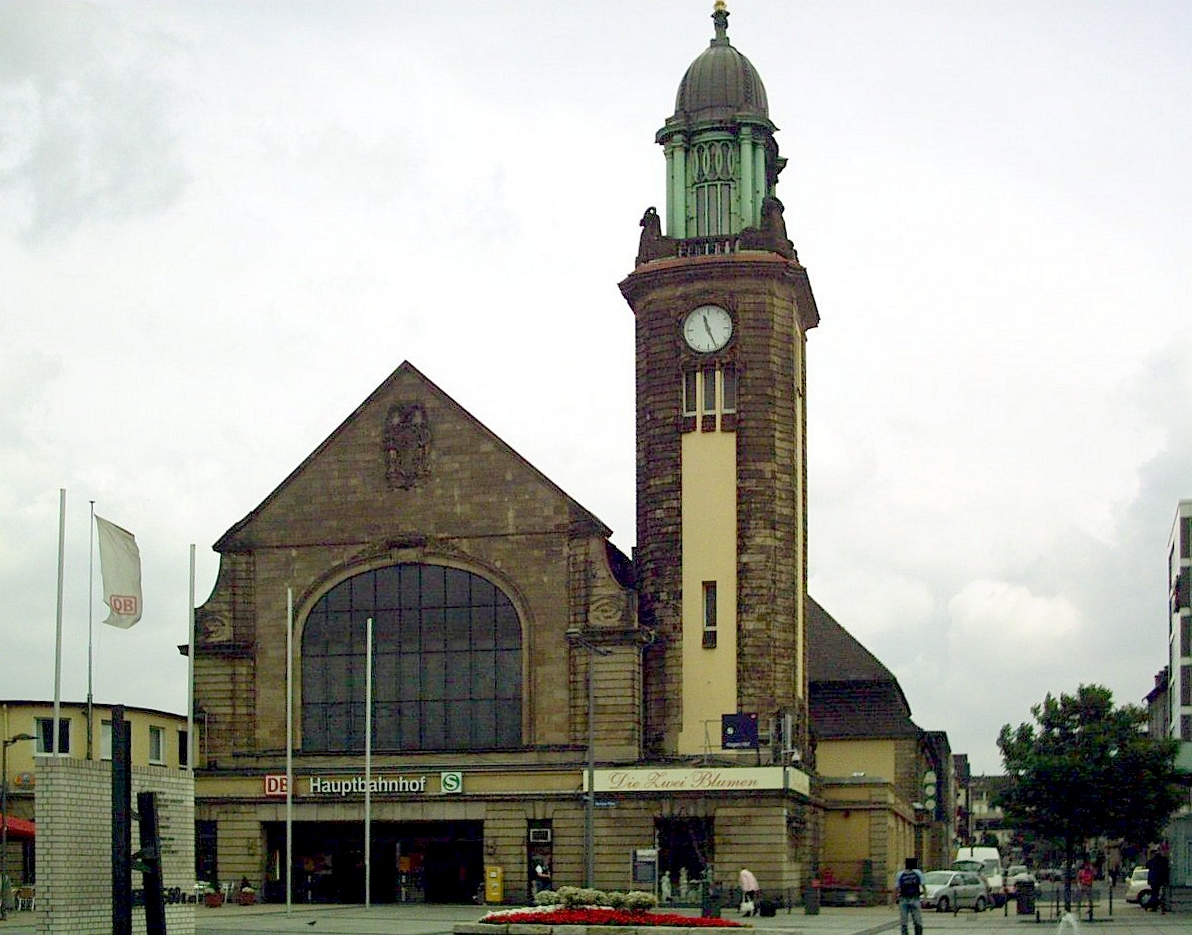
Hagen Hauptbahnhof

As late as 1980, express trains ran from Munich via Stuttgart and Frankfurt, over the Ruhr–Sieg line to Norddeich Mole. There were also individual coaches running from north Norddeich-Mole to Friedrichshafen on the Ruhr–Sieg line. Traditional stops for express trains were Hagen, Letmathe, Altena, Finnentrop, Lennestadt-Altenhundem, Kreuztal and Hüttental-Weidenau (now called Siegen-Weidenau).

In 1993 long-distance passenger traffic was converted from express trains to InterRegio trains, stopping regularly only in Hagen, Werdohl, Finnentrop, Altenhundem and Siegen-Weidenau. The long-distance passenger services were made up of several pairs of express train each day and later an Inter-Regio service from Norddeich Mole to Frankfurt, which was discontinued in the summer 2001 timetable.

=== Current operations ===
Even today, heavy freight trains need to be pushed by an additional locomotive from Altenhundem to Welschen Ennest. This locomotive then returns to Altenhundem. Before the electrification of the Ruhr–Sieg line almost all southward bound freight trains were pushed up to Welschen Ennest.

Regional-Express and Regionalbahn trains from Iserlohn and Siegen are coupled together in Iserlohn-Letmathe station, and continue as a unit via Hagen, Witten and Bochum to Essen. In the opposite direction, trains are uncoupled in Iserlohn-Letmathe station and then run separately to Siegen and Iserlohn.

Since the cessation of the InterRegio service from Frankfurt to Münster (with some continuing to Norddeich Mole) the double-track Giersberg tunnel in Siegen that connects the Ruhr–Sieg line with the Dill line and bypasses the main Siegen station is used only by freight trains. Further connecting curves and junctions in Hagen-Kabel and Hohensyburg allow the transport of freight between Gießen and the Ruhr region without reversal and bypassing Hagen Hauptbahnhof.

=== Development projects ===
It is proposed in the Federal Transport Infrastructure Plan to rebuild the Ruhr–Sieg and Dill lines as a line upgraded for high-speed (German: Ausbaustrecke, ABS) by 2015. In recent years, there has been a start to the improvement of the track, such as reconstruction of level crossings and long sections of line, the rationalisation of electronic interlocking equipment and related measures, such as the renewal of turnouts, track, overhead electrification and signals. The enlargement of tunnels, which has been planned for years is now being implemented, allowing the rerouting of some containerised freight from the Rhine lines (East Rhine and the West Rhine lines) to the Ruhr-Sieg line.

Moreover, the Ruhr–Sieg line is listed as a "second priority" in the Federal Transport Infrastructure Plan, depending on the growth of demand for freight transport, for such improvements as improving the steep grade on the Altenhundem–Welschen Ennest section.

In the last few years, almost all stations from Altena to Siegen-Weidenau have been modernised under a program of the state of North Rhine-Westphalia, including improvements of access for the disabled. Finnentrop station building was demolished for this reason in December 2007. The new station has same-platform access between trains and buses and it also has access for the disabled. This work was finished in 2017.

== Services ==
The Ruhr-Sieg line is served by:

- RE 16 (Ruhr-Lenne-Express), Essen - Hagen - Iserlohn (hourly)
- RE 34 (Dortmund–Siegerland-Express), Dortmund – Siegen (every 2 hours)
- RB 91 (Ruhr-Sieg-Bahn), Hagen - Iserlohn/Siegen (hourly)

IC 34 runs every 2 hours on the RE 34 route between Frankfurt and Munster, the two services together providing an hourly service. Regional tickets are valid on the IC 34 services between Dortmund and Siegen.

The Ruhr-Sieg line is also used by local rail freight.
