= Witten Hauptbahnhof =

Railway station in the town of Witten, Germany

Witten Hbf
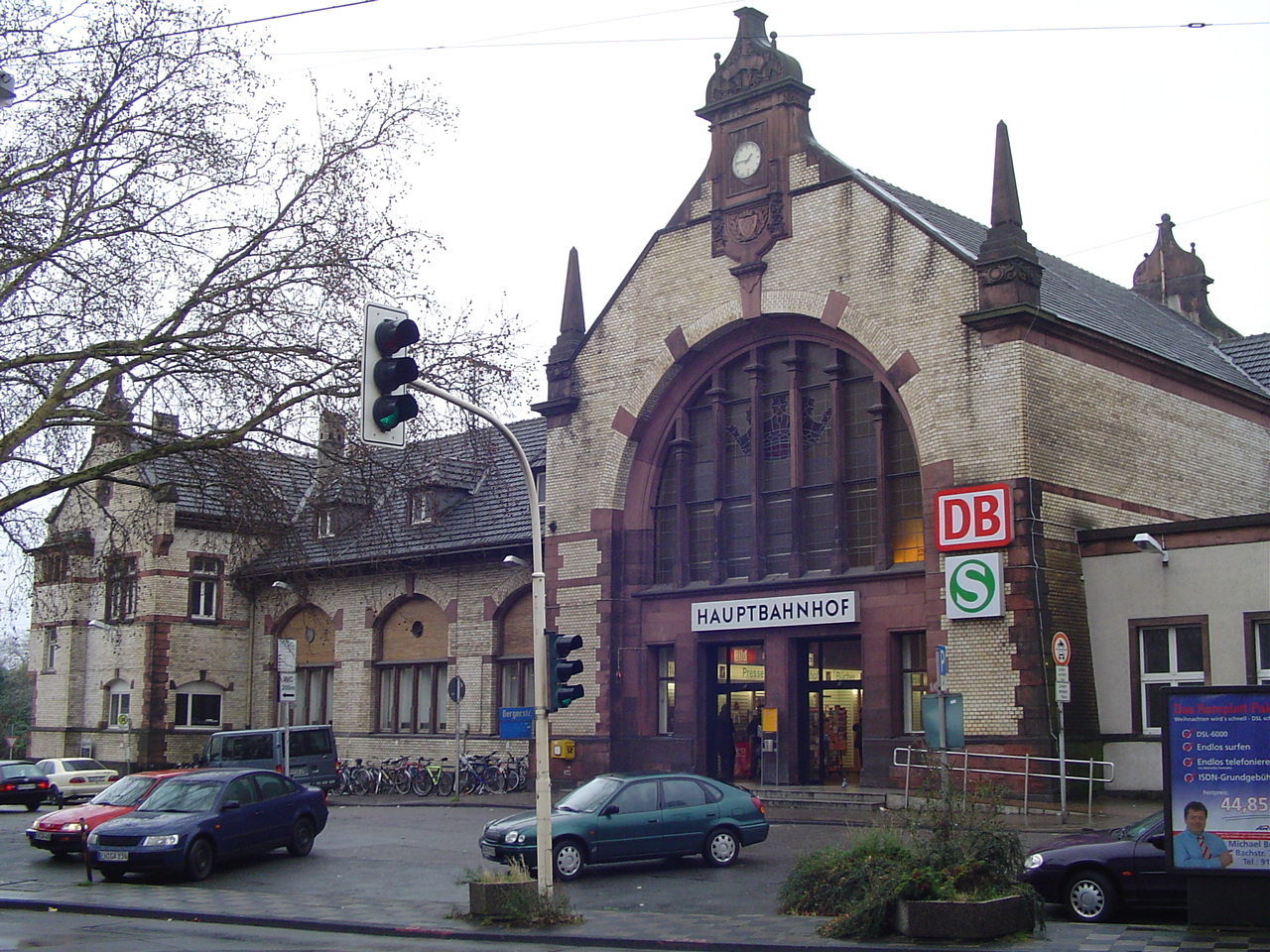

General information
- Location: Bergerstraße; 58452, Witten, NRW; Germany
- Coordinates: 51°26′07″N 7°19′46″E
- Owner: DB Netz
- Operator: DB Station&Service
- Lines: Witten–Oberhausen/Duisburg; Elberfeld–Dortmund; Witten–Wengern Ost/Schwelm
- Platforms: 4
- Train operators: DB Regio NRW; National Express

Construction
- Accessible: Yes
- Architect: Richard Sauerbruch

Other information
- Station code: 6822
- DS100 code: EWIT
- IBNR: 8000251
- Category: 3
- Fare zone: VRR: 470
- Website: www.bahnhof.de

History
- Opened: 9 March 1849 / 1901

Services
Preceding station	DB Fernverkehr	Following station
Dortmund Hbf towards Dortmund Hbf or Münster Hbf	IC 34	Iserlohn-Letmathe towards Frankfurt (Main) Hbf or Friedberg (Hess)
Preceding station	National Express Germany	Following station
Dortmund Hbf Terminus	RE 4 (Wupper-Express)	Wetter (Ruhr) towards Aachen Hbf
Preceding station	DB Regio NRW	Following station
Dortmund Hbf Terminus	RE 34	Iserlohn-Letmathe towards Siegen Hbf
Bochum Hbf towards Essen Hbf	RB 40	Wetter (Ruhr) towards Hagen Hbf
Preceding station	VIAS	Following station
Bochum Hbf towards Essen Hbf	RE 16	Wetter (Ruhr) towards Iserlohn
Preceding station	Rhine-Ruhr S-Bahn	Following station
Witten-Annen Nord towards Dortmund Hbf	S5	Wetter (Ruhr) towards Hagen Hbf
Location
- Location within North Rhine-Westphalia

Witten Hauptbahnhof is a railway station in the town of Witten in western Germany. It is situated southwest of the town.

In 1849 the station was opened as Witten West by the Bergisch-Märkische Eisenbahn-Gesellschaft. At the end of the 19th century the whole station was reconstructed, the new station building was designed by the architect Richard Witten Sauerbruch and opened in 1901. It is now part of The Industrial Heritage Trail (German: Route Industriekultur). In 1940 the station was renamed Witten Hauptbahnhof.

== History ==
Witten station was originally built as part of the Elberfeld–Dortmund trunk line of the Bergisch-Märkische Railway Company, which was opened on 20 December 1848, originally only for freight. On 26 October 1860, the BME began building its Ruhr route from this station.

Deutsche Reichsbahn opened a freight rail line through Witten-Höhe to Wengern Ost connecting with the Ruhr Valley Railway on 4 October 1926. In Witten-Höhe, the Witten–Wengern Ost/Schwelm railway branched off from 15 May 1934 to 30 November 1979, carrying passenger trains to Gevelsberg West and Schwelm. This line was permanently closed at the beginning of 1983. Passenger services continued through Wengern Ost to Hagen-Vorhalle for three years, but were also closed on 1 June 1986.

== Current situation ==
The section of the Elberfeld–Dortmund line to the south is used by both long distance and regional services, the section of the line to the north has, however, only been used by Rhine-Ruhr S-Bahn line S 5 since 1988.

The regional services stop in the station on the Witten/Dortmund–Oberhausen/Duisburg line to Essen Hauptbahnhof. Since 1988, long-distance services have run without stopping in Witten on the same route as well as on the faster line built via the Oberstraße Tunnel to Dortmund Hauptbahnhof.

The only lines still in operation on the south bank of the Ruhr (Witten Hbf to Witten-Höhe, Witten-Höhe to Wengern Ost, Wengern Ost to Hagen-Vorhalle) are now connected together as a through freight route.

In the 2026 timetable, the following regional services stop at the station:

Line	Line name	Route	Frequency
RE 4	Wupper-Express	Aachen – Mönchengladbach – Düsseldorf – Wuppertal – Hagen – Witten - Dortmund	60 min
RE 16	Ruhr-Lenne-Express	Essen – Bochum – Witten – Hagen – Letmathe (– Iserlohn)	60 min
IC 34		(Münster – Hamm –) Dortmund – Witten – Finnentrop – Siegen – Siegen – Dillenburg – Wetzlar – Bad Nauheim – Frankfurt / Friedberg (Hess)	5 train pairs
RE 34	Dortmund–Siegerland-Express	(Dortmund – Witten – Hagen –) Iserlohn-Letmathe – Werdohl – Kreuztal – Siegen	60 or 120 min
RB 40	Ruhr-Lenne-Bahn	Essen – Bochum – Witten – Hagen	60 min
S5	Rhine-Ruhr S-Bahn	Dortmund – Witten (– Wetter (Ruhr) – Hagen)	30 min

The tram lines 309 and 310 stops nearby Witten Hbf at the stop Witten Bahnhofstraße. The new line 309 runs between Heven Dorf and Bochum-Langendreer S.

Line name	Route
309	Bochum Langendreer S – Witten Rathaus – Witten Bahnhofstraße - Heven Dorf

Line name	Route
310	Bochum-Höntrop Kirche – Bochum Hbf – Witten Rathaus – Witten Bahnhofstraße - Heven Dorf

The bus junction is served by the express bus route SB38 (Ennepetal - Gevelsberg - Wetter - Witten - Hattingen) and city bus lines 320, 371, 375, 376, 379 and 592. At night (weekend) the junction is also served by the night buses NE17 and NE18. All cities closed-by Witten can be reached.
