= Ruhr-Lenne-Express =

Regional-Express service in the German state of North Rhine-Westphalia

RE 16 Ruhr-Lenne-Express
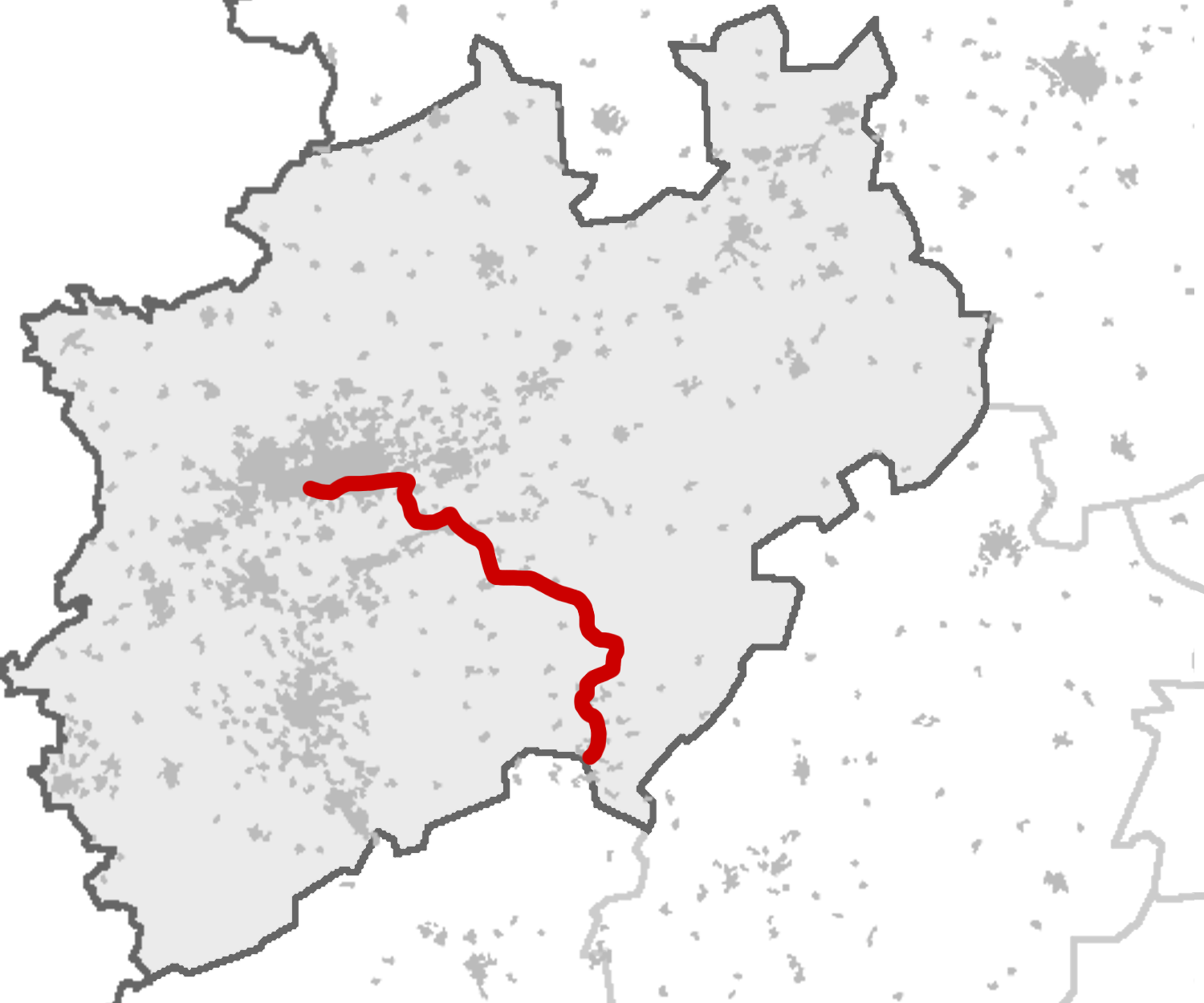

Overview
- Locale: North Rhine-Westphalia, Germany

Service
- Route number: 415, 427, 440
- Operator(s): VIAS Rail

Technical
- Line length: 153 km (95 mi)
- Operating speed: 140 km/h (87 mph) (maximum)

The Ruhr-Lenne-Express (RE 16) is a Regional-Express service in the German state of North Rhine-Westphalia, running from Essen via Bochum, Witten, Bochum, Hagen and Iserlohn-Letmathe to Iserlohn. It is operated by VIAS Rail hourly.

== History ==
In the summer of 2001, DB Reise&Touristik abandoned InterRegio line 22, which ran from Frankfurt on the Ruhr–Sieg railway to Düsseldorf (until the summer of 1999 to Münster), continuing once a day to Norddeich Mole). The RE 16 (Ruhr-Sieg-Express) service was established to replace it from the timetable change of 10 June 2001 by the transport association of the Rhine-Ruhr, Ruhr-Lippe and Westfalen-Süd. The newly created service ran initially via Siegen to Au (Sieg); this branch was taken over in December 2002 by the RB 95 (Sieg-Dill-Bahn) service operated by Deutsche Bahn and operated since December 2004 under the brand name of DreiLänderBahn.

In 2004, the operations of the RE 16 was tendered together with the RB 40 (Ruhr-Lenne-Bahn), RB 56 (Der Iserlohner) and RB 91 (Ruhr-Sieg-Bahn) services as the Ruhr-Sieg network. The tender was won by Abellio Rail and the operations of the tendered lines was awarded for twelve years from 9 December 2007. With the commencement of Abellio services, Welschen Ennest was added as a stop.

After Abellio went bankrupt, the line has been operated by DB Regio again since 1 February 2022.

When the timetable changed in December 2022, the former branch from Iserlohn-Letmathe to Siegen was taken over by the new RE 34 (Dortmund–Siegerland-Express). Since then, there has been no splitting of trains in Letmathe. Because the trains now only run between Essen and Iserlohn, the line was renamed the "Ruhr-Lenne-Express". RE 16 and RE 34 leave Letmathe at intervals of a few minutes one after the other. From Siegen to Hagen and vice versa, it is possible to change trains in Letmathe on the same platform.

== Route ==
The Ruhr-Sieg-Express runs daily every hour and utilises four railway lines built by the Bergisch-Märkische Railway Company:

- the Ruhr line from Essen to Witten, using the long-distance tracks, which is also used by regional and long-distance trains,
- the Elberfeld–Dortmund railway from Witten to Hagen
- the Ruhr–Sieg railway from Hagen to Iserlohn-Letmathe and
- the Letmathe–Fröndenberg railway from Iserlohn-Letmathe to Iserlohn.

== Future ==
There are plans, with the introduction of the Rhine-Ruhr Express (RRX) network commenced in 2020, for the Ruhr-Sieg-Express and the Ruhr-Lenne-Bahn services to run between Essen and Bochum on the S-Bahn route via Wattenscheid-Höntrop instead of on the main line via Wattenscheid. The Ruhr-Lenne-Bahn would then run via Essen-Steele rather than Essen-Kray Süd.

== NRW regular interval timetable ==
The Ruhr-Sieg-Express is operated under the integrated regular-interval timetable of North Rhine-Westphalia, called NRW-Takt, under which trains arrive at major interchange stations at roughly the same time in order to facilitate transfers.

To supplement services in parallel with the Ruhr-Sieg-Express, two Regionalbahn services are operated, the Ruhr-Lenne-Bahn (RB 40) between Essen and Hagen and the Ruhr-Sieg-Bahn (RB 91) between Hagen and Siegen/Iserlohn. Due to the different number of intermediate stops for the different services, the combined services only provides stops at stations served by the express trains at approximately 30-minute intervals.

In Siegen, the Ruhr-Sieg-Express has regular-interval connections with the Rhein-Sieg-Express (RE 9) towards Cologne, the Sieg-Dill-Bahn (RB 95) to Au (Sieg) and Dillenburg, as well as the Main-Sieg-Express (RE 99) to Gießen, continuing every two hours to Frankfurt.

There are other connections in Iserlohn to the Ardey-Bahn (RB 53) to Dortmund and in Finnentrop to the Biggesee-Express (RB 92) to Olpe. In Iserlohn-Letmathe, it is a possible to change from services from Siegen to services to Iserlohn and vice versa each hour.

Coming from Siegen/Iserlohn on the RE 16, it is possible to change in Hagen to the Volmetal-Bahn (RB 52) to Dortmund and Lüdenscheid, the Maas-Wupper-Express (RE 13) to Hamm and Venlo, the Sauerland-Express (RE 17) to Warburg and long-distance services to Bremen/Hamburg and Hannover/Leipzig.

== Rolling Stock ==
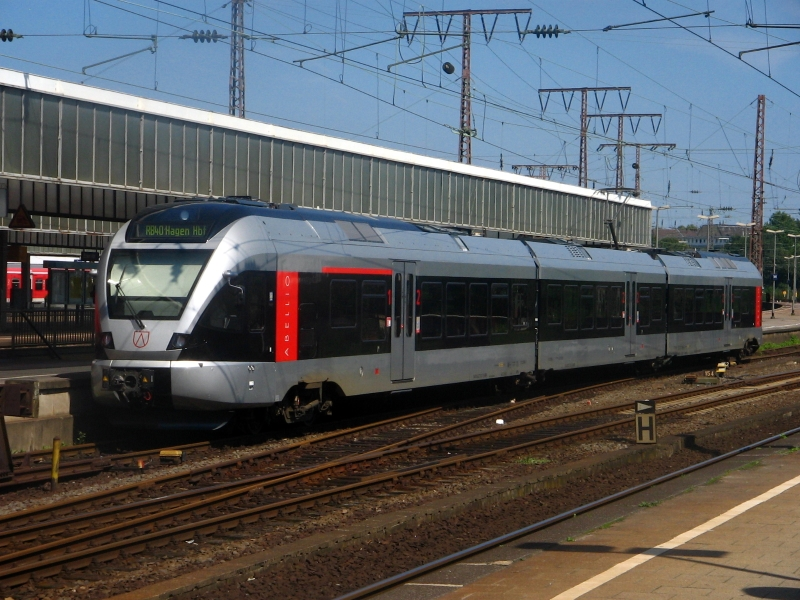
A FLIRT set of Abellio in Essen Hbf, here running as RB 40: Ruhr-Lenne-Bahn

In the early days of the Ruhr-Sieg-Express it was mainly operated with class 425 electric multiple units, but later the rolling stock used varied considerably.

So sometimes two class 426 EMUs were coupled, sometimes a class 425 and a class 426 set were coupled and sometimes singled sets were operated. Occasionally a triple set of class 426 was operated, which sometimes caused problems. In the last weeks before the change of operator this often occurred, as the class 425 sets were no longer used.

The use of both classes ended at the timetable change on 9 December 2007, when Abellio Rail NRW took over operations on the line with two-and three-part Stadler FLIRT EMUs. The EMUs were taken over by DB Regio after the change of operator in February 2022 and are continuing to be used. The line has been operated by Vias since 10 December 2023, using the same FLIRT EMUs.

== See also ==
- List of regional rail lines in North Rhine-Westphalia
