= Hagen Hauptbahnhof =

Railway station serving the city of Hagen in western Germany

Hagen Hbf
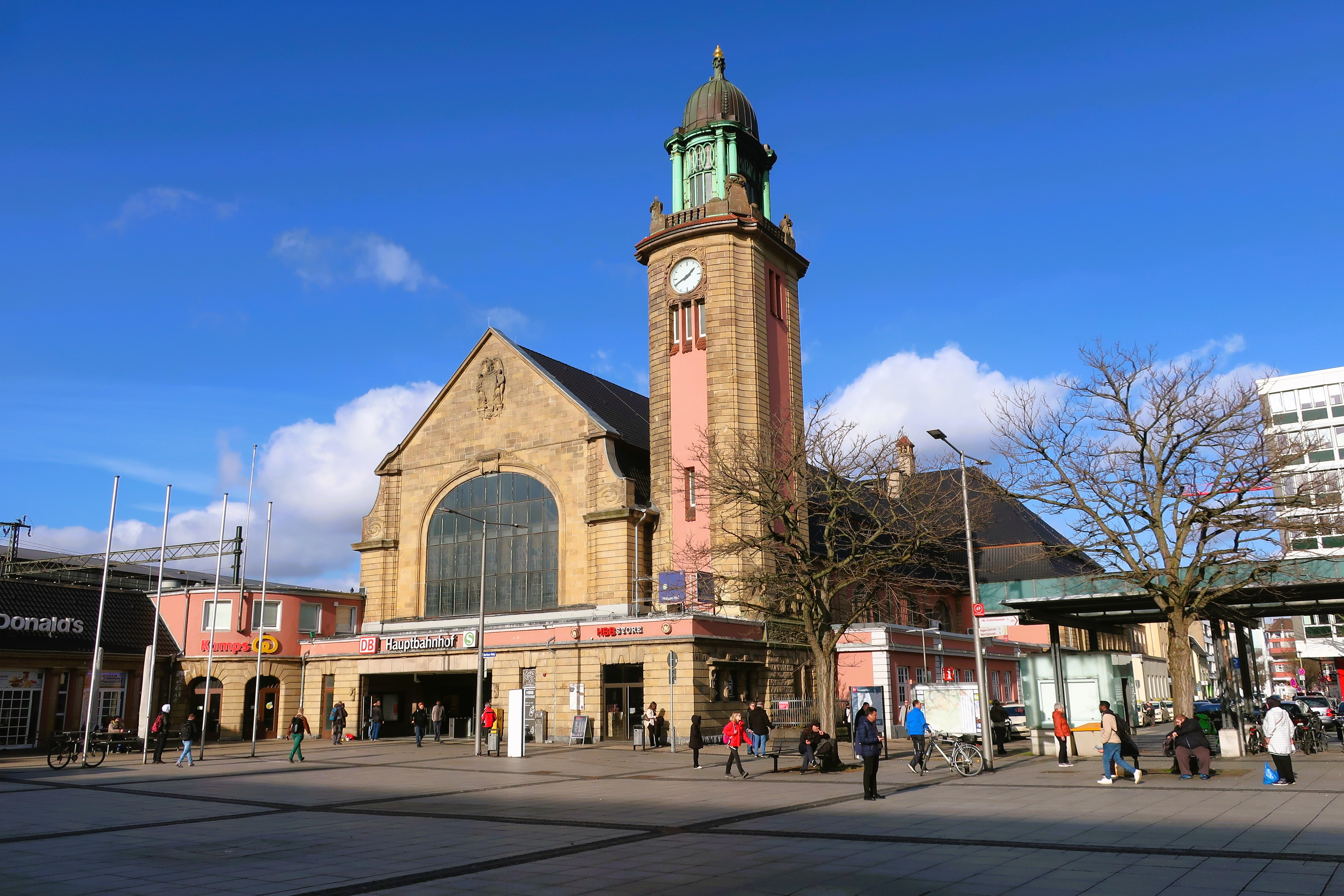
- The station hall

General information
- Location: Berliner Platz 1, Hagen, North Rhine-Westphalia; Germany
- Coordinates: 51°21′44″N 7°27′39″E
- Owner: Deutsche Bahn
- Operator: DB Netz; DB Station&Service
- Lines: Elberfeld–Dortmund; Hagen–Dieringhausen; Hagen–Warburg; Hagen–Siegen; Hagen–Hamm
- Platforms: 16

Construction
- Accessible: Yes
- Architectural style: Baroque Revival

Other information
- Station code: 2457
- DS100 code: EHG
- IBNR: 8000142
- Category: 2
- Fare zone: VRR: 580
- Website: www.bahnhof.de

History
- Opened: 9 March 1849, rebuilt 1910

Passengers
- 30,000 daily
Services
| Preceding station | DB Fernverkehr | Following station |
|---|---|---|
| Wuppertal Hbf towards Köln Hbf | ICE 10 | Hamm (Westf) Hbf towards Berlin Ostbahnhof |
| Wuppertal Hbf towards Koblenz Hbf | ICE 19 | Hamm (Westf) Hbf towards Berlin Ostbahnhof |
| Wuppertal Hbf towards Stuttgart Hbf or Tübingen Hbf | IC 55 | Dortmund Hbf towards Dresden Hbf |
| Wuppertal Hbf towards Wien Hbf | ICE 91 | Dortmund Hbf Terminus |
| Preceding station | National Express Germany | Following station |
| Ennepetal towards Aachen Hbf | RE 4 (Wupper-Express) | Wetter (Ruhr) towards Dortmund Hbf |
| Ennepetal towards Krefeld Hbf | RE 7 (Rhein-Münsterland-Express) | Schwerte towards Rheine |
| Preceding station | | Following station |
| Ennepetal towards Venlo | RE 13 | Schwerte towards Hamm (Westf) Hbf |
| Preceding station | VIAS | Following station |
| Wetter (Ruhr) towards Essen Hbf | RE 16 | Hagen-Hohenlimburg towards Iserlohn |
| Preceding station | DB Regio NRW | Following station |
| Terminus | RE 17 | Schwerte towards Kassel-Wilhelmshöhe |
| Hagen-Vorhalle towards Essen Hbf | RB 40 | Terminus |
| Herdecke towards Dortmund Hbf | RB 52 | Hagen-Oberhagen towards Lüdenscheid |
| Terminus | RB 91 | Hagen-Hohenlimburg towards Siegen Hbf |
| Preceding station | Rhine-Ruhr S-Bahn | Following station |
| Hagen-Vorhalle towards Dortmund Hbf | S5 | Terminus |
| Hagen-Wehringhausen towards Mönchengladbach Hbf | S8 | Terminus |
| Hagen-Wehringhausen towards Haltern am See or Recklinghausen Hbf | S9 | Terminus |
Location

Hagen Hauptbahnhof is a railway station serving the city of Hagen in western Germany. It is an important rail hub for the southeastern Ruhr area, offering regional and long distance connections. The station was opened in 1848 as part of the Bergisch-Märkische Railway Company's Elberfeld–Dortmund line and is one of the few stations in the Ruhr valley to retain its original station hall, which dates back to 1910.

== History ==
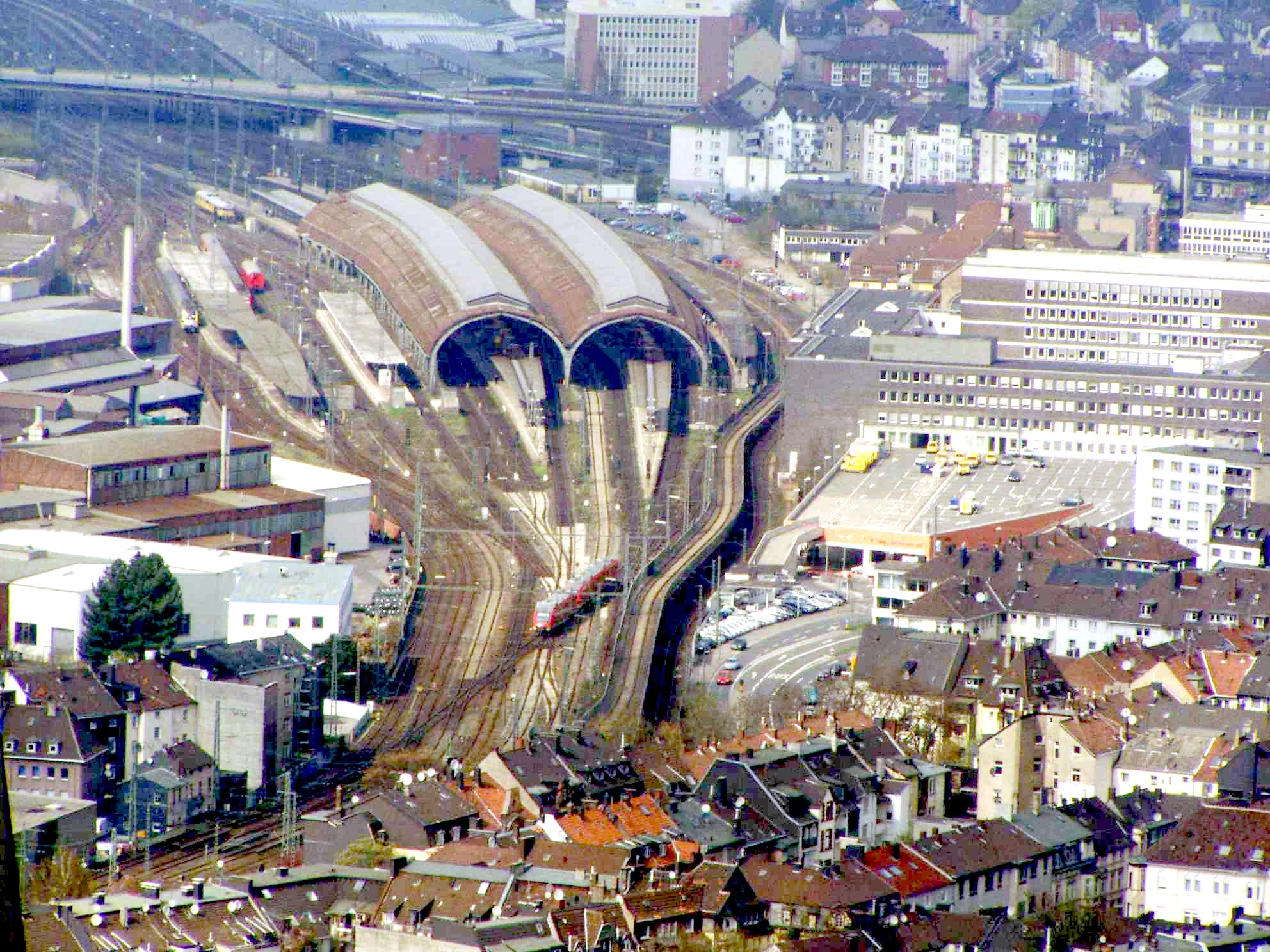
Hagen Hauptbahnhof from the air

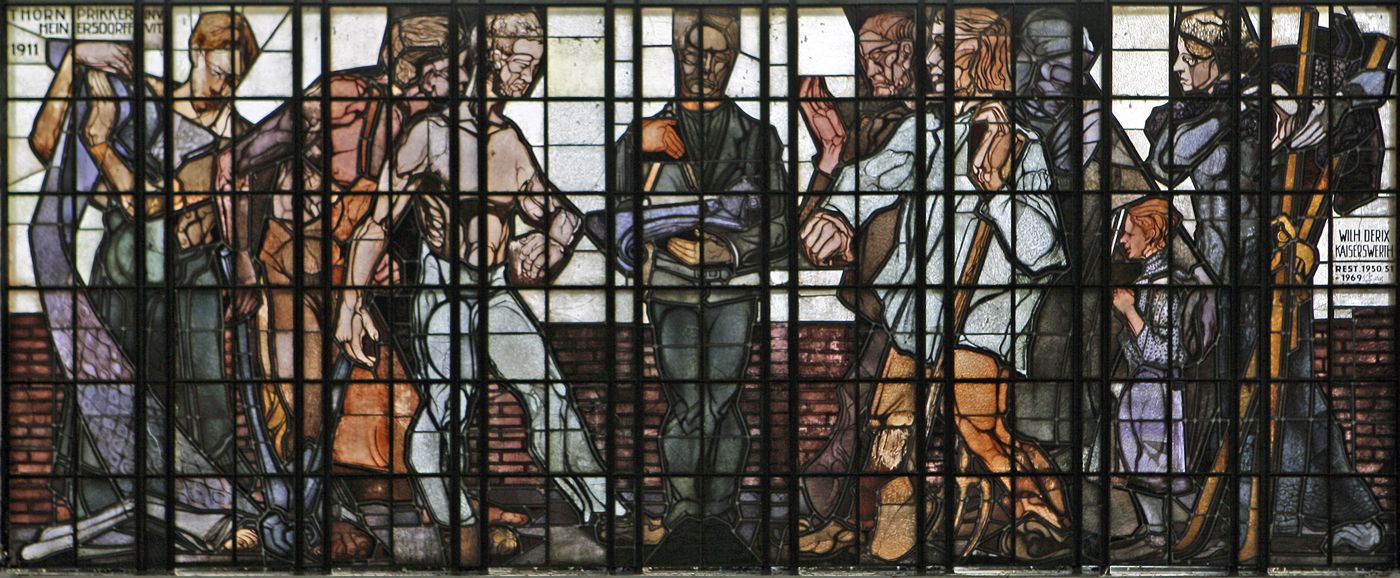
Thorn-Prikker: Der Künstler als Lehrer für Handel und Gewerbe (1911)

The original Elberfeld–Dortmund trunk line of the Bergisch-Märkische Railway Company was completed in 1848/49 linking Hagen to the rapidly expanding Prussian railway network. This led to Hagen quickly becoming an industrial city based steel and metal production. After the opening of the Ruhr–Sieg railway to Siegen via Altena in 1861 the city also became an important railway junction.

The Baroque Revival entrance building, opened on 14 September 1910, was built of brick and partly covered with sandstone. It survived bombing during the Second World War, although not completely, in contrast to other stations in the Ruhr area, so it can be admired today. A stained-glass window called The Artist as Teacher of Trade and Industry (German: Der Künstler als Lehrer für Handel und Gewerbe) by Johan Thorn Prikker was installed above the entrance by Karl Ernst Osthaus in 1911.

Also preserved is a two-span train shed designed by Stephany from 1910. It was restored in the 1990s and is heritage-listed as an important example of a steel-constructed hall developed in the late 19th century. It is the only remaining station with a "traditional" platform area in Westphalia and the Ruhr region and one of a few of its kind in Germany. The heavy Anglo-American bombing raids in World War II on Hagen did not destroy it, unlike many other railway stations in the Ruhr.

The station has points and overtaking tracks connecting to the two main platforms in the train shed. This allows up to four (short) trains to operate from each of these two-edged platforms. This has the disadvantage that passengers may sometimes be required to walk long distances.

The interior of the station was painstakingly restored from the autumn of 2004 to May 2006. Thus, the barrel vault over the concourse has been reconstructed, restoring some of its old lustre and details, including Thorn Prikker's stained-glass window, are now illuminated by daylight and are again clearly visible. This work was carried out for the 2006 World Cup of football at a total cost of €1.2 million.

The Hagen Hauptbahnhof is a listed building and is part of The Industrial Heritage Trail (Route Industriekultur).

== Rail services ==
The station serves as an important link between long distance services; the InterCityExpress lines linking Cologne and Berlin call at the station as well as various InterCity and EuroCity services. In the 2026 timetable, the following services stopped at the station:

| Line | Route | Frequency | Operator |
|---|---|---|---|
| ICE 10 | Berlin East – Hanover – Bielefeld – Hamm – Hagen – Wuppertal – Cologne | 120 min | DB Fernverkehr |
| ICE 19 | Berlin East – Hanover – Bielefeld – Hagen – Wuppertal – Cologne (– Bonn – Andernach – Koblenz) | 120 min | DB Fernverkehr |
| ICE 42 | (Hamburg-Altona – Münster –) Dortmund – Hagen – Wuppertal – Solingen – Cologne – Siegburg (Bonn) – Frankfurt Airport – Mannheim – Stuttgart – Ulm – Augsburg – Munich | 1 train | DB Fernverkehr |
| ICE 55; IC 55 | Dresden – Leipzig – Halle – Hannover – Hamm – Dortmund – Hagen – Wuppertal – Solingen – Cologne – Bonn – Koblenz – Mainz – Mannheim – Heidelberg – Vaihingen (Enz) – Stuttgart (– Reutlingen – Tübingen) | 120 min | DB Fernverkehr |
| ICE 91 | Dortmund – Hagen – Wuppertal – Solingen – Cologne – Koblenz – Frankfurt Airport – Frankfurt Airport – Würzburg – Nuremberg – Passau – Linz – Vienna | 2 train pairs | DB Fernverkehr |

=== Regional and S-Bahn trains ===
Hagen Hbf lies within the area of the Verkehrsverbund Rhein-Ruhr transport association and is served by several RegionalExpress and RegionalBahn lines as well as by three S-Bahn services of the Rhein-Ruhr S-Bahn network. In the 2026 timetable, the following Regional-Express, Regionalbahn and S-Bahn services stopped at the station:

| Line | Route | Frequency |
|---|---|---|
| RE 4 Wupper-Express | Aachen – Mönchengladbach – Düsseldorf – Wuppertal – Hagen – Dortmund | 60 mins |
| RE 7 Rhein-Münsterland-Express | Krefeld – Neuss – Cologne – Solingen – Wuppertal – Hagen – Hamm – Münster (Westf) – Rheine | 60 mins |
| RE 13; Maas-Wupper-Express | Venlo – Viersen – Mönchengladbach – Düsseldorf – Wuppertal – Hagen – Hamm | 60 mins |
| RE 16; Ruhr-Lenne-Express | Essen – Bochum – Witten – Hagen – Iserlohn-Letmathe – Iserlohn | 60 min |
| RE 17; Sauerland-Express | Hagen – Schwerte – Arnsberg (Westf) – Brilon-Wald – Warburg (–Kassel Hbf – Kassel-Wilhelmshöhe) | 60 min |
| RB 40; Rhein-Niers-Bahn | Essen – Wattenscheid – Bochum – Witten – Wetter – Hagen | 60 mins |
| RB 52; Volmetal-Bahn | Lüdenscheid – Lüdenscheid-Brügge – Schalksmühle – Hagen – Dortmund | 60 mins |
| RB 91; Ruhr-Sieg-Bahn | Hagen – Letmathe – Finnentrop – Siegen | 60 mins |
| S5 | Dortmund – Witten – Wetter (Ruhr) – Hagen | 60 mins |
| S8 | Hagen – Gevelsberg – Wuppertal-Oberbarmen – Wuppertal – Düsseldorf – Neuss – Mönchengladbach | 60 mins |
| S9 | Hagen – Gevelsberg – Schwelm – Wuppertal – Velbert-Langenberg – Essen – Bottrop – Gladbeck - Recklinghausen | 60 mins |

== See also ==
- Rail transport in Germany
- Railway stations in Germany
