= S5 (Rhine-Ruhr S-Bahn) =

S-Bahn line in the Rhine-Ruhr network, Germany

Line S 5 is a S-Bahn line in the Rhine-Ruhr network. It is operated by DB Regio. It runs from Dortmund Hbf via Witten Hbf to Hagen Hbf. There are current plans to expand the line by building five new stations. It is operated between Dortmund and Witten at 30-minute intervals and between Witten and Hagen at 60-minute intervals using Alstom Coradia Continental type 1440.3 and class 422.

Line S 5 runs over the Elberfeld–Dortmund railway opened by the Bergisch-Märkische Railway Company on 20 December 1848.

S-Bahn services commenced on the whole length of the route on 29 May 1994.
