= Dortmund-Germania station =

Railway station in Dortmund, Germany

Dortmund Germania
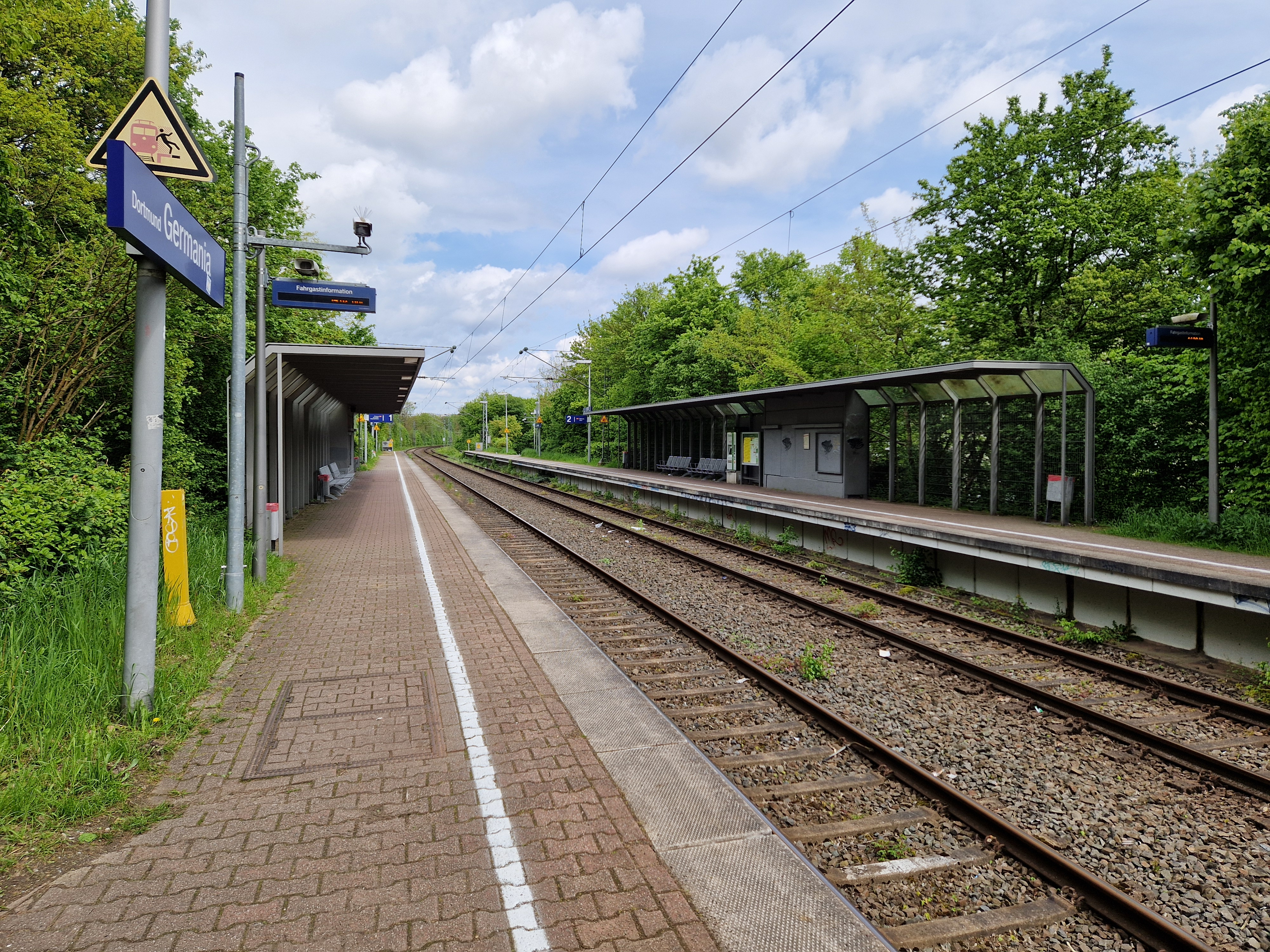

General information
- Location: Steinhammerstr. Dortmund, NRW; Germany
- Coordinates: 51°29′54″N 7°21′50″E
- Owner: DB Netz
- Operator: DB Station&Service
- Lines: Luetkendortmund–Dortmund (KBS 450.4)
- Platforms: 2
- Train operators: DB Regio NRW

Construction
- Accessible: Yes

Other information
- Station code: 1288
- DS100 code: EDGM
- Category: 6
- Fare zone: VRR: 374
- Website: www.bahnhof.de

History
- Opened: 30 August 1987

Services
Preceding station	Rhine-Ruhr S-Bahn	Following station
DO-Somborn towards DO-Lütgendortmund	S4	DO-Marten Süd towards Unna
Location
- Location within North Rhine-Westphalia

Dortmund-Germania station is a railway station in the Dortmund district of Marten in the German state of North Rhine-Westphalia. It was named Lütgendortmund (now used for a different station) and renamed Dortmund-Germania after the nearby Zeche Germania, a former colliery, on 29 May 1988. It is classified by Deutsche Bahn as a category 6 station and was opened on 30 August 1987 on a new line completed between Dortmund-Dorstfeld and Germania on 3 June 1984 and electrified between Dortmund-Marten Süd and Germania on 28 August 1987.

It is served by Rhine-Ruhr S-Bahn line S 4 at 30-minute intervals (15-minute intervals in the peak between Dortmund-Lütgendortmund and Unna-Königsborn). It is served by bus routes 440 (Oespel - Barop - Hörde - Aplerbeck), every 20 minutes), 462 (Lütgendortmund – Bövinghausen – Kirchlinde – Huckarde + Marten - Barop), every 20 minutes), 463 (Lütgendortmund – Volksgarten + Marten), every 60 minutes) and 470 (Mengede – Westerfilde – Lütgendortmund + Kley – Oespel (– 440 Barop)), every 20 minutes), operated by DSW21.
