= Dortmund-Marten Süd station =

Railway station in Dortmund, Germany

Dortmund Marten Süd
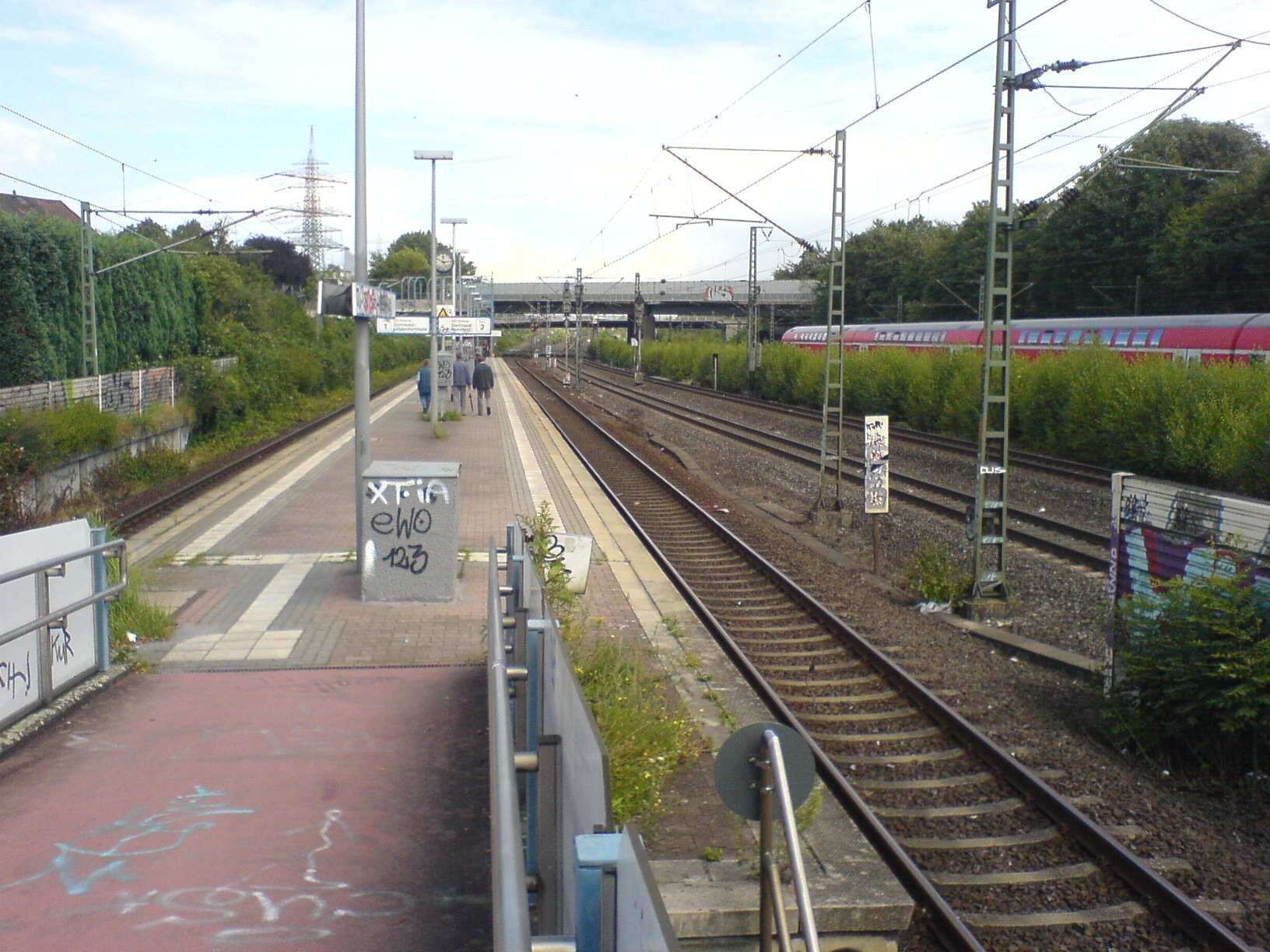

General information
- Location: Schulte Heuthaus-Str. Dortmund, NRW; Germany
- Coordinates: 51°30′28″N 7°23′15″E
- Owner: DB Netz
- Operator: DB Station&Service
- Lines: Lütgendortmund–Dortmund (KBS 450.4)
- Platforms: 2
- Train operators: DB Regio NRW

Construction
- Accessible: Yes

Other information
- Station code: 1319
- DS100 code: EDMS
- IBNR: 8001542
- Category: 6
- Fare zone: VRR: 374
- Website: www.bahnhof.de

History
- Opened: 30 May 1964

Services
| Preceding station | Rhine-Ruhr S-Bahn | Following station |
|---|---|---|
| DO-Germania towards DO-Lütgendortmund | S4 | DO-Dorstfeld towards Unna |
| Preceding station | Rhine-Ruhr Stadtbahn | Following station |
| Walbertstraße Terminus | U44 | Auf dem Brümmer towards Westfalenhütte |
Location
- Location within North Rhine-Westphalia

Dortmund-Marten Süd station is a railway station in the Dortmund district of Marten in the German state of North Rhine-Westphalia. It is classified by Deutsche Bahn as a category 6 station and was opened on 30 May 1964. It is now located on a new line completed between Dortmund-Dorstfeld and Germania on 3 June 1984 and electrified between Dortmund-Marten Süd station and Germania on 28 August 1987.

It is served by Rhine-Ruhr S-Bahn line S 4 at 30-minute intervals (15-minute intervals in the peak between Dortmund-Lütgendortmund and Unna-Königsborn). It is served by Dortmund Stadtbahn line U 44 (Dorstfeld – Kampstr – Borsigplatz – Westfalenhütte) at 10-minute intervals. It is also served by bus routes 462 (Germania – Lütgendortmund – Bövinghausen – Kirchlinde – Huckarde + Uni - Barop), every 20 minutes), 463 (Germania – Lütgendortmund – Volksgarten + Marten), every 60 minutes), 464 (Feldgarten – Lütgendortmund), every 30 minutes), 466 (Dorstfeld – Bandelstr), every 20 minutes) and 480 (Kirchlinde – Schwerin – Castrop-Rauxel - Ickern), every 20 minutes), operated by DSW21.
