= Dortmund West station =

Railway station in Dortmund, Germany

Dortmund-West
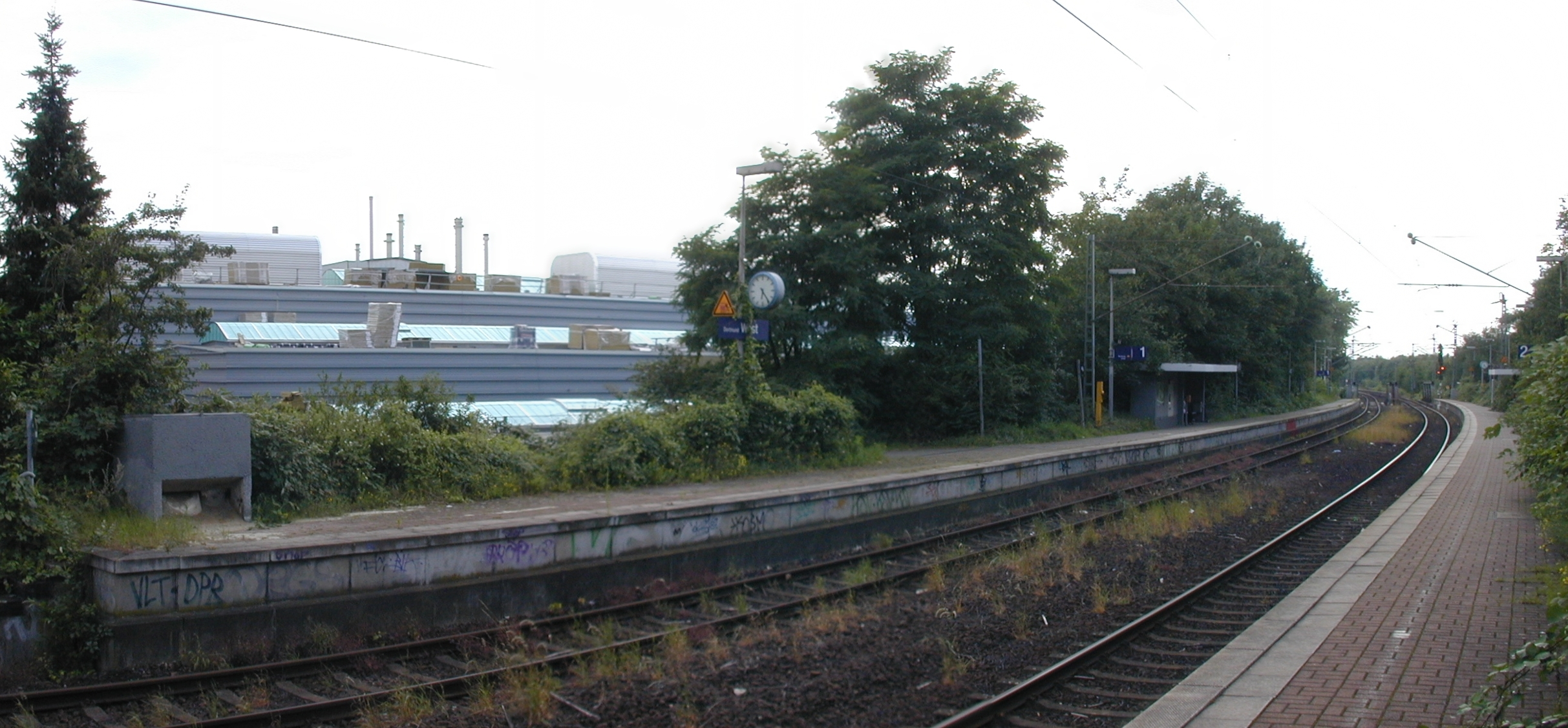

General information
- Location: Lange Str., Dortmund, NRW; Germany
- Coordinates: 51°30′35″N 7°26′19″E
- Owner: DB Netz
- Operator: DB Station&Service
- Lines: Lütgendortmund–Dortmund (KBS 450.4)
- Platforms: 2
- Train operators: DB Regio NRW

Construction
- Accessible: Yes

Other information
- Station code: 1296
- DS100 code: EDW
- IBNR: 8003946
- Category: 6
- Fare zone: VRR: 370
- Website: www.bahnhof.de

History
- Opened: 3 June 1984

Services
Preceding station	Rhine-Ruhr S-Bahn	Following station
DO-Dorstfeld towards DO-Lütgendortmund	S4	DO Möllerbrücke towards Unna
Location
- Location within North Rhine-Westphalia

Dortmund West station is a railway station in the Dortmund district of Marten in the German state of North Rhine-Westphalia. It is classified by Deutsche Bahn as a category 6 station. It was opened on 3 June 1984 on the Osterath–Dortmund Süd railway completed between the old Dortmund-Dorstfeld station and the old Dortmund Süd (south) station by the Rhenish Railway Company on 19 November 1874 and electrified on 25 May 1984. It is proposed to build platforms on the Elberfeld–Dortmund railway to provide interchange with S-Bahn line S 5.

It is served by Rhine-Ruhr S-Bahn line S 4 at 30-minute intervals (15-minute intervals in the peak between Dortmund-Lütgendortmund and Unna-Königsborn).

It is also served by bus routes 452 (Saarlandstr – Funkenburg – Spähenfelde + Dortmund Hbf (475 – Mengede)), every 30 minutes) and 453 (Saarlandstr – Märkische Str – Schüren + Dortmund Hbf – Anne-Frank-GS), every 30 minutes), both operated by DSW21.
