= Dortmund-Somborn station =

Railway station in Dortmund, Germany

Dortmund Somborn
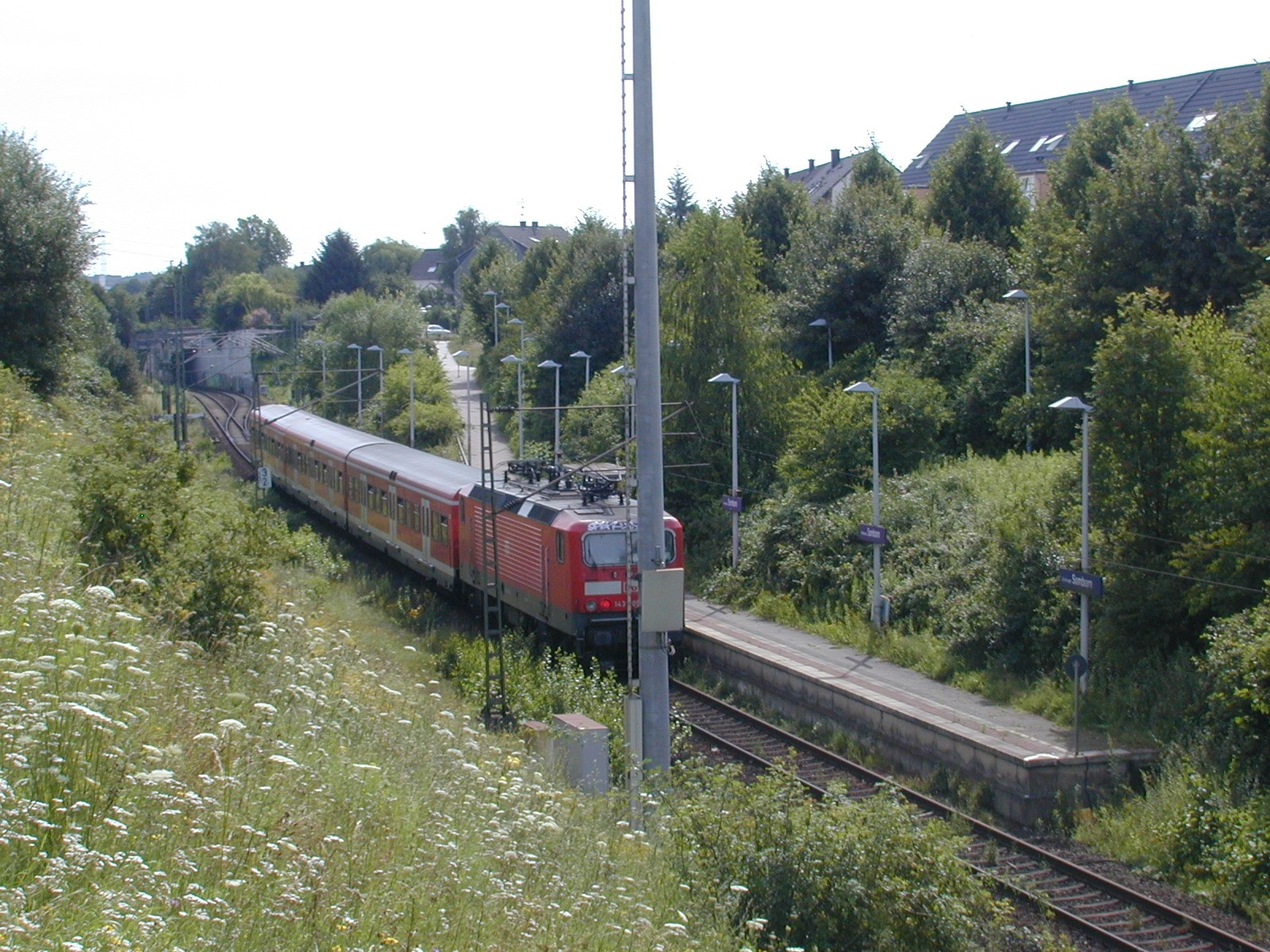

General information
- Location: Dortmund, NRW; Germany
- Coordinates: 51°29′45″N 7°21′03″E
- Owner: DB Netz
- Operator: DB Station&Service
- Lines: Lütgendortmund–Dortmund (KBS 450.4)
- Platforms: 1
- Train operators: DB Regio NRW

Construction
- Accessible: Yes

Other information
- Station code: 396
- DS100 code: EDSM
- Category: 6
- Fare zone: VRR: 374
- Website: www.bahnhof.de

History
- Opened: 23 May 1993

Services
Preceding station	Rhine-Ruhr S-Bahn	Following station
DO-Lütgendortmund Terminus	S4	DO-Germania towards Unna
Location
- Location within North Rhine-Westphalia

Dortmund-Somborn station is a railway station in the Dortmund district of Somborn in the German state of North Rhine-Westphalia. It is classified by Deutsche Bahn as a category 6 station. It was opened on 23 May 1993 on a new line completed on the same date between Dortmund-Germania and Dortmund Lütgendortmund.

It is served by Rhine-Ruhr S-Bahn line S 4 at 30-minute intervals (15-minute intervals in the peak between Dortmund-Lütgendortmund and Unna-Königsborn).
