= Dortmund-Wischlingen station =

Railway station in Dortmund, Germany

Dortmund Wischlingen
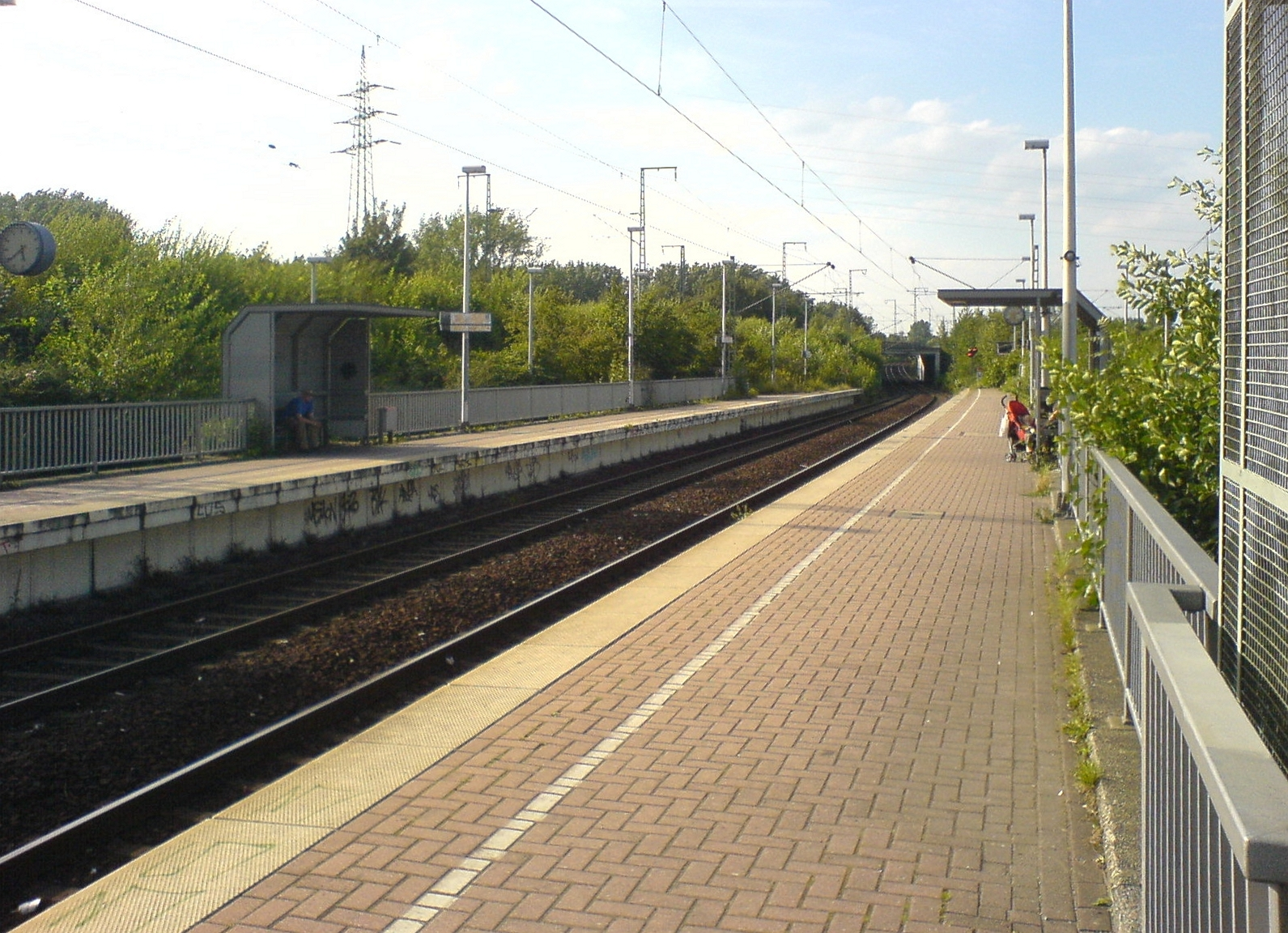
- Dortmund-Wischlingen station in 2007

General information
- Location: Höfkerstr., Dortmund, NRW; Germany
- Coordinates: 51°31′09″N 7°24′46″E
- Line: Welver–Sterkrade railway
- Platforms: 2

Construction
- Accessible: Yes

Other information
- Station code: 1329
- DS100 code: EDOL
- IBNR: 8001531
- Category: 6
- Fare zone: VRR: 376
- Website: www bahnhof.de

History
- Opened: 2 June 1991

Services
Preceding station	Rhine-Ruhr S-Bahn	Following station
DO-Huckarde towards Essen Hbf or Recklinghausen Hbf	S2	DO-Dorstfeld towards Dortmund Hbf
Location

Dortmund-Wischlingen is a railway station on the Welver–Sterkrade railway situated in Dortmund in western Germany. It is classified by Deutsche Bahn as a category 6 station. It is served by Rhine-Ruhr S-Bahn line S2 every 30 minutes.

It is also served by bus routes 447 (Huckarde + Dorstfeld - Uni - Hombruch - Wellinghofen - Hacheney) and 465 (Huckarde + Dorstfeld - Universität - Oespel), both operated by DSW21.
