= Dortmund University station =

Railway station in Dortmund, Germany

Dortmund Universität
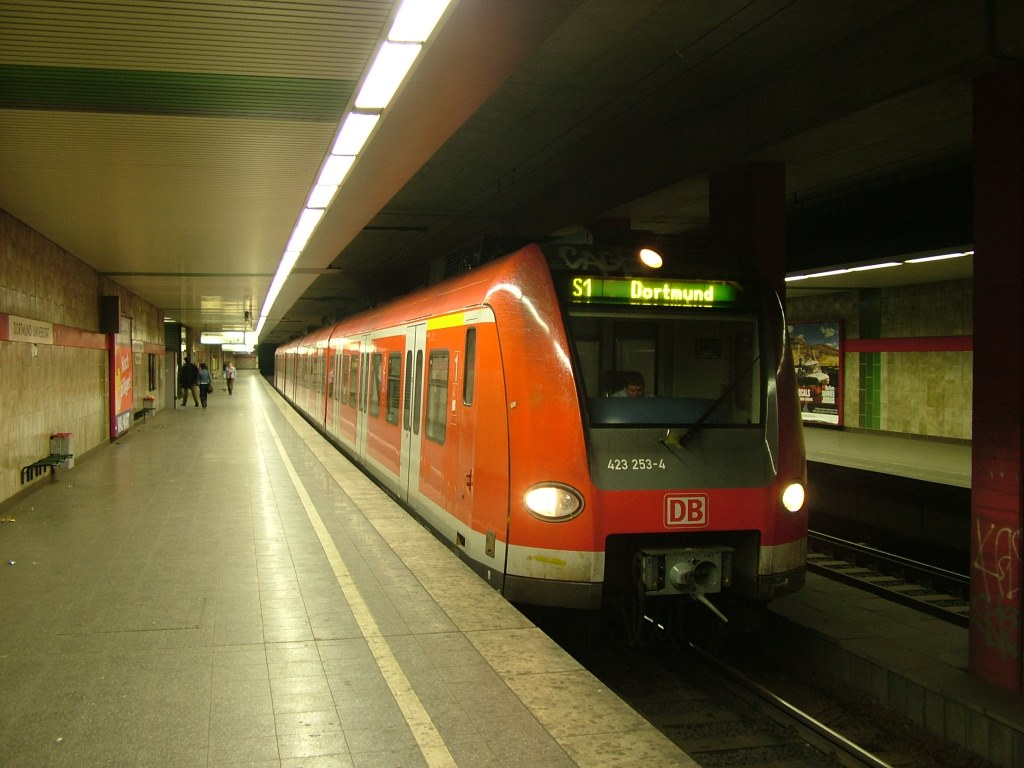
- S-Bahn train at the station

General information
- Location: Universitätsgelände, Dortmund, NRW; Germany
- Coordinates: 51°29′32″N 7°25′03″E
- Lines: Dortmund–Oberhausen/Duisburg (KBS 450.1)
- Platforms: 2

Construction
- Accessible: Yes

Other information
- Station code: 1295
- DS100 code: EDUV
- IBNR: 8004419
- Category: 4
- Fare zone: VRR: 372
- Website: www.bahnhof.de

History
- Opened: 24 September 1983

Services
Preceding station	Rhine-Ruhr S-Bahn	Following station
DO-Oespel towards Solingen Hbf	S1	DO-Dorstfeld Süd towards Dortmund Hbf
Location

Dortmund University station (German: Haltepunkt Dortmund Universität) is an underground S-Bahn station on the line between Dortmund and Bochum in the German state of North Rhine-Westphalia. The station was opened on 24 September 1983 by Deutsche Bundesbahn on a new line (line 2190) built between Bochum-Langendreer and Dortmund-Dorstfeld. Like other stations on this line, it is served only by passenger trains. It is classified by Deutsche Bahn as a category 4 station.

The station has side platforms on the two track, which are both 218 m long and 96 cm high and therefore allow a level access to the trains running there. There are no other rail facilities. The station is located directly beneath the campus of the University of Dortmund. The code for the operating point is EDUV (E = former railway division of Essen, D = Dortmund, UV = University).

== Services ==
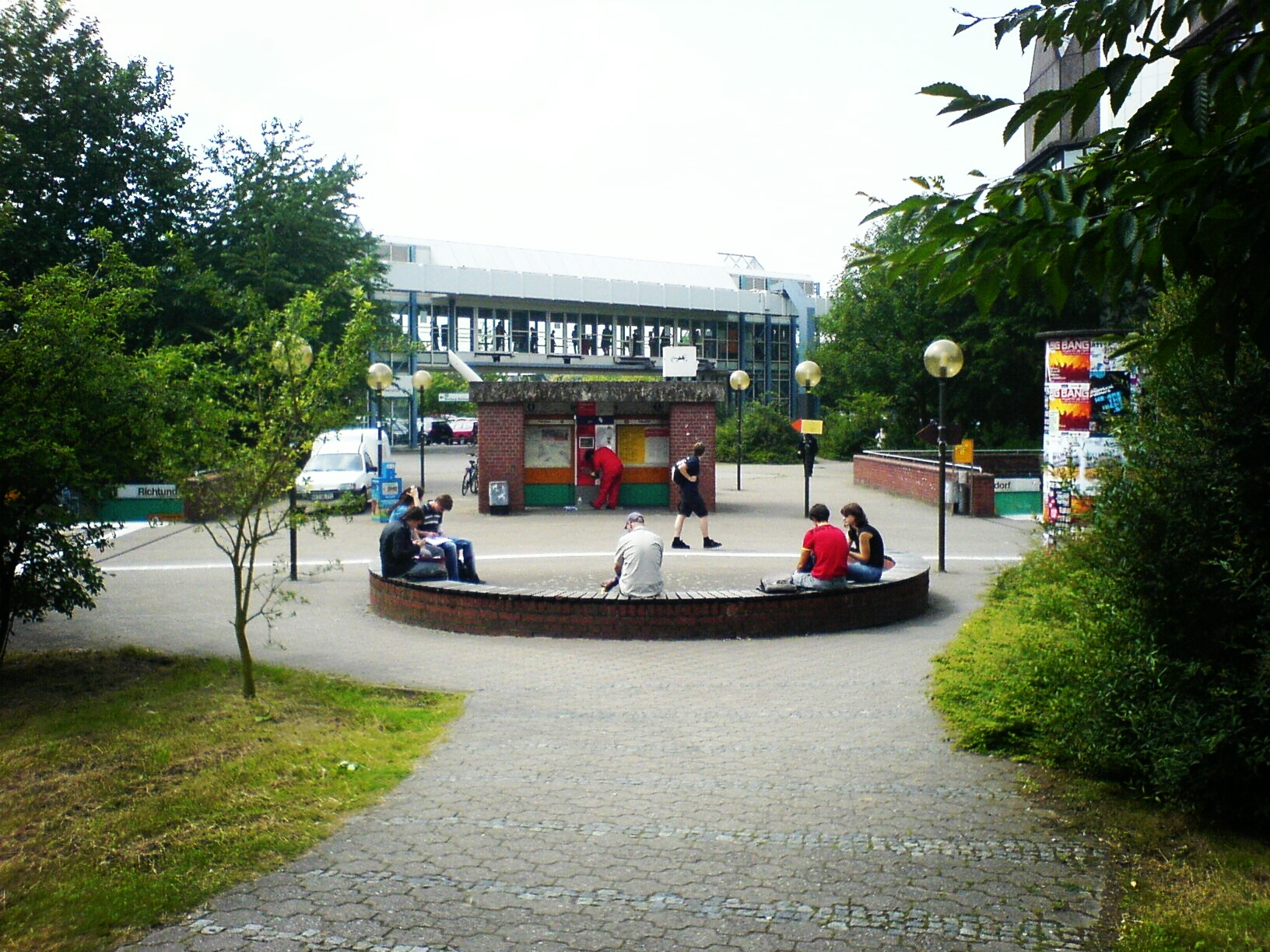
H-Bahn station, which is directly connected to the S-Bahn station by lift

The station is served by line S1 of the Rhine-Ruhr S-Bahn (Dortmund–Solingen) on weekdays every 15 minutes during the day between Dortmund and Essen. The S1 service also provides a connection towards the Ruhr University Bochum, the University of Duisburg-Essen and the Heinrich Heine University of Düsseldorf. On Saturdays, Sundays and public holidays, trains run every half-hour, and hourly at night. Services are operated by DB Regio NRW GmbH.

Directly above the station is a stop on the Dortmund H-Bahn. Both stations are connected by a common lift, providing barrier-free access for disabled passengers. In addition, the station is served day each at twenty-minute intervals by buses operated by DSW21 on lines 445, 447 and 462.
