= Dortmund-Dorstfeld Süd station =

Railway station in Dortmund, Germany

Dortmund Dorstfeld Süd
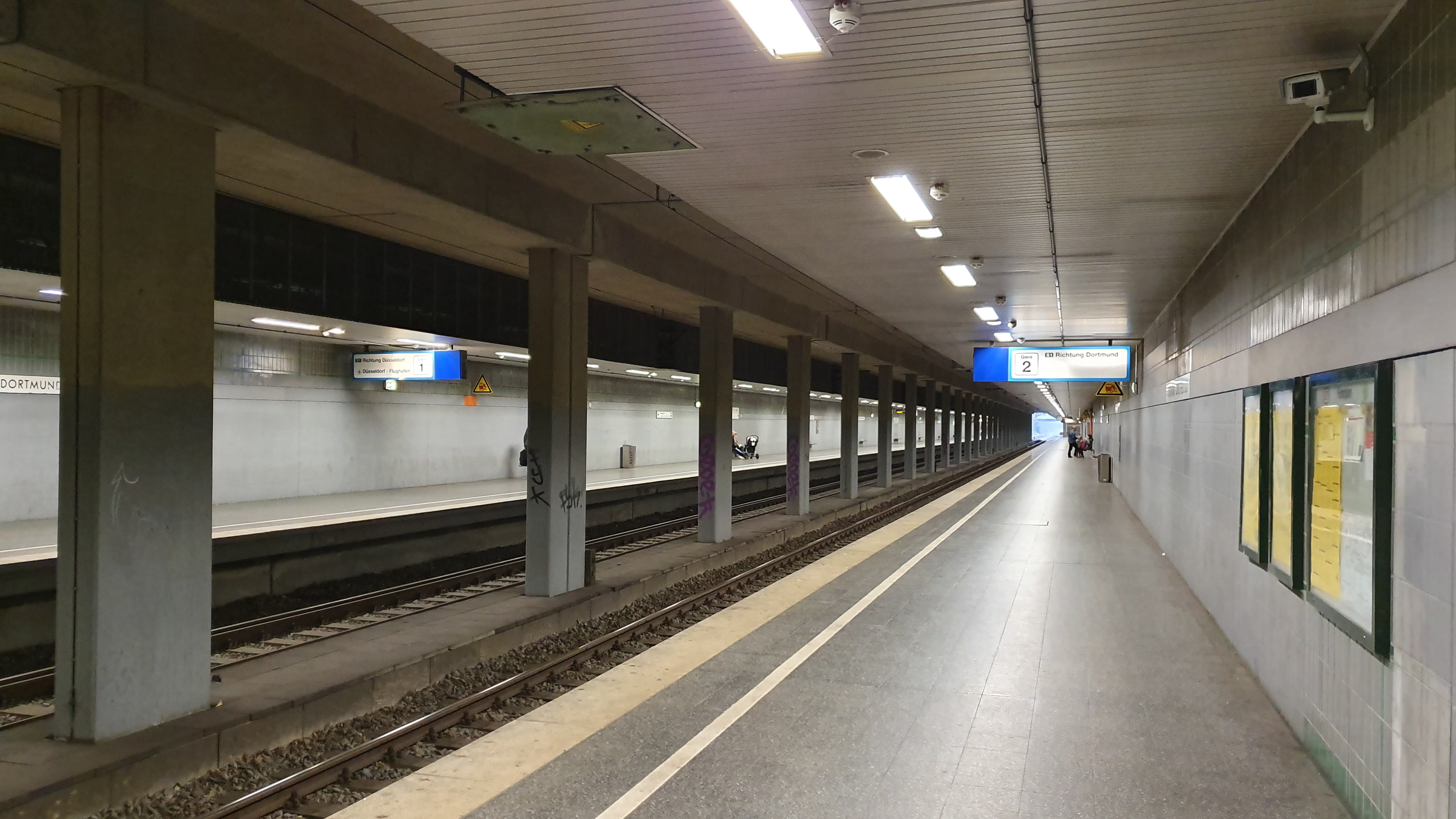

General information
- Location: Friederich Henkel Weg, Dortmund, NRW; Germany
- Coordinates: 51°30′00″N 7°25′12″E
- Lines: Dortmund–Duisburg (line 2190, KBS 450.1)
- Platforms: 2

Construction
- Accessible: Platform 1: no Platform 2: yes

Other information
- Station code: 1305
- DS100 code: EDDS
- IBNR: 8004230
- Category: 4
- Fare zone: VRR: 376
- Website: www.bahnhof.de

History
- Opened: 24 September 1983

Services
Preceding station	Rhine-Ruhr S-Bahn	Following station
Dortmund Universität towards Solingen Hbf	S1	Dortmund-Dorstfeld towards Dortmund Hbf
Location

Dortmund-Dorstfeld Süd station is an underground station in the district of Dorstfeld of the city of Dortmund in the German state of North Rhine-Westphalia. It was built on a loop line (line 2190) off the Witten/Dortmund–Oberhausen/Duisburg railway, which was opened on 24 September 1983 from Bochum-Langendreer to Dortmund-Dorstfeld. The station was also opened on 24 September 1983 and it is classified by Deutsche Bahn as a category 4 station.

The station is served by line S 1 of the Rhine-Ruhr S-Bahn (Dortmund–Solingen) every 15 minutes during the day between Dortmund and Essen.
