= Dortmund-Kley station =

Railway station in Dortmund, Germany

Dortmund Kley
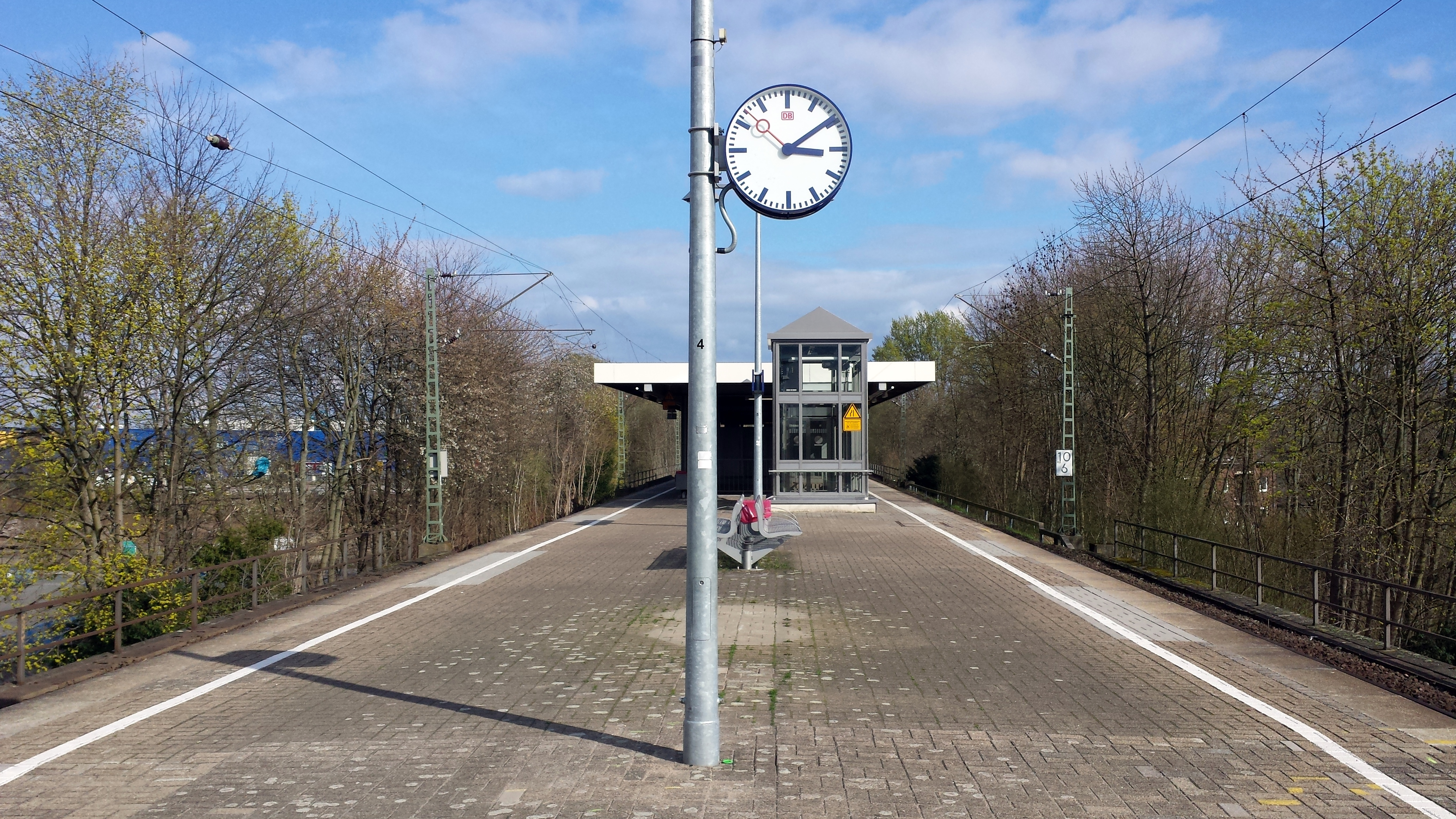

General information
- Location: Kleyer-Weg, Dortmund, NRW; Germany
- Coordinates: 51°29′22″N 7°21′56″E
- Lines: Dortmund–Oberhausen/Duisburg (KBS 450.1)
- Platforms: 2

Construction
- Accessible: Yes

Other information
- Station code: 1311
- DS100 code: EDK
- IBNR: 8004269
- Category: 5
- Fare zone: VRR: 374
- Website: www.bahnhof.de

History
- Opened: 24 September 1983

Services
| Preceding station | Rhine-Ruhr S-Bahn | Following station |
|---|---|---|
| B-Langendreer towards Solingen Hbf | S1 | DO-Oespel towards Dortmund Hbf |
Location

Dortmund-Kley station is in the district of Kley of the city of Dortmund in the German state of North Rhine-Westphalia. It was built on a loop line (line 2190) off the Witten/Dortmund–Oberhausen/Duisburg railway, which was opened on 24 September 1983 from Bochum-Langendreer to Dortmund-Dorstfeld. The station was opened on 24 September 1983 and it is classified by Deutsche Bahn as a category 5 station.

The station is served by line S 1 of the Rhine-Ruhr S-Bahn (Dortmund–Solingen), running betsween between Dortmund and Essen, every 15 minutes during the day on weekdays.

In addition, the station is served by buses on line 470, operated by DSW21 at twenty-minute intervals.
