= Dortmund-Oespel station =

Railway station in Dortmund, Germany

Dortmund Oespel
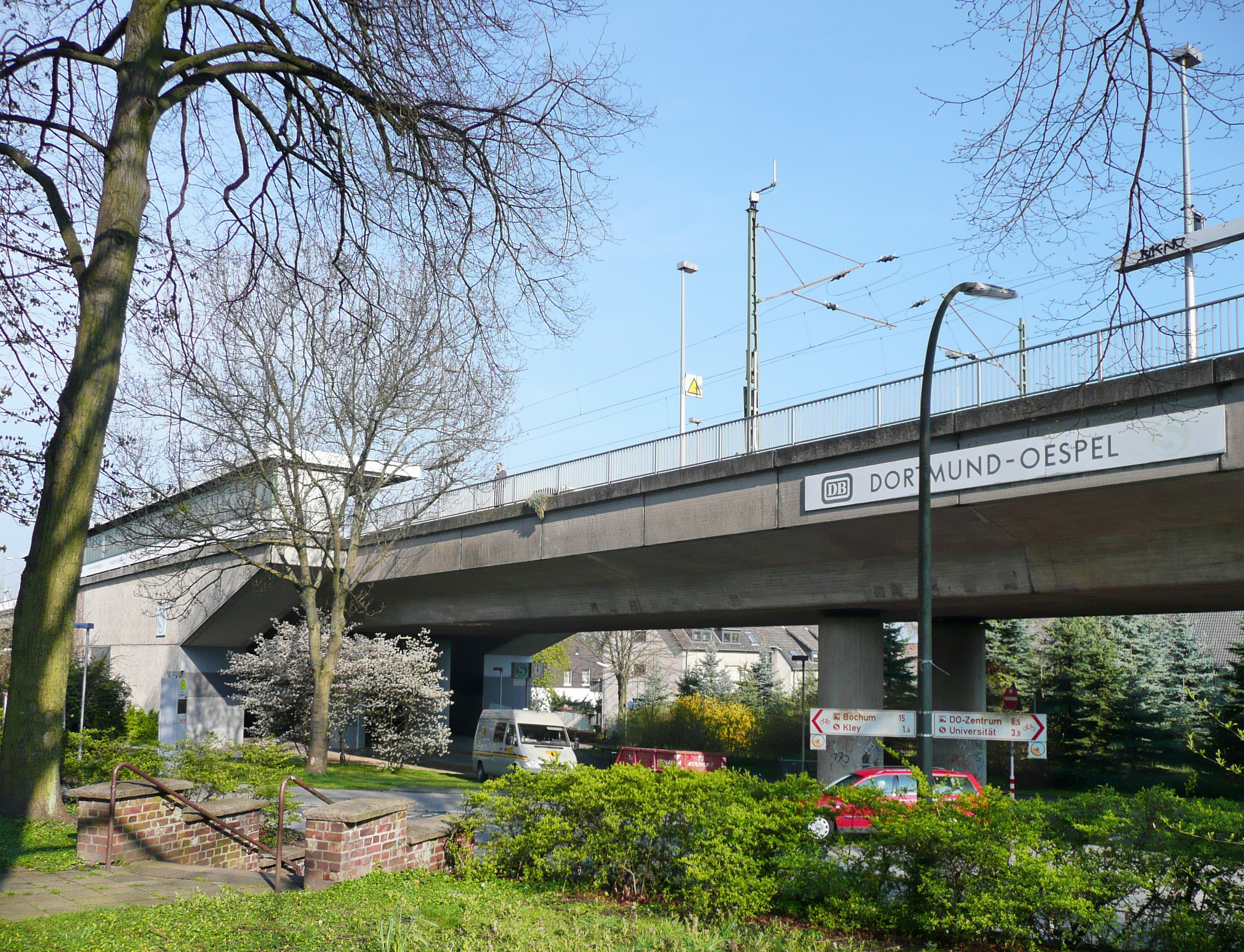

General information
- Location: Auf der Linnert, Dortmund, NRW; Germany
- Coordinates: 51°29′17″N 7°23′11″E
- Lines: Dortmund–Oberhausen/Duisburg (KBS 450.1)
- Platforms: 2

Construction
- Accessible: Yes

Other information
- Station code: 1322
- DS100 code: EDOP
- IBNR: 8004288
- Category: 5
- Fare zone: VRR: 372
- Website: www.bahnhof.de

History
- Opened: 24 September 1983

Services
Preceding station	Rhine-Ruhr S-Bahn	Following station
Dortmund-Kley towards Solingen Hbf	S1	Dortmund Universität towards Dortmund Hbf
Location

Dortmund-Oespel station is in the district of Oespel of the city of Dortmund in the German state of North Rhine-Westphalia. It was built on a loop line (line 2190) off the Witten/Dortmund–Oberhausen/Duisburg railway, which was opened on 24 September 1983 from Bochum-Langendreer to Dortmund-Dorstfeld. The station was opened on 24 September 1983 and it is classified by Deutsche Bahn as a category 5 station.

The station is served by line S 1 of the Rhine-Ruhr S-Bahn (Dortmund–Solingen), running between Dortmund and Essen, every 15 minutes during the day on weekdays.

In addition, the station is served by buses on three routes operated by DSW21, generally at twenty-minute intervals: 440, 465 and 470. It is also served by bus route 371 to Witten Hbf, operated by Verkehrsgesellschaft Ennepe-Ruhr at thirty-minute intervals.
