= Bochum-Langendreer West station =

Railway station in Germany

Bochum Langendreer West
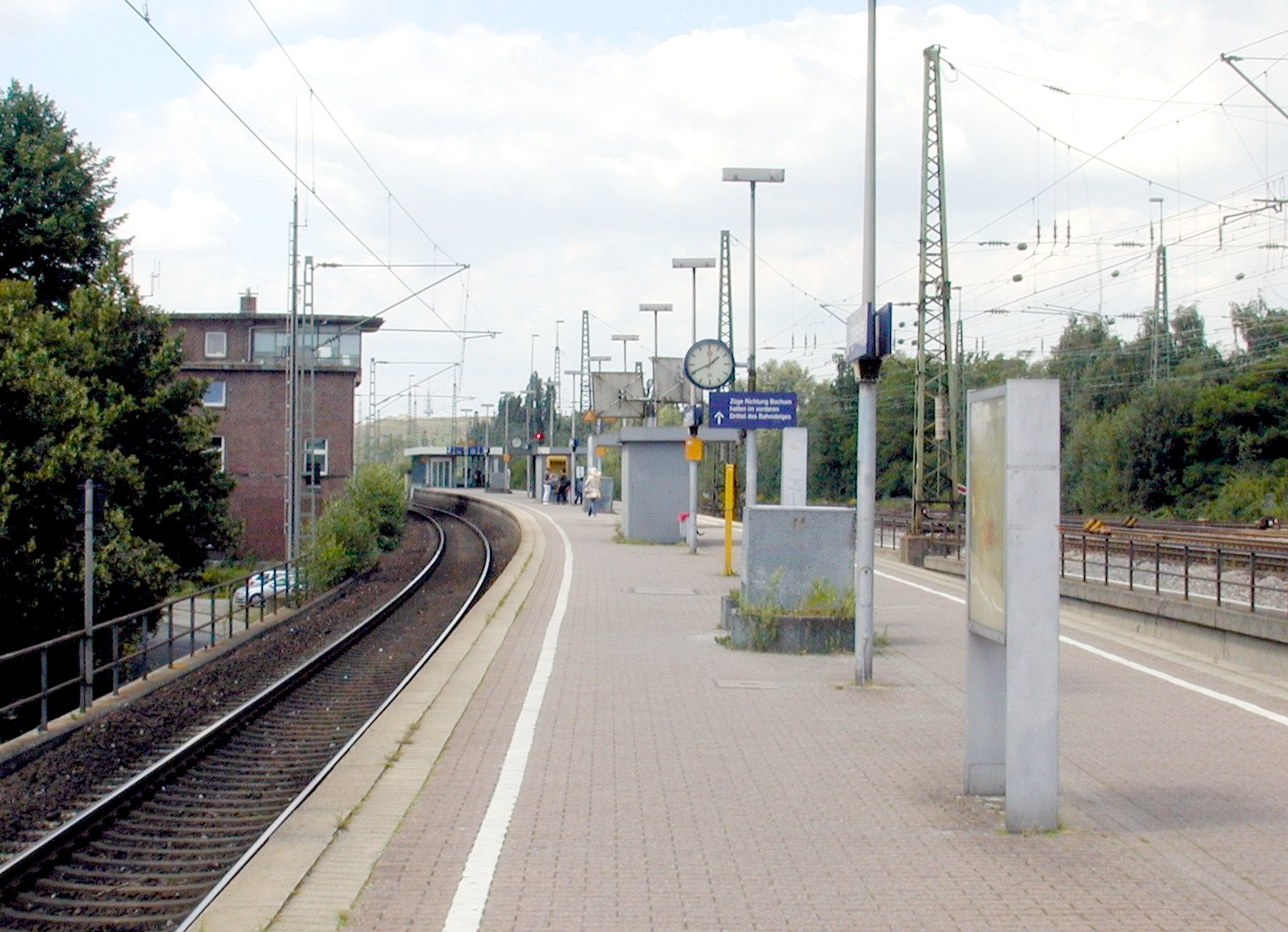

General information
- Location: Hauptstr.144, Langendreer, NRW; Germany
- Coordinates: 51°28′41″N 7°18′12″E
- Lines: Dortmund–Duisburg (KBS 450.3)
- Platforms: 2

Construction
- Accessible: Yes

Other information
- Station code: 731
- DS100 code: EBW
- IBNR: 8004474
- Category: 4
- Fare zone: VRR: 362
- Website: www.bahnhof.de

History
- Opened: BME station:1860 (closed 1908); S-Bahn station: 24 September 1983

Services
Preceding station	Rhine-Ruhr S-Bahn	Following station
Bochum Hbf towards Solingen Hbf	S1	B-Langendreer towards Dortmund Hbf
Location

Bochum-Langendreer West station is a stop on the Rhine-Ruhr S-Bahn in the district of Langendreer in eastern Bochum in the German state of North Rhine-Westphalia.

== History ==
The first station in Langendreer was opened on 26 October 1860 by the Bergisch-Märkische Railway Company (Bergisch-Märkische Eisenbahn-Gesellschaft, BME) on its line from Witten Hauptbahnhof as Langendreer station. In 1862, this line was completed to Dortmund and Duisburg and now forms the Witten/Dortmund–Oberhausen/Duisburg railway, one of the most important lines in Germany. The BME station was quite far from the former village of Langendreer, approximately at the location of the current Bochum-Langendreer West station. The station primarily served freight transport, connecting in particular to the nearby Mansfeld, Vollmond and Neu-Iserlohn mines, while passenger traffic was only of secondary importance. Between 1897 and 1905, the station was renamed Langendreer-Süd (south), but in 1908 it was closed when Langendreer station was consolidated on the site of the Rhenish Railway Company's station, which had opened in 1874. On 24 September 1983, Bochum-Langendreer West station, was opened as part of the extension of Rhine-Ruhr S-Bahn line S 1 from Bochum Hauptbahnhof to Dortmund Hauptbahnhof.

== Services ==
Bochum-Langendreer S-Bahn station is on the Witten/Dortmund–Oberhausen/Duisburg line and is classified by Deutsche Bahn as a category 4 station. It consists of two tracks on either side of a central platform. Both tracks are used for regular Rhine-Ruhr S-Bahn services. It is served by Rhine-Ruhr S-Bahn line S 1 (Dortmund–Solingen) on week days every 15 minutes during the day between Dortmund and Essen.

The station is served by bus lines 355 (every 20 minutes), 364 (20/40), 366 (60), 370 (60) and 372 (60), operated by BOGESTRA. Within walking distance there is also a connection to the tram lines 302, 305 and 310 (stop Lessingschule).
