= Paul Nieder-Westermann =

German Nazi politician

Reichstag Deputy Westphalia South
- In office 1936–1945

Personal details
- Born: 3 October 1892; Langendreer, Province of Westphalia, Kingdom of Prussia, German Empire
- Died: 10 October 1957; Bochum, Westphalia, West Germany
- Political party: Nazi Party

Military service
- Branch/service: National Socialist Motor Corps
- Rank: NSKK-Obergruppenführer

Paul Nieder-Westermann (3 October 1892, Langendreer – 10 October 1957, Bochum) was a German politician of the Nazi Party and an Obergruppenführer in the National Socialist Motor Corps.

== Early years ==
Nieder-Westermann attended elementary and secondary schools in Langendreer and Bad Pyrmont and went on to study at the agricultural colleges of Hohenheim and Stuttgart. From 1916 to 1918, he took part in the First World War on the western front.

== Career in Nazi Germany ==
On 1 April 1933, Nieder-Westermann was appointed leader of the Westphalia-South Squadron of the NSKK. He later became leader of the 70th Standarte and reached the rank of NSKK-Obergruppenführer in 1943. Nieder-Westermann was elected as a deputy to the Reichstag for electoral constituency 18 (Westphalia South) in 1936 and 1938. He also served as a judge in the People's Court.
