= Bochum-Werne =

Coordinates: 51°29′11″N 7°18′24″E

Bochum-Werne is a district of the city of Bochum in the Ruhr area in North Rhine-Westphalia in Germany. Werne is in the East of Bochum, North of Langendreer.

Werne borders the city of Dortmund.
