= Langendreer =

District of Bochum, Germany

Coordinates: 51°28′25″N 7°19′27″E

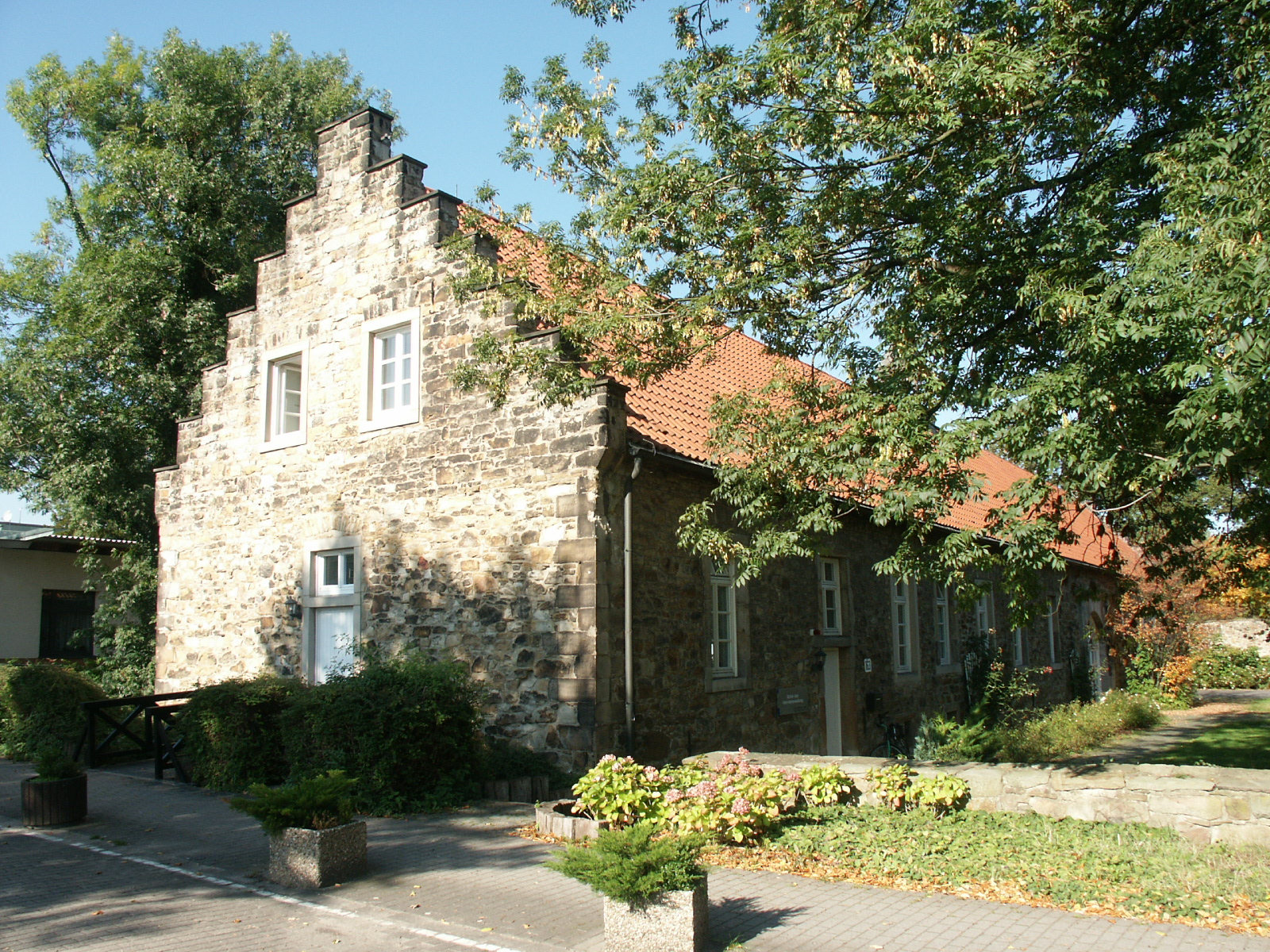
Haus Langendreer

Langendreer is the largest and most populous district of the city of Bochum in the Ruhr area in Germany, with a population of 25,438 as of 31 December 2023. The district is located between the cities Dortmund, the largest city of Westphalia, to the east and Witten to the south, and four other districts of Bochum to the north and west — Langendreer-Alter Bahnhof, Bochum-Laer, Bochum-Querenburg, and Bochum-Werne. Langendreer is the easternmost district of Bochum. The district includes, among others, Kaltehardt, a mainly residential area, Langendreerholz, and Ümmingen. Bochum-Langendreer station is one of the largest railway stations in Bochum and the district is also served by Bochum-Langendreer West station. The freight station in Langendreer was one of the reasons why the village and administrative district of Langendreer was incorporated into the city of Bochum on 1 August 1929, as Bochum did not have comparable capacities. Langendreer used to be one of the main centers of the East Prussian minority in Western Germany.

In the early 20th century coal mining and steel manufacturing were the primary employers in Langendreer.

Langendreer-Alter Bahnhof is a statistical district and monument area of the city of Bochum. Langendreer-Alter Bahnhof is in the east side of the city, between Bochum-Querenburg and Bochum-Werne. It used to be, and to some extent, still is a business district that accommodated the needs of the mines and railway, while the rest of Langendreer is more of a "village" with residential areas.

Langendreer-Alter Bahnhof is south of the main Autobahn of the Ruhr, A 40.

== Notable people ==
- Bastian Pastewka (born 1972), German actor and comedian known for his television series Pastewka
- Paul Nieder-Westermann (1892–1954), German Nazi Party official and SA leader
- Fritz Katzmann (1906–1957), German SS-Gruppenführer and war criminal responsible for the Katzmann Report on the Holocaust in Galicia
