= Dortmund-Lütgendortmund station =

Railway station in Dortmund, Germany

Dortmund Lütgendortmund
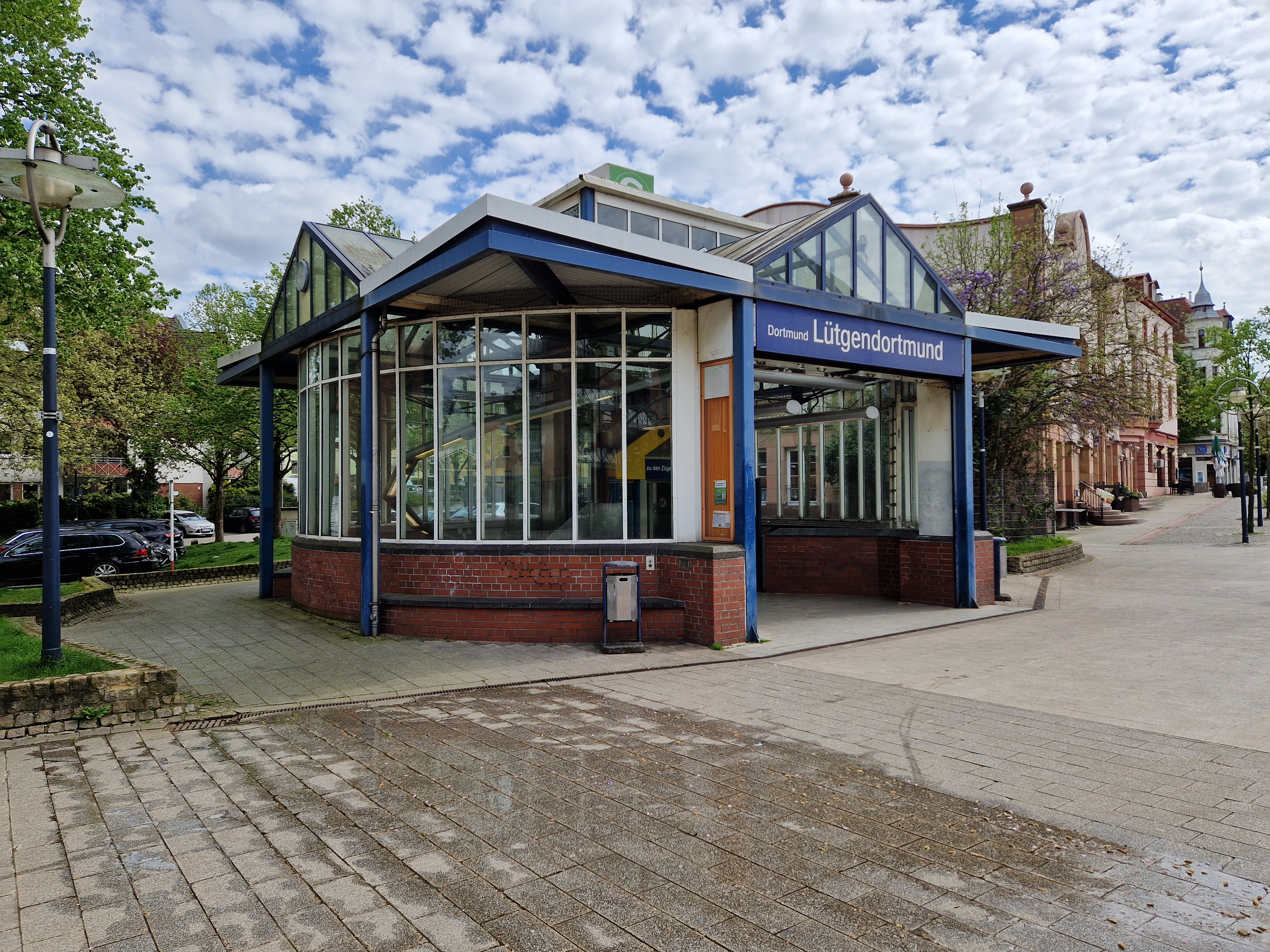
- Entrance to the underground station

General information
- Location: Dortmund, NRW; Germany
- Coordinates: 51°30′3″N 7°20′3″E
- Owner: DB Netz
- Operator: DB Station&Service
- Lines: Lütgendortmund–Dortmund (KBS 450.4)
- Platforms: 1
- Train operators: DB Regio NRW

Construction
- Accessible: Yes

Other information
- Station code: 1235
- DS100 code: EDLS
- IBNR: 8001516
- Category: 5
- Fare zone: VRR: 374
- Website: www.bahnhof.de

History
- Opened: 23 May 1993

Services
Preceding station	Rhine-Ruhr S-Bahn	Following station
Terminus	S4	DO-Somborn towards Unna
Location
- Location within North Rhine-Westphalia

Dortmund-Lütgendortmund station is a single-track, underground terminal station in the city of Dortmund in the German state of North Rhine-Westphalia. The platform is accessible by stairs, escalator or lift. It was opened in 1993 at the end of an extension of Line S 4 trains of the Rhine-Ruhr S-Bahn. Trains reverse here in order to return to Unna station. It is classified by Deutsche Bahn as a category 5 station.

== History ==
The station was built as part of the extension of a fragment of the Rhenish Railway Company's Ruhr line, which opened in 1874. Line S 4 services commenced operation to the station on 23 May 1993. The nearest bus stop had been called Lütgendortmunder Markt, but it was renamed Dortmund Lütgendortmund S-Bahn station.

Extension of the S 4 line from its current western end in the tunnel at Dortmund-Lütgendortmund was formerly planned to be implemented with a target of opening it in 2015. This would have included an extension of the single-track tunnel to the immediate south of Dortmund-Bövinghausen station. The S 4 would run from there to Herne on the Duisburg-Ruhrort–Dortmund railway (the Emscher Valley Railway of the Cologne-Minden Railway Company) and there take over the Herne–Essen branch of the current S 2 line. The Emschertal-Bahn (RB 43) Regionalbahn service would only operate between Herne and Dorsten. The eastern section of the Emscher Valley Railway between Dortmund-Bövinghausen and Dortmund Hauptbahnhof would be used by a new line of the Dortmund Stadtbahn. For a long time funds have been available for the construction of the line to Bövinghausen, however, the financing for the operation of the line is not guaranteed. The Emschertal-Bahn runs between Dortmund-Bövinghausen and Herne every hour, but the S4 would run between Herne and Essen every twenty minutes as an S-Bahn service, so the Verkehrsverbund Rhein-Ruhr would have to fund the increased services through savings in other areas. Upon taking office, the transport minister Oliver Wittke called for all such proposals to be re-evaluated. The line extension has been removed from the integrated transportation plan for North Rhine-Westphalia; a resubmission is possible from 2015.

Lütgendortmund has other railway stations. The former Lütgendortmund station at the district border with Marten and Kley is now called Dortmund-Germania, after the former Germania colliery. There is also Dortmund Lütgendortmund Nord station on the Duisburg-Ruhrort–Dortmund line.

== Rail services ==
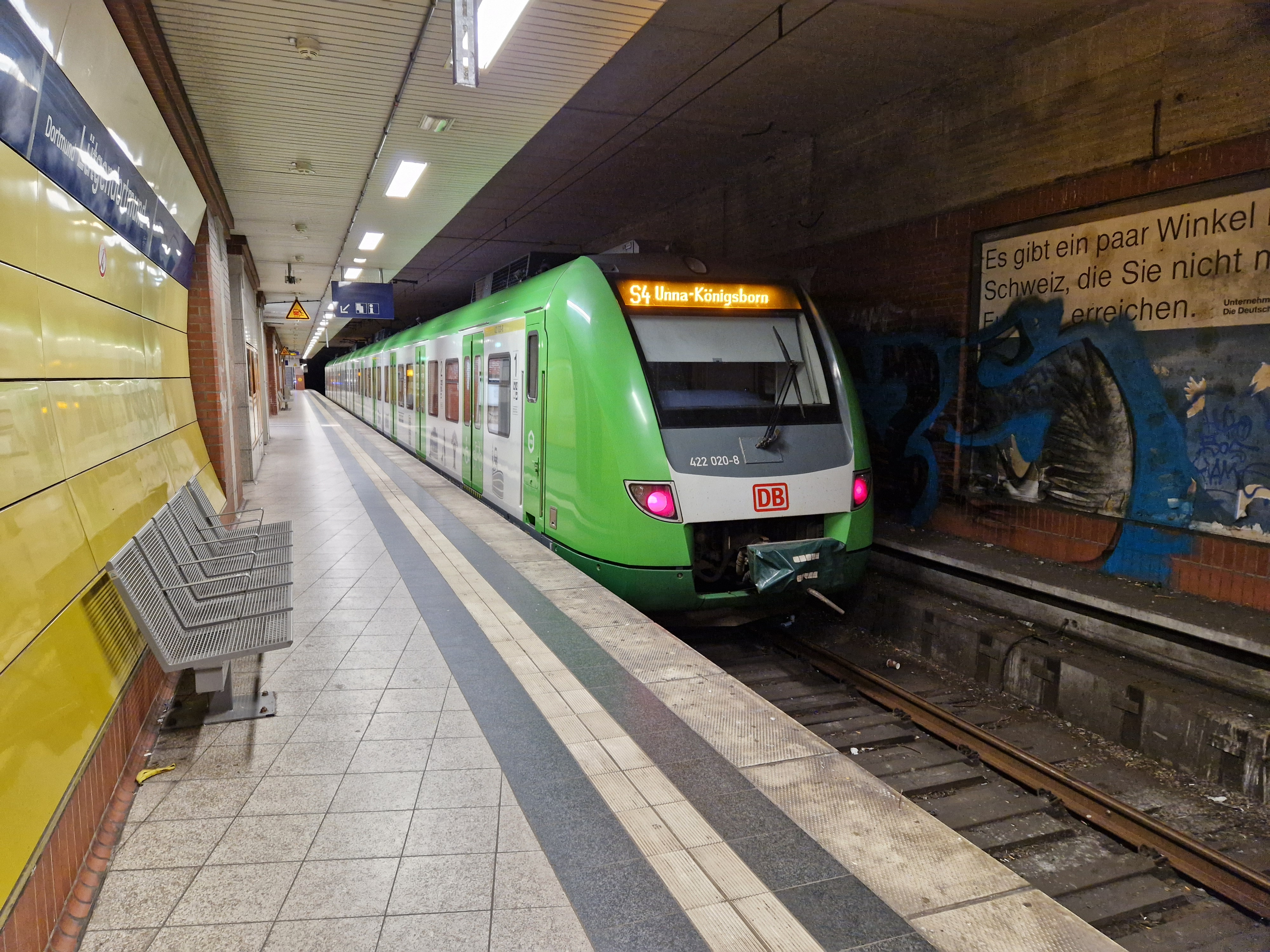
Underground platform

The station is served by S 4 services between Lütgendortmund and Unna via Dortmund Stadthaus and Dortmund-Dorstfeld at 30-minute intervals (15-minute intervals in the peak between Dortmund-Lütgendortmund and Unna-Königsborn).

It is also served by four bus routes operated by BOGESTRA: 336 (at 20-minute intervals), 369 (30), 370 (60) and 378 (20) and four operated by Dortmunder Stadtwerke: 462 (20), 463 (60), 464 (30) and 470 (20).
