= Dortmund-Huckarde station =

Railway station in Dortmund, Germany

Dortmund Huckarde
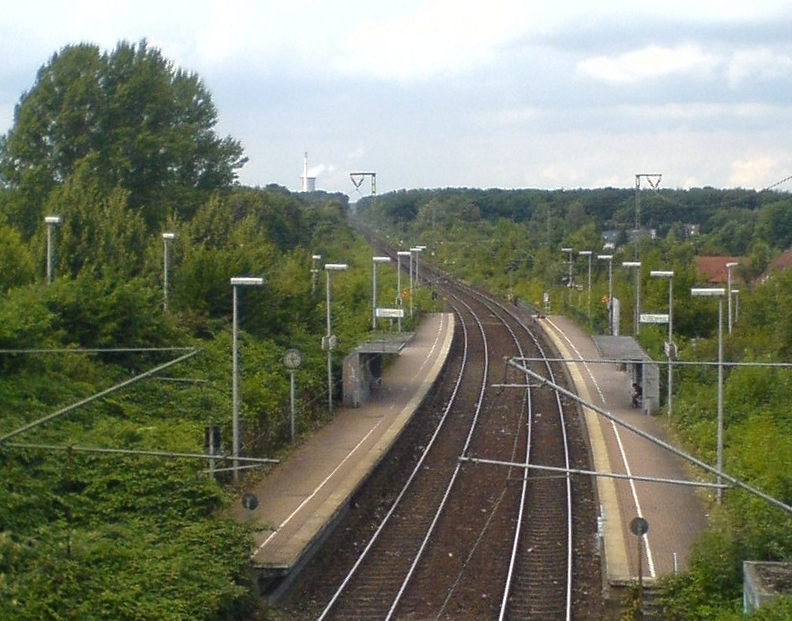
- Dortmund-Huckarde station in 2007

General information
- Location: Aspeystr., Dortmund, NRW; Germany
- Coordinates: 51°31′57″N 7°24′08″E
- Line: Welver–Sterkrade railway
- Platforms: 2

Construction
- Accessible: Yes

Other information
- Station code: 1307
- DS100 code: EDOH
- IBNR: 8001505
- Category: 6
- Fare zone: VRR: 376
- Website: www.bahnhof.de

History
- Opened: 2 June 1991

Services
Preceding station	Rhine-Ruhr S-Bahn	Following station
DO-Westerfilde towards Essen Hbf or Recklinghausen Hbf	S2	DO-Wischlingen towards Dortmund Hbf
Location

Dortmund-Huckarde is a railway station on the Welver–Sterkrade railway situated in Dortmund in western Germany. It is classified by Deutsche Bahn as a category 6 station. It is served by Rhine-Ruhr S-Bahn line S2 every 30 minutes.
