= Bochum-Langendreer station =

Railway station in Germany

Bochum Langendreer
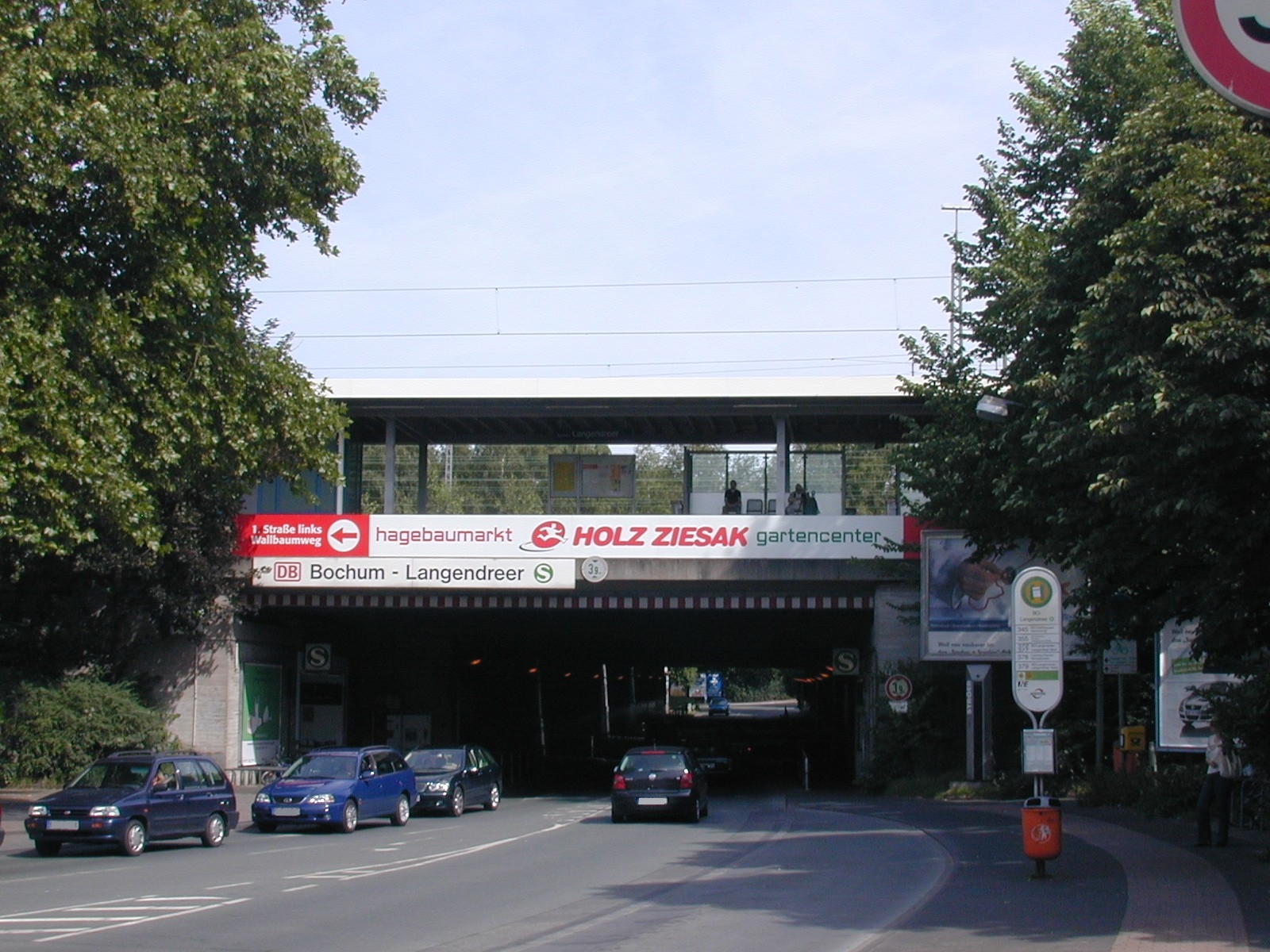

General information
- Location: Hauptstr.144, Langendreer, NRW; Germany
- Coordinates: 51°28′39″N 7°19′19″E (S-Bahn); 51°28′40″N 7°18′50″E (depot)
- Owner: Deutsche Bahn
- Operator: DB Netz; DB Station&Service
- Lines: Dortmund–Duisburg (KBS 450.3) S1; Bochum-Langendreer–Witten; Osterath–Dortmund Süd railway; DO-Löttringhausen–B-Langendreer
- Platforms: 2
- Connections: Trams in Bochum/Gelsenkirchen: 302

Construction
- Accessible: Yes

Other information
- Station code: 730
- DS100 code: EBP (S-Bahn station); EBLA (depot)
- IBNR: 8000358
- Category: 4
- Fare zone: VRR: 362
- Website: www.bahnhof.de

History
- Opened: BME station: 26 October 1862; RHE station: 19 November 1874; New Langendreer Nord station: 1907/08; S-Bahn station: 24 September 1983

Services
Preceding station	Rhine-Ruhr S-Bahn	Following station
B-Langendreer West towards Solingen Hbf	S1	DO-Kley towards Dortmund Hbf
Location

Bochum-Langendreer station is now a stop on the Rhine-Ruhr S-Bahn in the district of Langendreer in eastern Bochum in the German state of North Rhine-Westphalia. Langendreer formerly had a 40 hectare marshalling yard, which is now used as a depot, with the location code of EBLA. Until the 1980s, the yard was also the location of a passenger station, which was served by express trains.

== Services ==
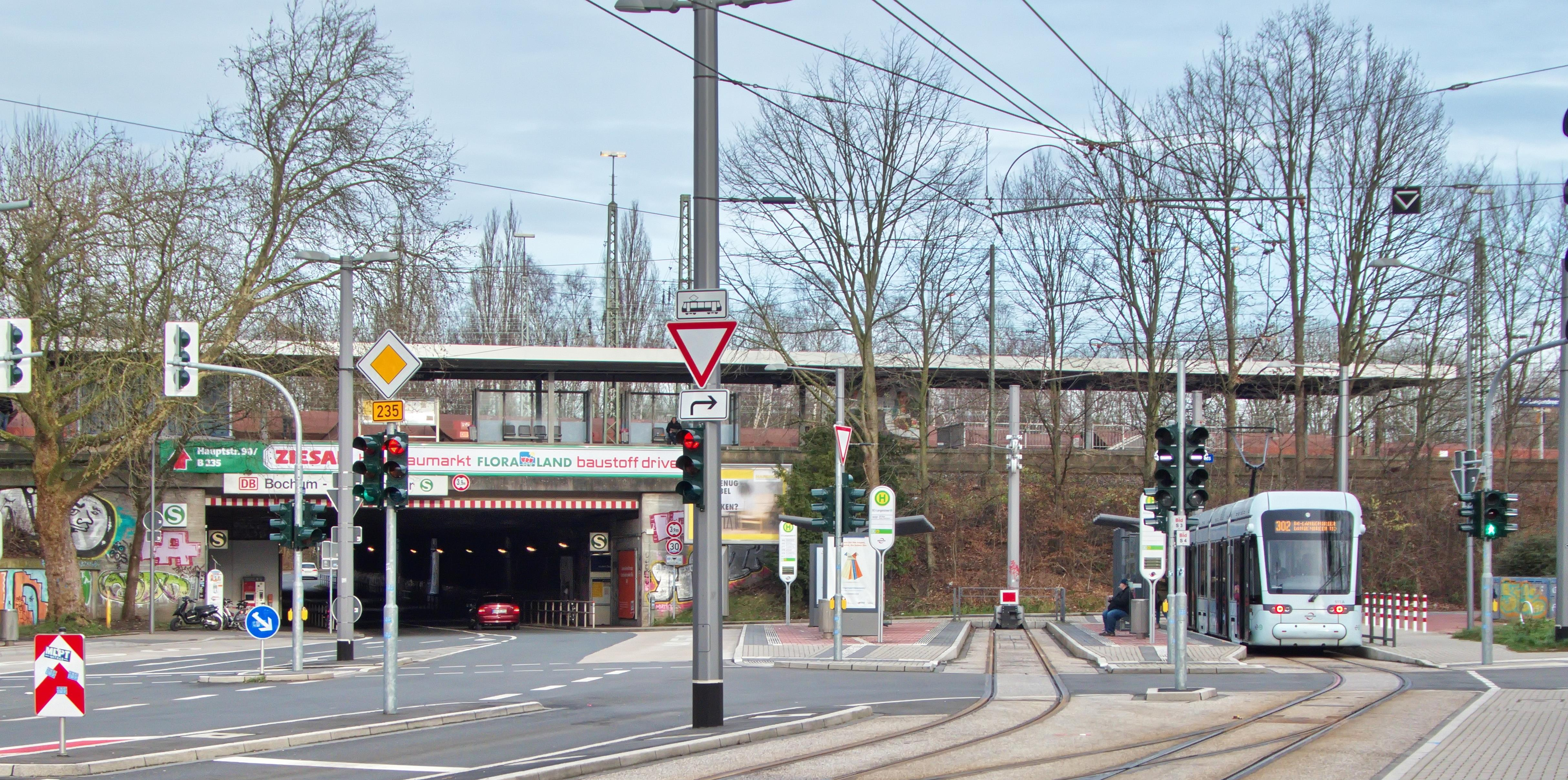
Bochum-Langendreer tram stop.

Bochum-Langendreer S-Bahn station is on the Witten/Dortmund–Oberhausen/Duisburg line and is classified by Deutsche Bahn as a category 4 station. It consists of two tracks on either side of a central platform. Both tracks are used for regular Rhine-Ruhr S-Bahn services. It is served by Rhine-Ruhr S-Bahn line S 1 (Dortmund–Solingen) on week days every 15 minutes during the day between Dortmund and Essen.

The station is served by bus lines 369, 378 and 379 operated by BOGESTRA, at least once every 20 minutes. The station can also be reached by tramline 302 (Bochum Langendreer S - Gelsenkirchen Buer Rathaus), which is continued from the old endpoint Laer Mitte, to the new endpoint Langendreer station and tramline 305 (Bochum Langendreer S - Bochum Höntrop Kirche), which is a new tramline since December 2019. At night (weekend), the night buses NE3 to Bochum Hbf and NE17 to Witten run here. Since November 2020, the tramline 309 (from Witten-Heven) has its endpoint at the station of Bochum Langendreer, too. Nearby the station the tramline 310 runs from Witten via Langendreer Markt to Bochum Höntrop Kirche. Langendreer Markt can be reached within walking distance or by tram lines 302, 305 and 309 or by bus.

== History ==
The first station in Langendreer was opened on 26 October 1860 by the Bergisch-Märkische Railway Company (Bergisch-Märkische Eisenbahn-Gesellschaft, BME) on its line from Witten Hauptbahnhof. In 1862, this line was completed to Dortmund and Duisburg and now forms the Witten/Dortmund–Oberhausen/Duisburg railway, one of the most important lines in Germany. In 1862 the line to Bochum-Laer was also opened exclusively for coal trains to the Dannenbaum colliery. In 1870, it was extended to Bochum-Dahlhausen and general freight trains began to run on it.

The BME station was quite far from the former village of Langendreer, approximately at the location of today's Bochum-Langendreer West station. The station primarily served freight transport, connecting in particular to the nearby Mansfeld, Vollmond and Neu-Iserlohn mines, while passenger traffic was only of secondary importance. As a major node in the BME network, the station was equipped with a large entrance hall, a large goods shed, built north of the railway tracks on Gasstraße, a rectangular engine shed with a turntable and a water tower. In 1874, the BME built a small marshalling yard, which was continually expanded over the years.

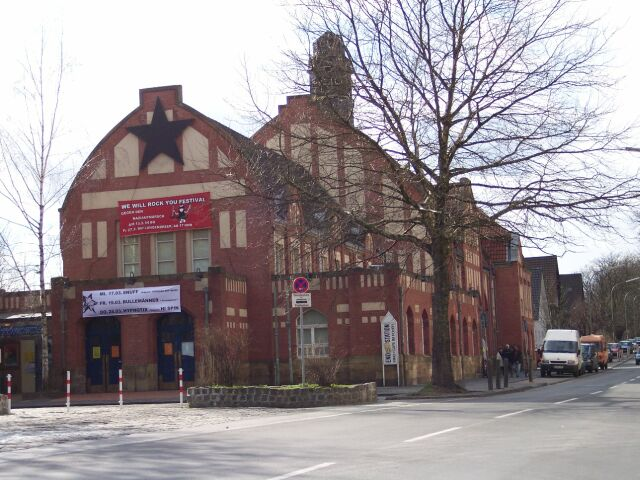
The Langendreer station building, now used as a cultural centre.

On 19 November 1874, the Rhenish Railway Company (Rheinische Eisenbahn-Gesellschaft, RhE) opened another station in Langendreer, located to the east of the BME station at today's Kulturzentrum Bahnhof-Langendreer (“Langendreer culture centre station”). This six-track through station was located to the north of the BME tracks on the line from Bochum Nord to Dortmund Sud. The relationship of the two railway companies was characterised by fierce competition, as shown by the controversy over the connection to the Siebenplaneten mine. This mine received a connection to both routes in 1877. In December 1880 the Rhenish Railway opened a branch line to Dortmund Löttringhausen.

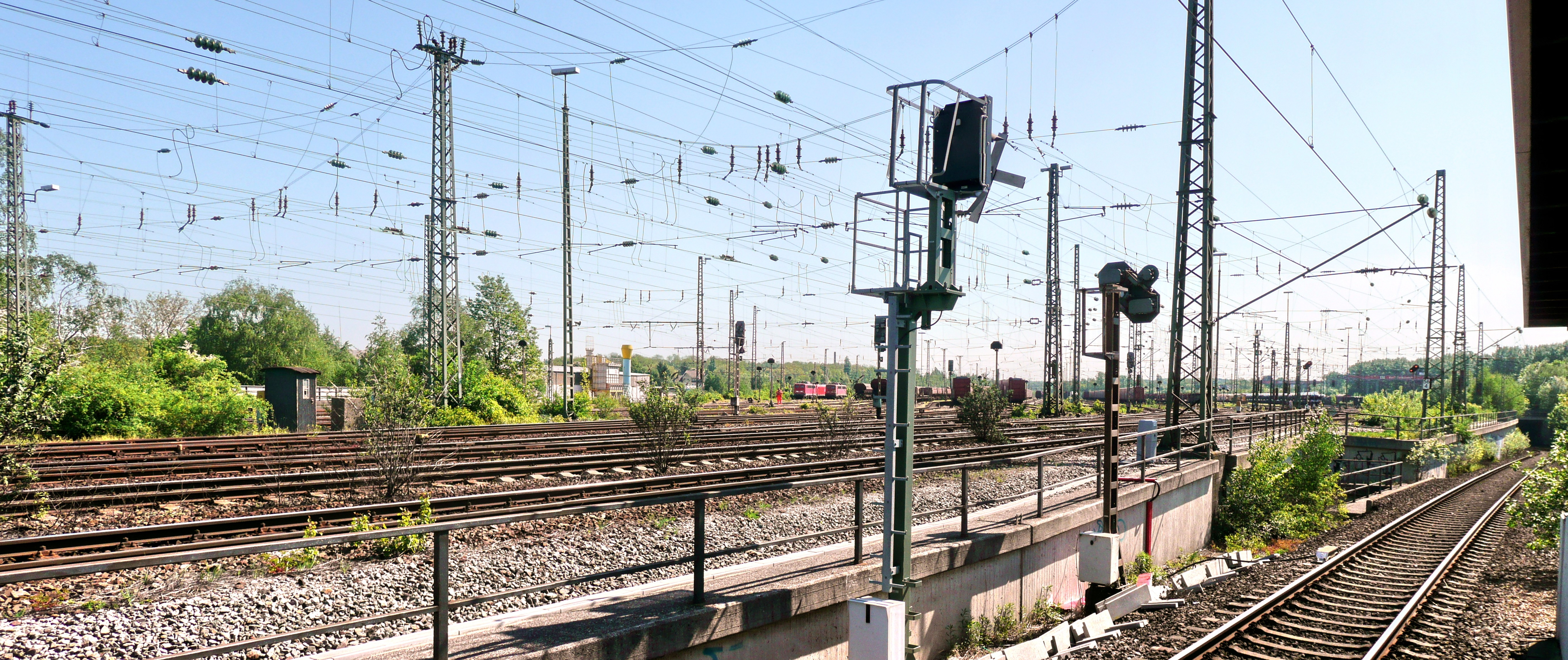
Eastern marshalling yard

Both the Bergisch-Märkische Railway Company and the Rhenish Railway Company were nationalised between 1880 and 1882 and absorbed by the Prussian state railways. The former BME station was subsequently renamed Langendreer-Süd (south) and the former RhE station was renamed Langendreer-Nord (north). Further increases in traffic in the early 20th century resulted in a fundamental transformation of the railways in Langendreer, leading to the creation of separate passenger and freight rail networks. A new, two-sided marshalling yard (with separate yards for traffic in each direction) was built for freight in 1906, a six-track passenger station was built at Langendreer Nord. In 1907 and 1908 station building was built to a design by the architect Schlomeyer, which consisted of three buildings in the Art Nouveau style with a pitched roof. The Langendreer-Süd was closed and was redeveloped for residential building.

With the incorporation of Langendreer in Bochum, the station was renamed on 1 August 1929 as Bochum-Langendreer. At the time of the Weimar Republic, the line was quadruplicated to Bochum, and Langendreer station was also served by the Ruhr rapid-transit network (Ruhrschnellverkehr), the predecessor of the Rhine-Ruhr S-Bahn network. During the Second World War, the station was damaged, but only slightly compared to other similar stations.

Due to the closure of coal mining in the Ruhr, freight traffic dropped drastically in the 1950s. The western hump-yard was shut down in 1962, its marshalling operations were transferred to Bochum-Dahlhausen and Wanne-Eickel. The establishment of two Opel car factories in Bochum in 1962, changed the nature of freight traffic in Langendreer: in addition to new cars, car components from within General Motors Corporation were transported by rail. In 1967 a container terminal was opened; it was closed in 2000.

In the 1970s, there were limited regional passenger services serving Langendreer, on the line to Dortmund-Löttringhausen for example, there were two pairs of trains in the 1976 summer timetable. In 1982, Langendreer was abandoned as a stop for express trains. Since September 1983, the station has been served by Rhine-Ruhr S-Bahn line S 1 S-from Bochum Hauptbahnhof via Langendreer to Dortmund. The newly built S-Bahn line runs south of the freight tracks, while the old lines ran to the station to the north of the freight tracks. With the opening of the S-Bahn line with two new stations of Langendreer West and Langendreer, the old passenger station was closed. Consequently, the direct passenger service towards Witten was abandoned. In 1985 the reception building was saved from demolition. The building was heritage-listed and extensively renovated in 1986 and re-opened as the Langendreer station culture centre (Kulturbahnhof).

In the summer of 1998, the operations of the eastern marshalling yard was closed. Parts of these yard are now used as a train depot.
