= Dortmund-Dorstfeld station =

Railway station in Dortmund, Germany

Dortmund Dorstfeld
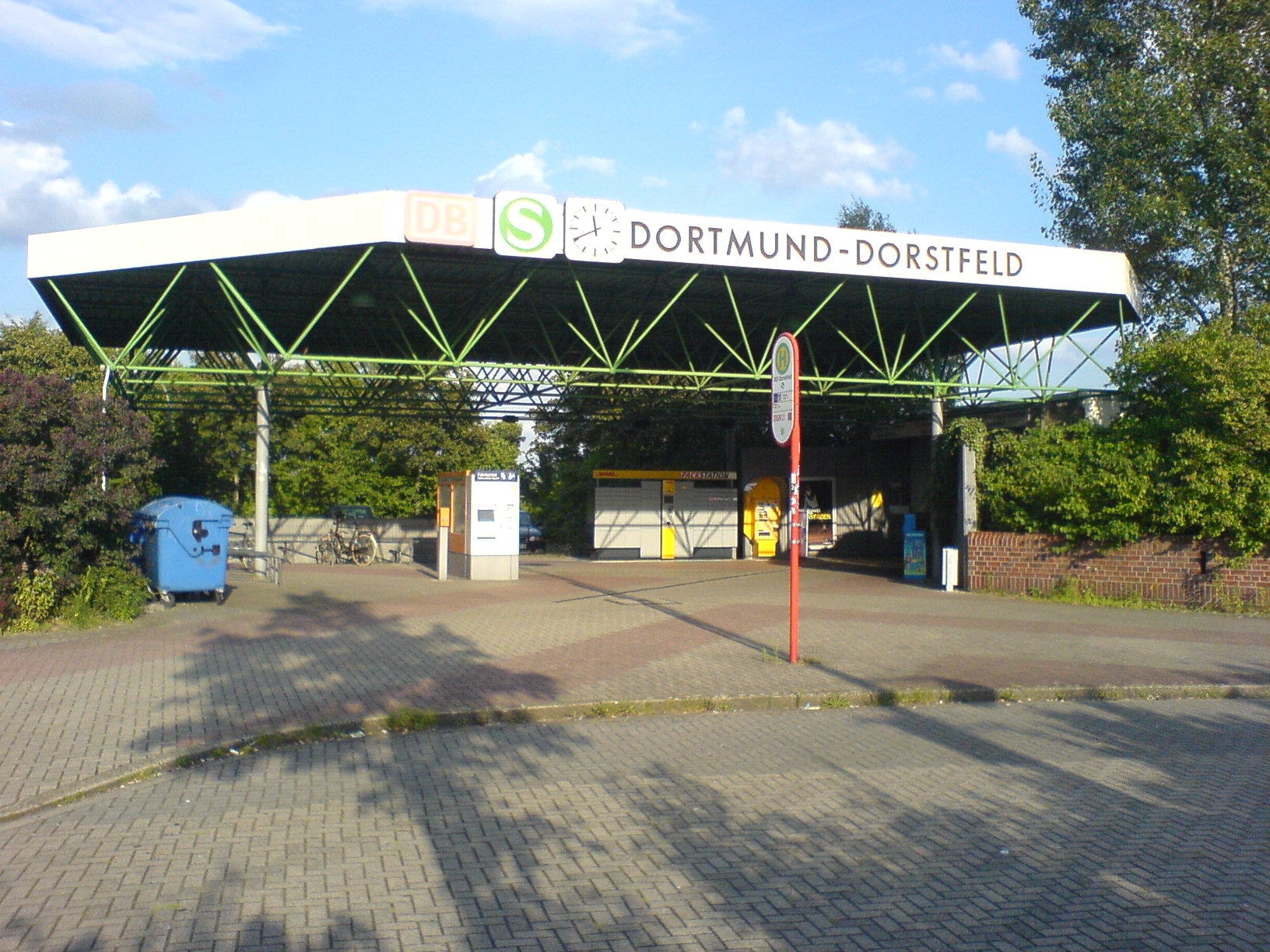

General information
- Location: Dortmund, NRW; Germany
- Coordinates: 51°30′34″N 7°25′31″E
- Owner: Deutsche Bahn
- Operator: DB Station&Service
- Lines: Dortmund–Duisburg (KBS 450.1) S1; Dortmund–Herne S2S4; Dortmund–Lütgendortmund S4
- Platforms: 6
- Train operators: DB Regio NRW

Construction
- Accessible: Yes

Other information
- Station code: 1304
- DS100 code: EDDP
- Category: 3
- Fare zone: VRR: 376
- Website: www.bahnhof.de

History
- Opened: 24 September 1983

Services
Preceding station	Rhine-Ruhr S-Bahn	Following station
DO-Dorstfeld Süd towards Solingen Hbf	S1	Dortmund Hbf Terminus
DO-Wischlingen towards Essen Hbf or Recklinghausen Hbf	S2	Dortmund Hbf Terminus
DO-Marten Süd towards DO-Lütgendortmund	S4	Dortmund West towards Unna
Location

Dortmund-Dorstfeld is an S-Bahn station in Dortmund in the German state of North Rhine-Westphalia. It the second most important S-Bahn node in the city after Dortmund Hauptbahnhof. It has four above-ground tracks, which are accessible via two island platforms and two underground tracks that are accessible via side platforms. The station is classified as a category 3 station. It is served by Rhine-Ruhr S-Bahn lines S1, S2 and S4.

== Significance ==
The station is served by three lines of the Rhine-Ruhr S-Bahn, the S1 from Dortmund to Solingen, the S2 from Dortmund to Herne (and continuing to Recklinghausen or Essen) and the S4 from Dortmund-Lütgendortmund to Unna. All three lines are operated by DB Regio NRW and run at 30-minute intervals (15-minute intervals in the peak on the section through Dortmund-Dorstfeld). The station is a railway junction and is particularly important because line S4 uses an historic route (the Welver–Sterkrade railway, which was built by the Royal Westphalian Railway Company) and therefore does not run through the current Dortmund Hauptbahnhof. S4 services running from Unna and S2 services running from Dortmund Hauptbahnhof therefore wait at the station to allow interchange; similarly S4 services running from Lütgendortmund and S2 services running from Herne also wait. Interchange is possible in each case across the same platform. The S1 runs through an underground station and is connected by stairs and lifts with the platforms of the other lines.

In addition the S-Bahn station is also connected by three bus routes operated by Dortmunder Stadtwerke (DSW21). Routes 447, 465 and 466 also run at twenty-minute intervals from Monday to Friday during the day and every half-hour during the early and late hours and on Saturdays, Sundays and public holidays.

== History ==
The first station in Dortmund-Dorstfeld was already opened by 1874, but it no longer exists. The current station was opened on 24 September 1983, when the S1, which until then ended at Bochum, was extended to Dortmund. It does not use the old line of the Bergisch-Märkische Railway Company but a new line built in the 1980s that runs through tunnels and over many structures to give access to the Technical University of Dortmund. On 25 May 1984, the S4 service commenced on an above-ground route, which had previously been operated by class 212 locomotives, hauling Silberling carriages. On 3 June 1991, line S2 was opened between Dortmund-Dorstfeld and the Dortmund-Mengede, not running on the old line of the Cologne-Minden Railway Company, but a new line, which was built by Deutsche Bundesbahn in order to improve services to northwest Dortmund.

== Current situation ==
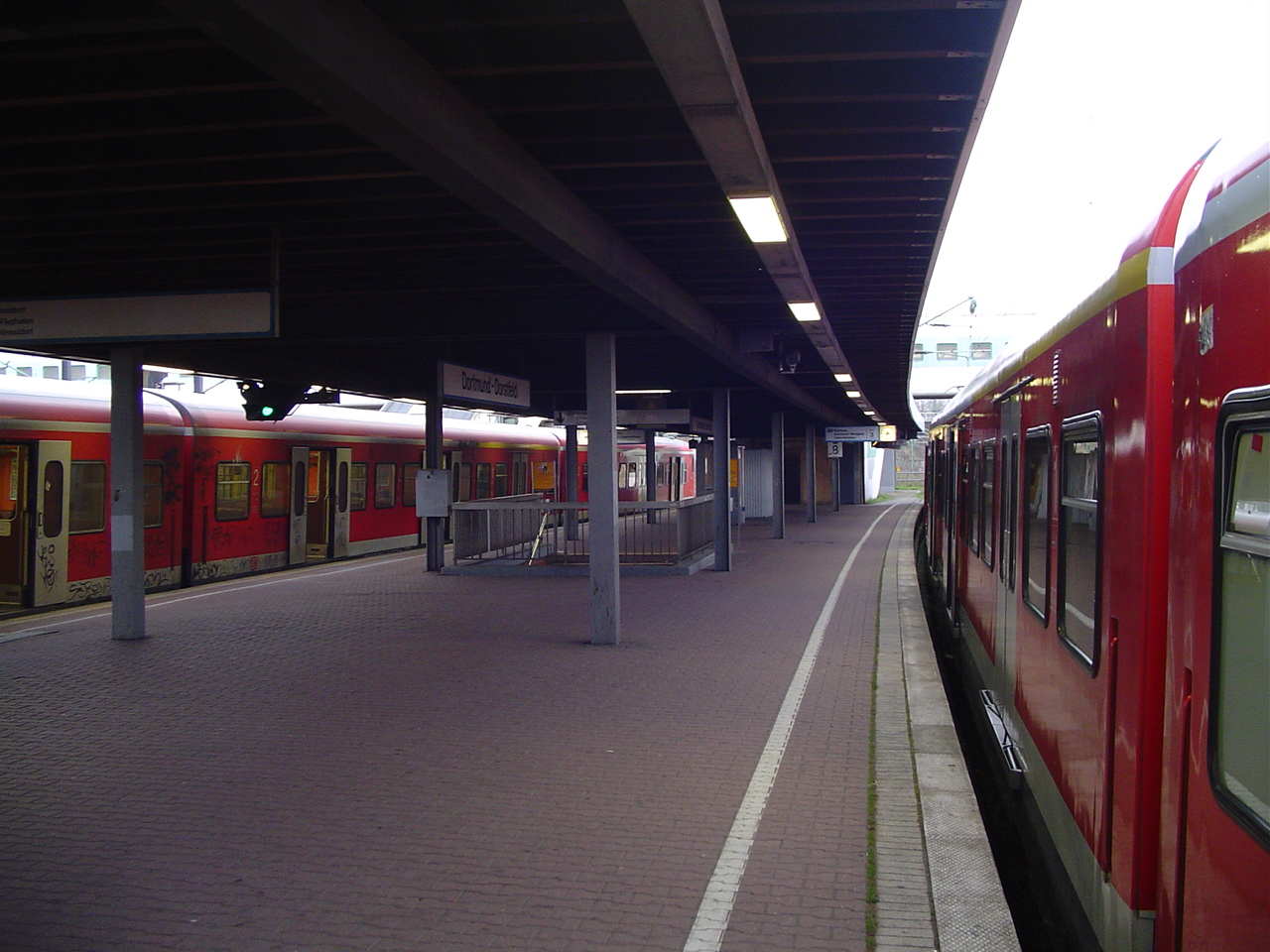
Dortmund-Dorstfeld station in 2006. Interchange between the S2 and S4 lines.

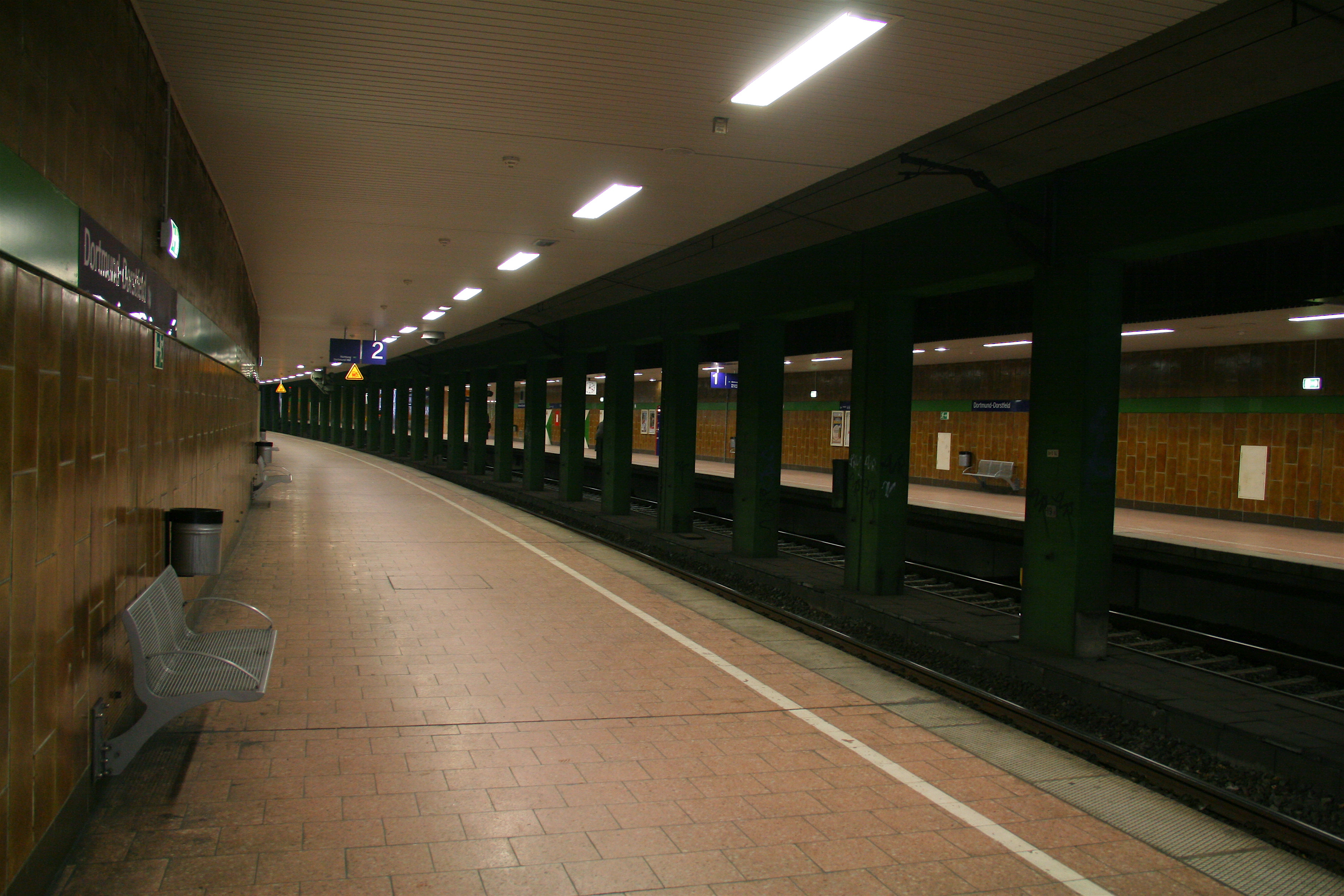
Underground platforms (S1) of Dortmund-Dorstfeld station in 2010.

The entrance building is built over the tracks and has stairs and lifts to all platforms. It was built by Deutsche Bundesbahn in the 80s, when the S-Bahn was introduced in Dortmund. There is no historic station building. The station is only served by the S1 line of the Rhine-Ruhr S-Bahn. It is classified by Deutsche Bahn as a category 3 station.

== Rail services ==
It is served by Rhine-Ruhr S-Bahn lines S1, S2 and S4.

== Signal box ==
The Ddf (standing for Dortmund-Dorstfeld, Fahrdienstleiter, “dispatcher”) signal box (class Sp Dr S 60) was opened in 1983 with the station. It is situated on the above ground part of the station. In addition to Dorstfeld station, it controls Lütgendortmund station, Huckarde Süd junction and the remaining part of the nearby Dortmunderfeld marshalling yard. The mainline portion of Ddf signal box is remotely controlled from Dhf signal box (at Dortmund Hauptbahnhof).
