= S4 (Rhine-Ruhr S-Bahn) =

Line S 4 is an S-Bahn of the Rhine-Ruhr S-Bahn, running from Unna to the Dortmund suburb of Dortmund-Lütgendortmund. It is operated by DB Regio on behalf of Verkehrsverbund Rhein-Ruhr. It is operated at 30-minute intervals (15-minute intervals in the peak between Dortmund-Lütgendortmund and Unna-Königsborn) using class 422 four-car electrical multiple units.

Line S 4 runs over several lines:

- from Dortmund-Lütgendortmund to Dortmund-Germania over the new S-Bahn line (2213), opened by Deutsche Bahn on 2 May 1993,
- from Dortmund-Germania to Dortmund Stadthaus over the Rhenish Ruhr line, opened by the Rhenish Railway Company on 19 November 1874,
- from Dortmund Stadthaus to Unna-Königsborn over the Welver–Sterkrade line opened by the Royal Westphalian Railway Company on 15 May 1876,
- from Unna-Königsborn to Unna over the Fröndenberg–Kamen line opened by the Prussian state railways between 2 January 1899 and 1 November 1900.

S-Bahn services commenced between old Lütgendortmund station and Unna station on 3 June 1984. The section from Germania to old Lütgendortmund station was closed on 31 August 1987 and operations on the new line to Lütgendortmund commenced on 23 May 1993.

Extension of the S 4 line from its current western end in the tunnel at Dortmund-Lütgendortmund was formerly planned to be implemented with a target of opening it in 2015. This would have included an extension of the single-track tunnel to the immediate south of Dortmund-Bövinghausen station. The S 4 would run from there to Herne on the Duisburg-Ruhrort–Dortmund railway (the Emscher Valley Railway of the Cologne-Minden Railway Company) and there take over the Herne–Essen branch of the current S 2 line. The Emschertal-Bahn (RB 43) Regionalbahn service would only operate between Herne and Dorsten. The eastern section of the Emscher Valley Railway between Dortmund-Bövinghausen and Dortmund Hauptbahnhof would be used by a new line of the Dortmund Stadtbahn. For a long time funds have been available for the construction of the line to Bövinghausen, however, the financing for the operation of the line is not guaranteed. The Emschertal-Bahn runs between Dortmund-Bövinghausen and Herne every hour, but the S2 would run between Herne and Essen every twenty minute as an S-Bahn service, so the Verkehrsverbund Rhein-Ruhr would have to fund the increased services through savings in other areas. Upon taking office, the transport minister Oliver Wittke called for all such proposals to be re-evaluated. The line extension has been removed from the integrated transportation plan for North Rhine-Westphalia; a resubmission is possible from 2015.
