= Osterath–Dortmund Süd railway =

Railway line in Germany

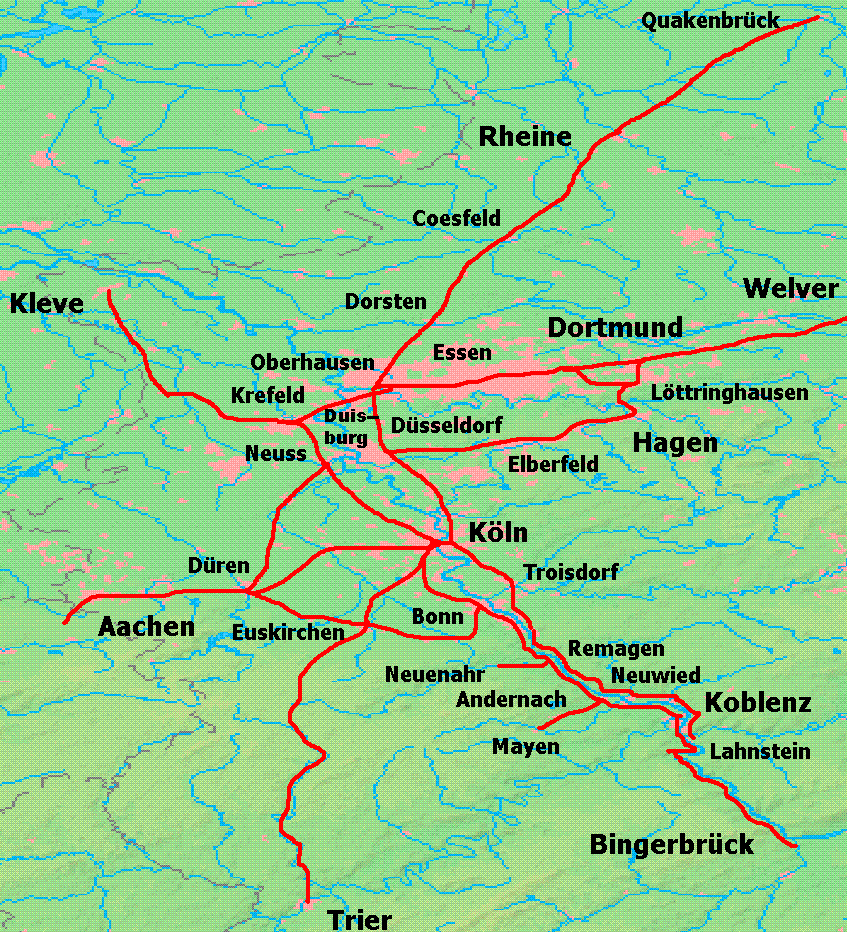
- Network of the former Rhenish Railway Company

Overview
- Line number: 2610 (Osterath – Lohbruch); 2504 (Lohbruch – DU-Rheinhausen); 2505 (DU-Rheinhausen – BO Nord); 2151 (BO Nord – DO-Dorstfeld); 2126 (DO-Dorstfeld – DO Süd); Connecting lines: 2312 (DU-Hochfeld Süd – DU Hbf); 2326 (DU Hbf – DU-Hochfeld Süd Vorbf)
- Locale: North Rhine-Westphalia, Germany

Service
- Route number: 425 (KR-Oppum – DU Hbf); 450.4 (DO-Lüttgendortmund – DO Süd)

Technical
- Line length: 76 km (47 mi)
- Track gauge: 1,435 mm (4 ft 8 1/2 in) standard gauge
- Operating speed: 120 km/h (74.6 mph) or 80 km/h (49.7 mph)

The Osterath–Dortmund-Süd railway is a historically significant line in the German state of North Rhine-Westphalia. Parts of it are closed, much of it is now used for freight only, but several sections are still used for Regional-Express, Regionalbahn or Rhine-Ruhr S-Bahn services.

The nearly 76 kilometre long line was built in three stages between 1866 and 1874 by the Rhenish Railway Company (German: Rheinische Eisenbahn-Gesellschaft, RhE), creating a third major east-west line through the Ruhr area. It was intended to compete effectively with the established and profitable lines of its competitors—the Duisburg–Dortmund line of the Cologne-Minden Railway Company and the Ruhr line of Bergisch-Märkische Railway Company, but it was not successful.

== History ==
The Rhenish Railway concentrated for a long time left on the territories next to the Rhine, leaving the Ruhr area with its coal mines and emerging industries to be opened up by the Cologne-Minden and the Bergisch-Märkische railway companies. The RhE wanted to penetrate this lucrative market and began building the Rurh line from its Osterath station on its Lower Left Rhine line.

Between the port of Mülheim and Essen's Graf Beust colliery, the line used the route of a horse-hauled railway operated by the colliery from 1853 to 1865.

Rhenish Railway Company
23 August 1866	(2610)	Osterath – Lohbruch
1 September 1866	(2505)	Osterath – Essen RhE
	including Rheinhausen-Hochfeld train ferry (now Kultushafen)
1 January 1868	(2505)	Essen RhE – Wattenscheid RhE
15 February 1870	(2312)	Hochfeld Süd – Duisburg RhE
	branch line, beginning of line to Quakenbrück
1 June 1872	(2168)	Essen-Kray Nord – Gelsenkirchen RhE
15 October 1874	(2505)	Wattenscheid RhE – Bochum RhE
19 November 1874	(2151)	Bochum RhE – Dortmund-Dorstfeld (old)
19 November 1874	(2126)	Dortmund-Dorstfeld (old) – Dortmund RhE
Rhine-Ruhr S-Bahn
3 July 1984	(2213)	Dortmund-Germania – Dortmund-Dorstfeld
23 May 1993	(2213)	Dortmund-Lütgendortmund – Dortmund-Germania

== Current situation ==
Little passenger traffic developed on the line due to the parallel railway of the Bergisch-Märkische Railway Company. Passenger services were abandoned on the section between Mülheim-Heißen and Essen-Kray-Nord in 1959, between Essen-Kray Nord and Bochum Präsident in 1965 and between Bochum Präsident and Bochum-Langendreer in 1979.

Until 30 May 1986, accumulator railcars of class 515 ran between Duisburg-Rheinhausen and Hohenbudberg Siedlung. Then the Rhenish line from Krefeld-Linn to the former Hohenbudberg marshalling yard was completely dismantled along with the yard. Instead, the line now uses the parallel route of the Ruhrort-Crefeld District Gladbach Railway Company (Ruhrort–Crefeld−Kreis Gladbach Eisenbahngesellschaft).

Four services operate each hour on the RhE line between Duisburg and Rheinhausen: the line from Mönchengladbach is served by the Niers-Haard-Express (RE 42), the Rhein-Niers-Bahn (RB 33) and the Emscher-Niederrhein-Bahn (RB 35) services and the Der Niederrheiner (RB 31) service connects with the Lower Rhine Railway. After crossing over the Rhine on the Duisburg-Hochfeld Railway Bridge, which was destroyed in the Second World War and then rebuilt, all passenger trains leave the main line and continue on the branch line built in 1870 to Duisburg Hauptbahnhof.

The section of the Rhenish line from Duisburg-Hochfeld Süd to Mülheim (Ruhr) Hauptbahnhof was closed down in several stages and where it is still open it is used mainly for freight operations. As part of the merger that created the University of Duisburg-Essen there were brief but inconclusive discussions on creating a direct transport link on the route from Duisburg-Neudorf via Speldorf, Mülheim Hauptbahnhof and Heißen to Essen Nord, connecting the two campuses. Meanwhile, the overall line between Speldorf and Mülheim Hauptbahnhof was dismantled.

In Essen, the line has been interrupted several times, the bridges over Segeroth-Strasse and Hans-Böckler-Strasse were demolished and the new Berthold-Beitz-Boulevard was built on the line’s embankment. The Essen-Nord station and its two signal boxes have been decommissioned and demolished and in its place the new university district has been built. The main line from Essen-Nord to Essen-Kray Nord has been closed along with Essen-Nord station and signals have been removed from the station platforms at Essen-Kray Nord station. Essen-Kray Nord and the Goldschmidt plant can still be accessed via Essen-Nord.

The Rhenish line east of Essen-Kray station running towards Bochum has also been demolished. Thus the railway bridge of the Rhenish line over the A40 in Bochum-Stahlhausen has already been removed during the upgrading of the autobahn.

The easternmost section of the line between Dortmund Dorstfeld (high level) and Dortmund Süd station has been upgraded for the S-Bahn S 4 and extended to Dortmund Lütgendortmund and is served by the S-Bahn at 20-minute intervals. From Dortmund Süd, the S 4 uses the line to Welver of the former Royal Westphalian Railway Company (Königlich-Westfälische Eisenbahn, KWE) to Unna-Königsborn and then the Fröndenberg–Kamen railway to Unna station.

The low level of Dortmund-Dorstfeld station is connected by S-Bahn services from Dortmund Hauptbahnhof: line S 1 runs to Essen Hauptbahnhof on the Bergisch-Märkische line and line S 2 runs to Herne station on the line to Dortmund-Mengede.

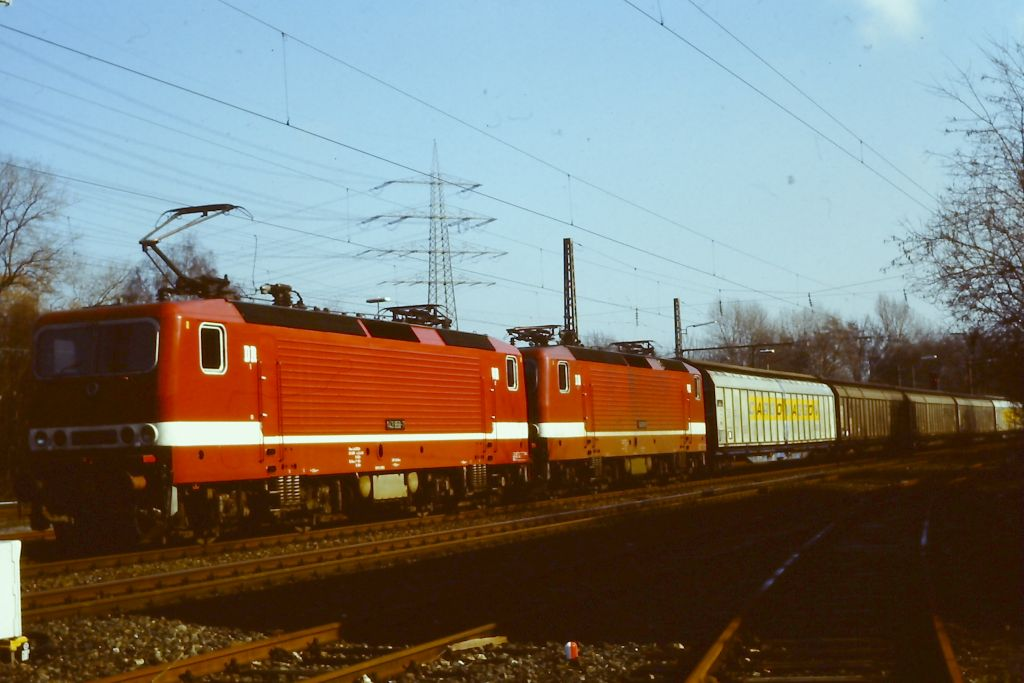
Freight train in Gelsenkirchen-Wattenscheid in 1993

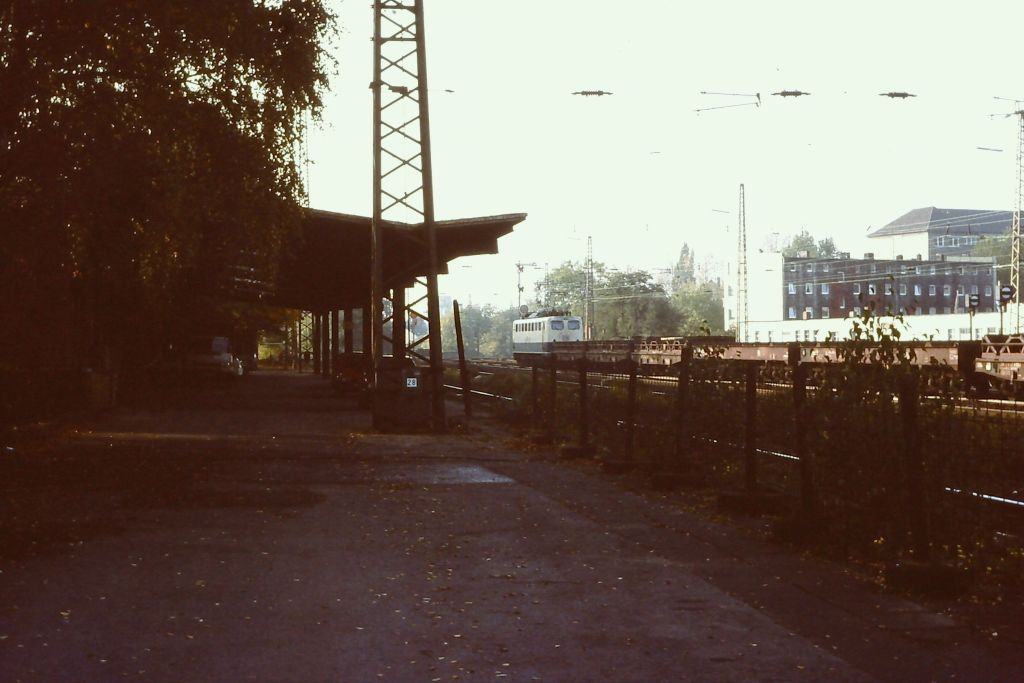
Bochum-Nord station in 1995
