= Verkehrsverbund Rhein-Ruhr =

German public transport association in North Rhine-Westphalia

- Logo

- area in North Rhine-Westphalia the VRR is commissioned for public transport
- Abbreviation: VRR
- Named after: rivers Rhine and Ruhr
- Formation: VRR AöR: September 2004
- Dissolved: VRR GmbH: January 1980 to September 2006
- Type: Statutory corporation
- Legal status: Body corporate
- Headquarters: Gelsenkirchen, Germany
- Region served: Ruhr, Lower Rhine region, parts of the Rhine-Ruhr
- CEO: Oliver Wittke
- Subsidiaries: ZV VRR Eigenbetrieb Fahrzeuge und Infrastruktur
- Website: www.vrr.de

Verkehrsverbund Rhein-Ruhr (VRR) (German: [fɐˈkeːɐ̯sfɐˌbʊnt ˌʁaɪ̯n ˈʁuːɐ̯]), is a public transport association (Verkehrsverbund) in the German state of North Rhine-Westphalia. It covers large parts of the Ruhr area, the Lower Rhine region including Düsseldorf and the Rhine-Ruhr conurbation. It was founded on 1 January 1980, and is Europe’s largest public Transport association, covering an area of some 7,305 km^{2} (2,820 sq mi) with around 7.8 million inhabitants, spanning as far as Dorsten in the north, Dortmund in the east, Langenfeld in the south, and the Dutch border in the west and northwest.

== Structure and responsibilities ==
The VRR is tasked with coordinating public transport in its area. This means the following:

- setting and developing the fare system (VRR tariff)
  - redistributing ticket revenue onto the transport companies
- coordinating local train services (Schienenpersonennahverkehr, SPNV) within its area as public service obligations (PSO)
- integrating the public transport system
  - setting standards and guidelines for passenger information and bus/tram stop facilities
  - coordination between transport companies, local authorities and Land authorities
- financing partial subsidies for bus and tram companies according to § 11 (2) and § 11a ÖPNVG NRW
- coordinating Land subsidies to transport companies and local authorities according to § 12 and § 13 ÖPNVG NRW

=== Governance ===
The member cities and districts of the public transport association VRR are:

- cities
  - Bochum
  - Bottrop
  - Dortmund
  - Duisburg
  - Düsseldorf
  - Essen
  - Gelsenkirchen
  - Hagen
  - Herne
  - Krefeld
  - Mönchengladbach
  - Mülheim (Ruhr)
  - Oberhausen
  - Remscheid
  - Solingen
  - Wuppertal
- districts
  - Ennepe-Ruhr
  - Kleve
  - Mettmann
  - Recklinghausen
  - Rhine-District Neuss
  - Viersen
  - Wesel

The municipal and district councils send representatives to the two special purpose associations’ councils, which in turn elect the main decision making corporations, the administrative council of the VRR, and other committees. The administrative council elects the administrative board of the VRR, currently Oliver Wittke who also is their speaker.

In addition, there are departments within the VRR dealing with different matters, such as marketing or law. Two Land institutions are located within the VRR structure: Kompetenzcenter Digitalisierung NRW (KCD) and Kompetenzcenter Sicherheit (KCS).

Through the ZV VRR Eigenbetrieb Fahrzeuge und Infrastruktur (ZV VRR FaIn-EB), the VRR also buys and/or owns the rolling stock for some, but not all, of its PSO rail operations.

=== Former governance ===
Before 2026, two spare subsidiaries named Zweckverband Verkehrsverbund Rhein-Ruhr (ZV VRR) and Nahverkehrs-Zweckverband Niederrhein (ZV NVN) formed the public transport association VRR shared responsibility for public transport related tasks. ZV NVN was responsible for the districts Kleve and Wesel while ZV VRR was commissioned for all other municipals.

=== Transport companies ===
These above mentioned cities’ and districts’ and other associated transport companies thus operate under the VRR fare scheme:

- Bahnen der Stadt Monheim GmbH
- Bochum-Gelsenkirchener Straßenbahnen AG
- BVR Busverkehr Rheinland GmbH
- DB Regio AG
- „Der vom Niederrhein“ – Omnibusreisen
- DSW21 (Dortmunder Stadtwerke AG)
- Duisburger Verkehrsgesellschaft AG
- Eurobahn GmbH & Co. KG
- Ruhrbahn GmbH
- Flughafen Düsseldorf GmbH
- Hagener Straßenbahn AG
- Keolis Deutschland GmbH & Co. KG
- Kreisverkehrsgesellschaft Mettmann mbH
- National Express Rail GmbH
- Niederrheinische Verkehrsbetriebe Aktiengesellschaft NIAG
- Niederrheinische Versorgung und Verkehr AG
- Niederrheinwerke Viersen mobil GmbH
- NordWestBahn GmbH
- Regiobahn Fahrbetriebsgesellschaft mbH
- Rheinbahn AG
- RVN Regionalverkehr Niederrhein GmbH
- StadtBus Dormagen GmbH
- Stadtwerke Goch GmbH
- Stadtwerke Kevelaer
- Stadtwerke Neuss GmbH
- Stadtwerke Oberhausen AG
- Stadtwerke Remscheid GmbH
- Stadtwerke Solingen GmbH – Verkehrsbetrieb
- Städtische Dienste Geldern – Verkehrsvertrieb
- Straßenbahn Herne-Castrop-Rauxel GmbH
- SWK MOBIL GmbH
- Transdev Rhein-Ruhr (Rhein-Ruhr-Bahn)
- Train Rental GmbH
- Verkehrsgesellschaft Ennepe-Ruhr mbH
- Verkehrsgesellschaft Hilden GmbH
- Verkehrsgesellschaft der Stadt Velbert mbH
- Versorgungs- und Verkehrsbetrieb der Stadt Straelen
- Vestische Straßenbahnen GmbH
- Verkehrsbetrieb Wachtendonk
- VIAS Rail GmbH
- WSW mobil GmbH

Additionally, there are several districts and cities outside the area of VRR which tariff applies for, but only while travelling with a transport vehicle from/to the area of VRR. Unless specified separately, this regulation counts for all lines.

=== Line numbering scheme ===
With the introduction of the VRR in 1980 a new line numbering system for all bus, tram and Stadtbahn (underground) lines in the VRR area was introduced. The VRR has been divided into ten three-digit numbering scheme regions, the first digit in the line number representing that numbering scheme Region (key number). The last two digits form the individual line number. These are the existing key numbers:

- 1: Essen and Mülheim
- 2: Kreis Recklinghausen, Bottrop and northern Gelsenkirchen
- 3: Bochum, southern Gelsenkirchen, parts of the Ennepe-Ruhr-Kreis and Herne
- 4: Dortmund
- 5: Hagen and main part of the Ennepe-Ruhr-Kreis
- 6: Wuppertal, Solingen and Remscheid
- 7: Düsseldorf and Kreis Mettmann
- 8: Düsseldorf and Rhein-Kreis Neuss
- 9: Duisburg and Oberhausen
- 0: Mönchengladbach, Krefeld and Kreis Viersen
- no key number: Kreis Kleve and Kreis Wesel

Stadtbahn lines are identified with the prefix “U” followed by the key number and a one-digit identifiers. Wuppertal's suspension railway line is officially line 60, but because it does not run underground, the prefix U is not used.

After the integration of the former Verkehrsgemeinschaft Niederrhein (VGN) area consisting of Kleve and Wesel, route numbers were unchanged, i.e. representing no key number.

- Express buses are called Schnellbus and have the prefix SB followed by two digits. None of these digits is a key number.
- Semi-fast buses are called City-Express and have the prefix CE followed by two digits. As with the express buses none of the digits is a key number.
- On demand buses (and also Taxis) have the prefixes ALT, AST or TB.
- In some cities the local buses have an own numbering system, e.g. the buses in Velbert, whose line number consists of the prefix OV, followed by one or two digits.
- In some cities the night buses are called NachtExpress (NE).

== Pricing ==
=== Fare sheme ===
The VRR is divided into two-digit fare zones and sells tickets based on the three different fare levels represented by their three letters A, B and C.

fare levels
City Fare level A	Destination Either fare level A	Destination Fare level B
Alpen	Sonsbeck; Xanten	Emmerich; Geldern; Hamminkeln; Issum; Kalkar; Kamp-Lintfort; Kevelaer; Neukirchen-Vluyn; Rees; Rheinberg; Uedem; Weeze; Wesel
Bedburg-Hau	Kleve	Emmerich; Goch; Kalkar; Kranenburg; Millingen a. d. Rijn; Rees; Uedem
Bochum	–	Castrop-Rauxel; Dortmund; Essen; Gelsenkirchen; Hattingen; Herdecke; Herne; Herten; Recklinghausen; Sprockhövel; Wetter; Witten
Bottrop	Gladbeck	Dinslaken; Dorsten; Essen; Gelsenkirchen; Hünxe; Oberhausen; Schermbeck; Voerde
Breckerfeld	Ennepetal; Gevelsberg; Schwelm	Hagen; Hattingen; Herdecke; Sprockhövel; Wetter; Witten; Wuppertal
Brüggen	Nettetal	Grefrath; Kempen; Kerken; Niederkrüchten; Rheurdt; Schwalmtal; Straelen; Tönisvorst; Venlo; Viersen; Wachtendonk
Castrop-Rauxel	Herne	Bochum; Datteln; Dortmund; Essen; Gelsenkirchen; Herdecke; Herten; Marl; Oer-Erkenschwick; Recklinghausen; Waltrop; Wetter; Witten
Datteln	Oer-Erkenschwick; Waltrop	Castrop-Rauxel; Dortmund; Haltern; Herne; Herten; Lünen; Marl; Olfen; Recklinghausen
Dinslaken	Voerde	Bottrop; Duisburg; Gladbeck; Hamminkeln; Hünxe; Oberhausen; Schermbeck; Wesel
Dormagen	–	Düsseldorf; Grevenbroich; Kaarst; Langenfeld; Monheim; Neuss; Rommerskirchen
Dorsten	–	Borken; Bottrop; Gelsenkirchen; Gladbeck; Haltern; Heiden; Herten; Hünxe; Marl; Raesfeld; Recklinghausen; Reken; Schermbeck
Dortmund	–	Bergkamen; Bochum; Castrop-Rauxel; Datteln; Hagen; Herdecke; Herne; Holzwickede; Kamen; Lünen; Oer-Erkenschwick; Schwerte; Unna; Waltrop; Wetter; Witten
Duisburg	–	Dinslaken; Düsseldorf; Heiligenhaus; Krefeld; Moers; Mülheim (Ruhr); Oberhausen; Ratingen; Rheinberg; Voerde
Düsseldorf	–	Dormagen; Duisburg; Erkrath; Haan; Heiligenhaus; Hilden; Kaarst; Langenfeld; Meerbusch; Mettmann; Monheim; Neuss; Ratingen; Wülfrath
Emmerich	Rees	Bedburg-Hau; Hamminkeln; Isselburg; Kalkar; Kleve ’s-Heerenberg; Uedem; Wesel; Zevenaar
Ennepetal	Breckerfeld; Gevelsberg; Schwelm	Hagen; Hattingen; Herdecke; Sprockhövel; Wetter; Witten; Wuppertal
Erkrath	Haan; Hilden	Düsseldorf; Langenfeld; Mettmann; Monheim; Solingen; Wülfrath; Wuppertal
Essen	–	Bochum; Bottrop; Castrop-Rauxel; Gelsenkirchen; Gladbeck; Hattingen; Heiligenhaus; Herne; Mülheim (Ruhr); Oberhausen; Ratingen; Sprockhövel; Velbert
Geldern	Issum	Alpen; Kamp-Lintfort; Kerken; Kevelaer; Neukirchen-Vluyn; Rheurdt; Sonsbeck; Straelen; Wachtendonk; Weeze; Xanten
Gelsenkirchen	–	Bochum; Bottrop; Castrop-Rauxel; Dorsten; Essen; Gladbeck; Herne; Herten; Marl; Recklinghausen
Gevelsberg	Breckerfeld; Ennepetal; Schwelm	Hagen; Hattingen; Herdecke; Sprockhövel; Wetter; Witten; Wuppertal
Gladbeck	Bottrop	Dinslaken; Dorsten; Essen; Gelsenkirchen; Hünxe; Oberhausen; Schermbeck; Voerde
Goch	Kranenburg	Bedburg-Hau; Groesbeek; Kalkar; Kevelaer; Kleve; Millingen a. d. Rijn; Nijmegen; Uedem; Weeze
Grefrath	Kempen; Tönisvorst	Brüggen; Kamp-Lintfort; Kerken; Krefeld; Nettetal; Neukirchen-Vluyn; Rheurdt; Straelen; Viersen; Wachtendonk; Willich
Grevenbroich	–	Dormagen; Jüchen; Kaarst; Korschenbroich; Neuss; Rommerskirchen
Haan	Erkrath; Hilden	Düsseldorf; Langenfeld; Mettmann; Monheim; Solingen; Wülfrath; Wuppertal
Hagen	–	Breckerfeld; Dortmund; Ennepetal; Gevelsberg; Herdecke; Holzwickede; Schwelm; Schwerte; Wetter; Witten
Haltern	–	Datteln; Dorsten; Dülmen; Herten; Marl; Oer-Erkenschwick; Olfen; Recklinghausen; Reken; Waltrop
Hamminkeln	Wesel	Alpen; Bocholt; Dinslaken; Emmerich; Hünxe; Isselburg; Raesfeld; Rees; Rhede; Rheinberg; Schermbeck; Sonsbeck; Voerde; Xanten
Hattingen	Sprockhövel	Bochum; Breckerfeld; Ennepetal; Essen; Gevelsberg; Herdecke; Schwelm; Velbert; Wetter; Witten; Wuppertal
Heiligenhaus	Ratingen	Duisburg; Düsseldorf; Essen; Mettmann; Mülheim (Ruhr); Velbert; Wülfrath
Herdecke	Wetter; Witten	Bochum; Breckerfeld; Castrop-Rauxel; Dortmund; Ennepetal; Gevelsberg; Hagen; Hattingen; Herne; Schwelm; Sprockhövel
Herne	Castrop-Rauxel	Bochum; Datteln; Dortmund; Essen; Gelsenkirchen; Herdecke; Herten; Marl; Oer-Erkenschwick; Recklinghausen; Waltrop; Wetter; Witten
Herten	Recklinghausen	Bochum; Castrop-Rauxel; Datteln; Dorsten; Gelsenkirchen; Haltern; Herne; Marl; Oer-Erkenschwick; Waltrop
Hilden	Erkrath; Haan	Düsseldorf; Langenfeld; Mettmann; Monheim; Solingen; Wülfrath; Wuppertal
Hünxe	Schermbeck	Bottrop; Dinslaken; Dorsten; Gladbeck; Hamminkeln; Raesfeld; Voerde; Wesel
Issum	Geldern	Alpen; Kamp-Lintfort; Kerken; Kevelaer; Neukirchen-Vluyn; Rheurdt; Sonsbeck; Straelen; Wachtendonk; Weeze; Xanten
Jüchen	–	Grevenbroich; Korschenbroich; Mönchengladbach
Kaarst	Neuss	Dormagen; Düsseldorf; Grevenbroich; Jüchen; Korschenbroich; Meerbusch; Rommerskirchen; Willich
Kalkar	Uedem	Alpen; Bedburg-Hau; Emmerich; Goch; Kevelaer; Kleve; Kranenburg; Rees; Sonsbeck; Weeze; Xanten
Kamp-Lintfort	Neukirchen-Vluyn	Alpen; Geldern; Grefrath; Issum; Kempen; Kerken; Krefeld; Moers; Rheinberg; Rheurdt; Sonsbeck; Straelen; Tönisvorst; Wachtendonk; Xanten
Kempen	Grefrath; Tönisvorst	Brüggen; Kamp-Lintfort; Kerken; Krefeld; Nettetal; Neukirchen-Vluyn; Rheurdt; Straelen; Viersen; Wachtendonk; Willich
Kerken	Rheurdt; Straelen; Wachtendonk	Brüggen; Geldern; Grefrath; Issum; Kamp-Lintfort; Kempen; Nettetal; Neukirchen-Vluyn; Tönisvorst; Venlo
Kevelaer	Weeze	Alpen; Gelderm; Goch; Issum; Kalkar; Kranenburg; Sonsbeck; Uedem; Xanten
Kleve	Bedburg-Hau	Emmerich; Goch; Kalkar; Kranenburg; Millingen a. d. Rijn; Rees; Uedem
Korschenbroich	–	Grevenbroich; Jüchen; Kaarst; Meerbusch; Mönchengladbach; Neuss; Viersen; Willich
Kranenburg	Goch	Bedburg-Hau; Groesbeek; Kalkar; Kevelaer; Kleve; Millingen a. d. Rijn; Nijmegen; Uedem; Weeze
Krefeld	–	Duisburg; Grefrath; Kamp-Lintfort; Kempen; Meerbusch; Moers; Neukirchen-Vluyn; Tönisvorst; Willich
Langenfeld	Monheim	Dormagen; Düsseldorf; Erkrath; Haan; Hilden; Solingen
Marl	–	Bottrop; Castrop-Rauxel; Datteln; Dorsten; Gelsenkirchen; Gladbeck; Haltern; Herne; Herten; Oer-Erkenschwick; Recklinghausen; Waltrop
Meerbusch	–	Düsseldorf; Kaarst; Korschenbroich; Krefeld; Neuss; Willich
Mettmann	Wülfrath	Düsseldorf; Erkrath; Haan; Heiligenhaus; Hilden; Ratingen; Solingen; Velbert; Wuppertal
Moers	–	Duisburg; Kamp-Lintfort; Krefeld; Neukirchen-Vluyn; Rheinberg
Mönchengladbach	–	Jüchen; Korschenbroich; Niederkrüchten; Schwalmtal; Viersen; Wegberg; Willich
Monheim	Langenfeld	Dormagen; Düsseldorf; Erkrath; Haan; Hilden; Solingen
Mülheim (Ruhr)	–	Duisburg; Essen; Heiligenhaus; Oberhausen; Ratingen
Nettetal	Brüggen	Grefrath; Kempen; Kerken; Niederkrüchten; Rheurdt; Schwalmtal; Straelen; Tönisvorst; Venlo; Viersen; Wachtendonk
Neukirchen-Vluyn	Kamp-Lintfort	Alpen; Geldern; Grefrath; Issum; Kempen; Kerken; Krefeld; Moers; Rheinberg; Rheurdt; Sonsbeck; Straelen; Tönisvorst; Wachtendonk; Xanten
Neuss	Kaarst	Dormagen; Düsseldorf; Grevenbroich; Jüchen; Korschenbroich; Meerbusch; Rommerskirchen; Willich
Niederkrüchten	Schwalmtal	Brüggen; Mönchengladbach; Nettetal; Viersen; Wegberg
Oberhausen	–	Bottrop; Dinslaken; Duisburg; Essen; Gladbeck; Mülheim (Ruhr); Voerde
Oer-Erkenschwick	Datteln; Waltrop	Castrop-Rauxel; Dortmund; Haltern; Herne; Herten; Lünen; Marl; Olfen; Recklinghausen
Ratingen	Heiligenhaus	Duisburg; Düsseldorf; Essen; Mettmann; Mülheim (Ruhr); Velbert; Wülfrath
Recklinghausen	Herten	Bochum; Castrop-Rauxel; Datteln; Dorsten; Gelsenkirchen; Haltern; Herne; Marl; Oer-Erkenschwick; Waltrop
Rees	Emmerich	Bedburg-Hau; Hamminkeln; Isselburg; Kalkar; Kleve ’s-Heerenberg; Uedem; Wesel; Zevenaar
Remscheid	–	Solingen; Wuppertal
Rheinberg	–	Alpen; Duisburg; Hamminkeln; Kamp-Lintfort; Moers; Neukirchen-Vluyn; Sonsbeck; Wesel; Xanten
Rheurdt	Kerken; Straelen; Wachtendonk	Brüggen; Geldern; Grefrath; Issum; Kamp-Lintfort; Kempen; Nettetal; Neukirchen-Vluyn; Tönisvorst; Venlo
Rommerskirchen	–	Dormagen; Grevenbroich
Schermbeck	Hünxe	Bottrop; Dinslaken; Dorsten; Gladbeck; Hamminkeln; Raesfeld; Voerde; Wesel
Schwalmtal	Niederkrüchten	Brüggen; Mönchengladbach; Nettetal; Viersen; Wegberg
Schwelm	Breckerfeld; Ennepetal; Gevelsberg	Hagen; Hattingen; Herdecke; Sprockhövel; Wetter; Witten; Wuppertal
Solingen	–	Erkrath; Haan; Hilden; Langenfeld; Mettmann; Monheim; Remscheid; Wülfrath; Wuppertal
Sonsbeck	Alpen; Xanten	Emmerich; Geldern; Hamminkeln; Issum; Kalkar; Kamp-Lintfort; Kevelaer; Neukirchen-Vluyn; Rees; Rheinberg; Uedem; Weeze; Wesel
Sprockhövel	Hattingen	Bochum; Breckerfeld; Ennepetal; Essen; Gevelsberg; Herdecke; Schwelm; Velbert; Wetter; Witten; Wuppertal
Straelen	Kerken; Rheurdt; Wachtendonk	Brüggen; Geldern; Grefrath; Issum; Kamp-Lintfort; Kempen; Nettetal; Neukirchen-Vluyn; Tönisvorst; Venlo
Tönisvorst	Grefrath; Kempen	Brüggen; Kamp-Lintfort; Kerken; Krefeld; Nettetal; Neukirchen-Vluyn; Rheurdt; Straelen; Viersen; Wachtendonk; Willich
Uedem	Kalkar	Alpen; Bedburg-Hau; Emmerich; Goch; Kevelaer; Kleve; Kranenburg; Rees; Sonsbeck; Weeze; Xanten
Velbert	–	Essen; Hattingen; Heiligengaus; Mettmann; Ratingen; Sprockhövel; Wülfrath; Wuppertal
Viersen	–	Brüggen; Grefrath; Kempen; Korschenbroich; Mönchengladbach; Nettetal; Niederkrüchten; Schwalmtal; Tönisvorst; Willich
Voerde	Dinslaken	Bottrop; Duisburg; Gladbeck; Hamminkeln; Hünxe; Oberhausen; Schermbeck; Wesel
Wachtendonk	Kerken; Rheurdt; Straelen	Brüggen; Geldern; Grefrath; Issum; Kamp-Lintfort; Kempen; Nettetal; Neukirchen-Vluyn; Tönisvorst; Venlo
Waltrop	Datteln; Oer-Erkenschwick	Castrop-Rauxel; Dortmund; Haltern; Herne; Herten; Lünen; Marl; Olfen; Recklinghausen
Weeze	Kevelaer	Alpen; Gelderm; Goch; Issum; Kalkar; Kranenburg; Sonsbeck; Uedem; Xanten
Wesel	Hamminkeln	Alpen; Bocholt; Dinslaken; Emmerich; Hünxe; Isselburg; Raesfeld; Rees; Rhede; Rheinberg; Schermbeck; Sonsbeck; Voerde; Xanten
Wetter	Herdecke; Witten	Bochum; Breckerfeld; Castrop-Rauxel; Dortmund; Ennepetal; Gevelsberg; Hagen; Hattingen; Herne; Schwelm; Sprockhövel
Willich	–	Grefrath; Kaarst; Kempen; Korschenbroich; Krefeld; Meerbusch; Mönchengladbach; Neuss; Tönisvorst; Viersen
Witten	Herdecke; Wetter	Bochum; Breckerfeld; Castrop-Rauxel; Dortmund; Ennepetal; Gevelsberg; Hagen; Hattingen; Herne; Schwelm; Sprockhövel
Wülfrath	Mettmann	Düsseldorf; Erkrath; Haan; Heiligenhaus; Hilden; Ratingen; Solingen; Velbert; Wuppertal
Wuppertal	–	Breckerfeld; Ennepetal; Erkrath; Gevelsberg; Haan; Hattingen; Hilden; Mettmann; Remscheid; Schwelm; Solingen; Sprockhövel; Velbert; Wülfrath
Xanten	Alpen; Sonsbeck	Emmerich; Geldern; Hamminkeln; Issum; Kalkar; Kamp-Lintfort; Kevelaer; Neukirchen-Vluyn; Rees; Rheinberg; Uedem; Weeze; Wesel
Zevenaar	–	Arnhem; Emmerich; Rees ’s-Heerenberg
Fare level C applies respectively for not listed destinations.

=== Tickets ===
People younger than fifteen years pay lower fares. The VRR sells tickets for one single journey or for four consecutive journeys respectively. Tickets for 24 hours are also available. If the transportation of a bicycle is desired, the traveller has to buy a ticket for bicycles, valid for 24 hours. Before travelling, those tickets must be validated by nearby stamp boxes. The monthly ticket is called Ticket2000. The social discount variant is named SozialTicket, only valid in the district of residence. To expand the area of a monthly ticket temporarily, a supplement ticket called ZusatzTicket is needed per journey.

The digital variant is called eezy.nrw, working as a check-in system. Its product's name consists of the fictive respelling of the word easy and the abbreviation of the state North Rhine-Westphalia.

Furthermore, the VRR's transport association companies offer the nationwide Deutschlandticket.

== See also ==
- Rhine-Ruhr Stadtbahn
- Bochum Stadtbahn (BOGESTRA)
- Dortmund Stadtbahn
- Rheinbahn
- Essen: Public Transport
