= List of railway stations in North Rhine-Westphalia =

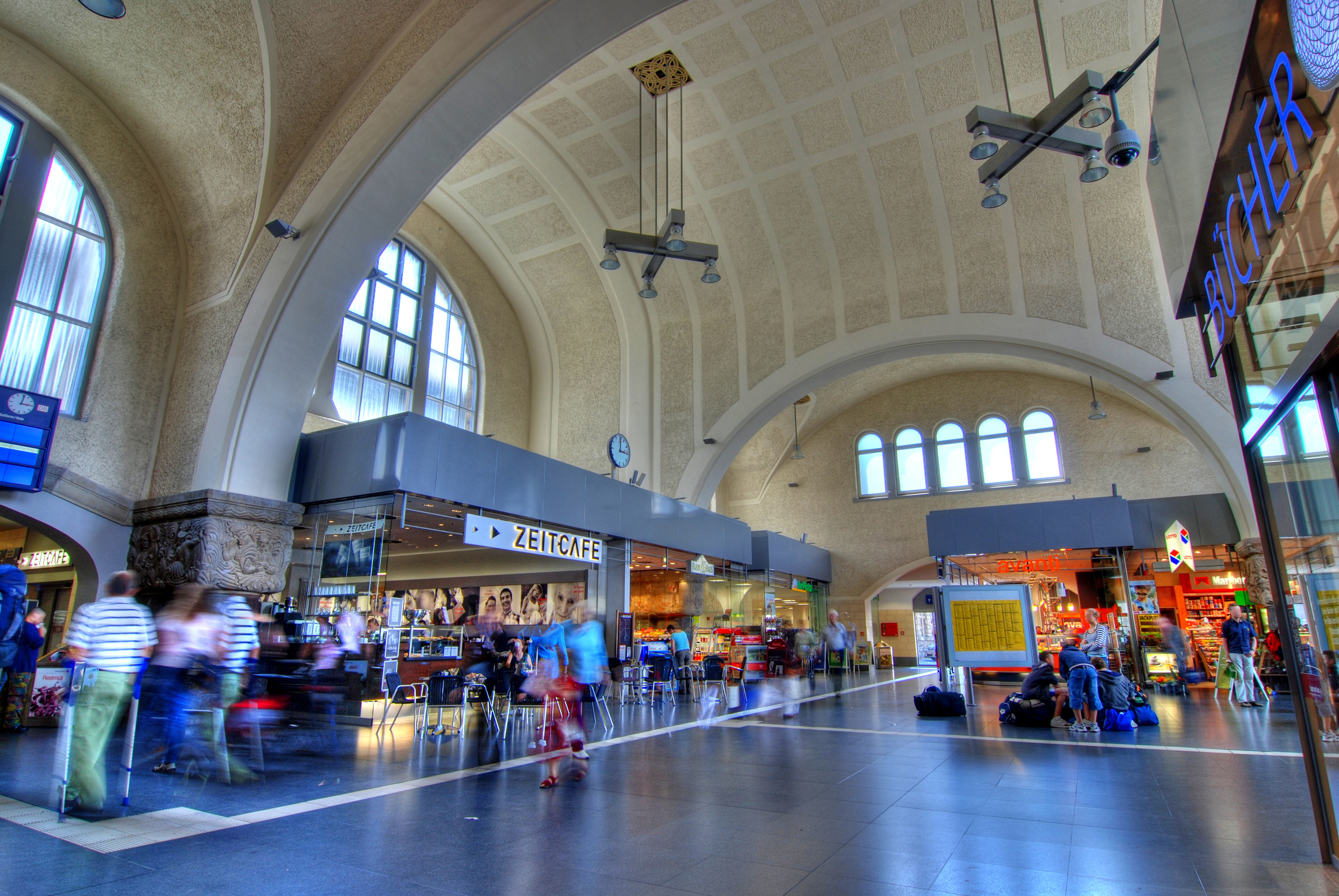
Interior of Aachen Hauptbahnhof (central station) after the rebuilding

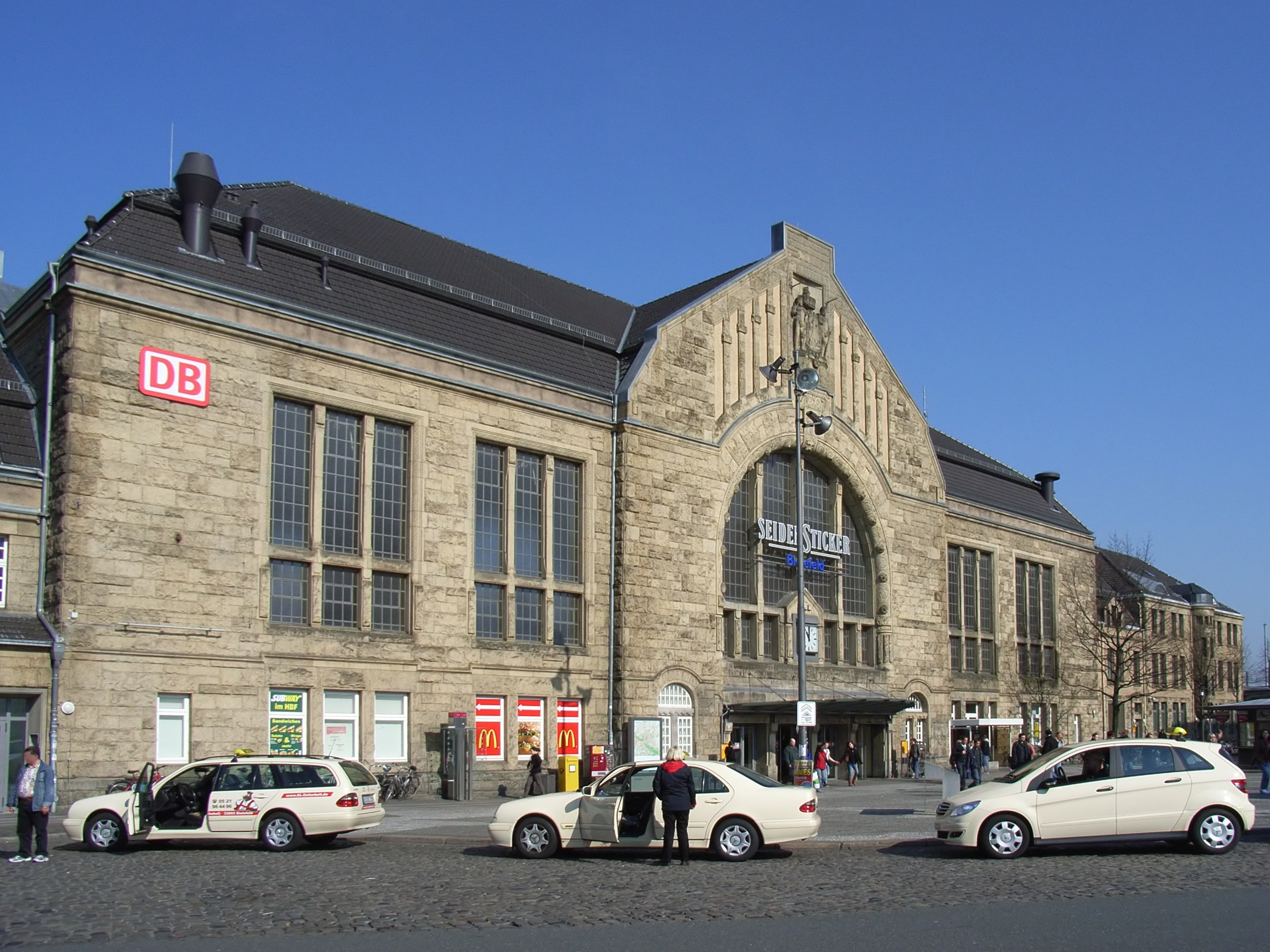
Bielefeld Hauptbahnhof

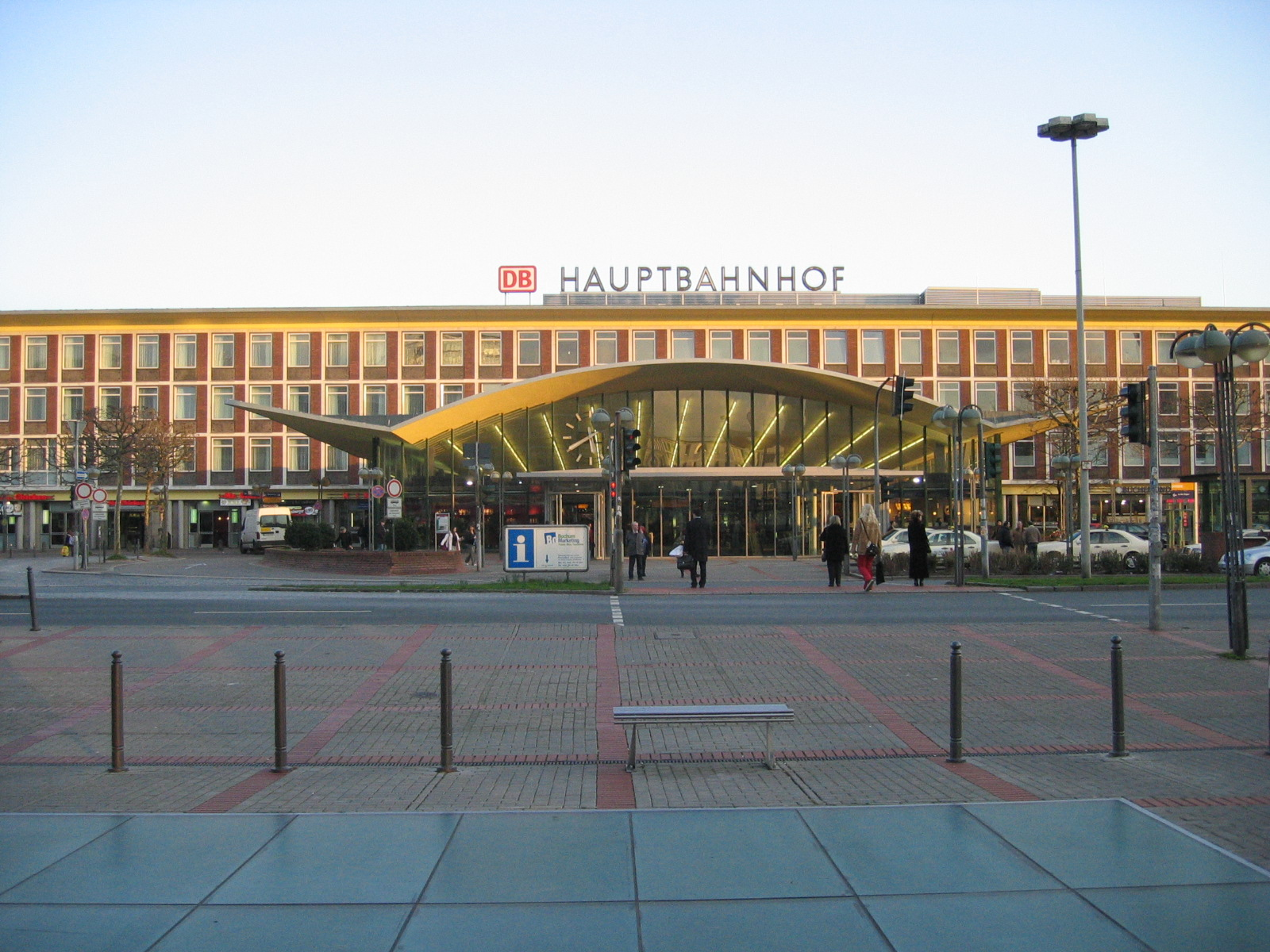
Bochum Hauptbahnhof, north façade

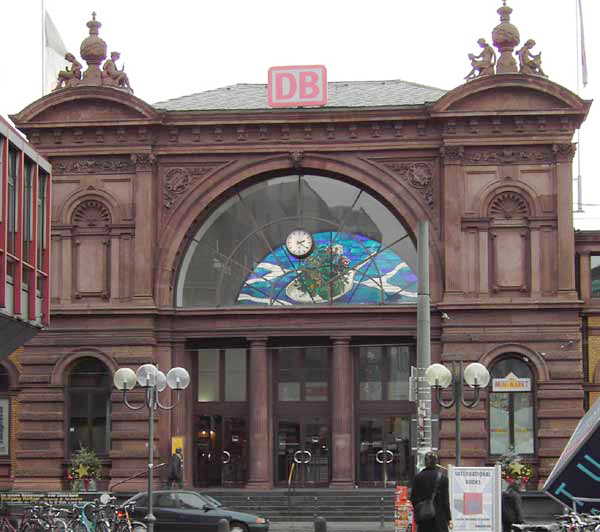
Bonn Hbf

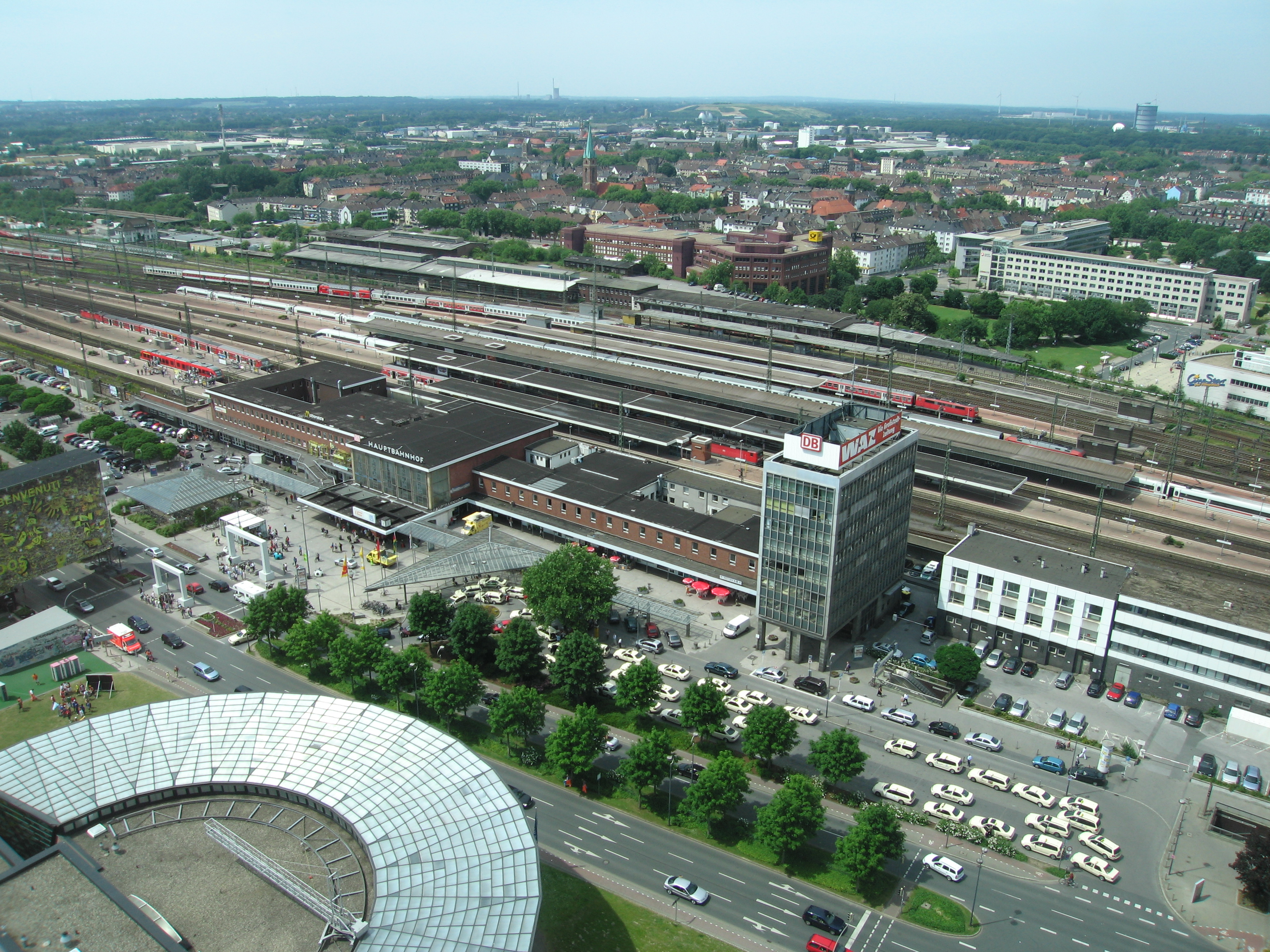
Dortmund Hbf from the RWE tower

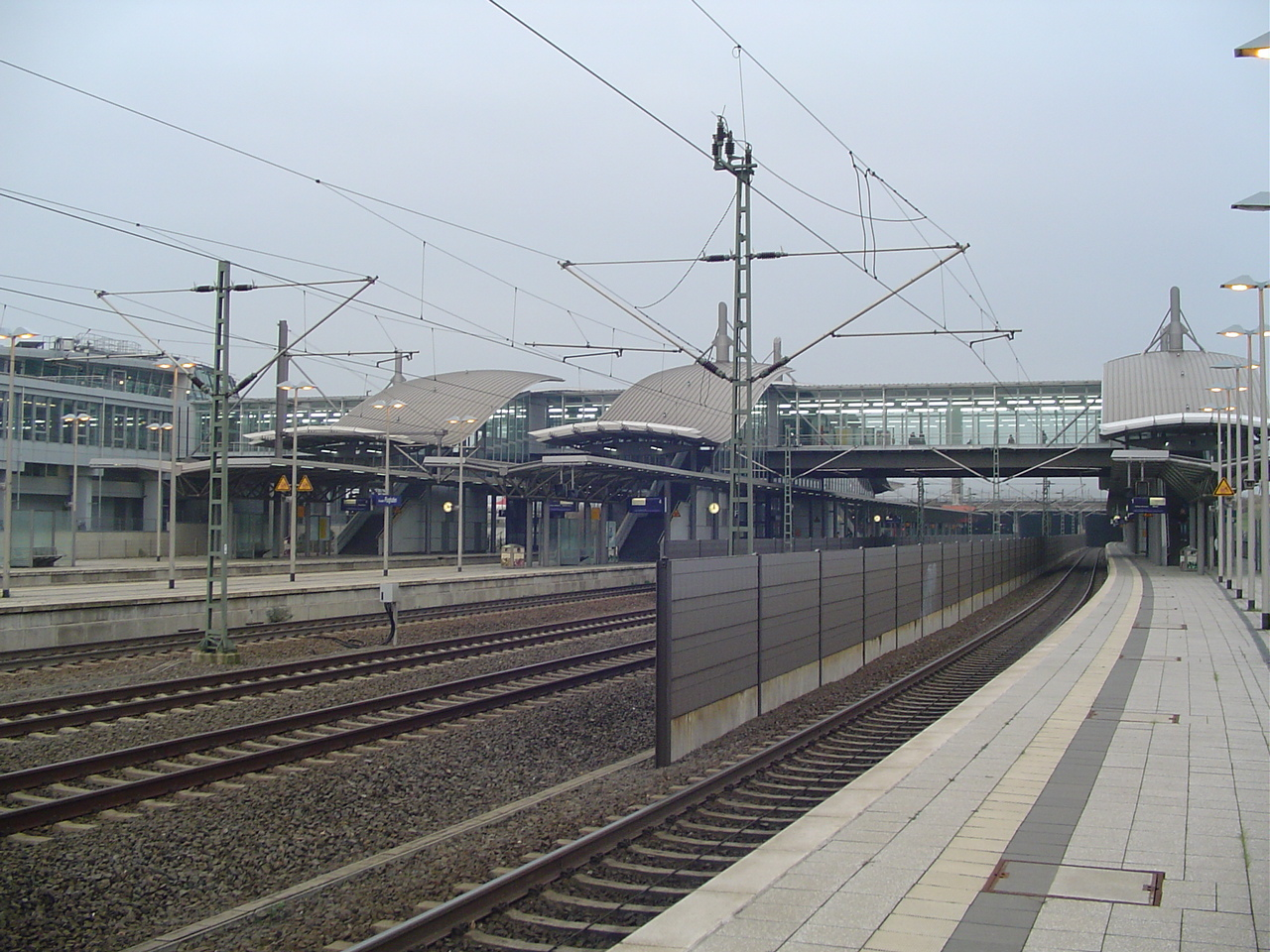
Düsseldorf Airport

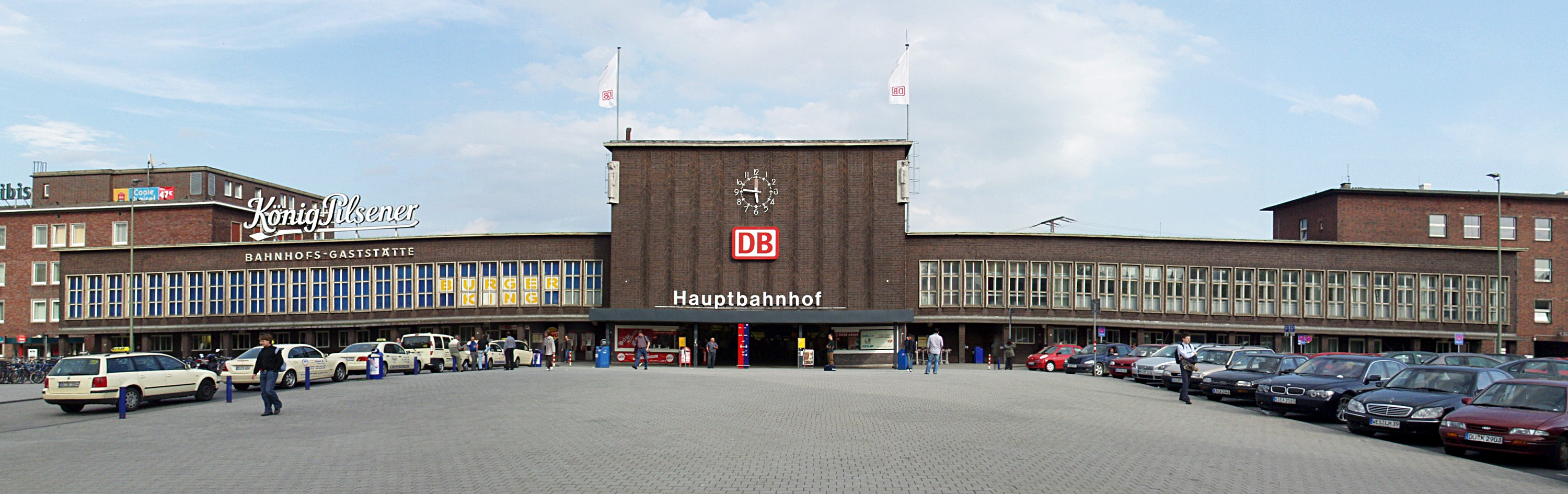
Duisburg Hbf

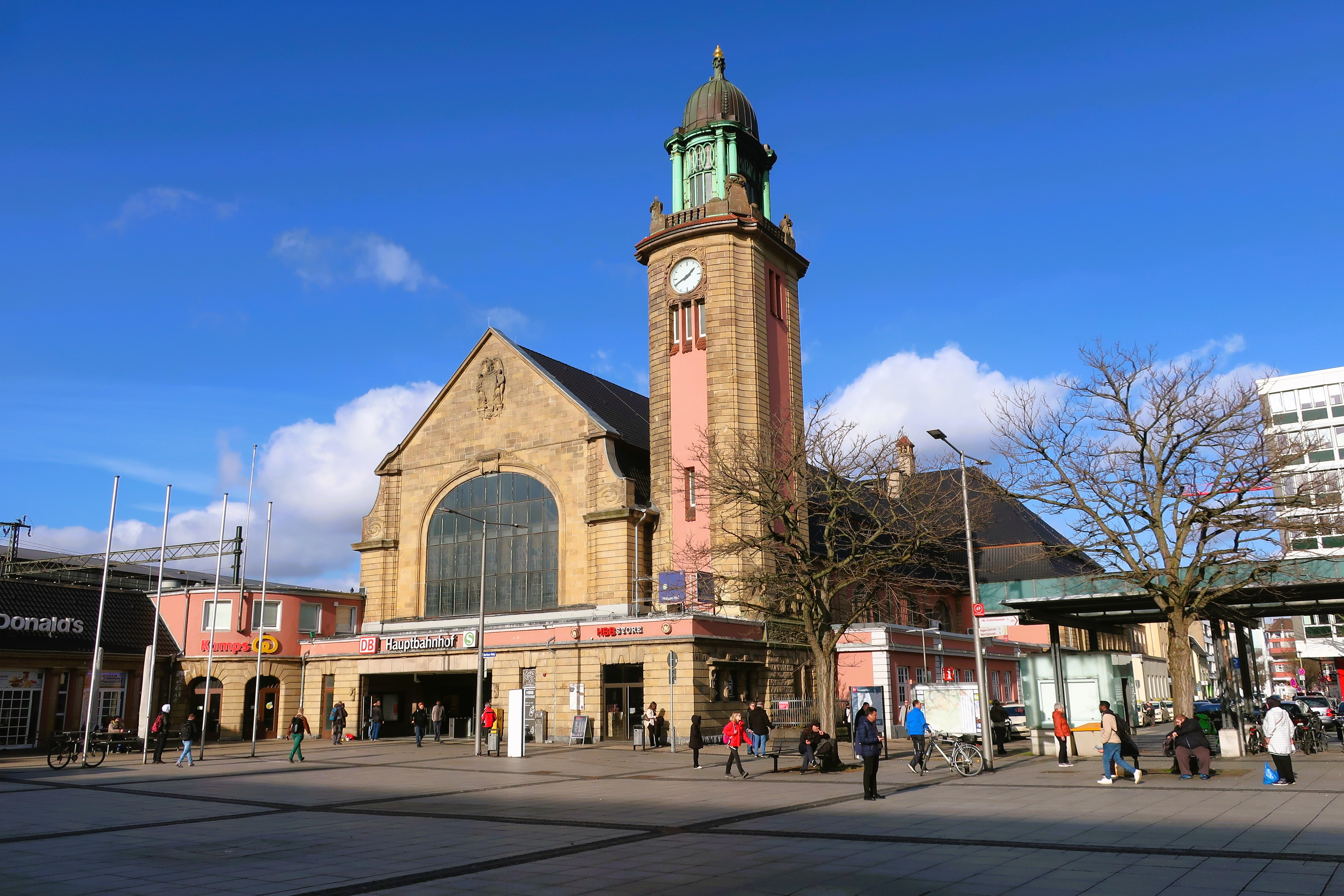
Hagen Hauptbahnhof

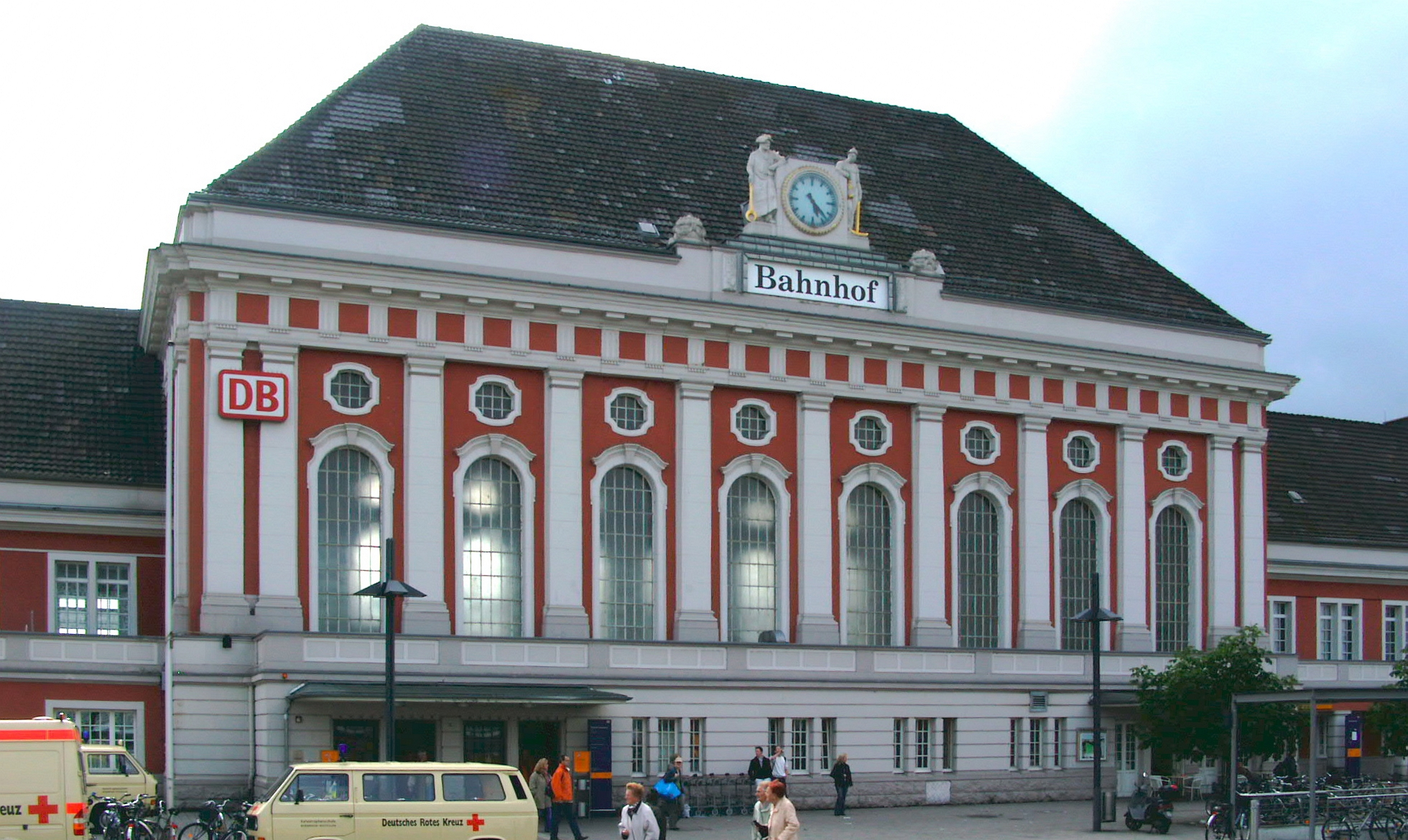
Hamm (Westfalen) station building

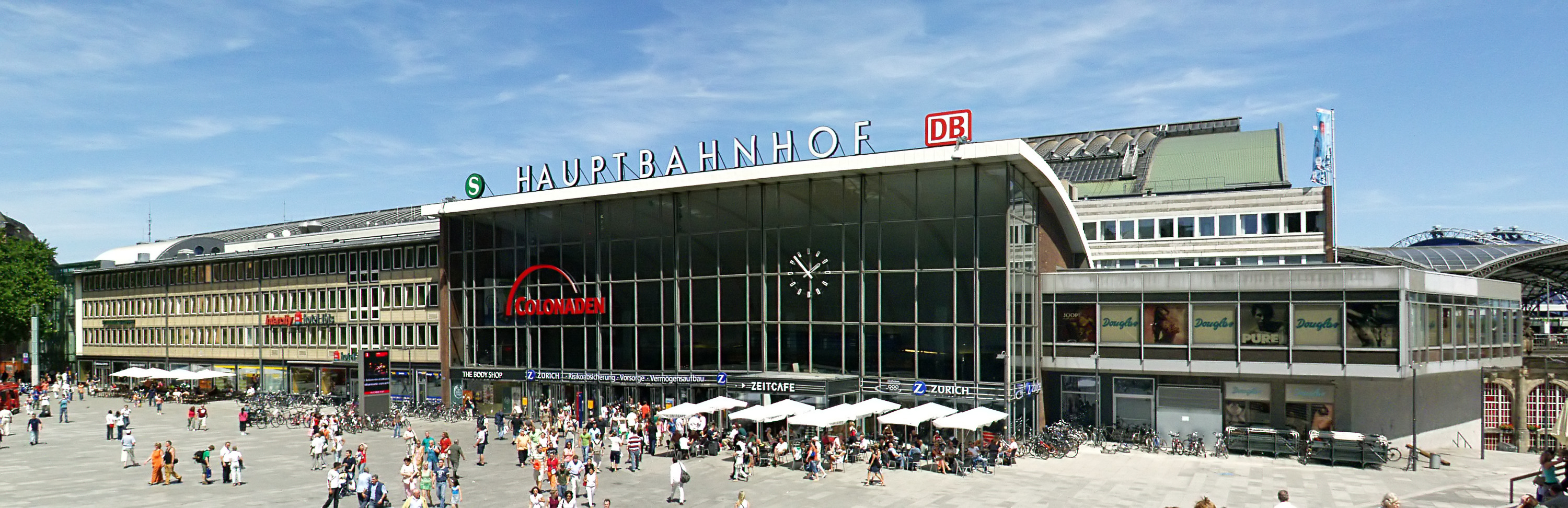
Forecourt and front face of Cologne Hauptbahnhof

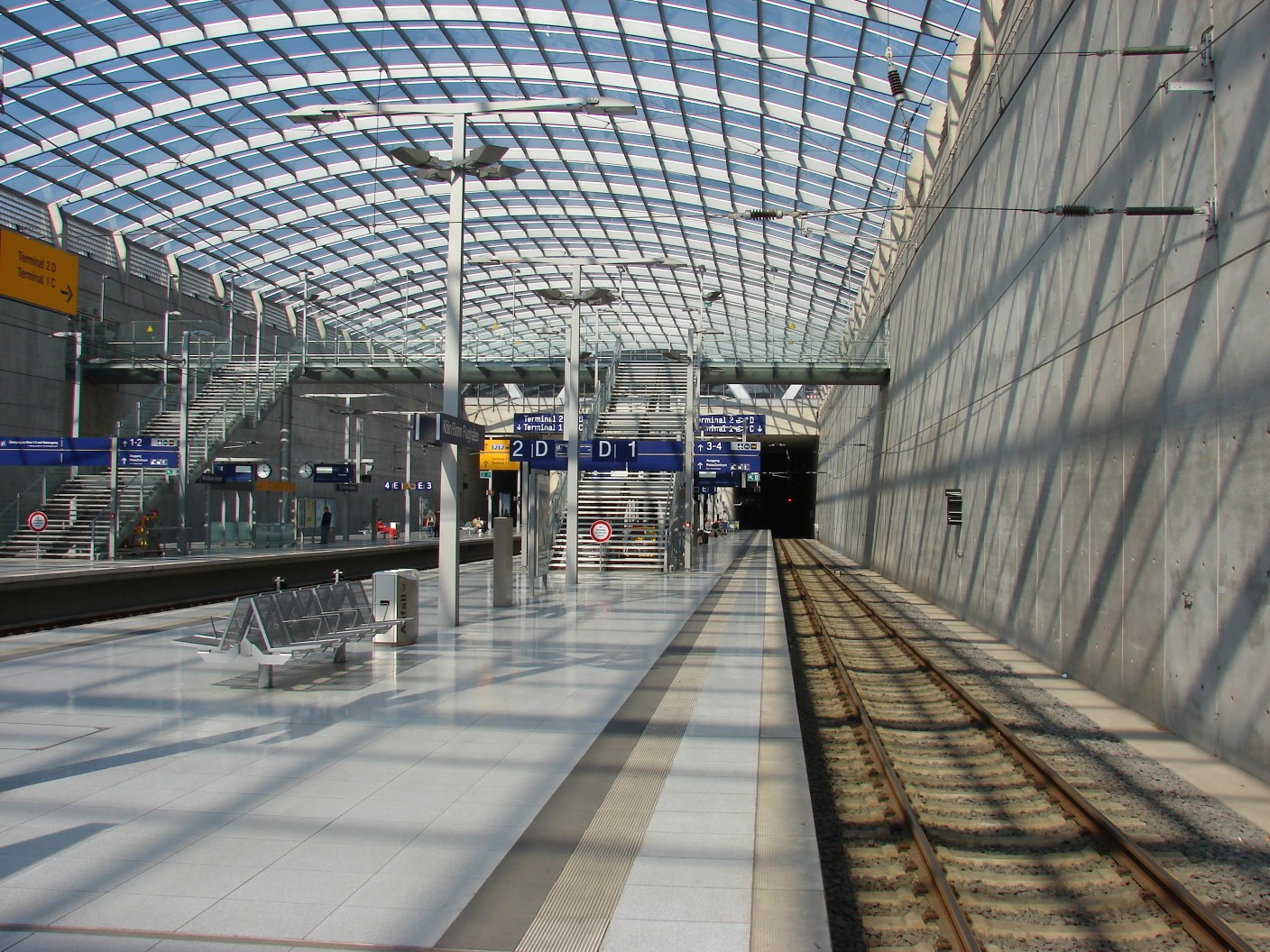
Köln/Bonn Airport

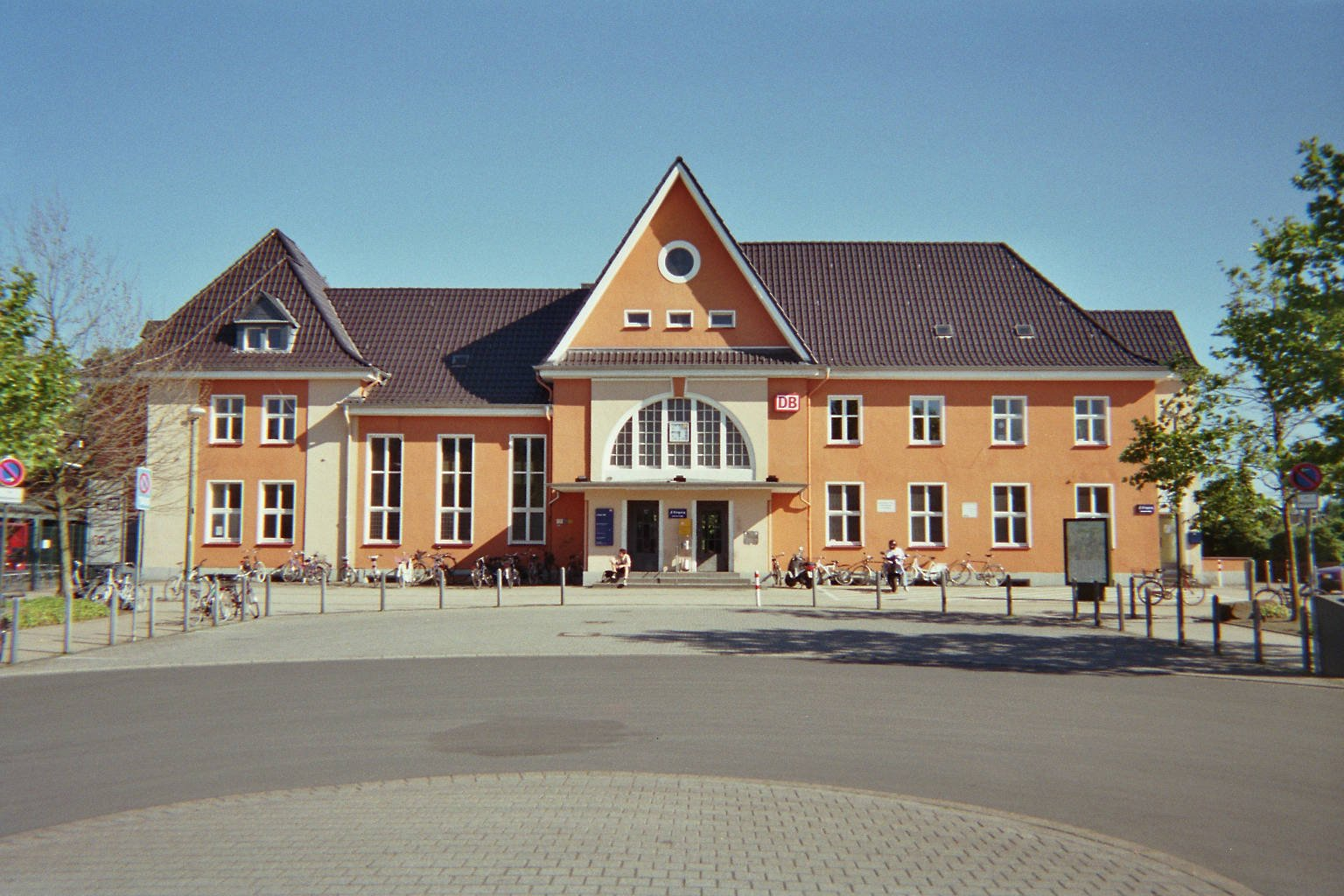
Lünen Hauptbahnhof station building

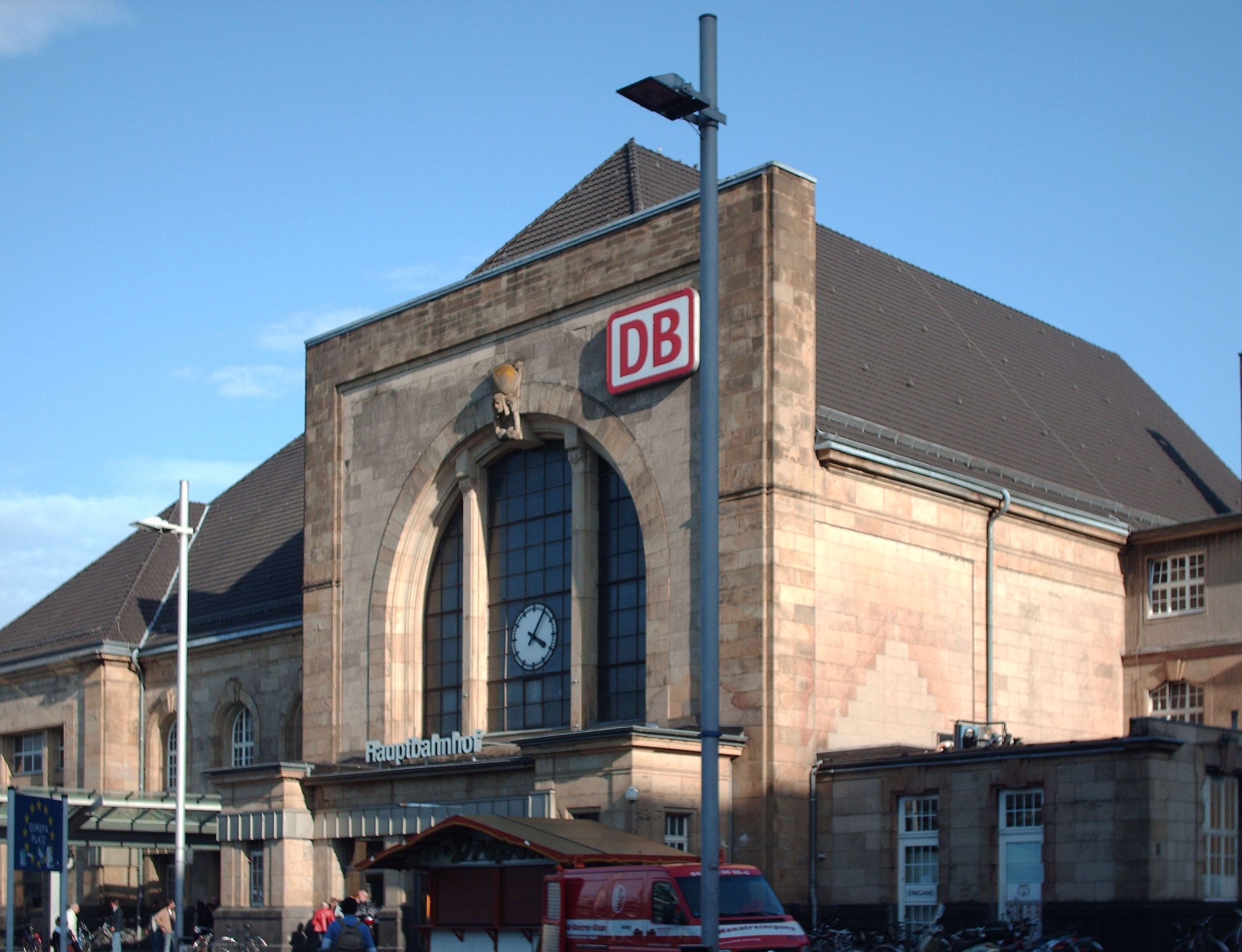
Mönchengladbach Hbf

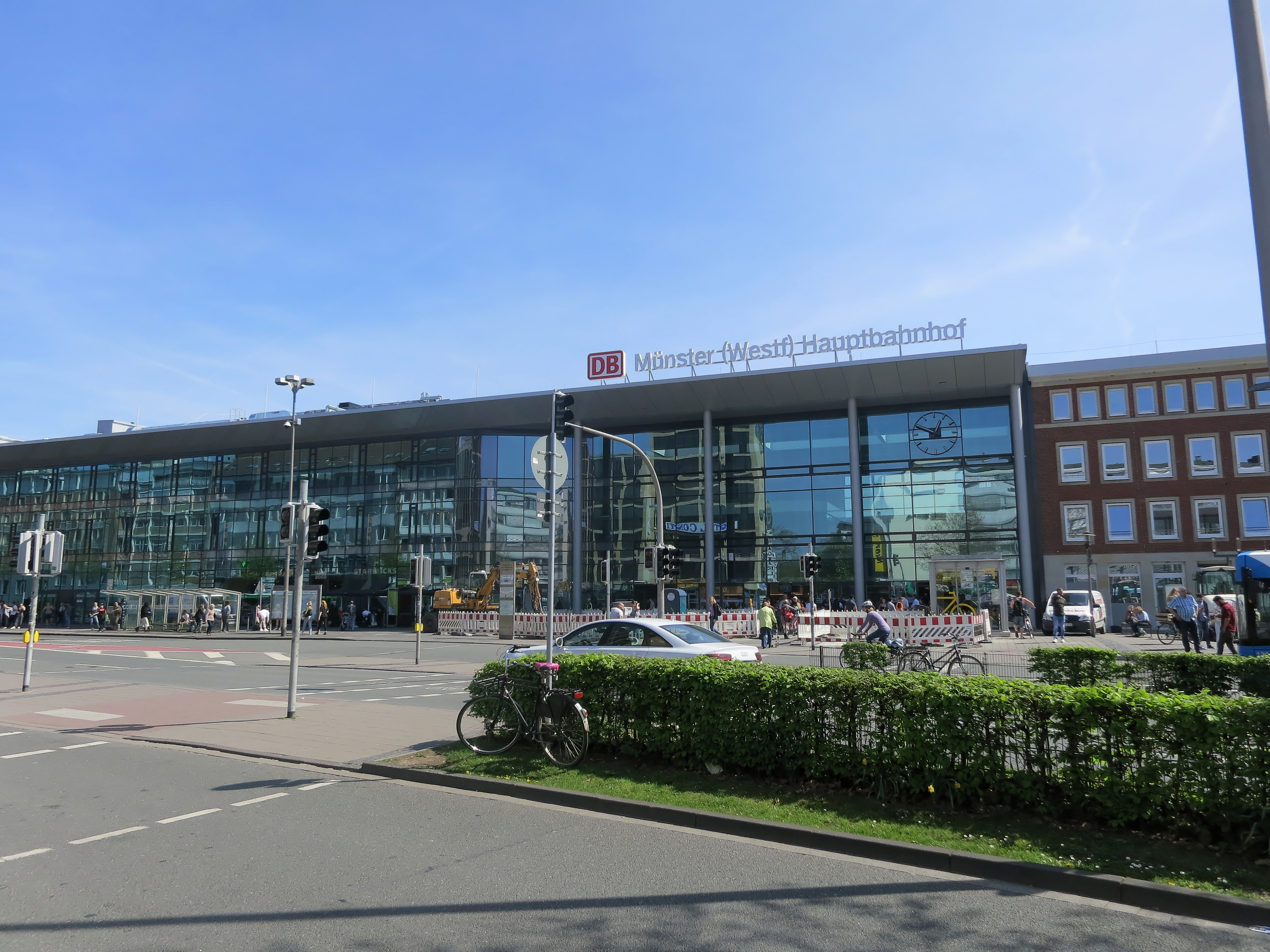
Münster Hbf

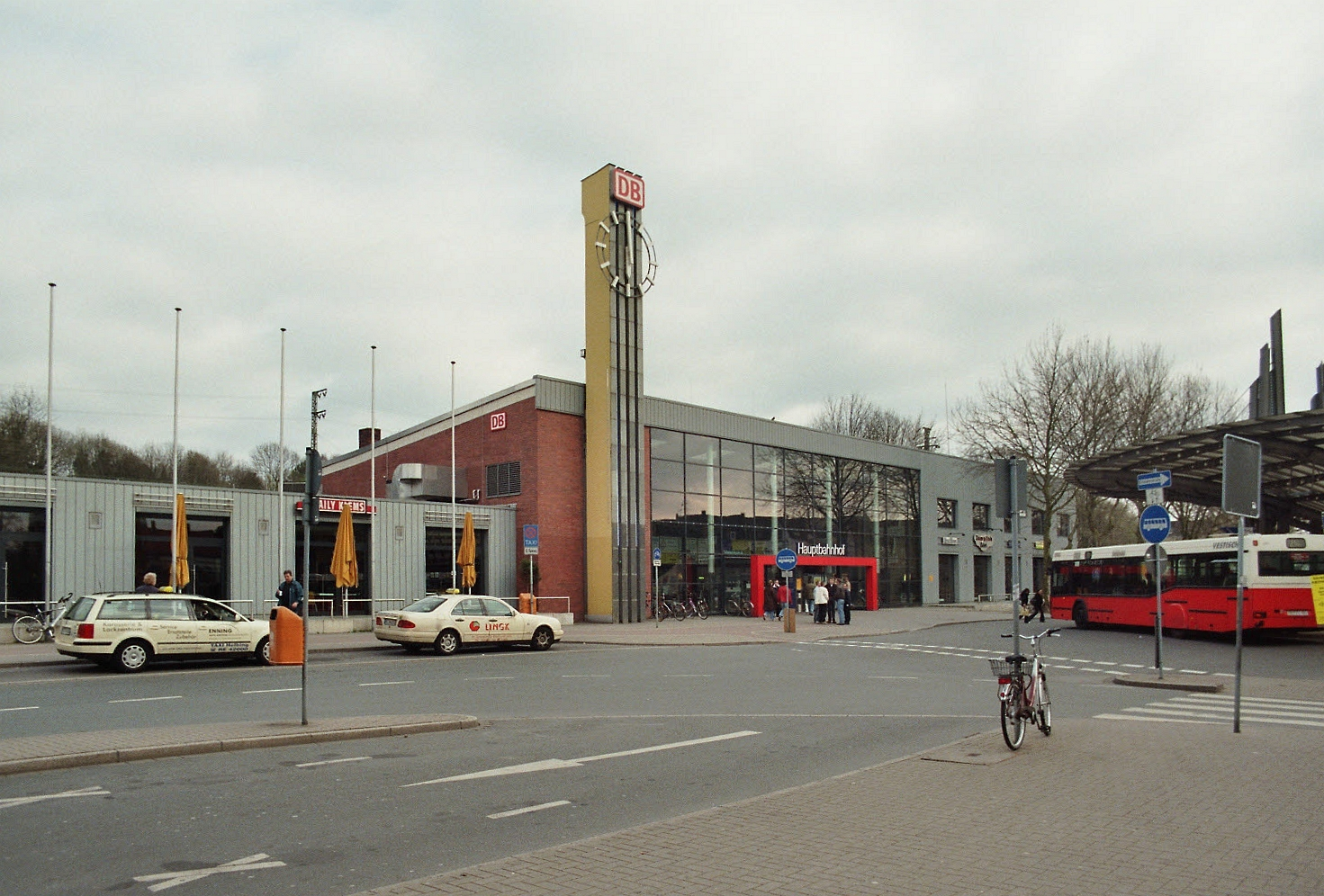
Recklinghausen Hauptbahnhof station building

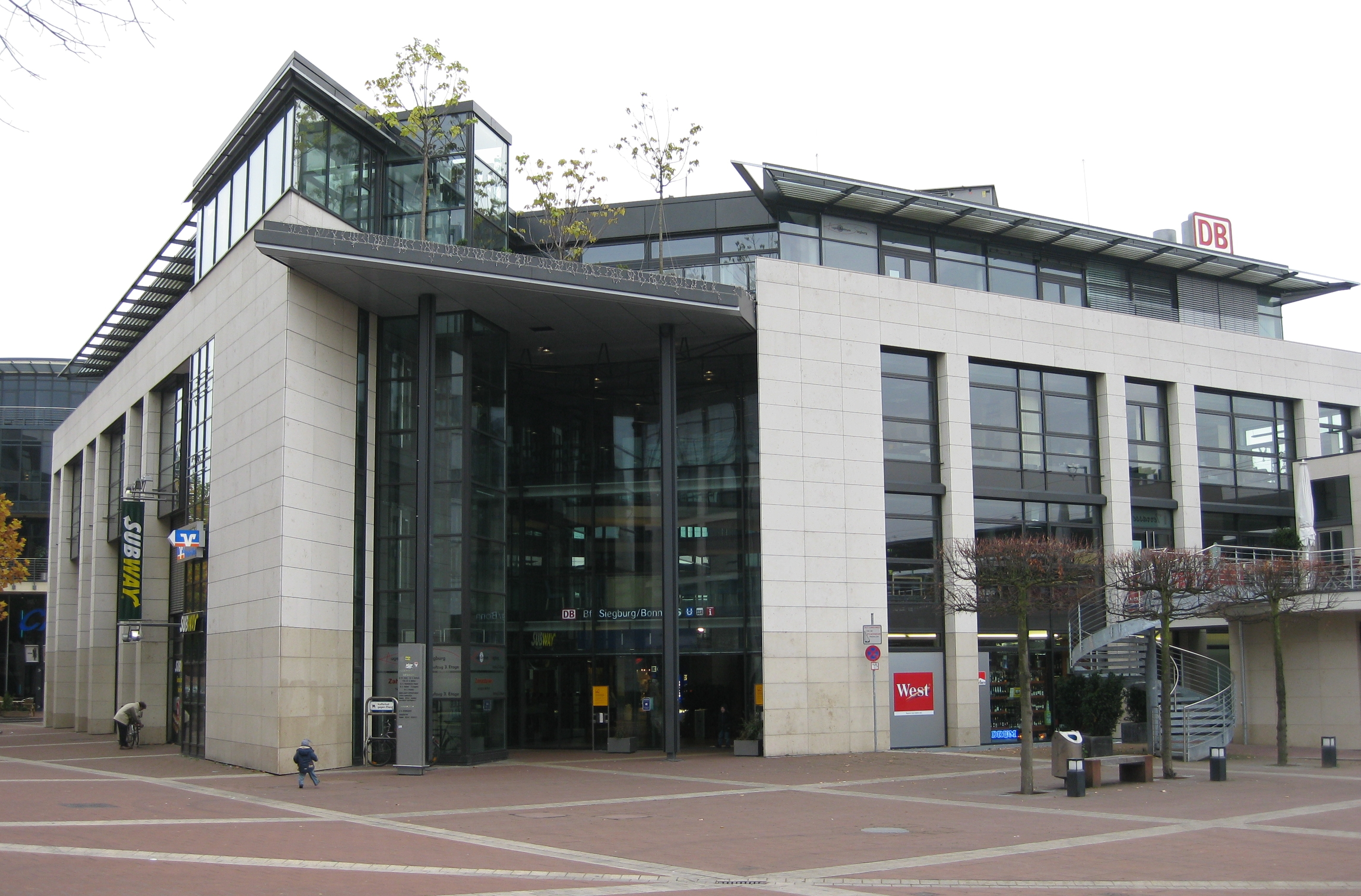
Siegburg/Bonn station building

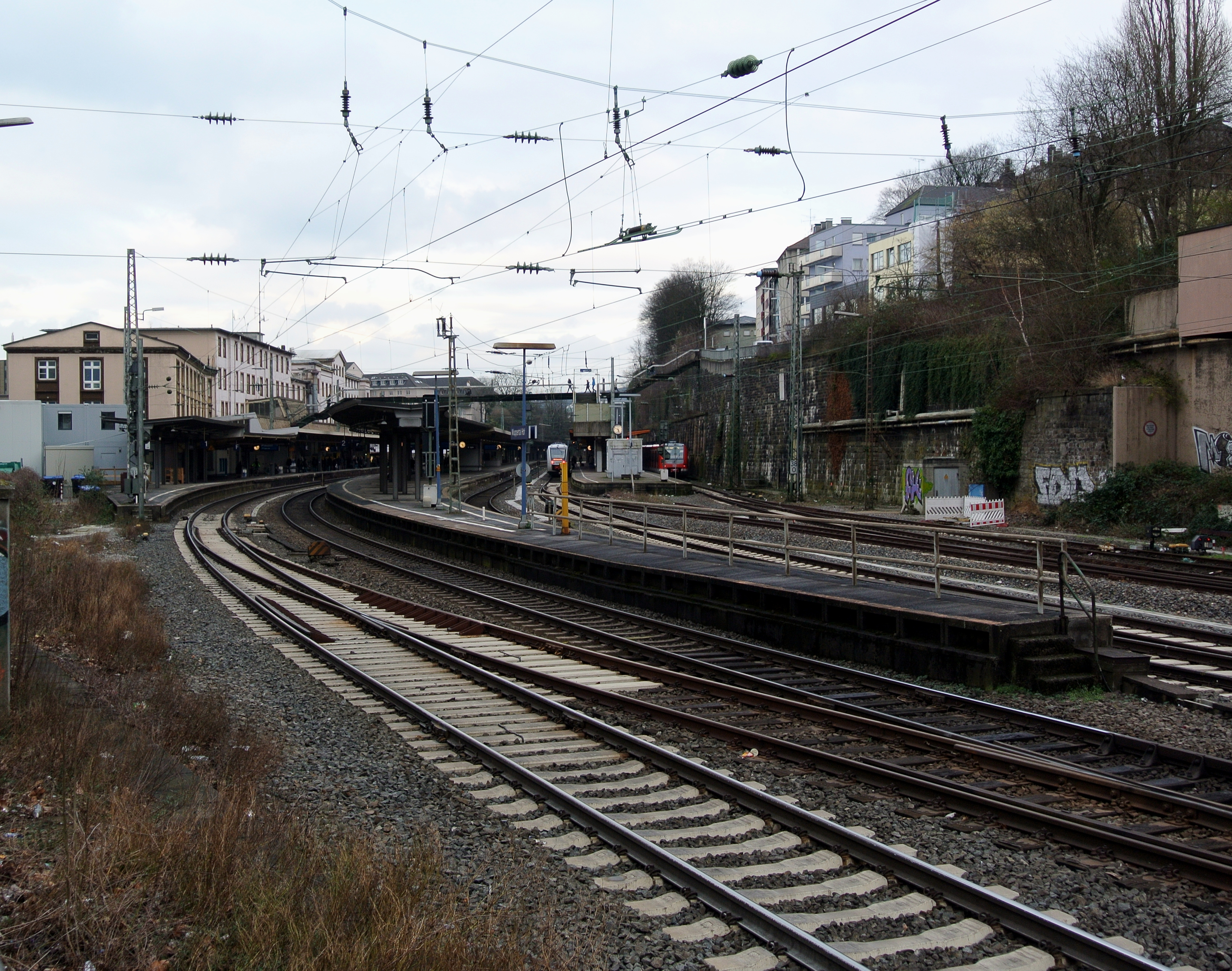
Western end of Wuppertal Hbf, the smallest city station in Germany

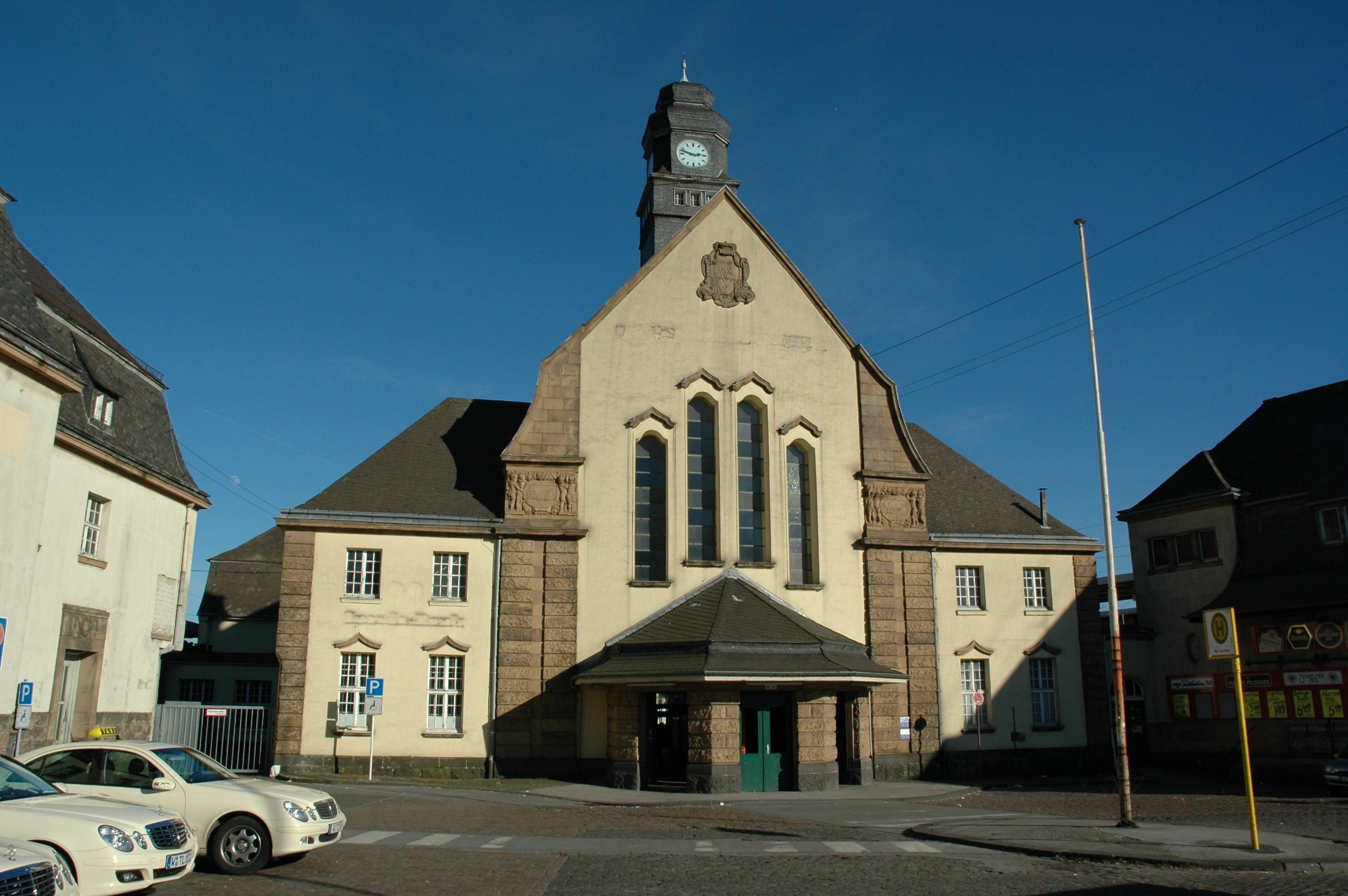
Vohwinkel railway station, Wuppertal

This list of railway stations in North Rhine-Westphalia includes the most important passenger stations operated by the Deutsche Bahn in North Rhine-Westphalia, based on the DB's railway station categories.

Passenger stations not mentioned here are in the lowest categories, 6 or 7.

Station No.	Location	2018 category
0001	Aachen Hbf	2
7205	Aachen Schanz	5
0002	Aachen-Rothe Erde	4
0003	Aachen West	5
0022	Ahaus	6
0023	Ahlen (Westf)	4
0051	Aldekerk	6
6828	Alfter-Witterschlick	6
0080	Altena (Westf)	4
0085	Altenbeken	3
0062	Alpen	7
0147	Angermund	5
0160	Anrath	5
0177	Arnsberg (Westf)	4
0204	Au (Sieg)	3
0285	Bad Honnef (Rhein)	5
0315	Bad Oeynhausen	3
0316	Bad Oeynhausen Süd	6
0334	Bad Sassendorf	6
0447	Bedburg (Erft)	6
0448	Bedburg-Hau	6
0507	Bergheim (Erft)	6
0512	Bergisch Gladbach	5
0591	Bestwig	5
0622	Bielefeld Hbf	2
0643	Billerbeck	6
0684	Blankenberg	6
0714	Blumenkamp	6
0723	Bocholt	6
0724	Bochum Hbf	2
0726	Bochum West	6
0727	Bochum-Dahlhausen	5
0728	Bochum-Ehrenfeld	5
0729	Bochum-Hamme	6
0730	Bochum-Langendreer	4
0731	Bochum-Langendreer West	4
0733	Bockum-Hövel	6
0763	Bönen	5
0767	Bonn Hbf	2
0768	Bonn-Bad Godesberg	4
0769	Bonn-Beuel	4
0770	Bonn-Duisdorf	6
0771	Bonn-Mehlem	4
0772	Bonn-Oberkassel	5
8213	Bonn UN Campus station	5
0779	Borgeln	6
0780	Borgholzhausen	7
0785	Borken	6
5773	Bornheim-Sechtem	4
0800	Bösensell	5
0804	Bottrop Hbf	4
0805	Bottrop-Boy	6
0806?	Bottrop-Vonderort	7
0810	Brachelen	6
0811	Brackwede	4
0814	Brake (nr Bielefeld)	5
0816	Brakel (nr Höxter)	6
8251	Brilon Stadt	6
0888	Brilon Wald	5
0915	Brügge (Westfalen)	7
0917	Brühl	4
0962	Buir	5
0963	Buldern	5
0968	Bünde (Westf)	4
1011	Büttgen	6
1033	Castrop-Rauxel Hbf	3
1062	Coesfeld (Westf)	4
8248	Coesfeld Schulzentrum	6
1135	Dattenfeld	6
1180	Detmold	5
1187	Deuten	6
1202	Dieringhausen	6
1217	Dingden	6
1223	Dinslaken	5
1274	Dormagen	4
1275	Dormagen Chempark	6
1284	Dorsten	4
1289	Dortmund Hbf	1
1298	Dortmund-Aplerbeck	6
1299	Dortmund-Aplerbeck Süd	6
1287	Dortmund-Asseln Mitte	6
1301	Dortmund-Barop	5
1300	Dortmund-Bövinghausen	6
1302	Dortmund-Brackel	5
1303	Dortmund-Derne	6
1304	Dortmund-Dorstfeld	3
1305	Dortmund-Dorstfeld Süd	4
1288	Dortmund-Germania	6
1306	Dortmund-Hörde	4
1307	Dortmund-Huckarde	6
1308	Dortmund-Huckarde Nord	7
1309	Dortmund-Kirchderne	6
1310	Dortmund-Kirchhörde	6
1311	Dortmund-Kley	5
1290	Dortmund Knappschaftskrankenhaus	6
1312	Dortmund-Körne	6
1313	Dortmund-Körne West	6
1314	Dortmund-Kruckel	6
1315	Dortmund-Kurl	6
1316	Dortmund-Löttringhausen	6
1235	Dortmund-Lütgendortmund	6
1317	Dortmund-Lütgendortmund Nord	7
1318	Dortmund-Marten	6
1319	Dortmund-Marten Süd	6
1320	Dortmund-Mengede	5
1291	Dortmund-Möllerbrücke	6
1321	Dortmund-Nette/Östrich	5
1322	Dortmund-Oespel	4
1323	Dortmund-Rahm	6
1324	Dortmund-Scharnhorst	5
1325	Dortmund-Sölde	6
0396	Dortmund-Somborn	6
1292	Dortmund-Stadthaus	5
1294	Dortmund-Tierpark	6
1295	Dortmund-Universität	4
1296	Dortmund-West	6
1326	Dortmund-Westerfilde	6
1297	Dortmund Signal-Iduna-Park	4
1327	Dortmund-Wickede	6
1328	Dortmund-Wickede West	6
1329	Dortmund-Wischlingen	6
1341	Drensteinfurt	5
1371	Duckterath	5
1374	Duisburg Hbf	1
1375	Duisburg Schlenk	5
1376	Duisburg-Bissingheim	7
1377	Duisburg-Buchholz	4
1378	Duisburg-Entenfang	6
1379	Duisburg-Grossenbaum	4
1380	Duisburg-Hochfeld Süd	5
1381	Duisburg-Meiderich Ost	6
1382	Duisburg-Meiderich Süd	4
1383	Duisburg-Obermeiderich	6
1384	Duisburg-Rahm	5
1386	Duisburg-Ruhrort	6
1387	Duisburg-Wedau	6
1390	Dülmen	4
1392	Düren	3
	Düsseldorf Flughafen Terminal	4
1400	Düsseldorf Flughafen	2
1401	Düsseldorf Hbf	1
1421	Düsseldorf Völklinger Strasse	5
1402	Düsseldorf Volksgarten	5
1403	Düsseldorf Wehrhahn	4
1404	Düsseldorf Zoo	4
1399	Düsseldorf-Benrath	3
1405	Düsseldorf-Bilk	4
1406	Düsseldorf-Derendorf	4
1407	Düsseldorf-Eller	5
1408	Düsseldorf-Eller Mitte	5
1409	Düsseldorf-Eller Süd	5
1410	Düsseldorf-Flingern	5
1411	Düsseldorf-Friedrichstadt	5
1412	Düsseldorf-Garath	5
1413	Düsseldorf-Gerresheim	5
1414	Düsseldorf-Hamm	5
1415	Düsseldorf-Hellerhof	5
1416	Düsseldorf-Oberbilk	5
1417	Düsseldorf-Rath	5
1418	Düsseldorf-Rath Mitte	5
1419	Düsseldorf-Reisholz	4
1420	Düsseldorf-Unterrath	4
1515	Eilendorf	6
1537	Eiserfeld (Sieg)	6
1541	Eitorf	5
1585	Emmerich	5
1588	Empel-Rees	5
1590	Emsdetten	4
1597	Engelskirchen	5
1603	Ennepetal	4
1610	Epe (Westf)	6
1631	Erftstadt	4
1643	Erkelenz	4
1646	Erkrath	5
	Erkrath Nord	Not DB
1659	Erndtebrück	5
1680	Eschweiler Hbf	4
1690	Essen Hbf	1
1691	Essen Stadtwald	4
1692	Essen Süd	5
1693	Essen West	4
1694	Essen-Altenessen	5
1695	Essen-Bergeborbeck	6
1696	Essen-Borbeck	5
1697	Essen-Borbeck Süd	5
1698	Essen-Dellwig	6
1699	Essen-Dellwig Ost	6
1700	Essen-Eiberg	5
1701	Essen-Frohnhausen	4
1702	Essen-Gerschede	5
1703	Essen-Holthausen	5
1704	Essen-Horst	6
1705	Essen-Hügel	5
1707	Essen-Kray Nord	6
1708	Essen-Kray Sud	6
1709	Essen-Kupferdreh	6
1710	Essen-Steele	4
1711	Essen-Steele Ost	4
1712	Essen-Überruhr	6
1713	Essen-Werden	5
1706	Essen-Zollverein Nord	6
1734	Euskirchen	3
3446	Euskirchen-Kuchenheim	6
1773	Feldhausen	6
1793	Finnentrop	4
1836	Forsthaus	6
2306	Frechen-Königsdorf	5
1901	Freienohl	5
1943	Friedrichsfeld (Niederrhein)	5
1969	Fröndenberg	3
2037	Geilenkirchen	5
2050	Geldern	5
2052	Gelsenkirchen Hbf	2
2053	Gelsenkirchen Zoo	6
2054	Gelsenkirchen-Buer Nord	6
2055	Gelsenkirchen-Buer Süd	7
2056	Gelsenkirchen-Hassel	6
2057	Gelsenkirchen-Rotthausen	6
2109	Geseke	5
2113	Gevelsberg Hbf	6
2114	Gevelsberg West	6
2115	Gevelsberg-Kipp	6
2116	Gevelsberg-Knapp	6
2132	Gladbeck Ost	6
2133	Gladbeck West	4
2134	Gladbeck-Zweckel	6
2159	Goch	6
2262	Greven	3
2263	Grevenbroich	4
2288	Gronau (Westf)	5
2381	Gruiten	4
2410	Gummersbach	6
2438	Gütersloh Hbf	3
2442	Haan	5
2457	Hagen Hbf	2
2460	Hagen-Heubing	6
2463	Hagen-Vorhalle	6
2464	Hagen-Wehringhausen	6
2465	Hagen-Westerbauer	6
2495	Haldern (Rheinland)	6
2500	Halle (Westf)	6
7772	Halle Gerry-Weber-Stadion	7
2510	Haltern am See	4
2528	Hamm (Westf)	2
2536	Hamminkeln	6
2592	Hattingen (Ruhr)	5
2593	Hattingen (Ruhr) Mitte	6
2621	Heessen	6
	Heinsberg (Rheinland)	
2681	Hemmerde	6
2688	Hennef (Sieg)	4
2166	Hennef im Siegbogen	6
2705	Herchen	5
2708	Herford	2
2722	Herne	3
2723	Herne-Börnig	6
2725	Herrath	6
2736	Hervest-Dorsten	6
2744	Herzogenrath	3
2747	Hesseln	7
5817	Hiddenhausen-Schweicheln	6
2763	Hilden	4
2764	Hilden Süd	5
2798	Hochdahl	5
2799	Hochdahl-Millrath	5
2804	Hochneukirch	6
2824	Hoffnungsthal	6
2851	Hohenlimburg	5
2887	Holzheim (nr Neuss)	6
2890	Holzwickede	5
2895	Honrath	6
2912	Horn-Bad Meinberg	6
2919	Horrem	3
2923	Hörstel	5
2926	Hösel	5
2930	Höxter Rathaus	6
0235	Hückelhoven-Baal	4
3089	Hürth-Kalscheuren	4
2961	Ibbenbüren	4
3493	Ibbenbüren-Laggenbeck	5
3006	Iserlohn	6
3065	Jüchen	6
	Kaarst IKEA	Not DB
	Kaarst Mitte/Holzbüttgen	Not DB
	Kaarster Bahnhof	Not DB
	Kaarster See	Not DB
3087	Kaldenkirchen	5
3088	Kall	4
3095	Kamen	4
3096	Kamen-Methler	5
3102	Kapellen-Wevelinghoven	6
3154	Kempen (Niederrhein)	6
3166	Kettwig	4
3167	Kettwig Stausee	6
3169	Kevelaer	5
3175	Kierberg	5
3201	Kirchlengern	5
3247	Kleinenbroich	5
3265	Kleve	6
3309	Kohlscheid	6
2070	Köln Airport-Businesspark	6
5343	Köln Frankfurter Straße	4
3319	Köln Geldernstraße/Parkgürtel	4
3331	Köln Hansaring	4
3320	Köln Hbf	1
3329	Köln Messe/Deutz	1
2090	Köln Steinstraße	4
3321	Köln Süd	4
3322	Köln Trimbornstraße	4
3323	Köln Volkhovener Weg	5
3324	Köln West	4
4762	Köln/Bonn Flughafen	3
7651	Köln-Blumenberg	5
3325	Köln-Buchforst	5
3326	Köln-Chorweiler	4
3327	Köln-Chorweiler Nord	4
3328	Köln-Dellbrück	4
3330	Köln-Ehrenfeld	3
3332	Köln-Holweide	5
3335	Köln-Longerich	4
3336	Köln-Mülheim	3
5335	Köln-Müngersdorf Technologiepark	5
3337	Köln-Nippes	5
3338	Köln-Stammheim	5
8131	Köln-Weiden West	5
3339	Köln-Worringen	5
3360	Königswinter	4
3380	Korschenbroich	5
3403	Krefeld Hbf	3
2837	Krefeld-Hohenbudberg Chempark	6
3404	Krefeld-Linn	5
3405	Krefeld-Oppum	4
3406	Krefeld-Uerdingen	5
3420	Kreuztal	4
3463	Künsebeck	6
3491	Lage (Lippe)	4
3535	Langenfeld (Rheinland)	4
3536	Langenfeld-Berghausen	5
3557	Langerwehe	5
3611	Legden	7
3621	Leichlingen	5
3662	Lengerich (Westf)	5
3670	Letmathe	5
3671	Letmathe-Dechenhöhle	7
3673	Lette (Kr Coesfeld)	7
0437	Leverkusen Chempark	5
3694	Leverkusen-Manfort	5
3691	Leverkusen Mitte	4
3692	Leverkusen-Küppersteg	5
3693	Leverkusen-Rheindorf	5
3734	Lindern	4
3746	Lippstadt	4
3768	Löhne (Westf)	4
3795	Lövenich	5
3828	Lüdenscheid	6
3856	Lünen Hbf	4
3857	Lünern	6
3942	Marbeck-Heiden	6
3983	Marl Hamm	6
3981	Marl Mitte	6
3984	Marl-Sinsen	5
3997	Massen	6
4012	Mechernich	5
4016	Meckenheim (Cologne district)	6
7769	Meckenheim Industriepark	5
3385	Meckenheim Kottenforst	6
4023	Meerbusch-Osterath	5
4026	Mehrhoog	6
4032	Meinerzhagen	6
	Mettmann Zentrum	Not DB
4052	Menden (Rheinl)	5
4053	Menden (Sauerland)	6
4070	Merten	6
5485	Merzenich	5
4076	Meschede	4
4081	Metelen Land	6
	Mettmann Stadtwald	Not DB
4106	Millingen	6
4107	Millingen (bei Rees)	6
4120	Minden (Westf)	3
4148	Moers	5
4162	Mönchengladbach Hbf	2
4164	Mönchengladbach-Genhausen	7
4163	Mönchengladbach-Lürrip	6
4219	Mülheim (Ruhr) Hbf	3
4220	Mülheim (Ruhr) West	5
4221	Mülheim (Ruhr)-Styrum	3
4280	Münster (Westf) Hbf	2
7655	Münster-Zentrum Nord	5
39	Münster-Albachten	6
135	Münster-Amelsbüren	6
4546	Münster-Häger	6
2771	Münster-Hiltrup	4
8247	Münster-Roxel	7
4281	Münster-Sarmsheim	6
5928	Münster-Sprakel	5
	Neanderthal	Not DB
4329	Neheim-Hüsten	5
4361	Neubeckum	4
7656	Neuss Allerheiligen	6
4439	Neuss Am Kaiser	5
4440	Neuss Hbf	2
4441	Neuss Rheinparkcenter	5
4442	Neuss Süd	6
4488	Niederdollendorf	5
4553	Nieukerk	6
4554	Nievenheim	6
4583	Norf	5
0167	Nottuln-Appelhülsen	4
4648	Oberhausen Hbf	2
4649	Oberhausen-Holten	5
4650	Oberhausen-Osterfeld Süd	6
4651	Oberhausen-Sterkrade	5
4722	Ochtrup	5
4723	Odendorf	6
4731	Oelde	4
4735	Oerlinghausen	6
4739	Oeventrop	6
4768	Olsberg	5
4770	Opladen	3
4820	Ottbergen	6
4841	Overath	5
4846	Paderborn Hbf	2
4965	Plettenberg	4
4998	Porta Westfalica	4
4999	Porz (Rhein)	4
5002	Porz-Wahn	4
5017	Praest	6
5032	Preussen	5
5056	Pulheim	5
5065	Quadrath-Ichendorf	6
5070	Quelle	6
4914	Quelle-Kupferheide	7
5099	Rahden (Kreis Minden-Lübbecke)	6
5136	Ratingen Ost	5
5159	Reckenfeld	5
5160	Recklinghausen Hbf	3
5161	Recklinghausen Süd	5
5217	Remscheid Hbf	5
5218	Remscheid-Güldenwerth	6
5219	Remscheid-Lennep	5
5220	Remscheid-Lüttringhausen	6
5246	Rhade	6
5247	Rheda-Wiedenbrück	4
5248	Rheinbach	6
5249	Rheinberg (Rheinl)	6
5251	Rheine	2
4080	Rheine-Mesum	6
5253	Rheinhausen	4
5254	Rheinhausen Ost	5
5260	Rheydt Hbf	4
5261	Rheydt-Odenkirchen	6
5263	Rhöndorf	5
5287	Rinkerode	6
5326	Roisdorf	5
5334	Rommerskirchen	5
5341	Rosbach (Sieg)	6
2879	Rosendahl-Holtwick	7
5353	Rösrath	5
5354	Rösrath-Stümpen	6
5430	Rumeln	5
5484	Salzkotten	5
5545	Scharmede	6
5559	Scherfede	6
5580	Schladern	5
5749	Schwelm	3
5750	Schwelm West	6
5763	Schwerte (Ruhr)	4
5840	Siegburg/Bonn	3
5842	Siegen	3
5844	Siegen-Weidenau	4
5864	Sindorf	6
5876	Soest	3
5882	Solingen Hbf	2
5881	Solingen Vogelpark	5
5778	Solingen-Grünewald	5
5414	Solingen-Mitte	6
5883	Solingen-Schaberg	6
5924	Spich	5
0781	Steinfurt-Borghorst	6
0997	Steinfurt-Burgsteinfurt	6
5996	Steinhagen	6
3030	Steinhagen Bielefelder Straße	6
6037	Stolberg (Rheinl) Hbf	4
6040	Stommeln	5
6131	Sythen	5
6273	Troisdorf	3
6274	Trompet	5
6297	Übach-Palenberg	5
6335	Unna	3
6337	Unna-Königsborn	6
6336	Unna-West	6
3529	Velbert-Langenberg	5
4469	Velbert-Neviges	5
4550	Velbert-Nierenhof	6
5560	Velbert-Rosenhügel	6
6415	Viersen	3
6428	Vlotho	6
6429	Voerde (Niederrhein)	5
6533	Wanne-Eickel Hbf	3
6537	Warburg	4
6539	Warendorf	6
6568	Wattenscheid	4
6569	Wattenscheid-Höntrop	5
6579	Weeze	5
6614	Weilerswist	6
6664	Welver	5
6683	Werdohl	5
6686	Werl	4
6689	Werne (a d Lippe)	5
6701	Wesel	3
6702	Wesel-Feldmark	6
6706	Westbarthausen	7
6724	Westönnen	6
6728	Wetter (Ruhr)	5
6731	Wickede (Ruhr)	5
6733	Wickrath	6
6822	Witten Hbf	3
6823	Witten-Annen Nord	6
6902	Wulfen (Westf)	6
5004	Wülfrath-Aprath	5
6914	Wuppertal Hbf	2
6915	Wuppertal Zoologischer Garten	4
6916	Wuppertal-Barmen	4
6923	Wuppertal-Langerfeld	6
6928	Wuppertal-Oberbarmen	3
6932	Wuppertal-Ronsdorf	5
6934	Wuppertal-Sonnborn	4
6935	Wuppertal-Steinbeck	5
6936	Wuppertal-Unterbarmen	4
6937	Wuppertal-Vohwinkel	3
6966	Xanten	6
7021	Zieverich	5

== See also ==
- German railway station categories
- List of scheduled railway routes in Germany
- Railway station types in Germany
