= Düsseldorf-Angermund station =

Railway station in Düsseldorf, Germany

Angermund
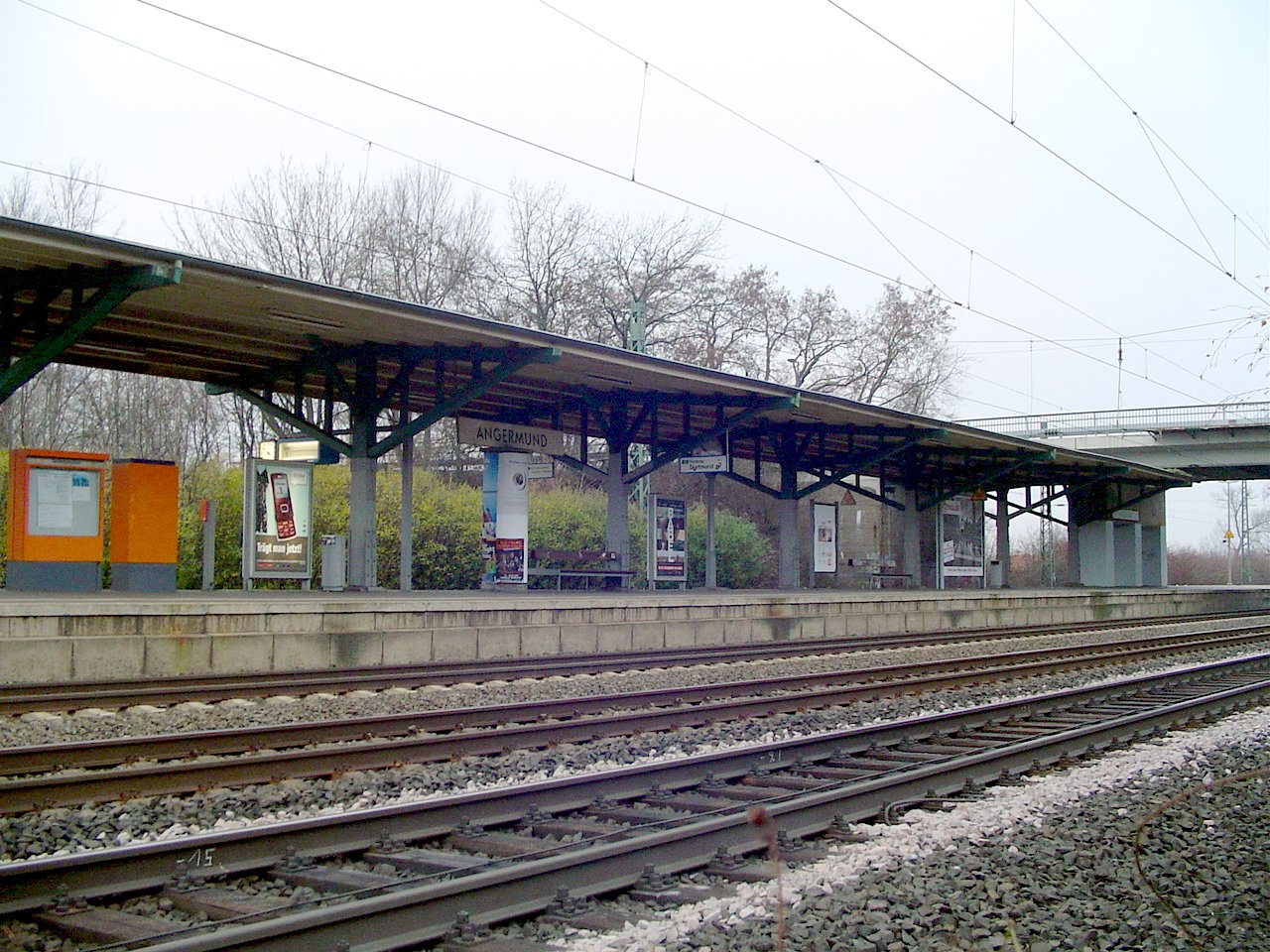

General information
- Location: An den Linden 18, Angermund, NRW; Germany
- Coordinates: 51°19′48″N 6°46′54″E
- Line: Cologne–Duisburg railway
- Platforms: 2
- Train operators: DB Regio NRW

Construction
- Accessible: No

Other information
- Station code: 147
- DS100 code: KANM
- IBNR: 8000579
- Category: 5
- Fare zone: VRR: 434; VRS: 1430 (VRR transitional zone)
- Website: www.bahnhof.de

History
- Opened: 1880/97

Services
Preceding station	Rhine-Ruhr S-Bahn	Following station
Düsseldorf Flughafen towards Solingen Hbf	S1	Duisburg-Rahm towards Dortmund Hbf
Location

Düsseldorf-Angermund station is a station on the Cologne–Duisburg railway in the Düsseldorf district of Angermund in the German state of North Rhine Westphalia. It is served by line S1 of the Rhine-Ruhr S-Bahn.

== Location ==
The station is situated in the village at the intersection of the Cologne–Duisburg railway, which runs north–south along Angermunder Straße (L 139). This is the main street of the village and crosses the rail tracks at right angles on a bridge above the station. Bahnhofstraße (station street) also runs from the east about 100 metres further south. On the western side of the line, its alignment is continued by the street An den Linden (beside the linden trees).

== Infrastructure ==
The station has an island platform which is arranged centrally below the bridge and is located on the two western tracks of the four-track line. Access is at the southern end of the platform by means of an underpass that connects to both Bahnhofstraße and An den Linden. The southern half of the platform is covered.

There is a bus stop on Bahnhofstraße and on the west side there is a parking lot with about 70 parking spaces.

== Transport services ==
The station is served by Rhine-Ruhr S-Bahn line S1 (Dortmund–Solingen) every 30 minutes during the day on weekdays between Essen and Düsseldorf. It is also connected to the west by bus route 751.

Line	Route
S1	Solingen Hbf – Düsseldorf Hbf – Angermund – Duisburg Hbf – Essen Hbf – Bochum Hbf – Dortmund Hbf
751	Düsseldorf, Kaiserpfalz – Klemensplatz – Schloss Kalkum – Angermund – Ratingen – Lintorf – Hösel
