= Duisburg-Buchholz station =

Railway station in Duisburg, Germany

Duisburg Buchholz
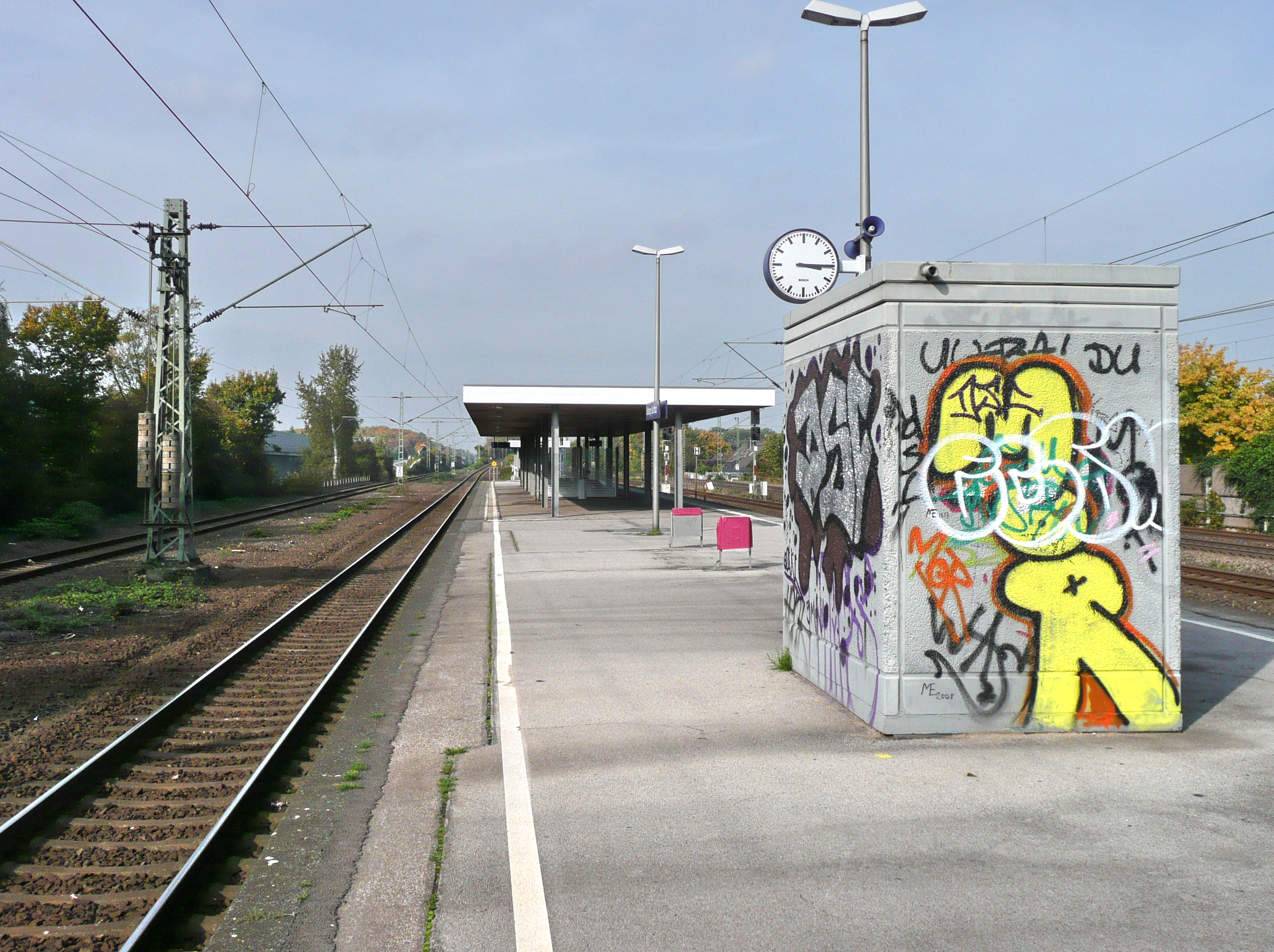

General information
- Location: Duisburg, NRW; Germany
- Coordinates: 51°22′59″N 6°46′32″E
- Owner: DB Netz
- Operator: DB Station&Service
- Lines: Cologne–Duisburg (KBS 450.1)
- Platforms: 2
- Train operators: DB Regio NRW

Construction
- Accessible: Yes

Other information
- Station code: 1377
- DS100 code: EDBU
- IBNR: 8001600
- Category: 4
- Fare zone: VRR: 332
- Website: www.bahnhof.de

History
- Opened: 1970/71

Services
| Preceding station | Rhine-Ruhr S-Bahn | Following station |
|---|---|---|
| Duisburg-Großenbaum towards Solingen Hbf | S1 | Duisburg Schlenk towards Dortmund Hbf |
Location
- Location within North Rhine-Westphalia

Duisburg-Buchholz station is a station in the suburb of Buchholz of the city of Duisburg in the German state of North Rhine-Westphalia. It is on the Cologne–Duisburg railway and it is classified by Deutsche Bahn as a category 4 station. The station was opened in 1970 or 1971.

The station is served by Rhine-Ruhr S-Bahn line S 1 (Dortmund–Solingen), running between Essen and Düsseldorf every 30 minutes during the day on weekdays.

It is also served by two bus routes operated by Duisburger Verkehrsgesellschaft at 30-minute intervals: 934 and 940.
