= Duisburg-Rahm station =

Railway station in Duisburg, Germany

Duisburg Rahm
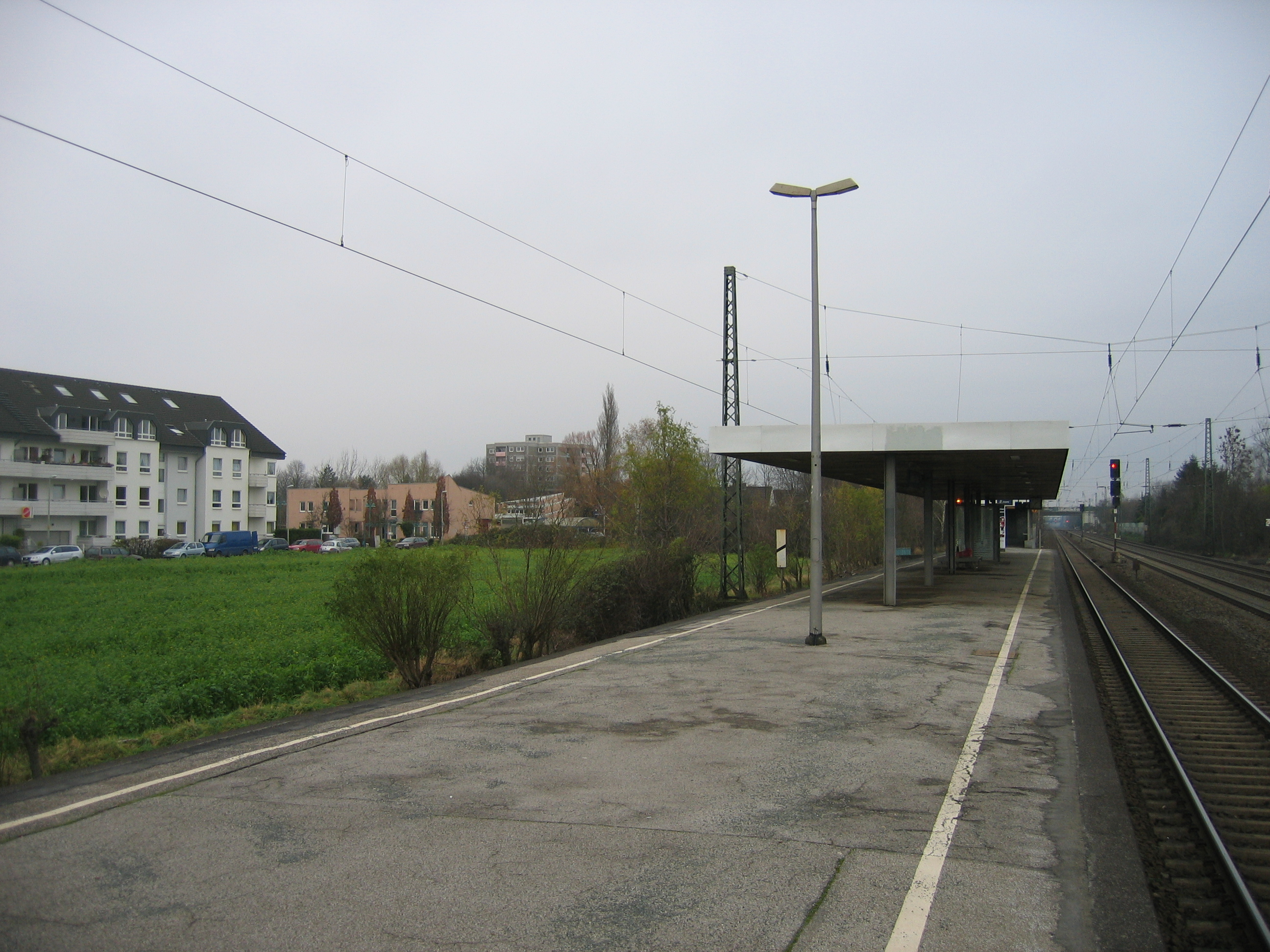

General information
- Location: Am Rahmer Bach 86; Duisburg, NRW; Germany
- Coordinates: 51°20′48″N 6°46′48″E
- Owner: DB Netz
- Operator: DB Station&Service
- Lines: Cologne–Duisburg (KBS 450.1)
- Platforms: 1 island platform
- Tracks: 2
- Train operators: DB Regio NRW

Construction
- Accessible: No

Other information
- Station code: 1384
- DS100 code: EDRM
- IBNR: 8001609
- Category: 5
- Fare zone: VRR: 332
- Website: www.bahnhof.de

History
- Opened: 30 September 1973; 52 years ago

Services
Preceding station	Rhine-Ruhr S-Bahn	Following station
Angermund towards Solingen Hbf	S1	Duisburg-Großenbaum towards Dortmund Hbf
Location
- Location within North Rhine-Westphalia

Duisburg-Rahm station is a station in the suburb of Rahm of the city of Duisburg in the German state of North Rhine-Westphalia. It is on the Cologne–Duisburg railway and it is classified by Deutsche Bahn as a category 5 station. The station was opened on 30 September 1973.

The station is served by Rhine-Ruhr S-Bahn line S 1 (Dortmund–Solingen) every 30 minutes during the day on weekdays between Essen and Düsseldorf.

It is also served by bus route 728, operated by Rheinbahn with 11 services a day, and by bus route 940, operated by Duisburger Verkehrsgesellschaft at 30-minute intervals.
