= Duisburg Schlenk station =

Railway station in Duisburg, Germany

Duisburg Schlenk
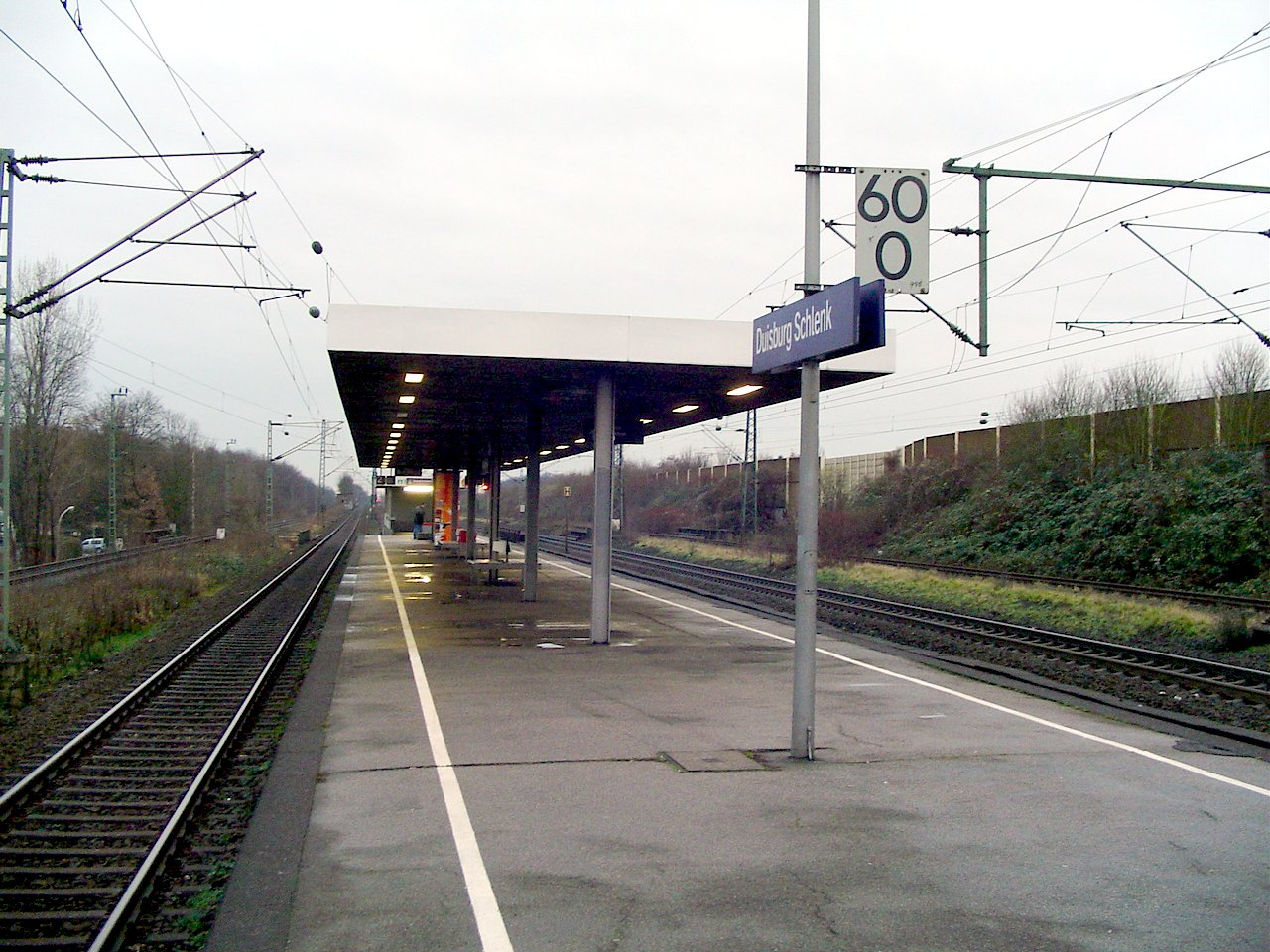

General information
- Location: Im Schlenk 89; Duisburg, NRW; Germany
- Coordinates: 51°24′09″N 6°46′24″E
- Owner: DB Netz
- Operator: DB Station&Service
- Lines: Cologne–Duisburg (KBS 450.1)
- Platforms: 1 island platform
- Tracks: 5
- Train operators: DB Regio NRW

Construction
- Accessible: Yes

Other information
- Station code: 1375
- DS100 code: EDSL
- IBNR: 8001596
- Category: 5
- Fare zone: VRR: 330 and 332
- Website: www.bahnhof.de

History
- Opened: 1970/71

Services
Preceding station	Rhine-Ruhr S-Bahn	Following station
Duisburg-Buchholz towards Solingen Hbf	S1	Duisburg Hbf towards Dortmund Hbf
Location
- Location within North Rhine-Westphalia

Duisburg Schlenk station is a station in city of Duisburg in the German state of North Rhine-Westphalia. It is at the intersection of the streets of Im Schlenk and Sternstraße. It is on the Cologne–Duisburg railway and it is classified by Deutsche Bahn as a category 5 station. The station was opened in 1970 or 1971.

The station is served by Rhine-Ruhr S-Bahn line S 1 (Dortmund–Solingen), running between Essen and Düsseldorf every 30 minutes during the day on weekdays.

It is also served by bus route 930 and 931, operated by Duisburger Verkehrsgesellschaft at 30-minute intervals.
