= Düsseldorf Airport station =

Railway station in Düsseldorf

Düsseldorf Flughafen
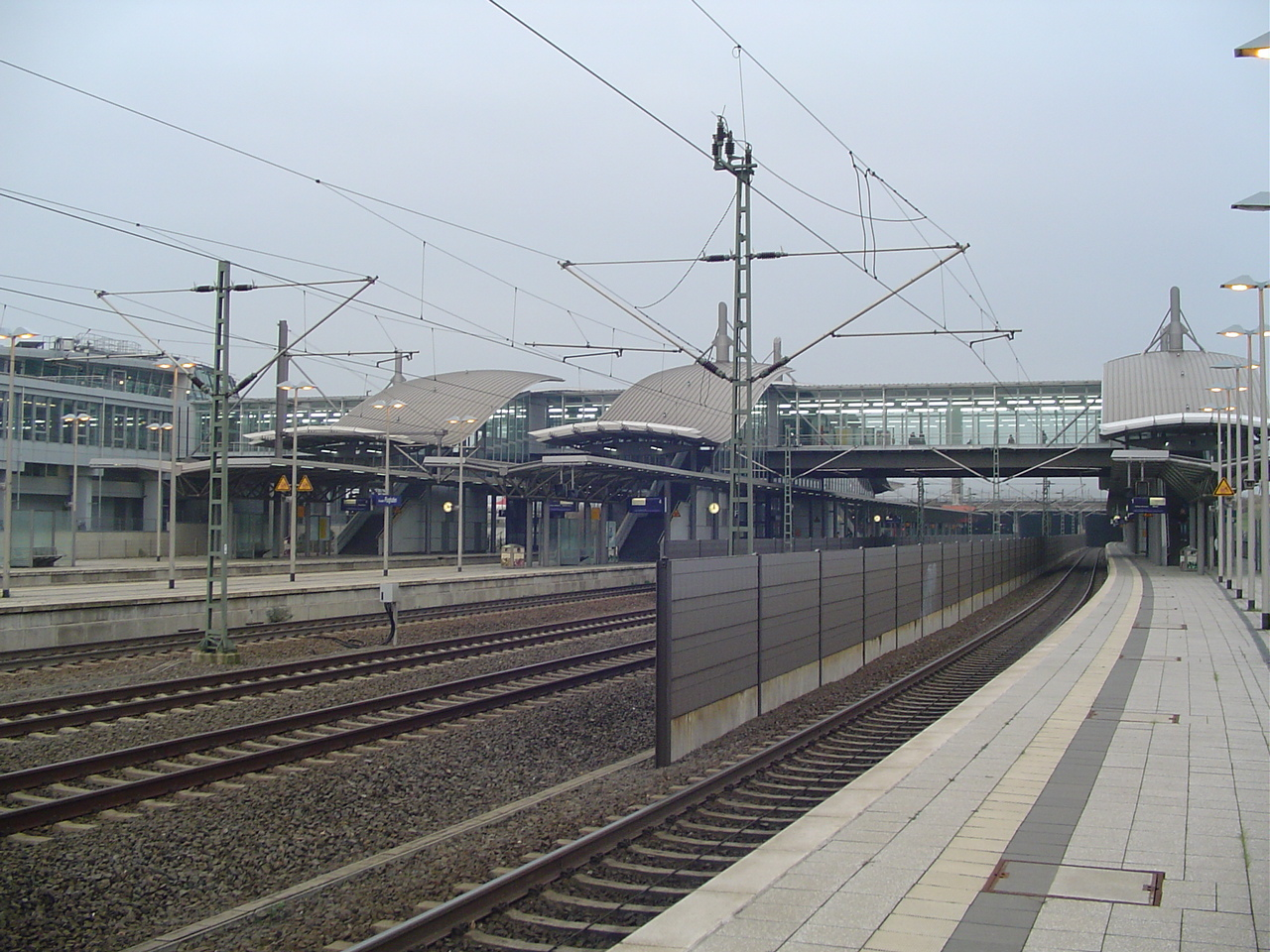
- Platforms

General information
- Location: Ahrensplatz 1; 40474 Düsseldorf; Lohausen, Düsseldorf, NRW; Germany
- Coordinates: 51°17′30″N 6°47′11″E
- Owner: DB Netz
- Operator: DB Station&Service
- Line: Cologne–Duisburg line S1
- Platforms: 3
- Tracks: 4

Construction
- Accessible: Yes

Other information
- Station code: 1400
- DS100 code: KDFF (long-distance); KDFFH (S-Bahn)
- IBNR: 8000082
- Category: 2
- Fare zone: VRR: 432; VRS: 1430 (VRR transitional zone)
- Website: www.bahnhof.de/en/duesseldorf-flughafen

History
- Opened: 26 May 2000
Services
| Preceding station | Eurostar | Following station |
|---|---|---|
| Düsseldorf Hbf towards Paris-Nord | Eurostar | Duisburg Hbf towards Dortmund Hbf |
| Preceding station | DB Fernverkehr | Following station |
| Düsseldorf Hbf towards Köln Hbf | ICE 10 | Duisburg Hbf towards Berlin Ostbahnhof |
| Düsseldorf Hbf towards Köln Hbf | IC 51 | Duisburg Hbf towards Gera Hbf |
| Preceding station | National Express Germany | Following station |
| Düsseldorf Hbf towards Aachen Hbf | RE 1 (NRW-Express) | Duisburg Hbf towards Hamm (Westf) Hbf |
| Düsseldorf Hbf towards Koblenz Hbf | RE 5 (Rhein-Express) | Duisburg Hbf towards Wesel |
| Düsseldorf Hbf towards Cologne/Bonn Airport | RE 6 (Rhein-Weser-Express) | Duisburg Hbf towards Minden |
| Düsseldorf Hbf Terminus | RE 11 (Rhein-Hellweg-Express) | Duisburg Hbf towards Kassel-Wilhelmshöhe |
| Preceding station | DB Regio NRW | Following station |
| Düsseldorf Hbf Terminus | RE 2 | Duisburg Hbf towards Osnabrück Hbf |
| Preceding station | | Following station |
| Düsseldorf Hbf Terminus | RE 3 | Duisburg Hbf towards Hamm (Westf) Hbf |
| Preceding station | VIAS | Following station |
| Düsseldorf Hbf Terminus | RE 19 | Duisburg Hbf towards Arnhem Centraal or Bocholt |
| Preceding station | Rhine-Ruhr S-Bahn | Following station |
| Düsseldorf-Unterrath towards Solingen Hbf | S1 | Düsseldorf-Angermund towards Dortmund Hbf |
Location

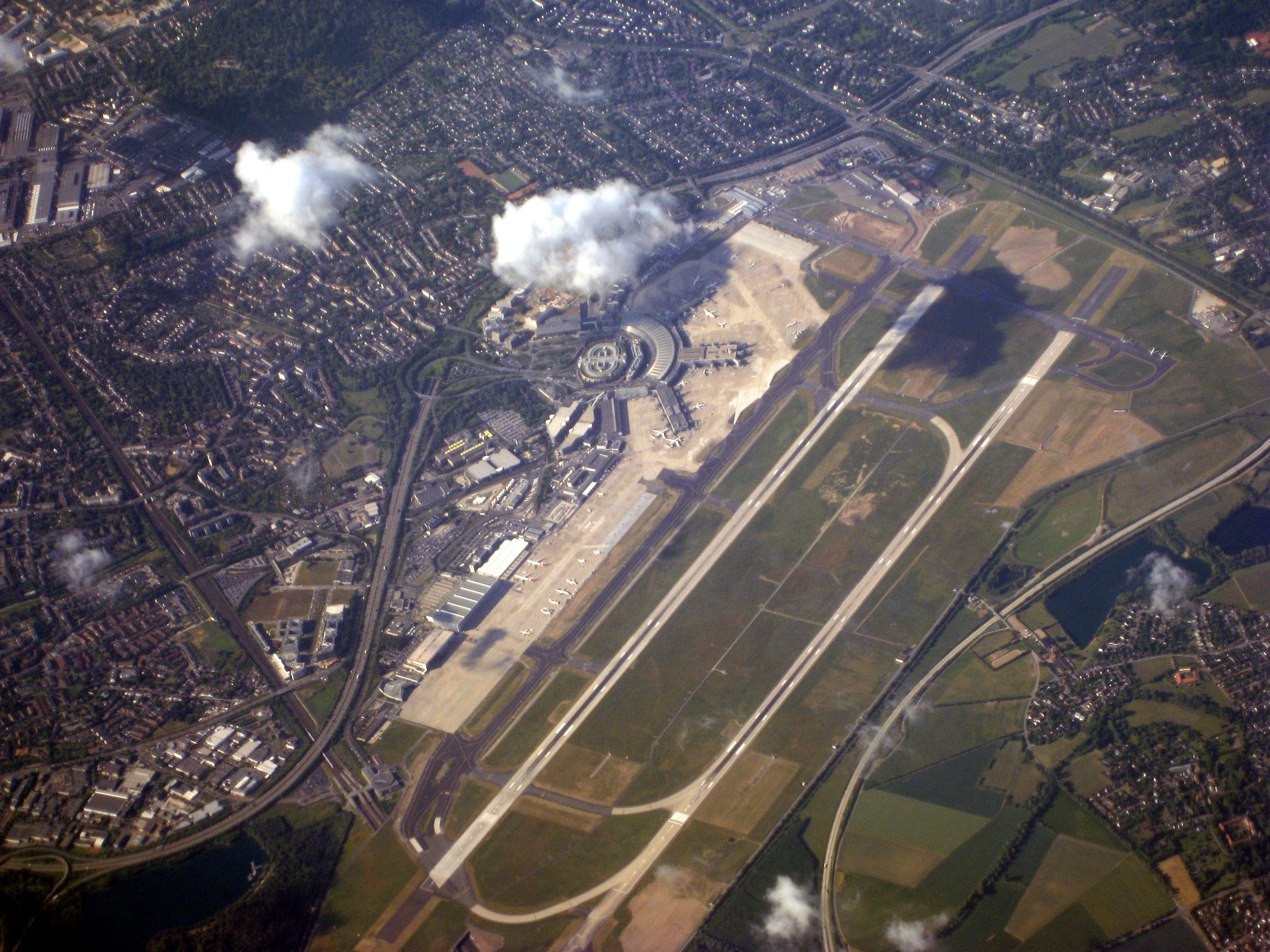
Aerial view of the airport; the station is visible on the bottom left end of the runway

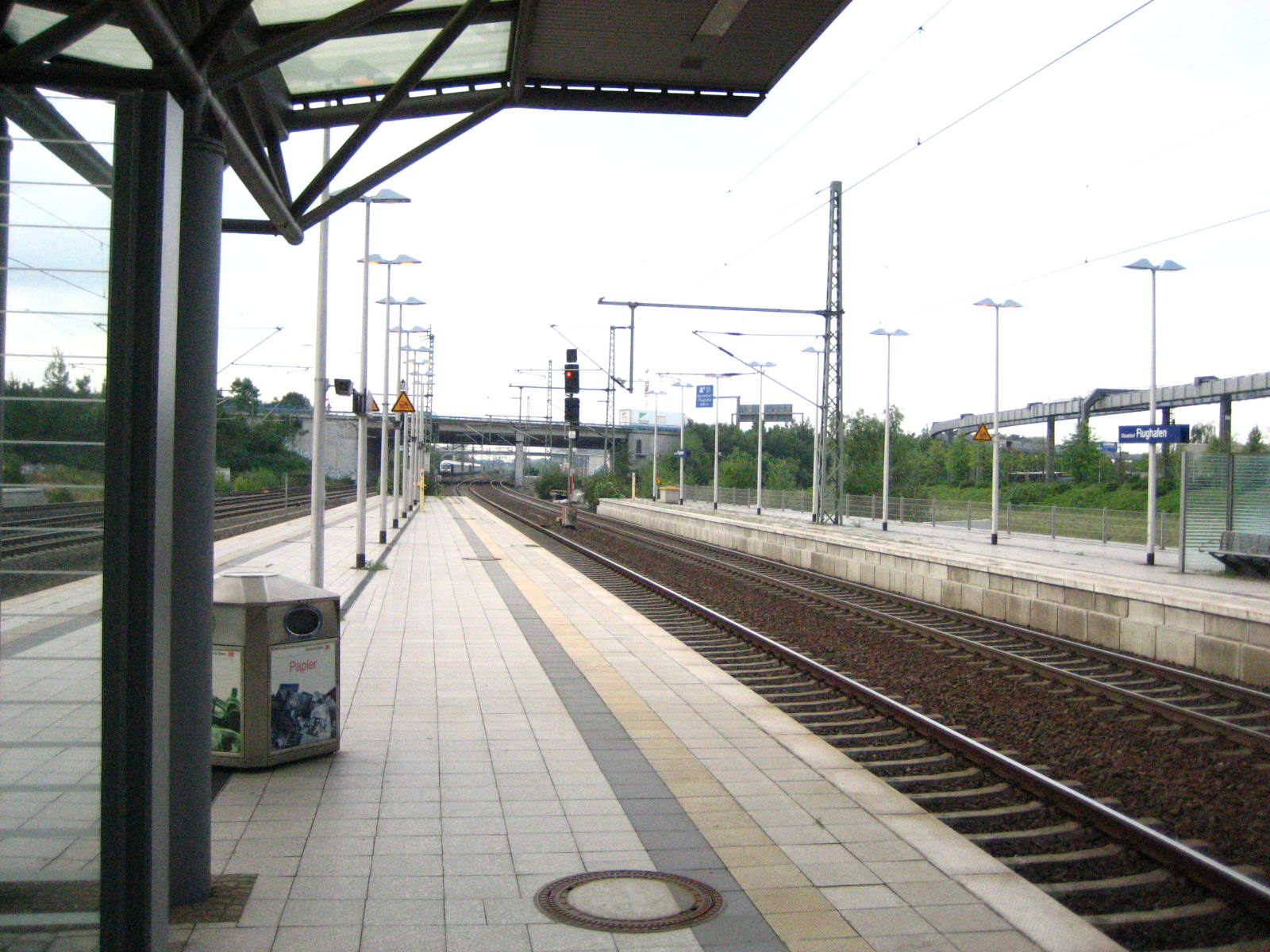
View of the tracks

Düsseldorf Airport (Bahnhof Düsseldorf Flughafen) is a railway station in Düsseldorf, Germany, on the Cologne–Duisburg line that connects Düsseldorf Airport to Düsseldorf-Stadtmitte and long-distance trains, most of them ICE trains. Opened in May 2000, the new railway station has the capacity of 300 train departures per day.

== History ==
The federal government provided €14.6 million towards the construction of Düsseldorf Airport station. It was inaugurated on 26 May 2000, in the presence of Chancellor Gerhard Schröder and Premier of North Rhine-Westphalia, Wolfgang Clement. The station cost DM 125 million to build and went into operation on 28 May 2000.

On 1 July 2002, the SkyTrain was opened. The track is 2.5 km (1.6 mi) long and 23 m (75 ft) high. After the commissioning of the SkyTrain had been delayed by a year due to software problems, the train stopped operations six times in the first two weeks of public operations and was then closed to 26 August.

== Current operations ==
Up to 300 trains stop here each day. It consists of a mainline station and an S-Bahn station, which share an entrance building. The mainline station has two platform tracks and in between there are two through tracks, running in each direction. These through tracks for trains not stopping at the station allow operations at speeds of up to 200 km/h (120 mph). The S-Bahn station lies to the west of the mainline station and also has two platform tracks. The SkyTrain station is further to the west.

== Train services ==
=== Long distance ===
The station is served by the following long-distance services (as of 2022):

| Line | Route | Frequency |
|---|---|---|
| ICE 10 | Berlin Ostbahnhof – Berlin – Hannover – Bielefeld – Hamm – Dortmund – Essen – Duisburg – Düsseldorf Airport – Düsseldorf (– Cologne) | Hourly |
| IC 51 | Gera – Jena – Erfurt – Kassel-Wilhelmshöhe – Hamm – Düsseldorf Airport – Düsseldorf | One train pair |
| Eurostar | Paris-Nord – Brussels-South – Liège-Guillemins – Aachen – Cologne – Düsseldorf – Düsseldorf Airport – Duisburg – Essen – Dortmund | Individual services |

=== Regional ===
In local passenger service, Düsseldorf Airport is served by several regional and S-Bahn lines (as of 2020):

| Line | Route | Frequency |
|---|---|---|
| RE 1 NRW-Express | Aachen – Eschweiler – Düren – Horrem – Cologne – Düsseldorf – Düsseldorf Airport – Duisburg – Mülheim – Essen – Bochum – Dortmund – Hamm | 60 min |
| RE 2 Rhein-Haard-Express | Düsseldorf – Düsseldorf Airport – Duisburg – Mülheim – Essen – Gelsenkirchen – Recklinghausen – Münster | 60 min |
| RE 3 Rhein-Emscher-Express | Düsseldorf – Düsseldorf Airport – Duisburg – Oberhausen – Wanne-Eickel Hauptbahnhof – Gelsenkirchen – Herne – Dortmund – Hamm | 60 min |
| RE 5 Rhein-Express | Wesel – Duisburg – Düsseldorf Airport – Düsseldorf – Cologne – Bonn – Remagen – Andernach – Koblenz | 60 mins |
| RE 6 Rhein-Weser-Express | Minden – Herford – Bielefeld – Hamm – Dortmund – Essen – Mülheim – Duisburg – Düsseldorf Airport – Düsseldorf – Neuss – Cologne – Cologne/Bonn Airport | 60 min |
| RE 11; Rhein-Hellweg-Express | Düsseldorf – Düsseldorf Airport – Duisburg – Mülheim – Essen – Dortmund – Hamm – Paderborn (– Kassel-Wilhelmshöhe) | 60 min |
| RE 19; Rhein-IJssel-Express | Arnhem – Emmerich – Wesel – Oberhausen – Duisburg – Düsseldorf Airport – Düsseldorf | 60 mins |
| S1 | Dortmund – Bochum – Essen – Mülheim – Duisburg – Düsseldorf Airport – Düsseldorf – Hilden – Solingen | 30 min 20 min (between Duisburg and Solingen on week days) |

== See also ==
- Rail transport in Germany
- Railway stations in Germany
