= Köln-Buchforst station =

Railway station in Buchforst, Germany

Köln Buchforst
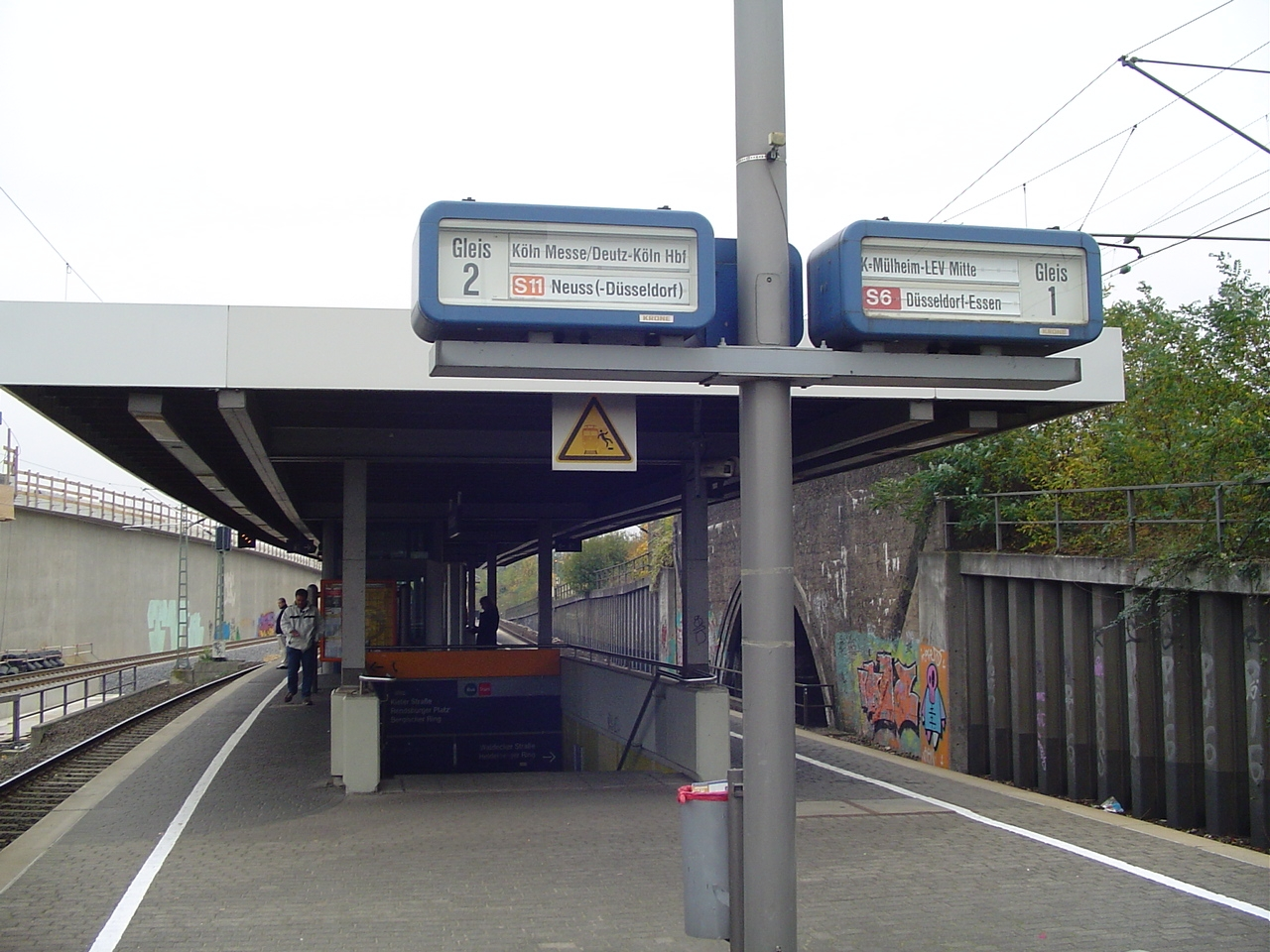

General information
- Location: Waldecker Str. 60, Cologne, NRW; Germany
- Coordinates: 50°57′13″N 07°00′16″E
- Lines: Cologne–Duisburg railway; Sülz Valley Railway
- Platforms: 2

Construction
- Accessible: Yes

Other information
- Station code: 3325
- DS100 code: KKBH
- IBNR: 8003364
- Category: 5
- Fare zone: VRS: 2100
- Website: www.bahnhof.de

History
- Opened: 26 May 1990

Services
Preceding station	Rhine-Ruhr S-Bahn	Following station
Köln Messe/Deutz towards Köln-Nippes	S6	Köln-Mülheim towards Essen Hbf
Preceding station	Cologne S-Bahn	Following station
Köln Messe/Deutz towards Düsseldorf Airport Terminal	S11	Köln-Mülheim towards Bergisch Gladbach
Location
- Location within North Rhine-Westphalia

Köln-Buchforst is a railway station situated at Buchforst, Cologne in western Germany. It is served by the S6 of the Rhine-Ruhr S-Bahn and S11 of the Cologne S-Bahn.

== Location ==
The station is located in the north of Köln-Buchforst, next to the border with the district of Mülheim. Half a kilometre south-west of Köln-Mülheim station, it serves to connect a densely populated part of the city of Cologne to the network of the Rhine-Ruhr S-Bahn.

The access to the station is located in Bertoldistraße where it passes under the railway. On both sides of the street there are stairs leading up to the central platform. The central platform is built at the S-Bahn standard height of 96 cm above the rail and is suitable for barrier-free access to the trains. A lift gives access from the street.

The station has the usual amenities (seating, ticket vending machine) of modern S-Bahn stations. Nearly half of the platform is covered by a platform canopy. A special feature is located at each end of the platform. Since both platforms are on a curve, train dispatching is supported by video monitors. Video cameras monitor the areas of the platform edges and the train driver can watch the door-handle areas via three monitors.

The station mainly serves to connect Buchforst with Cologne Hauptbahnhof. Although Buchforst already was already connected by the Stadtbahn to the city centre, only the S-Bahn connection enabled a direct connection to the Hauptbahnhof. The local distribution function of the station is also supported by buses, with the bus stop located directly under the station.

== History ==
The S-Bahn station is quite new. The station was built with the construction of the Cologne S-Bahn line from Mülheim to Nippes. For this purpose, the southern freight train (Köln-Kalk Nord/Mülheim–Köln-Deutzerfeld) was relaid and reduced to a single track. The station itself was built on the former Köln-Mülheim–Köln-Deutz (tief) line, which had been closed since the Second World War. The construction of the station was begun in 1986 and it was taken into operations on line S 11 for the summer 1990 timetable. In the summer of 1991, the complete commissioning of the main line followed with its extension to Düsseldorf. Since then line S 6 has also stopped in Köln-Buchforst.

== Rail services ==
Dellbrück is served by line 6 of the Rhine-Ruhr S-Bahn at 20-minute intervals from Monday to Friday and at 30-minute intervals on the weekend and by line 11 of the Cologne S-Bahn at 20-minute intervals every day.
