= Duisburg-Großenbaum station =

Railway station in Duisburg, Germany

Duisburg Großenbaum
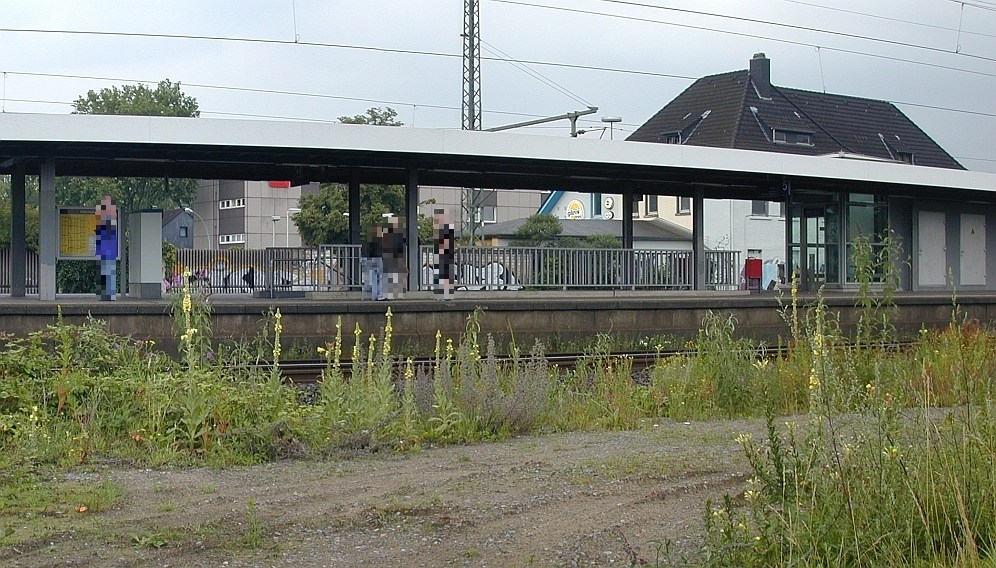

General information
- Location: Duisburg, NRW; Germany
- Coordinates: 51°21′54″N 6°46′40″E
- Owner: DB Netz
- Operator: DB Station&Service
- Lines: Cologne–Duisburg (KBS 450.1)
- Platforms: 2
- Train operators: DB Regio NRW

Construction
- Accessible: Yes

Other information
- Station code: 1379
- DS100 code: EDGR
- IBNR: 8001602
- Category: 4
- Fare zone: VRR: 332
- Website: www.bahnhof.de

History
- Opened: 9 February 1846

Services
Preceding station	Rhine-Ruhr S-Bahn	Following station
Duisburg-Rahm towards Solingen Hbf	S1	Duisburg-Buchholz towards Dortmund Hbf
Location
- Location within North Rhine-Westphalia

Duisburg-Großenbaum station is a station in the district of Großenbaum of the city of Duisburg in the German state of North Rhine-Westphalia. It is on the Cologne–Duisburg railway and it is classified by Deutsche Bahn as a category 5 station. The station was opened on 9 February 1846 as Großenbaum. It was renamed Duisburg-Großenbaum on 14 May 1950. A station building was built in 1856, but it is now used as a cafe, called Gleis drei (track three).

The station is served by Rhine-Ruhr S-Bahn line S 1 (Dortmund–Solingen) every 20 minutes during the day on weekdays, and every 30 minutes on weekends between Essen and Düsseldorf.

It is also served by three bus routes operated by Duisburger Verkehrsgesellschaft at 30-minute intervals: 934, 940 and 941.
