= Welver station =

Railway station in Welver, Germany

Welver
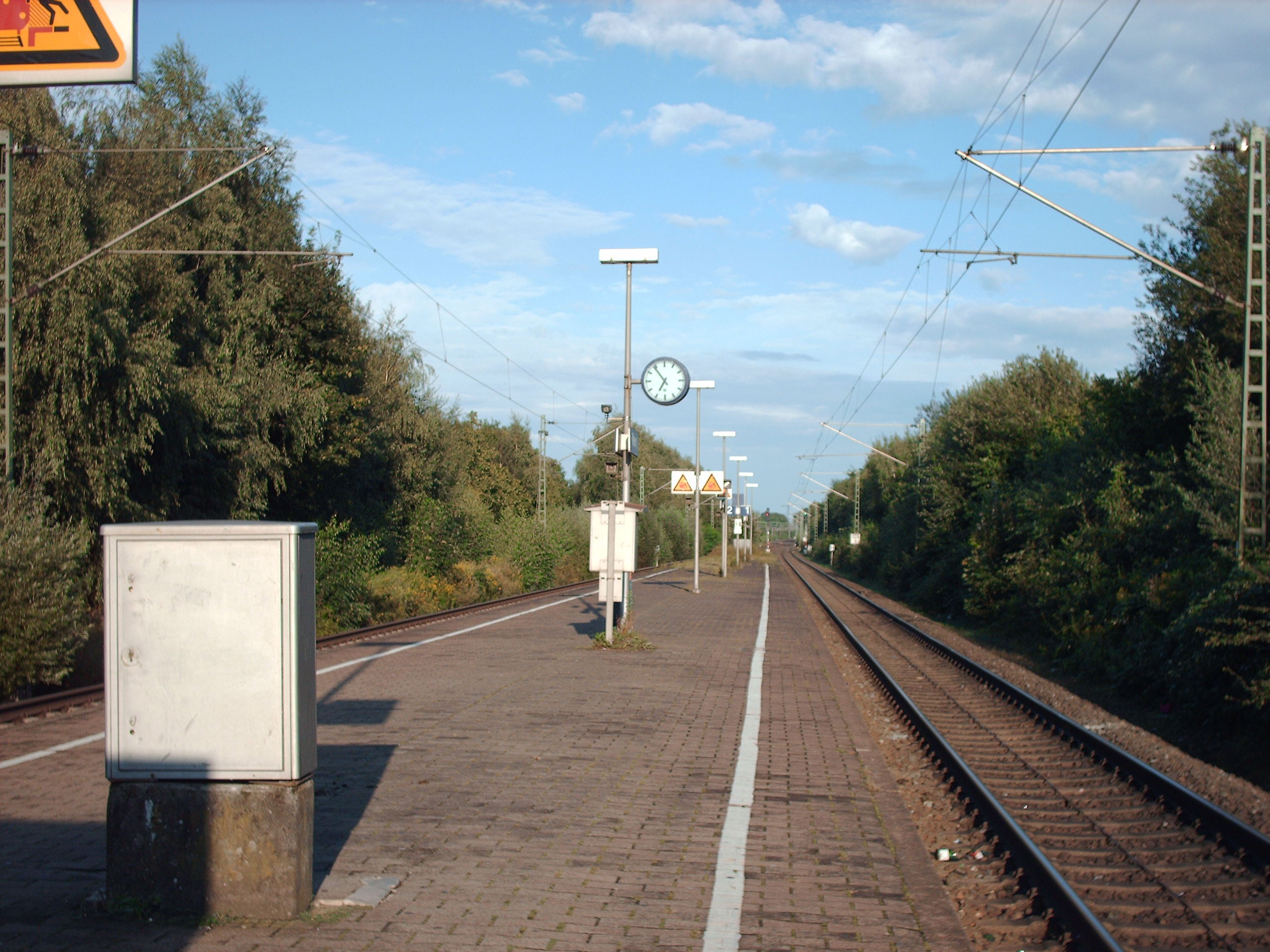
- Platforms

General information
- Location: Bahnhofstr., Welver, NRW; Germany
- Coordinates: 51°36′59″N 7°57′24″E
- Lines: Hamm–Warburg railway; Welver–Sterkrade (closed)
- Platforms: 2

Construction
- Accessible: No

Other information
- Station code: 6664
- DS100 code: EWVE
- IBNR: 8006323
- Category: 5
- Fare zone: Westfalentarif: 49441
- Website: www.bahnhof.de

History
- Opened: 1850
Location

Welver station is a station in Welver in the Soest district of the German state of North Rhine-Westphalia. It has been categorised as a halt (Haltepunkt) since 1991, but it was previously categorised as a station. It is located on the Hamm–Warburg railway. The Welver–Sterkrade railway, which formerly branched here, was closed in 1968 and later dismantled.

== History ==
On 1 October 1850, the region was given a connection to the railway network with the opening of the Hamm-Warburg railway of the Royal Westphalian Railway Company. The station between Hamm and Soest was named "Welver", although the whole station precinct was in the Meyerich district. It is believed that this was either intended to avoid confusion of the name "Meyerich" with "Meiderich" (in Duisburg) or because the name "Welver" had more than local significance (and was used by the parish and a former convent). The station in neighbouring Borgeln was opened in 1880.

The Welver – Dortmund Süd – Sterkrade railway was opened in 1876. Thus, the station became a junction and importance of the surrounding communities was increased. Over the following decades, the area around the station was the centre of a new settlement, which bound together the hilltop villages of Welver and Meyerich, which were nearly two kilometres apart.

This area is now a traffic node and a business centre, while the original villages are now in peripheral locations. Shortly afterwards a post office was also opened in the new area, now called am Bahnhof (at the station). A pharmacy, a dairy, a loan and savings bank, grocery stores, grain and animal feed businesses and craft businesses were established at the station. The restaurants benefited. Travellers from the distinct away from the railway came to Welver, put their teams in the stables of inns and refreshed themselves before travelling further. Local business made their rounds in the surrounding villages. In the summer, buyers from the big cities bought fruit here and shipped it by rail in large baskets to their clients in the industrial centres. Otto Koester, the first practicing medical doctor in Welver, established his residence and practice at house no. 90 (demolished in 1974 and now used for parking). Even a bowling alley was established in the new settlement (at Wilhelm Huffelmann restaurant at No. 90a—later Bergmann’s barber shop). The first station business trained Christian Wiemer in 1880. Later he opened the regionally known Buchwald restaurant.

== Services ==
Welver station is served by the RB89 Regionalbahn service, called the Ems-Börde-Bahn. It operates in the north to Hamm and Münster and south to Soest and Paderborn. Services run between Münster and Paderborn every 30 minutes. Services run every 120 minutes (60 minutes at the weekends) between Paderborn and Warburg. Individual services in the morning and evening run to/from Kassel-Wilhelmshöhe.
