= Duisburg-Wedau station =

Railway station in Duisburg, Germany

Duisburg-Wedau
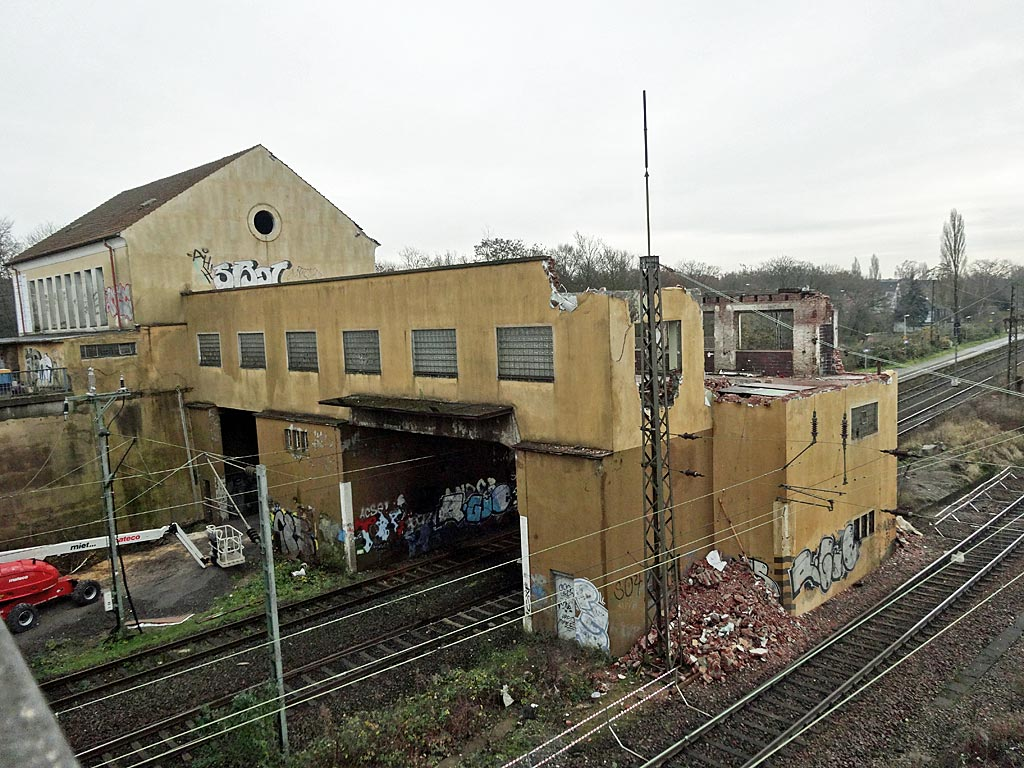
- 2015

General information
- Location: Wedauer Brücke 1; 47279 Duisburg; North Rhine-Westphalia; Germany
- Coordinates: 51.3992°N 6.8037°E
- Owner: DB Netz
- Operator: DB Station&Service
- Lines: Troisdorf–Mülheim-Speldorf railway Duisburg-Wedau–Bottrop Süd railway
- Platforms: 1 side platform
- Train operators: DB Regio NRW

Other information
- Station code: 1387
- DS100 code: EDWD
- IBNR: 8001612
- Category: 6
- Fare zone: VRR: 332
- Website: www.bahnhof.de
Location
- Location within North Rhine-Westphalia

Duisburg-Wedau station was a railway station in the Wedau district in the city of Duisburg, located in North Rhine-Westphalia, Germany. It was closed in 2019.
