= S1 (Rhine-Ruhr S-Bahn) =

Line S1 is a S-Bahn line on the Rhine-Ruhr network. It is operated by DB Regio. It runs from Dortmund via Bochum and Essen to Duisburg. From there it travels south to Düsseldorf and Hilden before continuing to Solingen. It is operated on weekdays at 15-minute intervals between Dortmund Hbf and Essen Hbf, at 20-minute intervals between Düsseldorf Hbf and Solingen and at 30-minute intervals between Düsseldorf and Essen, using coupled sets of class 422 four-car electrical multiple units.

Line S 1 runs over lines built by various railway companies:

- from Dortmund Hauptbahnhof to Duisburg over the Witten/Dortmund–Oberhausen/Duisburg railway, opened by the Bergisch-Märkische Railway Company in 1862,
- from Duisburg to Düsseldorf-Oberbilk over the Cologne–Duisburg railway, opened by the Cologne-Minden Railway Company in 1845 and
- from Düsseldorf-Oberbilk to Solingen over the Düsseldorf–Solingen railway opened by the Prussian state railways between 1891 and 1894.

S-Bahn services commenced between Bochum and Duisburg-Großenbaum on 26 May 1974. Services were extended from Großenbaum to Düsseldorf on 22 May 1977 and from Bochum to Dortmund on 25 September 1983. Services ran via Düsseldorf Airport Terminal station from 24 May 1998 to 28 May 2000. Services were extended from Düsseldorf to Solingen on 13 December 2009, replacing part of the former line S 7 service.
