= Cologne–Duisburg railway =

Railway line

Cologne-Deutz–Duisburg railway
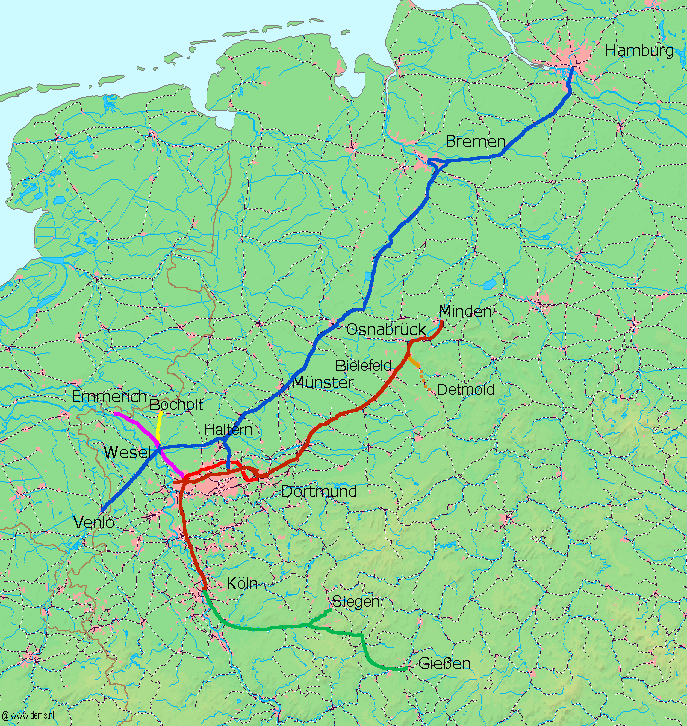
- Cologne-Minden trunk line in red

Overview
- Line number: 2650 (long distance); 2400, 2407, 2413, 2670 (S-Bahn); 2319, 2317 (local track in Düsseldorf); 2411 (Düsseldorf Hbf freight byapp)

Service
- Route number: 415 (long distance); 450.1, 450.6, 450.7 (S-Bahn)

Technical
- Line length: 64 km (40 mi)
- Track gauge: 1,435 mm (4 ft 8 1/2 in) standard gauge
- Electrification: 15 kV/16.7 Hz AC Overhead catenary
- Operating speed: 200 km/h (120 mph)

The 64 km long Cologne–Duisburg railway is one of the most important lines in Germany. It is the main axis for long distance and urban passenger rail services between Cologne and the Ruhr, served by Intercity Express, Intercity, Regional Express, regionalbahn and S-Bahn trains. It was the first section built of the Cologne-Minden trunk line and is one of the oldest railways in Germany. It was opened in 1845/46 and has been repeatedly modernized and expanded. Today the route (partly blended with lines of other former railway companies) comprises two or three double lines and is electrified throughout.

== History ==
On 18 December 1843, the Prussian government granted a concession to the Cologne-Minden Railway Company (German, old spelling: Cöln-Mindener Eisenbahn-Gesellschaft, CME) for the line, which began at what was then the CME station in Deutz (now a suburb of Cologne) with the construction of the first section to Düsseldorf, which was opened on 20 December 1845. Only a few weeks later, on 9 February 1846, the second section was completed to a temporary terminus at the site of present-day Duisburg Hauptbahnhof called the Cologne-Minden railway station, the first of three train stations built at the same place.

The route of the next section to Oberhausen, Altenessen, Gelsenkirchen, Wanne, Herne and Dortmund to Hamm was chosen over a route close to the coal mines that were then located on the north bank of the Ruhr because it was cheaper to build as it largely avoided hills. Nevertheless, it still took well over a year until 15 May 1847 for this section to be completed and put into operation. On 15 October 1847 the last section was opened to Minden, thus completing the entire 263 kilometre long, single track railway. On the same day the Royal Hanoverian State Railways opened its Hanover-Minden Railway, completing a connection to Berlin and northeastern Germany.

The line was connected to the railways on the western bank of the Rhine at Cologne on 3 October 1859 with the inauguration of the Cathedral Bridge to the back of the Central Station of the Rhenish Railway Company (Rheinische Eisenbahn-Gesellschaft, RHE).

== Current situation ==
The Cologne-Duisburg line has been continually modernised as traffic has grown and it has been electrified along its entire length.

=== Number of tracks ===
The number of tracks on the line varies between three and eight. In the section of line between Cologne and Cologne-Mülheim there are six tracks, two towards Düsseldorf and Duisburg, two towards Gruiten and Wuppertal, and two S-Bahn tracks. Between Cologne-Mülheim and Langenfeld, there are two long-distance tracks and sections of the S-Bahn are only single track sections (providing a total of three tracks). North of Langenfeld, there are again two tracks (a total of four tracks). From Düsseldorf-Oberbilk station north there are two additional tracks to the right and left of the S-Bahn to Düsseldorf; together with the local lines in this section there are eight rail tracks.

From Düsseldorf to Düsseldorf-Derendorf station the line also has up to eight single tracks, including up to two freight lines. There are six tracks past the S-Bahn branch to Düsseldorf Airport Terminal station to Düsseldorf-Unterrath Karthäuser Weg junction where the S-Bahn and two long distance-tracks merge at grade on the approach to Düsseldorf Airport station. The station itself has four platform tracks, plus two through tracks. After the airport station, the route continues as a four track line, with the platform tracks at S-Bahn stations passed by Regional-Express trains at up to 140 km/h. Immediately south of Duisburg-Großenbaum station two separate S-Bahn tracks recommence in addition to four mainline tracks, a total of six tracks. North of Duisburg-Buchholz the line becomes five tracks with two mainline tracks, two S-Bahn tracks and one freight track.

North of Duisburg Hauptbahnhof lines connect to the CME’s line to Oberhausen and Dortmund, and more importantly for today's passengers, the Ruhr route to the east via Essen to Dortmund of the former Bergisch-Märkische Railway Company.

=== Technology ===
To shorten the travel time on the long-distance trains from Cologne via Duisburg to Dortmund, the mainline was upgraded in the 1980s to enable trains to run at 200 km/h and, with the exception of the area of Düsseldorf station, equipped with the German Linienzugbeeinflussung (LZB) train protection system. This makes it possible to operate trains between Cologne and Dortmund via Duisburg in the same time as it takes on the shorter but more tortuous route via Wuppertal and Hagen. This makes it possible to provide connections between two long-distance routes across platforms at Cologne and Dortmund.

== Train services ==
Services operating across the total length of the line are three ICE services, two IC services (each usually every two hours) and two Regional-Express services, the RE 1 NRW-Express and the RE 5 Rhein-Express (both hourly). Between Düsseldorf and Duisburg additional services operating are the RE 2 Rhein-Haard-Express, the RE 3 Rhein-Emscher-Express, the RE 6 Rhein-Weser-Express, the RE 11 Rhein-Hellweg-Express and the RE 19 Rhein-IJssel-Express (all hourly). It is planned to replace the Regional Express services on the line by faster services, known as Rhine-Ruhr Express, which will require additional track.
