= Dortmund-Körne station =

Railway station in Dortmund, Germany

Dortmund Körne
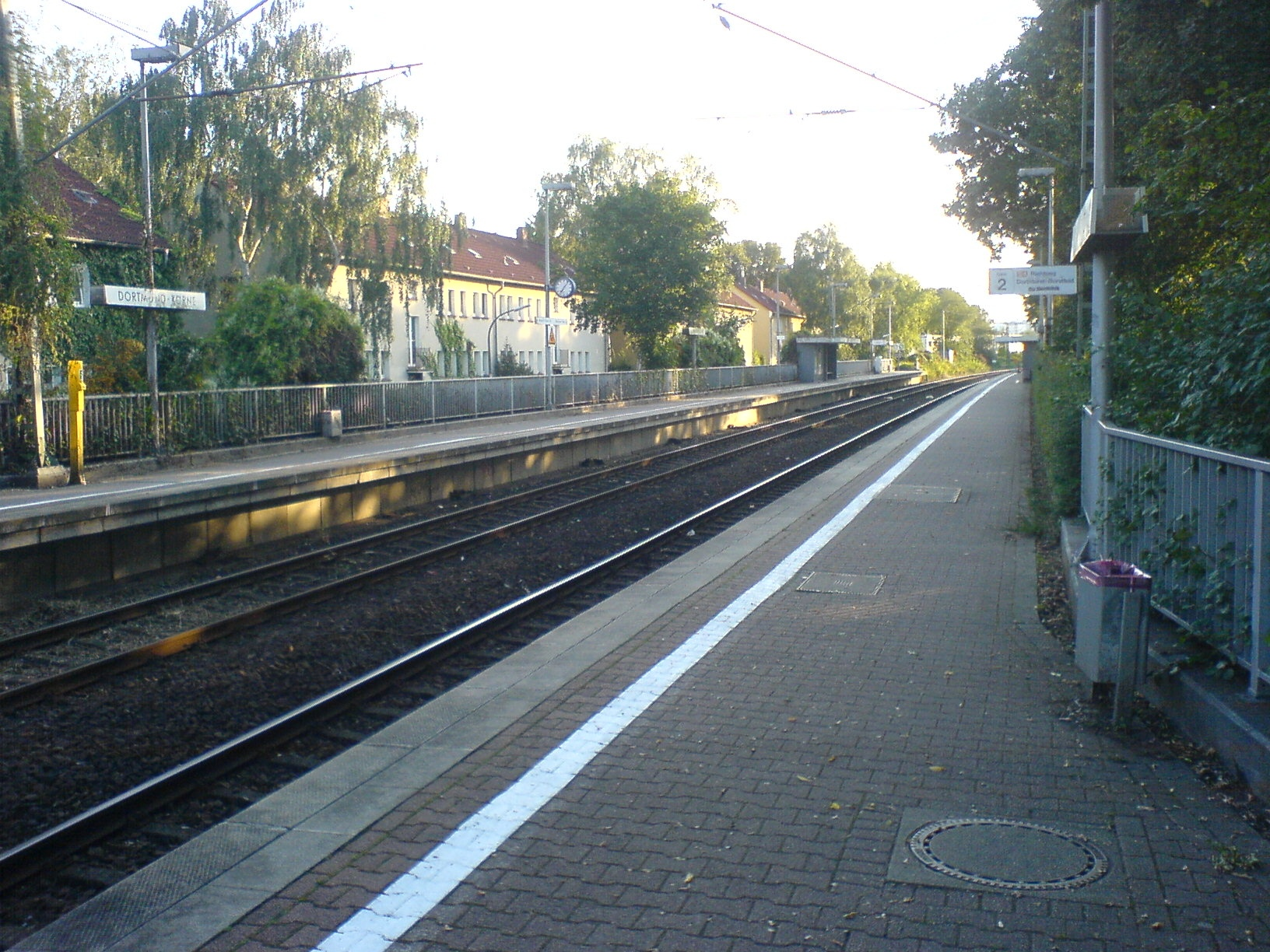

General information
- Location: Kirschbaumweg, Dortmund, NRW; Germany
- Coordinates: 51°30′49″N 7°30′58″E
- Lines: Unna–Dortmund (KBS 450.4)
- Platforms: 2

Construction
- Accessible: Yes

Other information
- Station code: 1312
- DS100 code: EDKO
- IBNR: 8001535
- Category: 6
- Fare zone: VRR: 370
- Website: www.bahnhof.de

History
- Opened: 26 May 1963

Services
Preceding station	Rhine-Ruhr S-Bahn	Following station
DO-Körne West towards DO-Lütgendortmund	S4	DO Knappschaftskrankenhaus towards Unna
Location

Dortmund-Körne is a railway station in the Dortmund district of Körne in the German state of North Rhine-Westphalia. It is classified by Deutsche Bahn as a category 6 station. It was opened on 26 May 1963 on the Welver–Sterkrade railway completed between Welver and the old Dortmund Süd (south) station by the Royal Westphalian Railway Company on 15 May 1876 and electrified on 25 May 1984.

It is served by Rhine-Ruhr S-Bahn line S 4 at 30-minute intervals (15-minute intervals in the peak between Dortmund-Lütgendortmund and Unna-Königsborn).
