= Dortmund-Asseln Mitte station =

Railway station in Dortmund, Germany

Dortmund Asseln Mitte
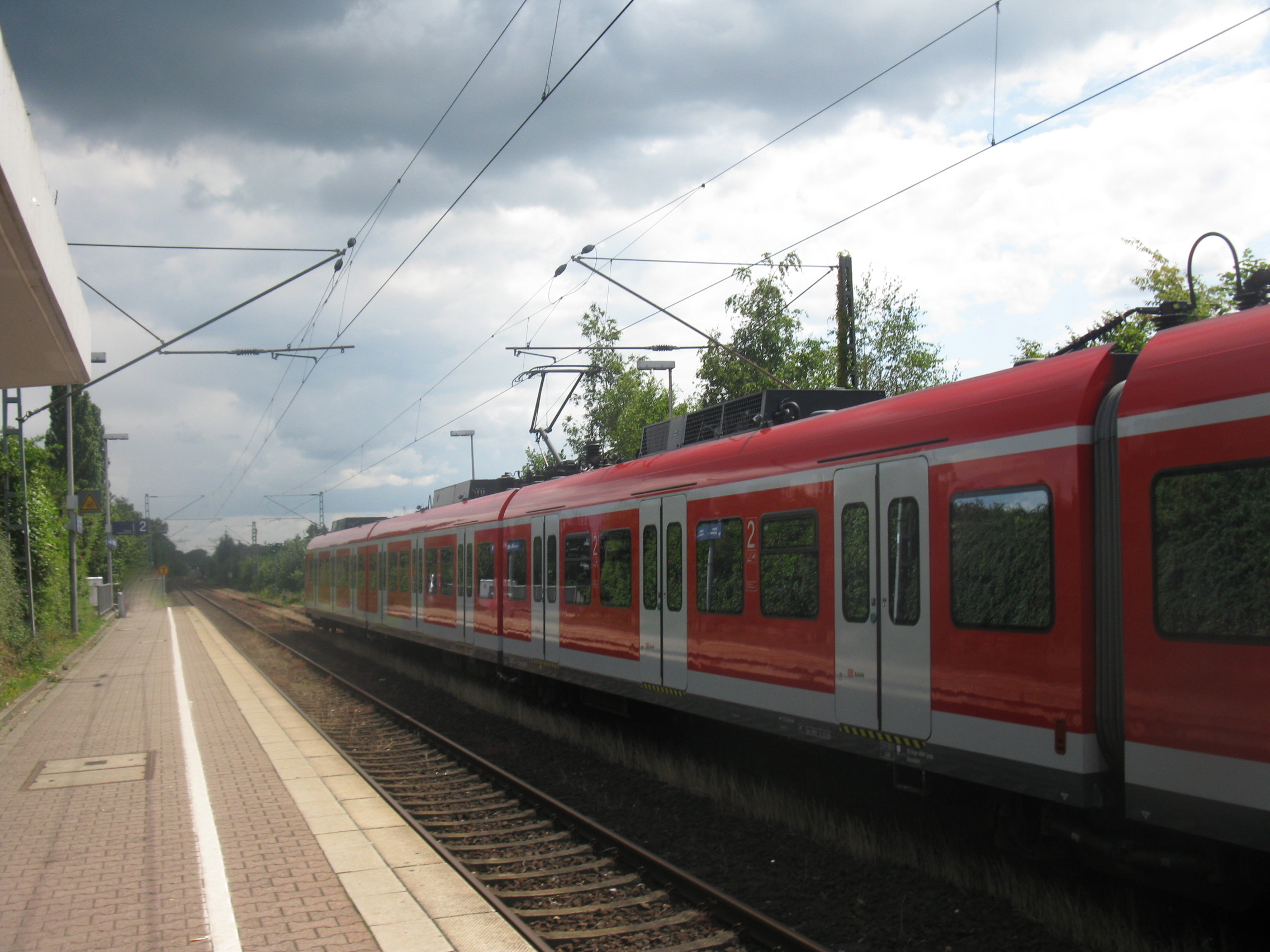

General information
- Location: Dortmund, NRW; Germany
- Coordinates: 51°31′34″N 7°35′02″E
- Owner: DB Netz
- Operator: DB Station&Service
- Lines: Unna–Dortmund (KBS 450.4)
- Platforms: 2
- Train operators: DB Regio NRW

Construction
- Accessible: Yes

Other information
- Station code: 1287
- DS100 code: EDAM
- Category: 6
- Fare zone: VRR: 384
- Website: www.bahnhof.de

History
- Opened: 1963/64

Services
Preceding station	Rhine-Ruhr S-Bahn	Following station
DO-Brackel towards DO-Lütgendortmund	S4	DO-Wickede West towards Unna
Location
- Location within North Rhine-Westphalia

Dortmund-Asseln Mitte is a railway station in the Dortmund district of Asseln in the German state of North Rhine-Westphalia. It is classified by Deutsche Bahn as a category 6 station. It was opened in 1963 or 1964 on the Welver–Sterkrade railway completed between Welver and the old Dortmund Süd (south) station by the Royal Westphalian Railway Company on 15 May 1876 and electrified on 25 May 1984.

It is served by Rhine-Ruhr S-Bahn line S 4 at 30-minute intervals (15-minute intervals in the peak between Dortmund-Lütgendortmund and Unna-Königsborn).

The station is also served by two bus routes, 426 (Kurl) and 439 (Aplerbeck – Schwerter Wald – Hörde – Stadtkrone Ost + Kurl – Husen), both operated at 30-minute intervals by the municipal bus company, Dortmunder Stadtwerke (DSW21).
