= Dortmund-Aplerbeck station =

Railway station in Dortmund, Germany

Dortmund Aplerbeck
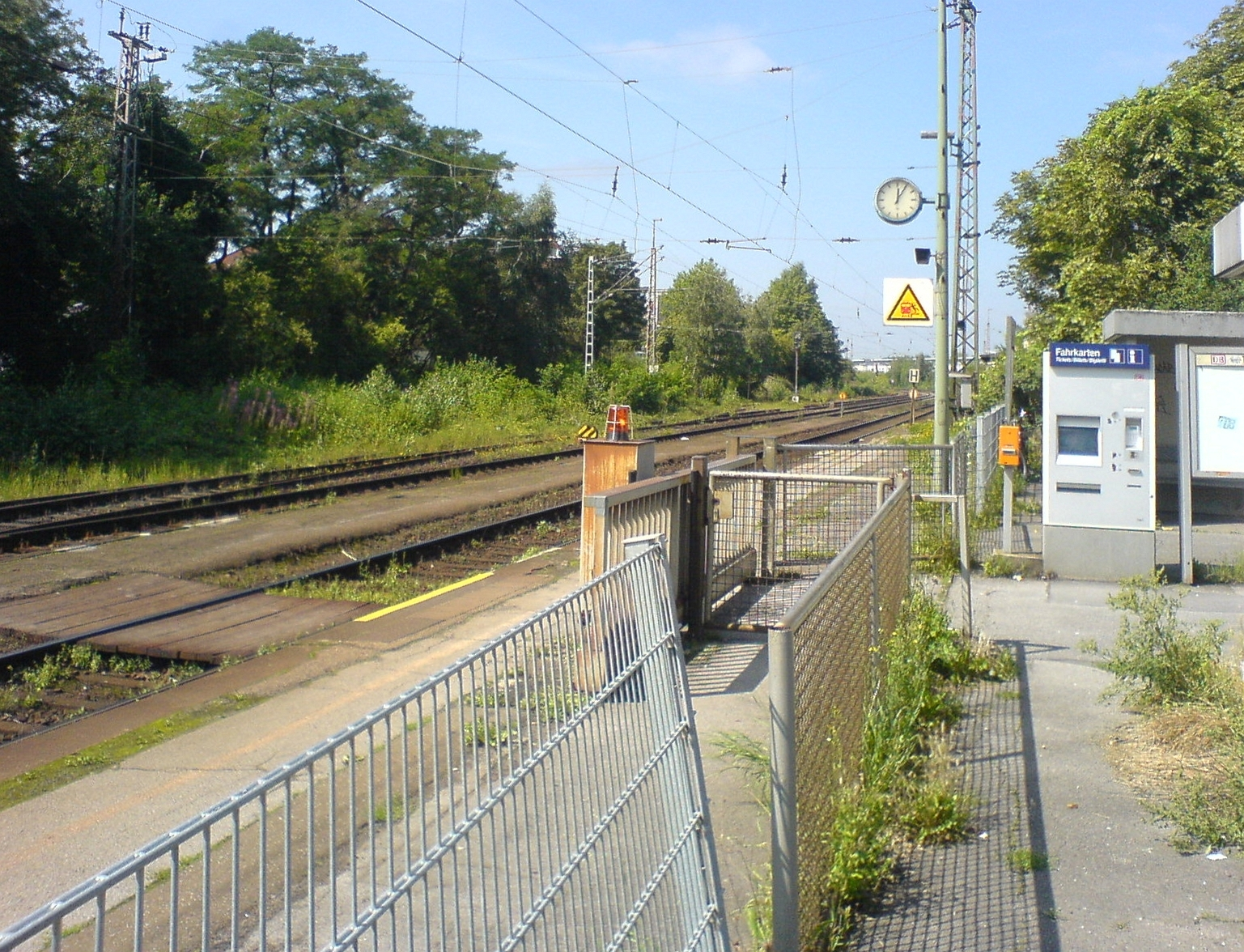
- 2007

General information
- Location: Wittbräucker Straße/Strickerstraße; 44287 Dortmund; NRW, Germany
- Coordinates: 51.4901°N 7.5538°E
- Owner: DB Netz
- Operator: DB Station&Service
- Line: Dortmund–Soest railway
- Platforms: 2 side platforms
- Tracks: 2
- Train operators: Eurobahn

Construction
- Accessible: Yes

Other information
- Station code: 1298
- DS100 code: EDAP
- IBNR: 8001523
- Category: 6
- Fare zone: VRR: 386
- Website: www.bahnhof.de

Services
Preceding station		Following station
Dortmund-Hörde towards Dortmund Hbf	RB 59	Dortmund-Sölde towards Soest
Location
- Location within North Rhine-Westphalia

Dortmund-Aplerbeck station is a railway station in the Aplerbeck district of the town of Dortmund, located in North Rhine-Westphalia, Germany.

== Rail services ==
Line	Name	Route
RB 59	Hellweg-Bahn	Dortmund Hauptbahnhof – Dortmund-Aplerbeck – Holzwickede – Unna – Soest
