= Dortmund-Wickede West station =

Railway station in Dortmund, Germany

Dortmund Wickede West
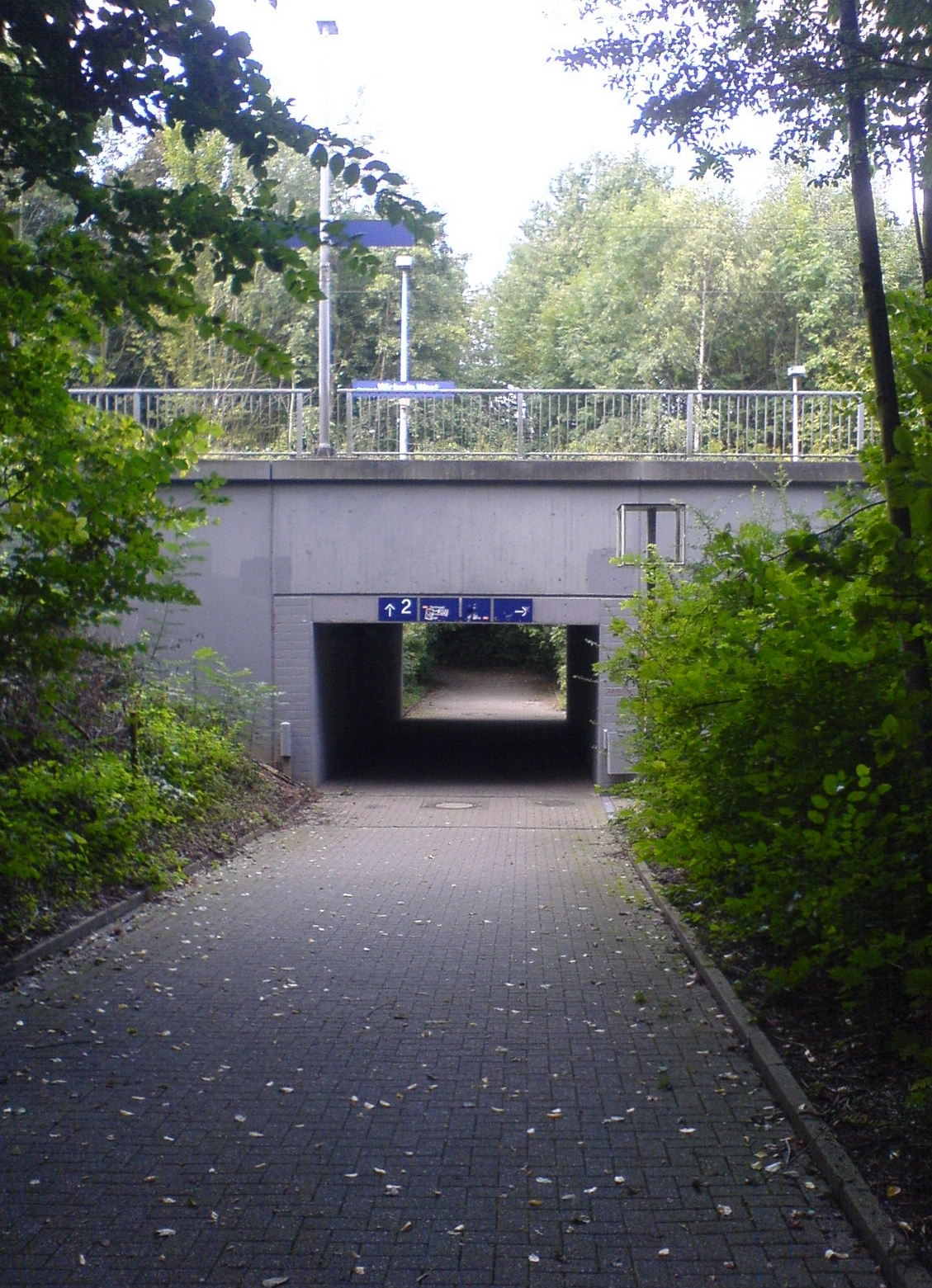

General information
- Location: Bebelstr., Dortmund, NRW; Germany
- Coordinates: 51°31′45″N 7°36′24″E
- Lines: Unna–Dortmund (KBS 450.4)
- Platforms: 2
- Train operators: DB Regio NRW

Construction
- Accessible: Yes

Other information
- Station code: 1328
- DS100 code: EDWW
- IBNR: 8003936
- Category: 6
- Fare zone: VRR: 384
- Website: www.bahnhof.de

History
- Opened: 15 May 1876

Services
Preceding station	Rhine-Ruhr S-Bahn	Following station
DO-Asseln Mitte towards DO-Lütgendortmund	S4	DO-Wickede towards Unna
Location

Dortmund-Wickede West is a railway station in the Dortmund district of Wickede in the German state of North Rhine-Westphalia. It is classified by Deutsche Bahn as a category 6 station. It was opened on 15 May 1876 on the Welver–Sterkrade railway completed between Welver and the old Dortmund Süd (south) station by the Royal Westphalian Railway Company on the same date and electrified on 25 May 1984. It was originally called Wickede-Asseln, but it was renamed Dortmund-Asseln between 1927 and 1930 and Dortmund-Wickede West on 3 June 1984.

It is served by Rhine-Ruhr S-Bahn line S 4 at 30-minute intervals (15-minute intervals in the peak between Dortmund-Lütgendortmund and Unna-Königsborn).

The station is also served by bus route 428 (Baedekerstr + Roningweg) of the municipal bus company, Dortmunder Stadtwerke (DSW21) at 20-minute intervals.
