= Fröndenberg–Kamen railway =

Railway line in Germany

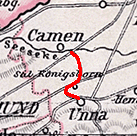
- Northern part of line

Overview
- Line number: 2852 (Fröndenberg–Unna); 2933 (Unna–Kamen)
- Locale: North Rhine-Westphalia, Germany

Service
- Route number: 437 (Fröndenberg–Unna); 450.4 (Unna–Unna-Königsborn)

Technical
- Line length: 22 km (14 mi)
- Track gauge: 1,435 mm (4 ft 8 1/2 in) standard gauge
- Electrification: 15 kV/16.7 Hz AC overhead catenary (Unna–Unna-Königsborn:)
- Operating speed: 80 km/h (49.7 mph) (maximum)

The Fröndenberg–Kamen railway is a single-track, partially electrified and partially disused railway line in the German state of North Rhine-Westphalia. It runs from Fröndenberg via Unna to Unna-Königsborn and formerly on to Kamen.

Since 2022, the line between Fröndenberg and Unna has been closed for the foreseeable future due to damage to the railway embankment caused by badgers.

== History ==
The Fröndenberg-Kamen line was built at the turn of the 20th Century as a railway branch line by the Royal railway divisions (German: königliche Eisenbahndirection) of Elberfeld and Essen of the Prussian state railways to connect, in the form of an S-shaped curve, four stations on major east-west routes, which were built in the second half of the 19th century by three competing major private railway companies in Westphalia (from north to south):

- Kamen station on the Dortmund–Hamm line, opened by the Cologne-Minden Railway Company in 1847,
- Unna-Königsborn station on the Welver–Sterkrade line, opened by the Royal Westphalian Railway Company in 1876,
- Unna station on the Dortmund–Soest line, opened by the Bergisch-Märkische Railway Company in 1855,
- Fröndenberg station on the Hagen–Warburg line, also opened by the Bergisch-Märkische Railway Company in 1870.

The first section was opened by the Royal Railway Division of Elberfeld on 2 January 1899 between Fröndenberg and Unna.

The next section from Unna to Unna-Königsborn was a joint project with the Royal Railway Division of Essen and built in just over a year. It was opened on 1 April 1900, originally for freight only.

The last part, from Unna-Königsborn to Kamen was the responsibility of the Essen Division alone. Only half a year later, the line was completed on 1 November 1900 and opened for freight. Almost a year later, on 1 October 1901, the first passenger train ran between Unna and Kamen.

== Closures ==
In early 1926, passenger traffic was discontinued on the northern section between Unna and Kamen. The Unna-Kamen-Werne light railway was opened in 1909 on a similar route as an overland tramway (interurban). It closed on 14 December 1950.

On 3 June 1955, freight traffic between Königsborn and Kamen was also discontinued and the line was subsequently dismantled. The former line can easily be identified from aerial photographs.

== Badger damage ==
On 24 July 2022, damage to the railway embankment near Frömern was discovered that was caused by badgers, leading to the line between Unna and Fröndenberg being closed. Since then, rail replacement bus services have run. In December 2022, Deutsche Bahn assumed that it would be able to resume operations in December 2023 after renovating the affected railway embankment over a length of around 300 meters. A milling-mixing-injection process was used to eliminate the voids and stabilise the embankment. In November 2023, it became known that the damage was significantly more extensive than initially estimated. A total of 140 entrances to badger burrows were found spread over the approximately eleven kilometre-long section, with the badger tunnels being said to be 1.5 kilometres long in total. In order to renovate the railway embankment, several years of preliminary and approval planning, perhaps even a planning approval procedure, are required. The line will remain closed in the affected area for several years. The fact that the affected section of the route runs through a bird sanctuary and part of it through a nature reserve complicates the necessary work because of the permits or approvals required there.

== Current operations ==
Electrification of the Unn–Königsborn section was completed on 25 May 1984. The Fröndenberg–Unna section is still a non-electrified branch line with a top speed of 60 km/h. To increase speeds, level crossings are being upgraded. It is served only by the Hönnetal-Bahn (RB 54), which continues over the Letmathe–Fröndenberg line via Menden and the Hönne Valley Railway to Neuenrade at 60-minute intervals.

Prior to the closure of the Westphalian line between Welver and Unna-Königsborn in 1968, passenger services were established on the line between Unna and Unna-Königsborn on 26 May 1963, continuing to Dortmund Stadthaus station.

In 1972 a regular interval regional service was established from Unna via Unna-Königsborn, Dortmund Stadthaus and Dortmund-Dorstfeld to Dortmund-Marten Süd, which was extended in 1983 to Dortmund-Lütgendortmund. This was a direct precursor of line S 4 of the Rhine-Ruhr S-Bahn. In preparation for the S-Bahn, electrification of the line from Unna to Unna-Königsborn was completed on 25 May 1984 and on 28 June 1984 it was upgraded with a top speed of 80 km/h. S-Bahn services commenced on 3 June 1984 and operates at 20-minute intervals.

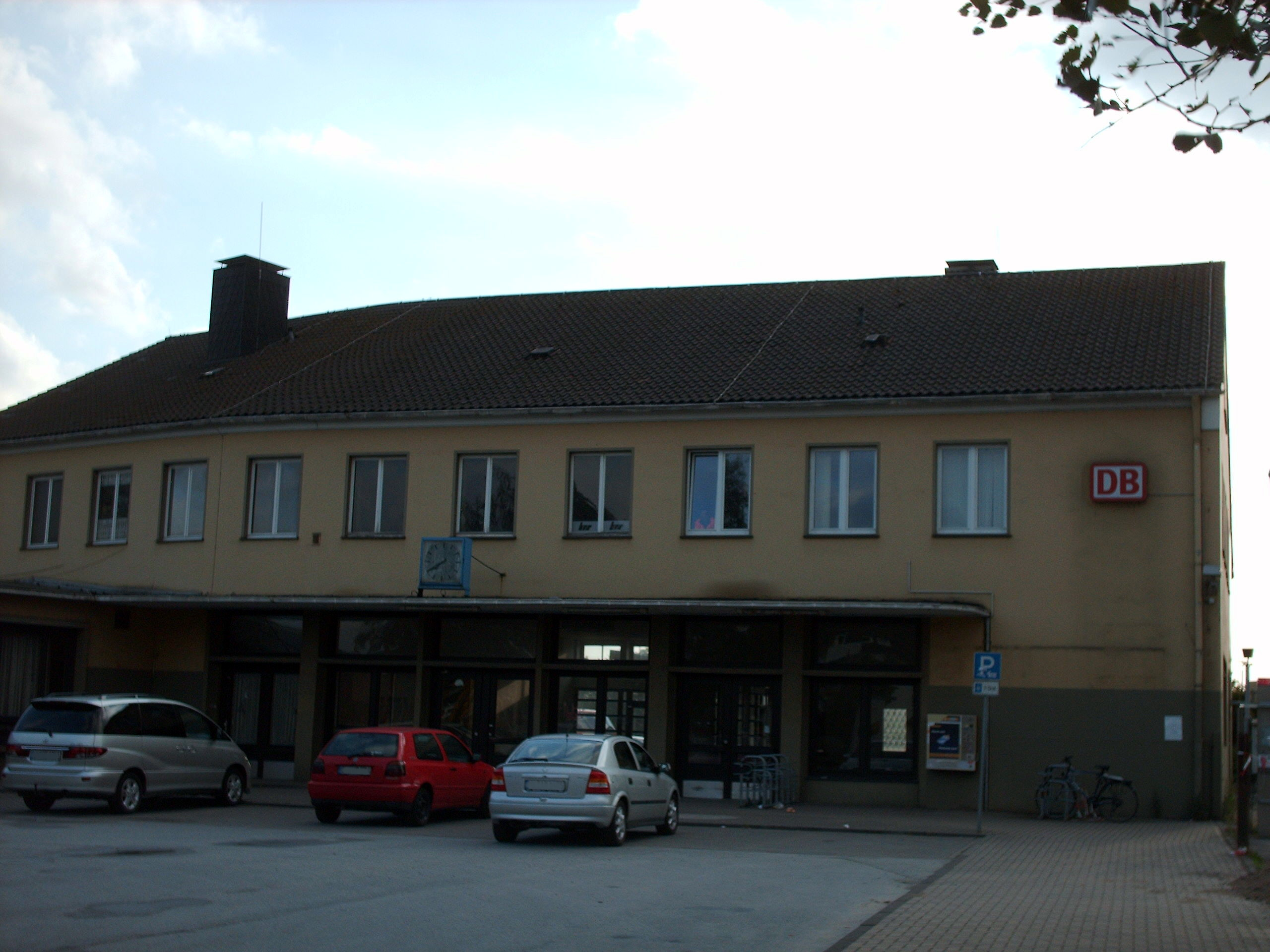
Fröndenberg station

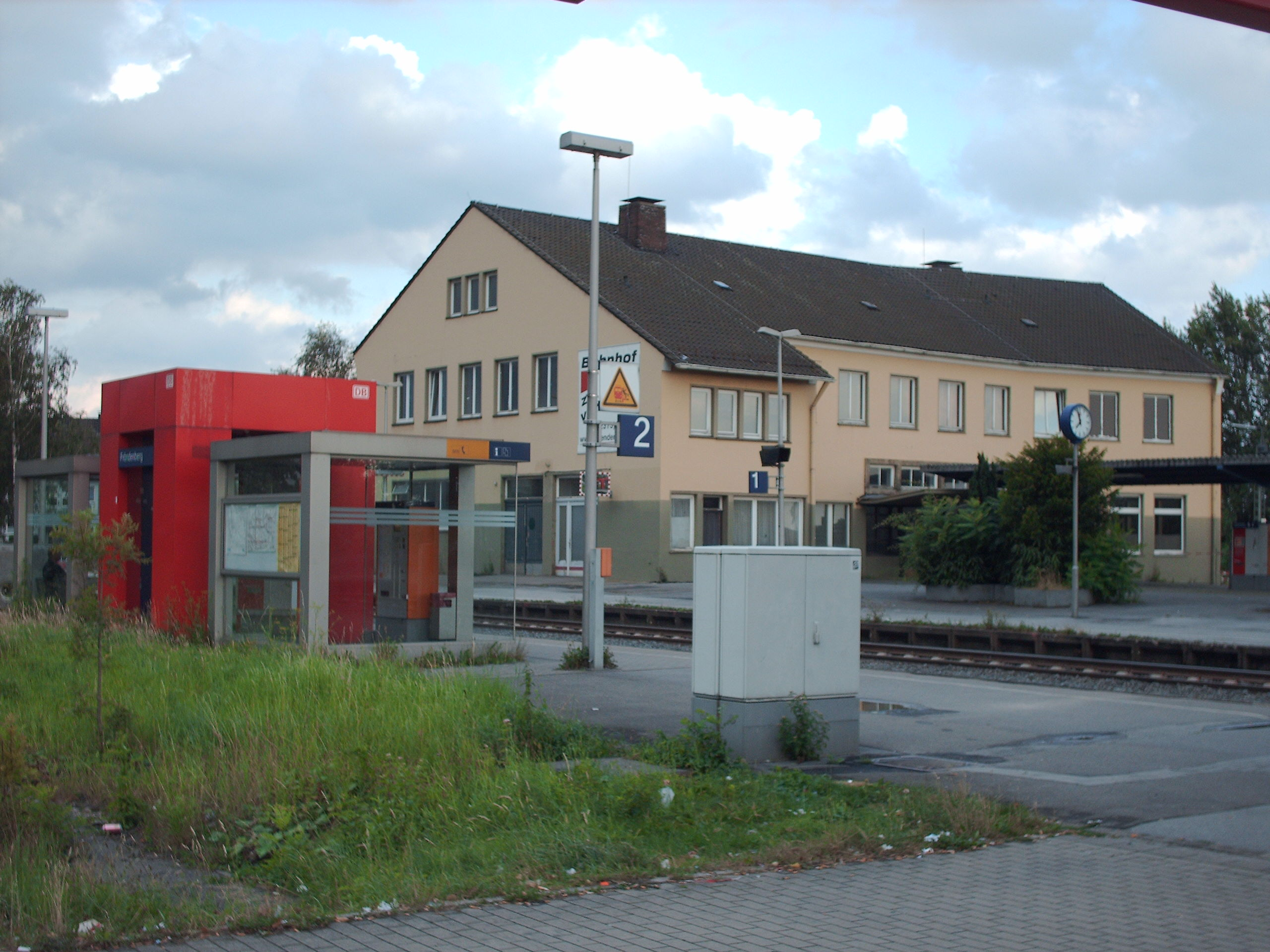
Fröndenberg station

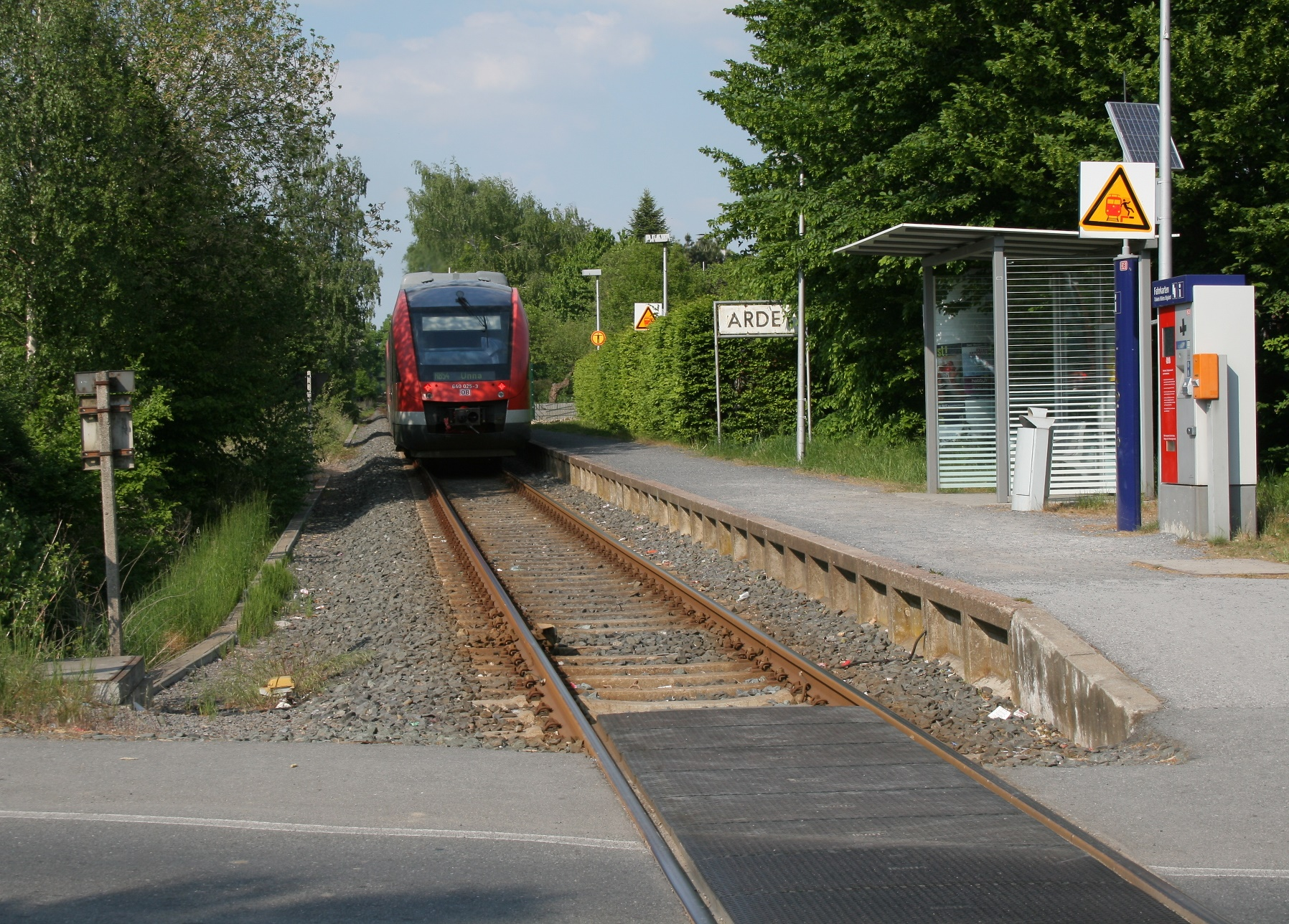
Ardey station

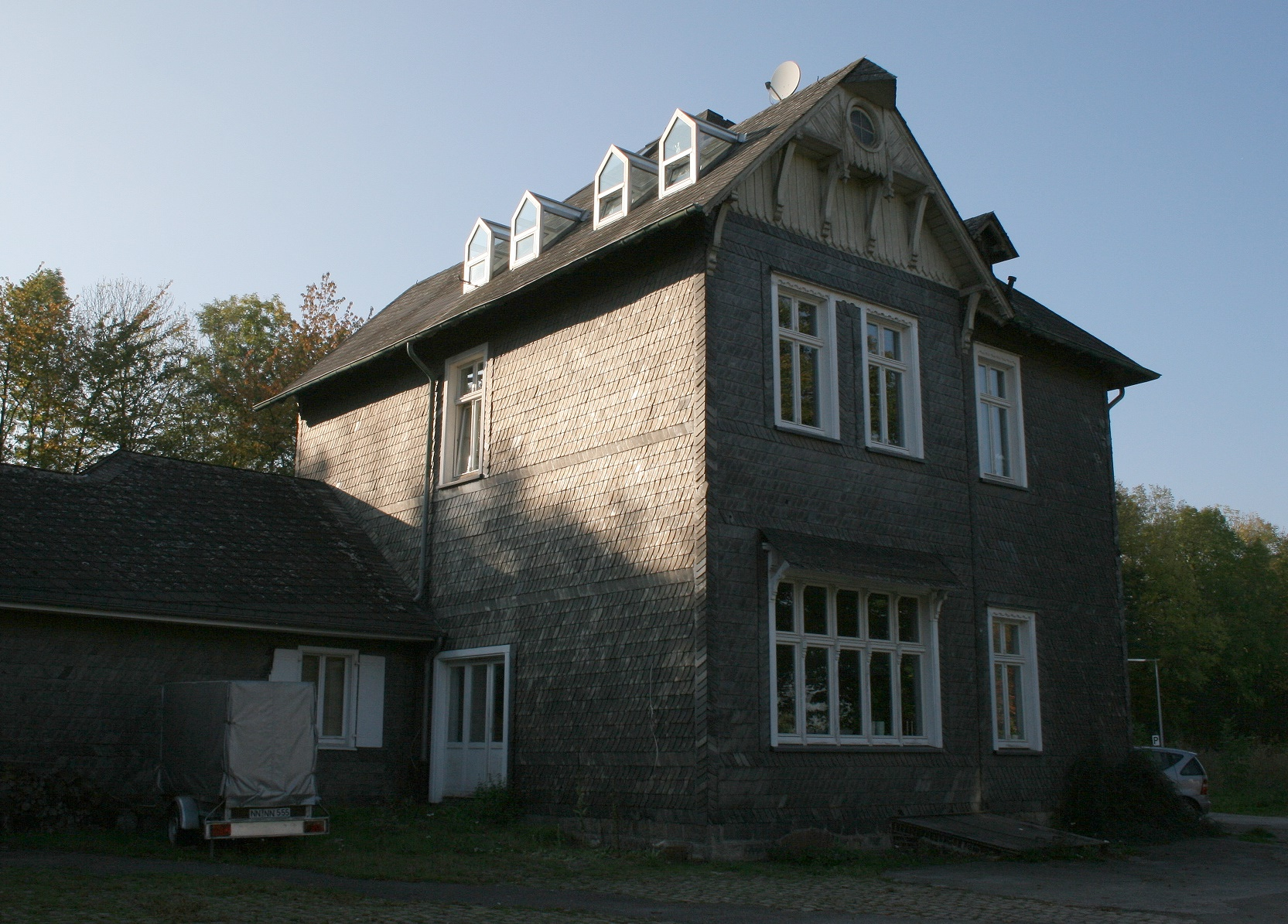
Former Frömern station building

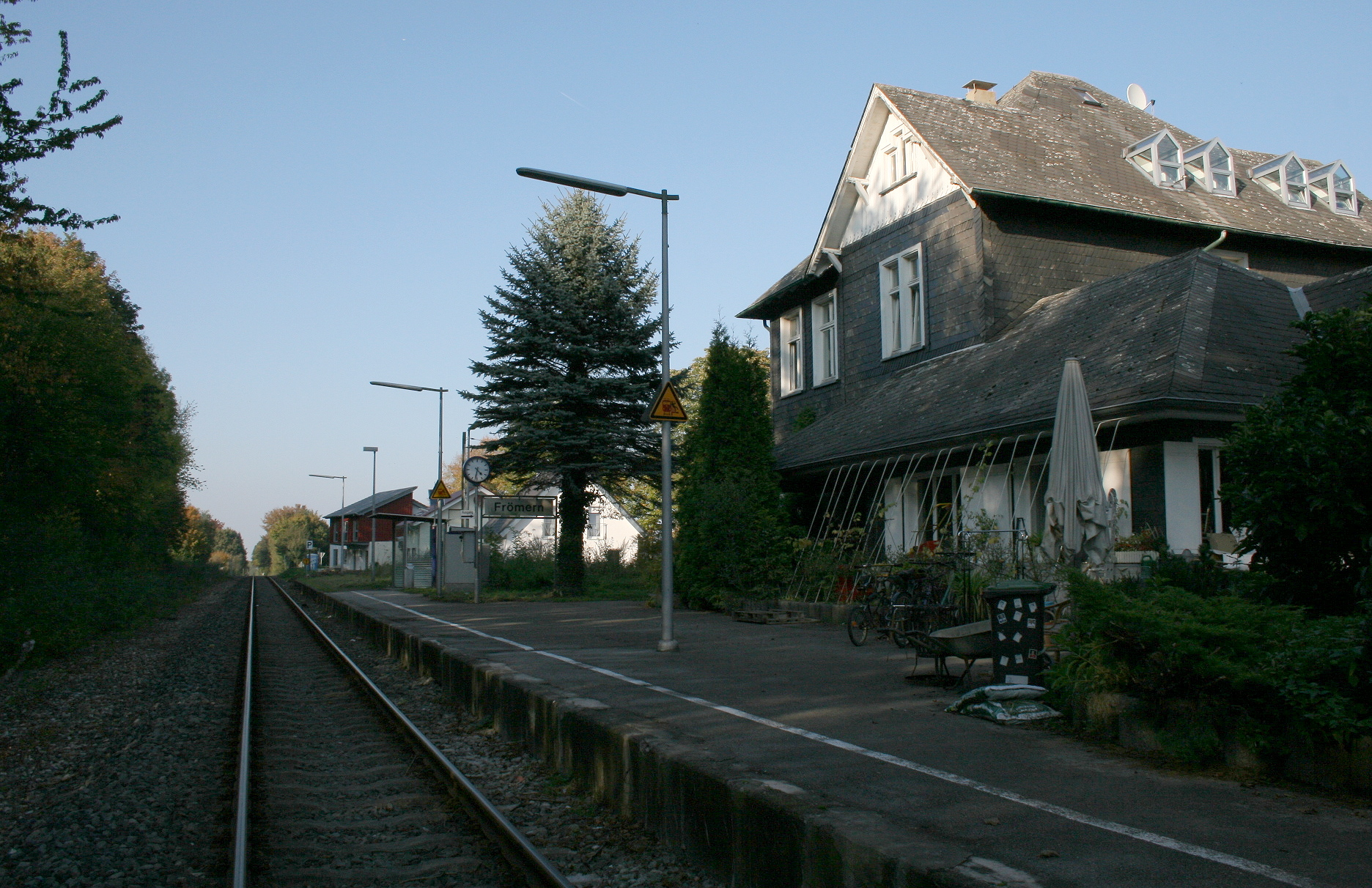
Frömern station

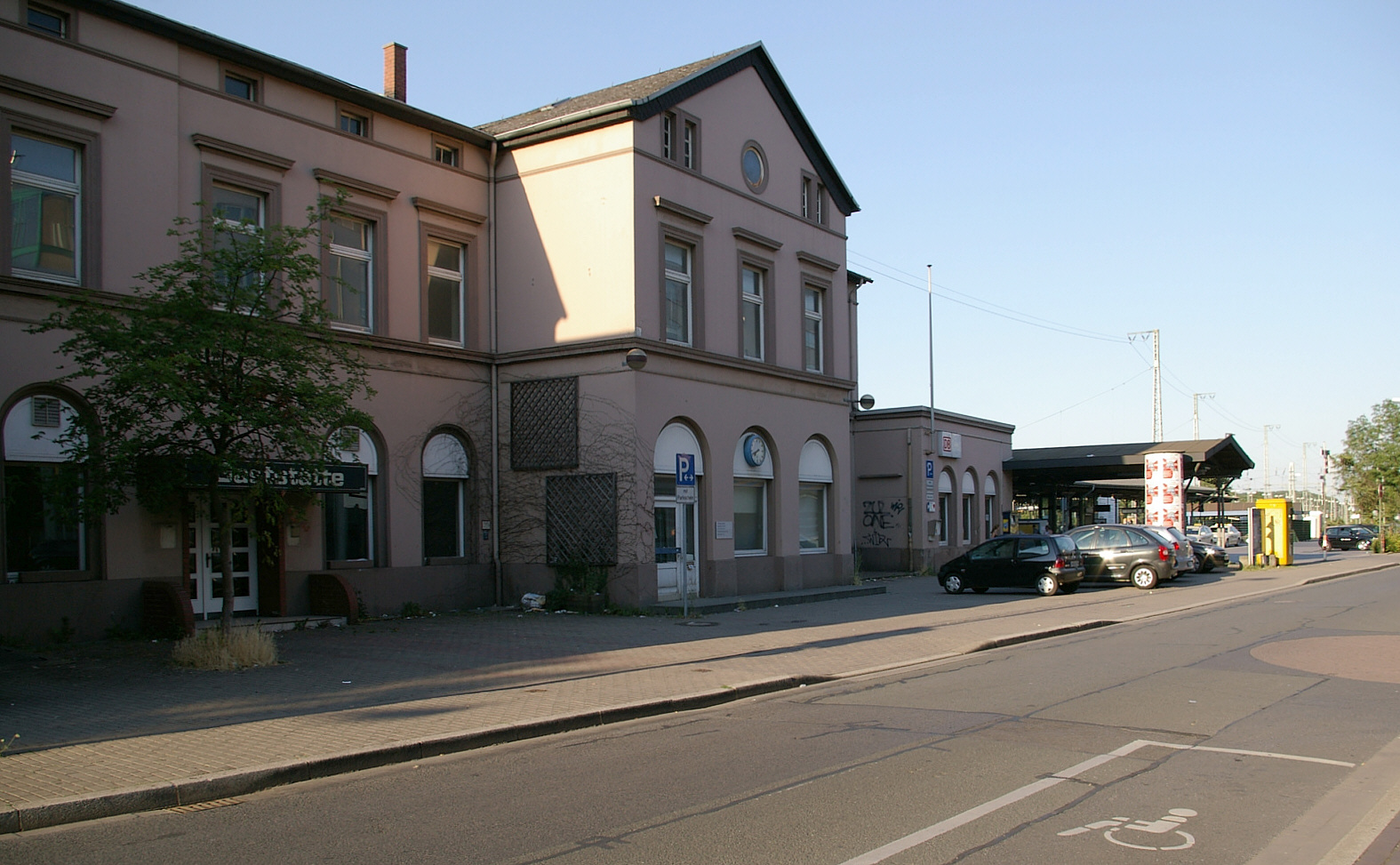
Unna station before renovation in 2007/2008

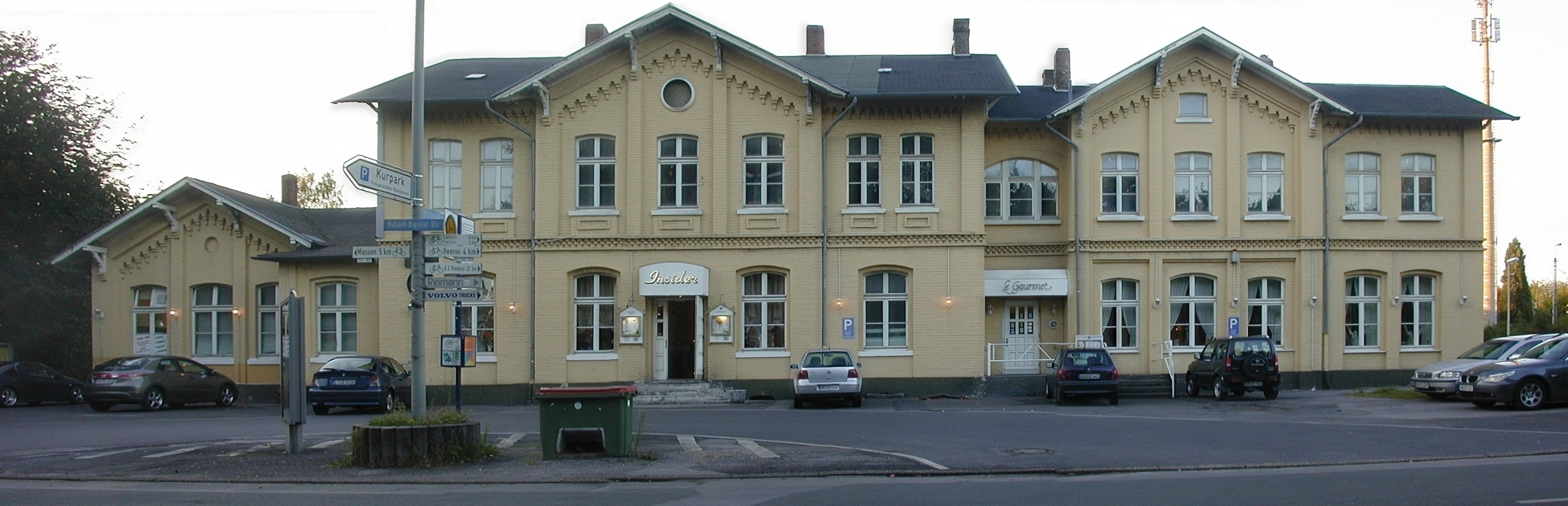
Unna-Königsborn station

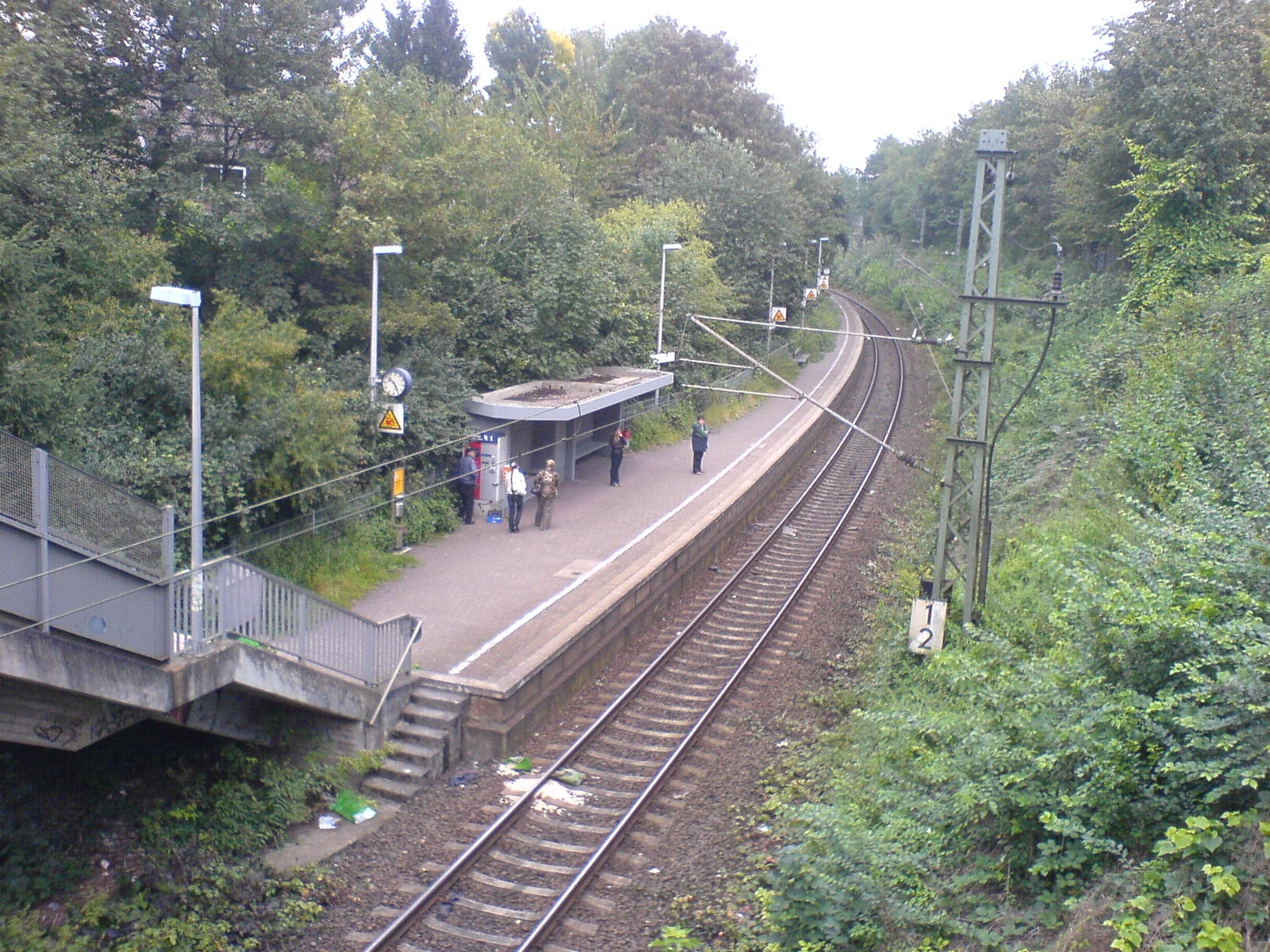
Unna-West station

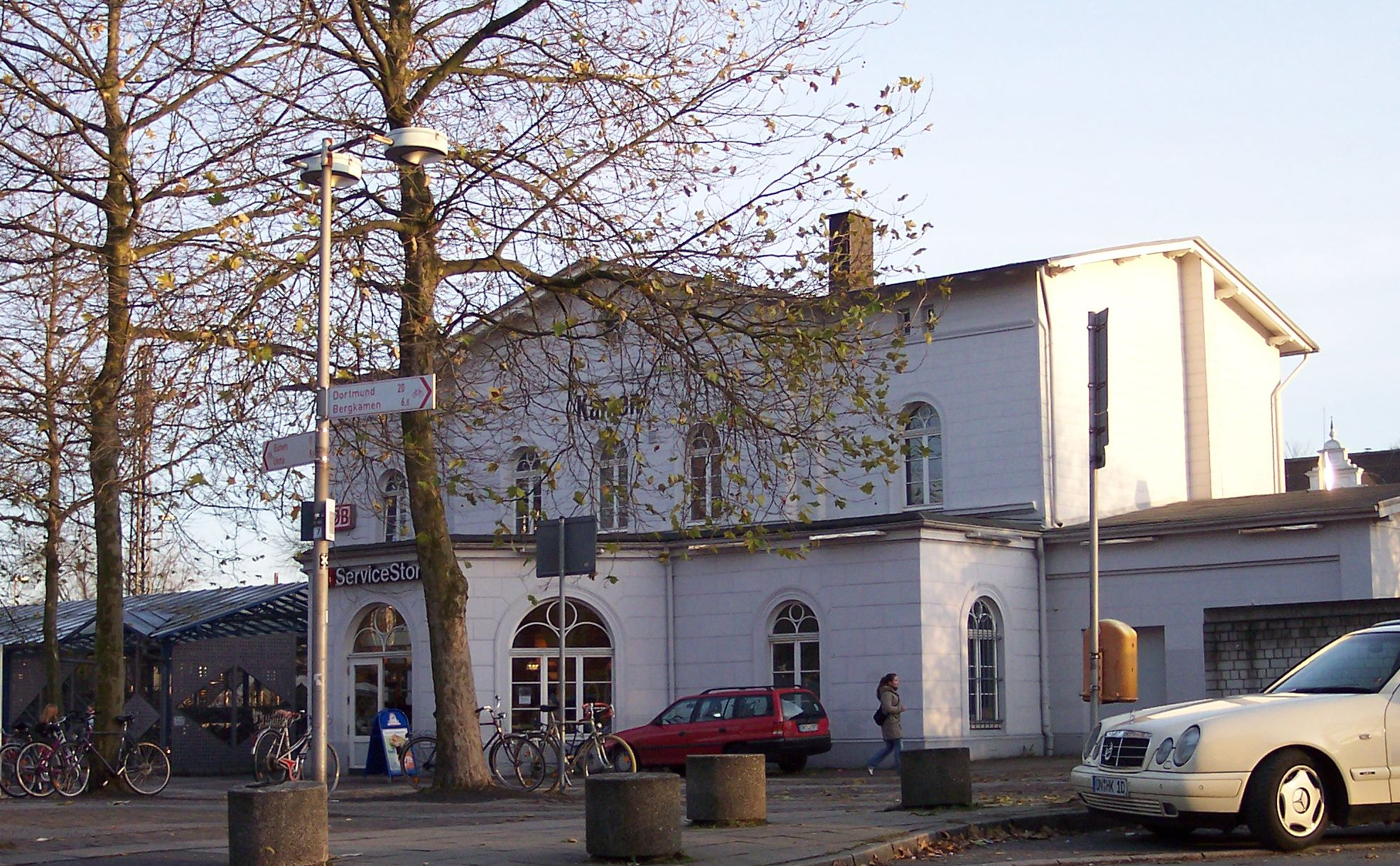
Kamen station

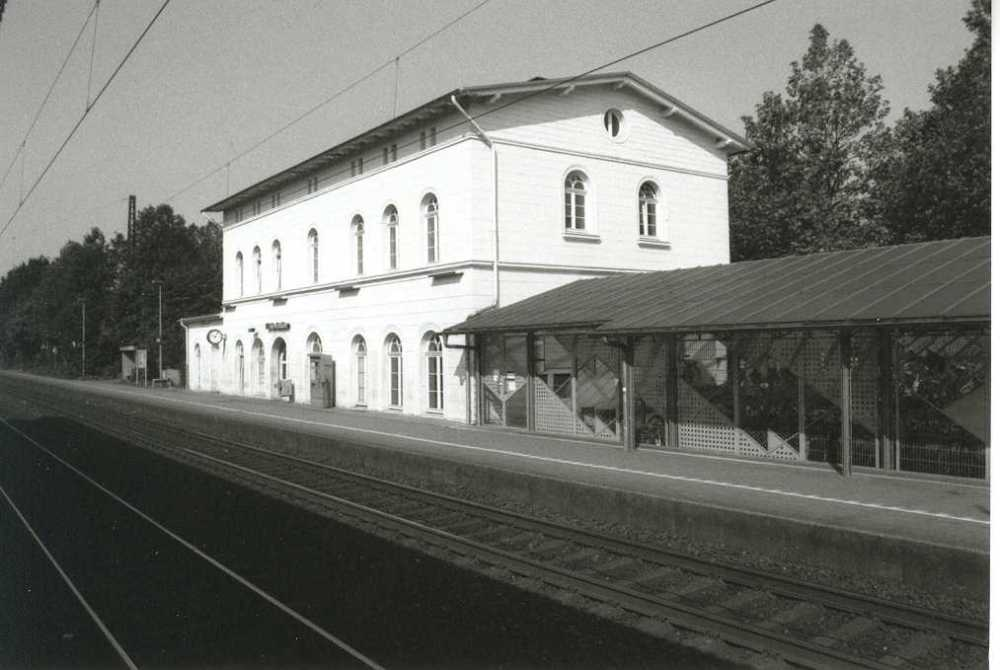
Kamen station platforms
