= Dortmund Knappschaftskrankenhaus station =

Railway station in Dortmund, Germany

Dortmund Knappschaftskrankenhaus
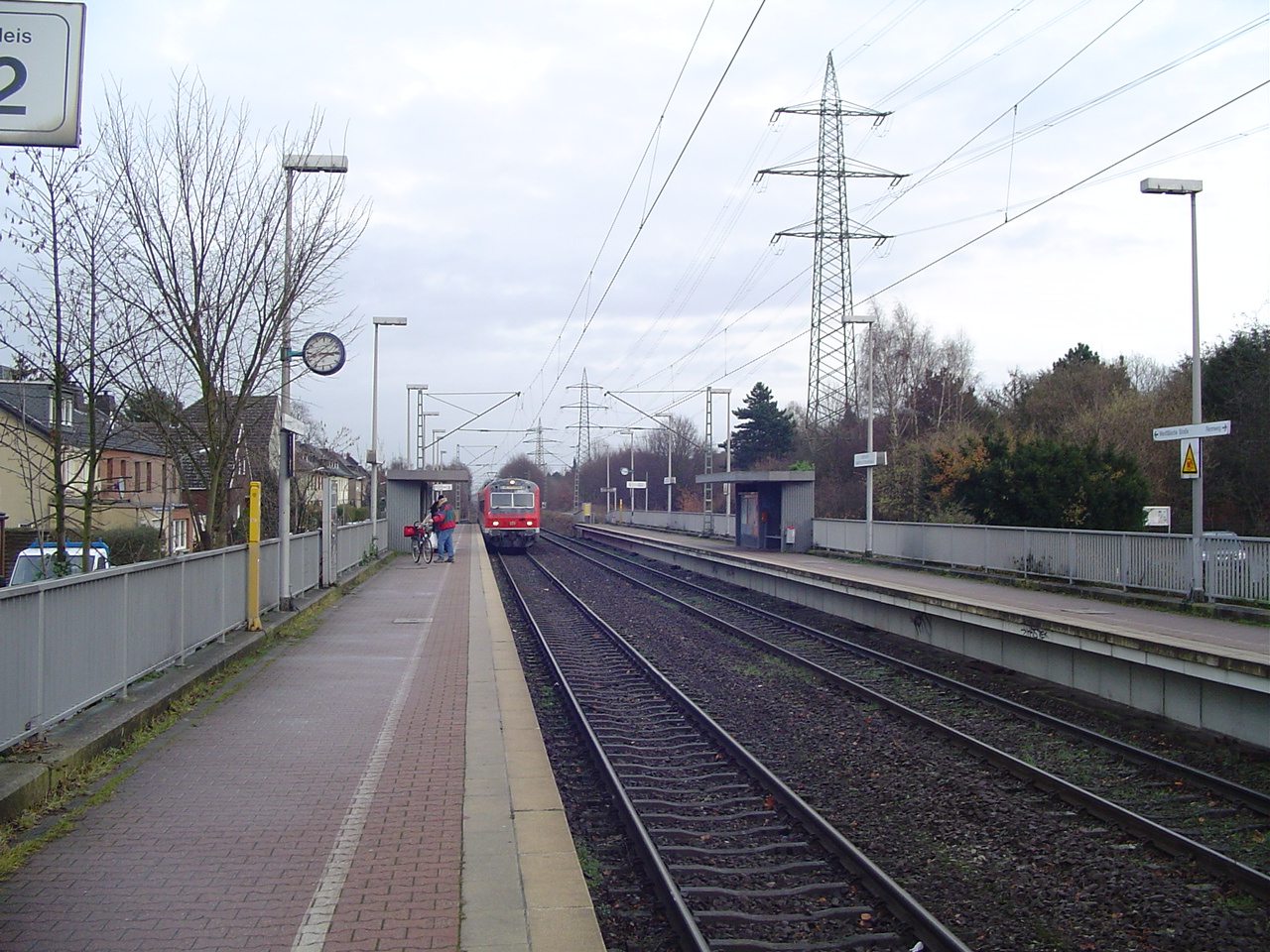

General information
- Location: Dortmund, NRW; Germany
- Coordinates: 51°31′07″N 7°32′15″E
- Lines: Unna–Dortmund (KBS 450.4)
- Platforms: 2

Construction
- Accessible: Yes

Other information
- Station code: 1290
- DS100 code: EDKK
- IBNR: 8001517
- Category: 6
- Fare zone: VRR: 384
- Website: www.bahnhof.de

History
- Opened: 26 May 1963

Services
Preceding station	Rhine-Ruhr S-Bahn	Following station
DO-Körne towards DO-Lütgendortmund	S4	DO-Brackel towards Unna
Location

Dortmund Knappschaftskrankenhaus is a railway station in the Dortmund district of Brackel in the German state of North Rhine-Westphalia near the Knappschaftskrankenhaus (literally "miners' hospital"). It is classified by Deutsche Bahn as a category 6 station. It was opened on 26 May 1963 on the Welver–Sterkrade railway completed between Welver and the old Dortmund Süd (south) station by the Royal Westphalian Railway Company on 15 May 1876 and electrified on 25 May 1984.

It is served by Rhine-Ruhr S-Bahn line S 4 at 30-minute intervals (15-minute intervals in the peak between Dortmund-Lütgendortmund and Unna-Königsborn).
