= Dortmund-Brackel station =

Railway station in Dortmund, Germany

Dortmund Brackel
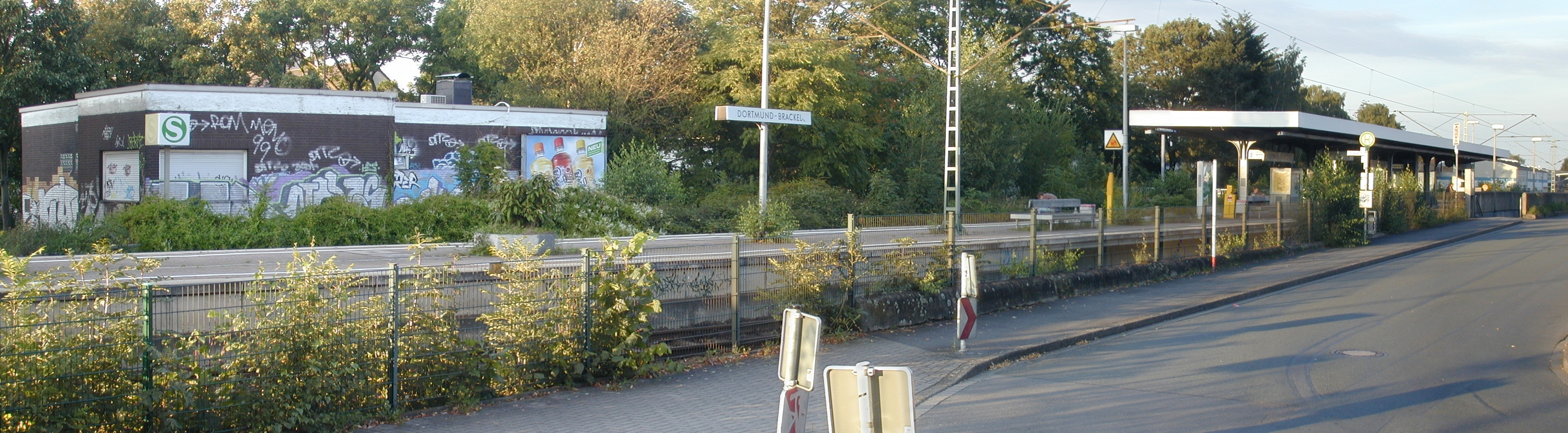

General information
- Location: Dortmund, NRW; Germany
- Coordinates: 51°31′15″N 7°33′00″E
- Lines: Unna–Dortmund (KBS 450.4)
- Platforms: 2

Construction
- Accessible: Yes

Other information
- Station code: 1290
- DS100 code: EDBK
- Category: 5
- Fare zone: VRR: 384
- Website: www.bahnhof.de

History
- Opened: 15 May 1976

Services
Preceding station	Rhine-Ruhr S-Bahn	Following station
DO Knappschaftskrankenhaus towards DO-Lütgendortmund	S4	DO-Asseln Mitte towards Unna
Location

Dortmund-Brackel is a railway station in the Dortmund district of Brackel in the German state of North Rhine-Westphalia. It is classified by Deutsche Bahn as a category 5 station. It was opened on 15 May 1976 on the Welver–Sterkrade railway completed between Welver and the old Dortmund Süd (south) station by the Royal Westphalian Railway Company on the same date and electrified on 25 May 1984. A station building was built in 1895, but it was demolished in 1985.

It is served by Rhine-Ruhr S-Bahn line S 4 at 30-minute intervals (15-minute intervals in the peak between Dortmund-Lütgendortmund and Unna-Königsborn).

The station is also served by two bus routes, 420 (Scharnhorst – Derne + Aplerbeck, every 20 minutes) and 422 (Aplerbeck – Schüren + Wambel – Körne, every 30 minutes) operated by the municipal bus company, Dortmunder Stadtwerke (DSW21).
