= Dortmund-Körne West station =

Railway station in Dortmund, Germany

Dortmund Körne West
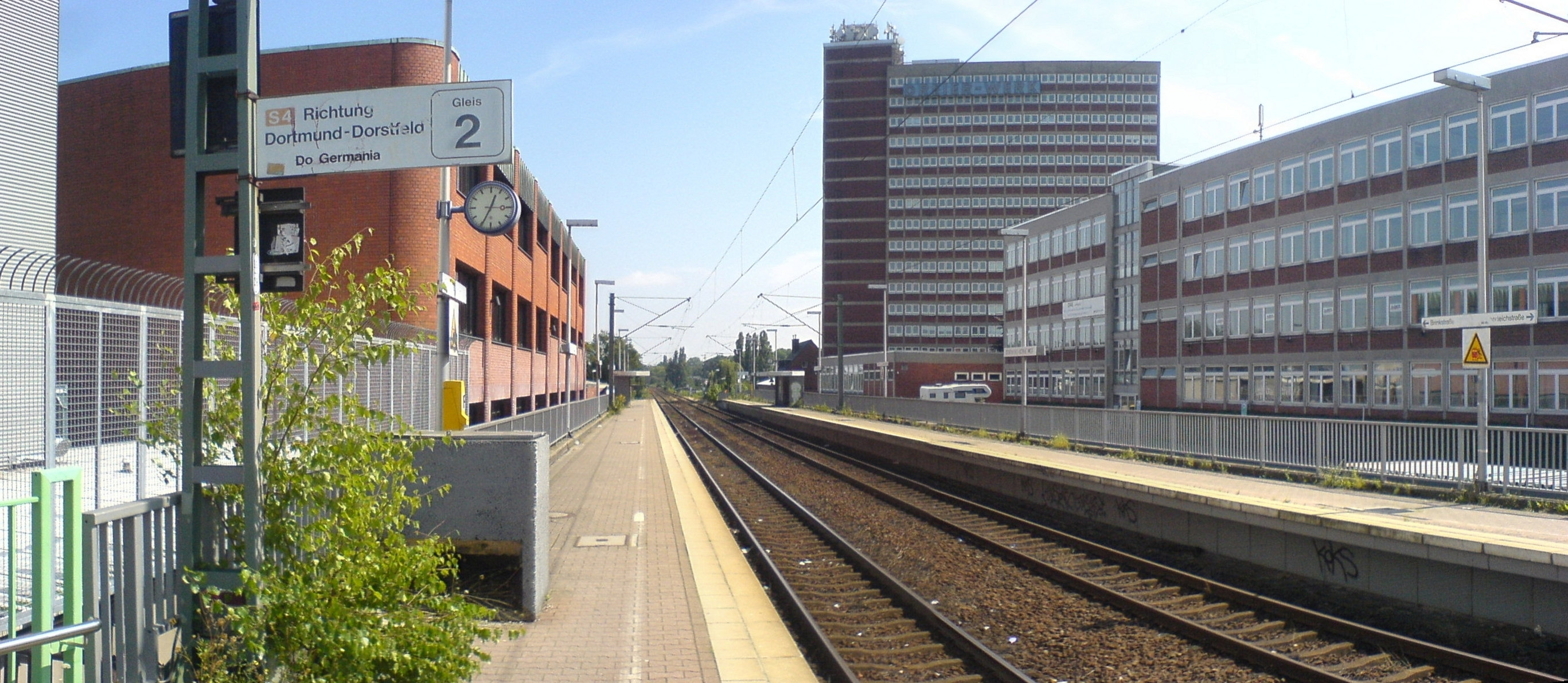

General information
- Location: Berthold-Hof, Dortmund, NRW; Germany
- Coordinates: 51°30′36″N 7°30′08″E
- Lines: Unna–Dortmund (KBS 450.4)
- Platforms: 2

Construction
- Accessible: Yes

Other information
- Station code: 1313
- DS100 code: EDWK
- IBNR: 8003916
- Category: 6
- Fare zone: VRR: 370
- Website: www.bahnhof.de

History
- Opened: 3 June 1984

Services
Preceding station	Rhine-Ruhr S-Bahn	Following station
DO Stadthaus towards DO-Lütgendortmund	S4	DO-Körne towards Unna
Location

Dortmund-Körne West station is a railway station in the Dortmund district of Körne in the German state of North Rhine-Westphalia. It is classified by Deutsche Bahn as a category 6 station. It was opened on 3 June 1984 on the Welver–Sterkrade railway completed between Welver and the old Dortmund Süd (south) station by the Royal Westphalian Railway Company on 15 May 1876 and electrified on 25 May 1984.

It is served by Rhine-Ruhr S-Bahn line S 4 at 30-minute intervals (15-minute intervals in the peak between Dortmund-Lütgendortmund and Unna-Königsborn).

It is also served by bus route 422 (Wambel – Brackel – Aplerbeck – Schüren) every 30 minutes, operated by DSW21.
