= Dortmund-Sölde station =

Railway station in Sölde, Germany

Dortmund Sölde
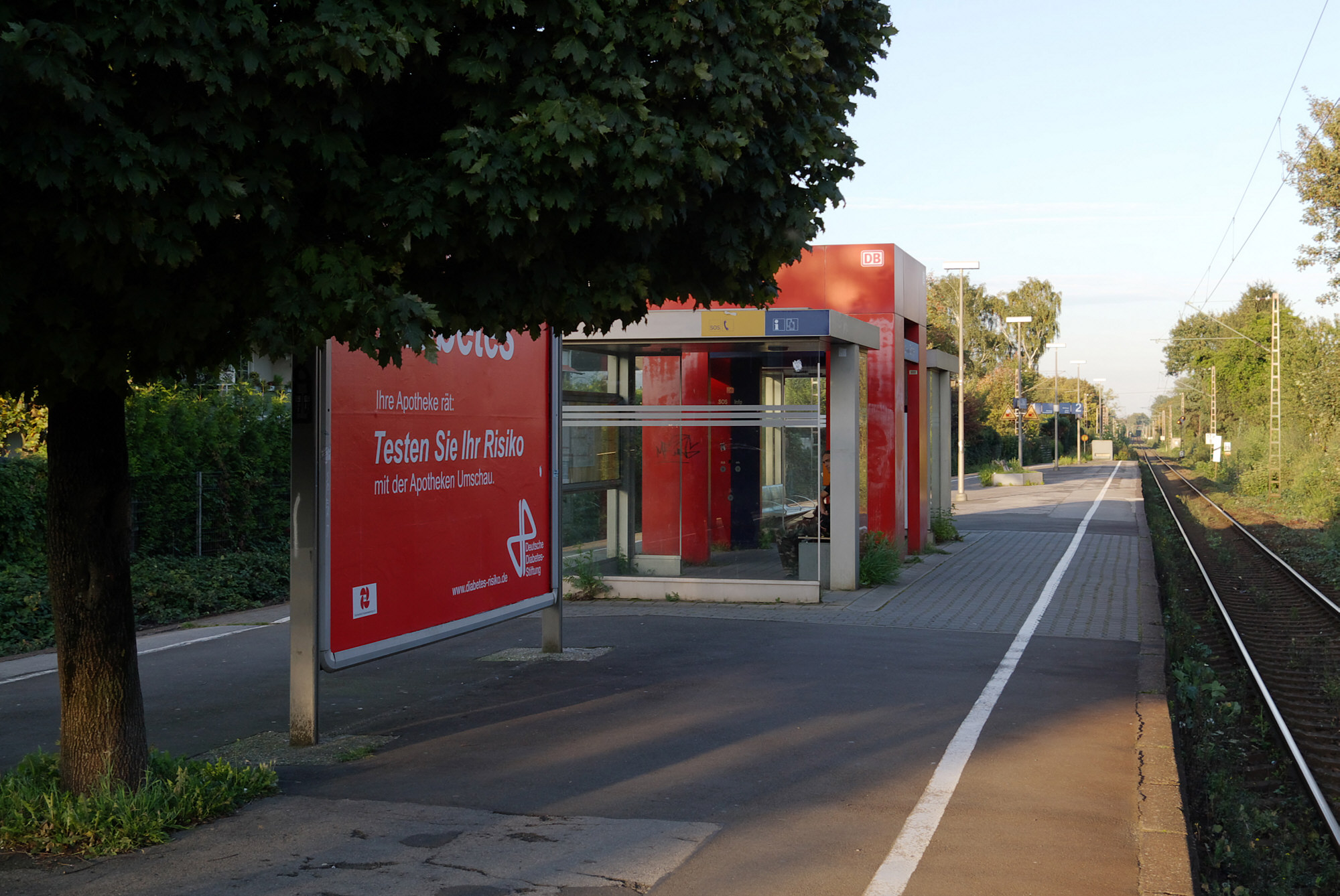
- 2007

General information
- Location: Sölder Straße/Jasminstraße; 44289 Dortmund; NRW, Germany
- Coordinates: 51.4954°N 7.5890°E
- Owner: DB Netz
- Operator: DB Station&Service
- Line: Dortmund–Soest railway
- Platforms: 1 island platform
- Tracks: 2
- Train operators: Eurobahn

Construction
- Accessible: No

Other information
- Station code: 1325
- DS100 code: EDSO
- IBNR: 8001545
- Category: 6
- Fare zone: VRR: 386
- Website: www.bahnhof.de

Services
| Preceding station | | Following station |
|---|---|---|
| Dortmund-Aplerbeck towards Dortmund Hbf | RB 59 | Holzwickede towards Soest |
Location
- Location within North Rhine-Westphalia

Dortmund-Sölde station is a railway station in the Sölde district of the town of Dortmund, located in North Rhine-Westphalia, Germany.

== Rail services ==
| Line | Name | Route |
|---|---|---|
| RB 59 | Hellweg-Bahn | Dortmund Hauptbahnhof – Dortmund-Sölde – Holzwickede – Unna – Soest |
