= Dortmund-Wickede station =

Railway station in Dortmund, Germany

Dortmund Wickede
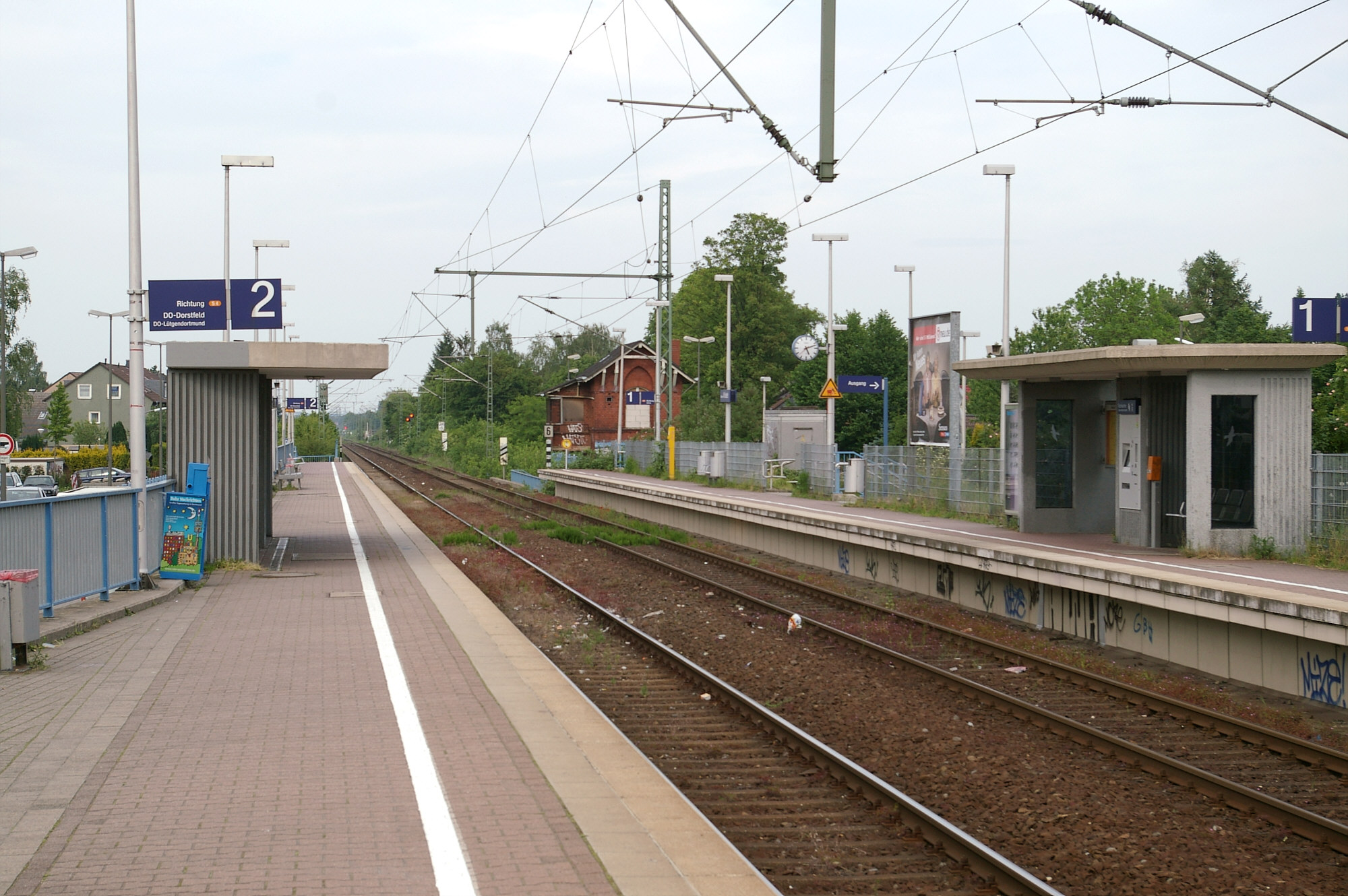
- Dortmund-Wickede station in 2007

General information
- Location: Wickeder Hellweg, Dortmund, NRW; Germany
- Coordinates: 51°32′02″N 7°37′29″E
- Lines: Unna–Dortmund (KBS 450.4)
- Platforms: 2
- Train operators: DB Regio NRW

Construction
- Accessible: Yes

Other information
- Station code: 1327
- DS100 code: EDWI
- IBNR: 8001546
- Category: 6
- Fare zone: VRR: 384
- Website: www.bahnhof.de

History
- Opened: 26 May 1963

Services
Preceding station	Rhine-Ruhr S-Bahn	Following station
DO-Wickede West towards DO-Lütgendortmund	S4	Massen towards Unna
Preceding station	Rhine-Ruhr Stadtbahn	Following station
Dollersweg towards Wittener Straße	U43	Terminus
Location

Dortmund-Wickede is a railway station in the Dortmund district of Wickede in the German state of North Rhine-Westphalia. It is classified by Deutsche Bahn as a category 6 station. It was opened on 26 May 1963 on the Welver–Sterkrade railway completed between Welver and the old Dortmund Süd (south) station by the Royal Westphalian Railway Company on 15 May 1876 and electrified on 25 May 1984.

It is served by Rhine-Ruhr S-Bahn line S4 at 20-minute intervals. It is also served by Dortmund Stadtbahn line U43 at 20-minute intervals.

The station is also served by bus route R51 (Massen - Unna + Holzwickede - Opherdicke), operated by the Verkehrsgesellschaft Kreis Unna, at 60-minute intervals.
