= Unna West station =

Railway station in Germany

Unna West
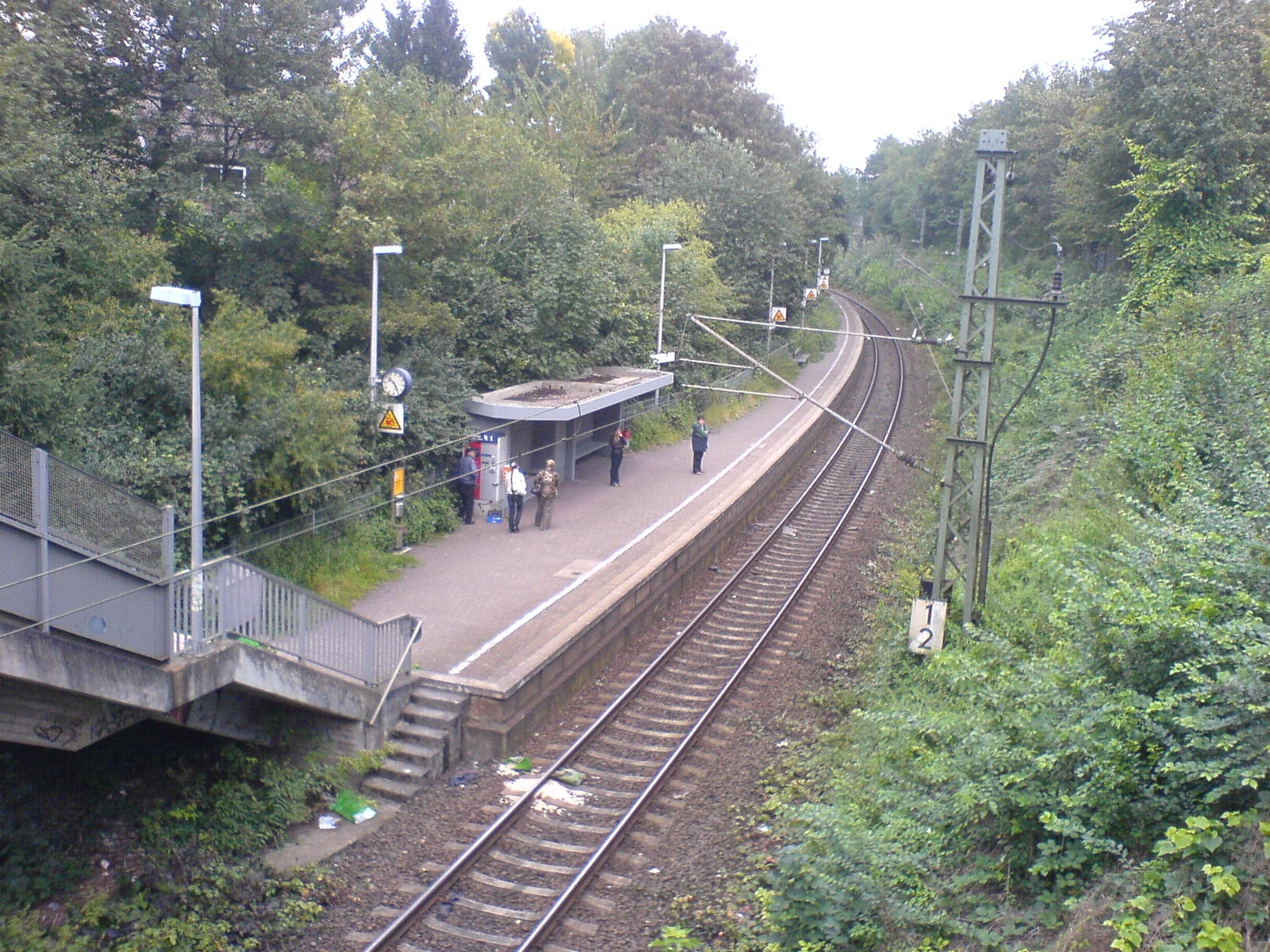

General information
- Location: Mühlenstr., Unna, NRW; Germany
- Coordinates: 51°32′20″N 7°40′33″E
- Owner: DB Netz
- Operator: DB Station&Service
- Lines: Unna–Dortmund (KBS 450.4)
- Platforms: 1
- Train operators: DB Regio NRW

Construction
- Accessible: No

Other information
- Station code: 6336
- DS100 code: EUNW
- IBNR: 8003925
- Category: 6
- Fare zone: Westfalentarif: 42491
- Website: www.bahnhof.de

History
- Opened: 3 June 1984

Services
Preceding station	Rhine-Ruhr S-Bahn	Following station
Unna-Königsborn towards DO-Lütgendortmund	S4	Unna Terminus
Location
- Location within North Rhine-Westphalia

Unna West is a railway station in the Unna district of Massen in the German state of North Rhine-Westphalia. It is classified by Deutsche Bahn as a category 6 station. It was opened on 3 June 1984 on the Fröndenberg–Kamen railway completed between Unna and Unna-Königsborn by the Prussian state railways on 1 April 1900 and electrified on 25 May 1984.

It is served by Rhine-Ruhr S-Bahn line S 4 at 30-minute intervals.

The station is also served by bus routes C41 (Unna + Massen - Holzwickede - Dortmund Airport) and R51 (Unna + Massen - Wickede - Holzwickede - Opherdicke) of Verkehrsgesellschaft Kreis Unna, both at 60-minute intervals.
