= Massen station =

Railway station in Germany

Massen
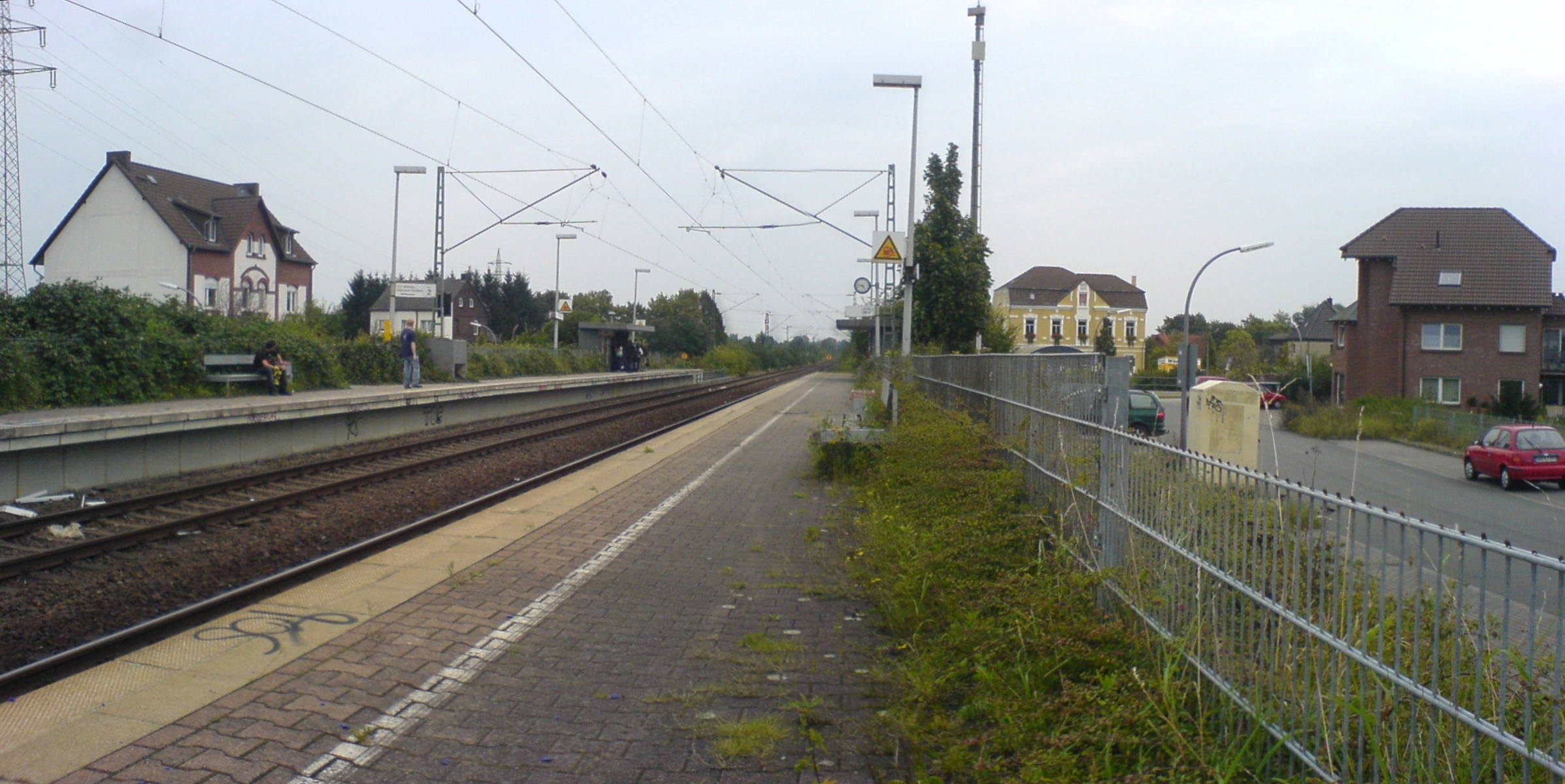

General information
- Location: Massener Bahnhofstr., Unna, NRW; Germany
- Coordinates: 51°32′29″N 7°38′34″E
- Lines: Unna–Dortmund (KBS 450.4)
- Platforms: 2
- Train operators: DB Regio NRW

Construction
- Accessible: Yes

Other information
- Station code: 3997
- DS100 code: EMAN
- IBNR: 8003909
- Category: 6
- Fare zone: Westfalentarif: 42496
- Website: www.bahnhof.de

History
- Opened: 1897/1905

Services
Preceding station	Rhine-Ruhr S-Bahn	Following station
Dortmund-Wickede towards DO-Lütgendortmund	S4	Unna-Königsborn towards Unna
Location

Massen is a railway station in the Unna district of Massen in the German state of North Rhine-Westphalia. It is classified by Deutsche Bahn as a category 6 station. It was opened between 1897 and 1905 on the Welver–Sterkrade railway completed between Welver and the old Dortmund Süd (south) station by the Royal Westphalian Railway Company on 15 May 1876 and electrified on 25 May 1984.

It is served by Rhine-Ruhr S-Bahn line S 4 at 30-minute intervals (15-minute intervals in the peak between Dortmund-Lütgendortmund and Unna-Königsborn).

The station is also served by bus routes T48 (Mittelstr + Afferde) and R54 (Unna + Methler) of Verkehrsgesellschaft Kreis Unna, both at 60-minute intervals.
