= Wickede (Dortmund) =

Part of Brackel, an urban district of Dortmund, Germany

Coordinates: 51.5319°N 7.6108°E

Location of Wickede in Dortmund and in the District Brackel

Wickede (German pronunciation: [ˈvɪkədə]) is the easternmost borough in the city of Dortmund, Germany.

Until 1830 Wickede was a village with a purely peasant population. With the beginning of industrialization Wickede's population grew. Today it has 15,398 inhabitants, which makes it one of the more populous boroughs of Dortmund.

Wickede was incorporated into Dortmund in 1928. Today it is a part of the Stadtbezirk ("City District") Brackel and it borders the towns of Unna and Holzwickede. The borough is also home to the Dortmund Airport.

Some areas of Wickede are considered socially disadvantaged. The overall unemployment rate of the borough is slightly higher than in the city as a whole and the average annual income is slightly lower than the city's average.

Wickede is connected to the city center through light rail and has two railway stations (see Dortmund-Wickede station and Dortmund-Wickede West station).
