= Holzwickede station =

Railway station in Holzwickede, Germany

Holzwickede
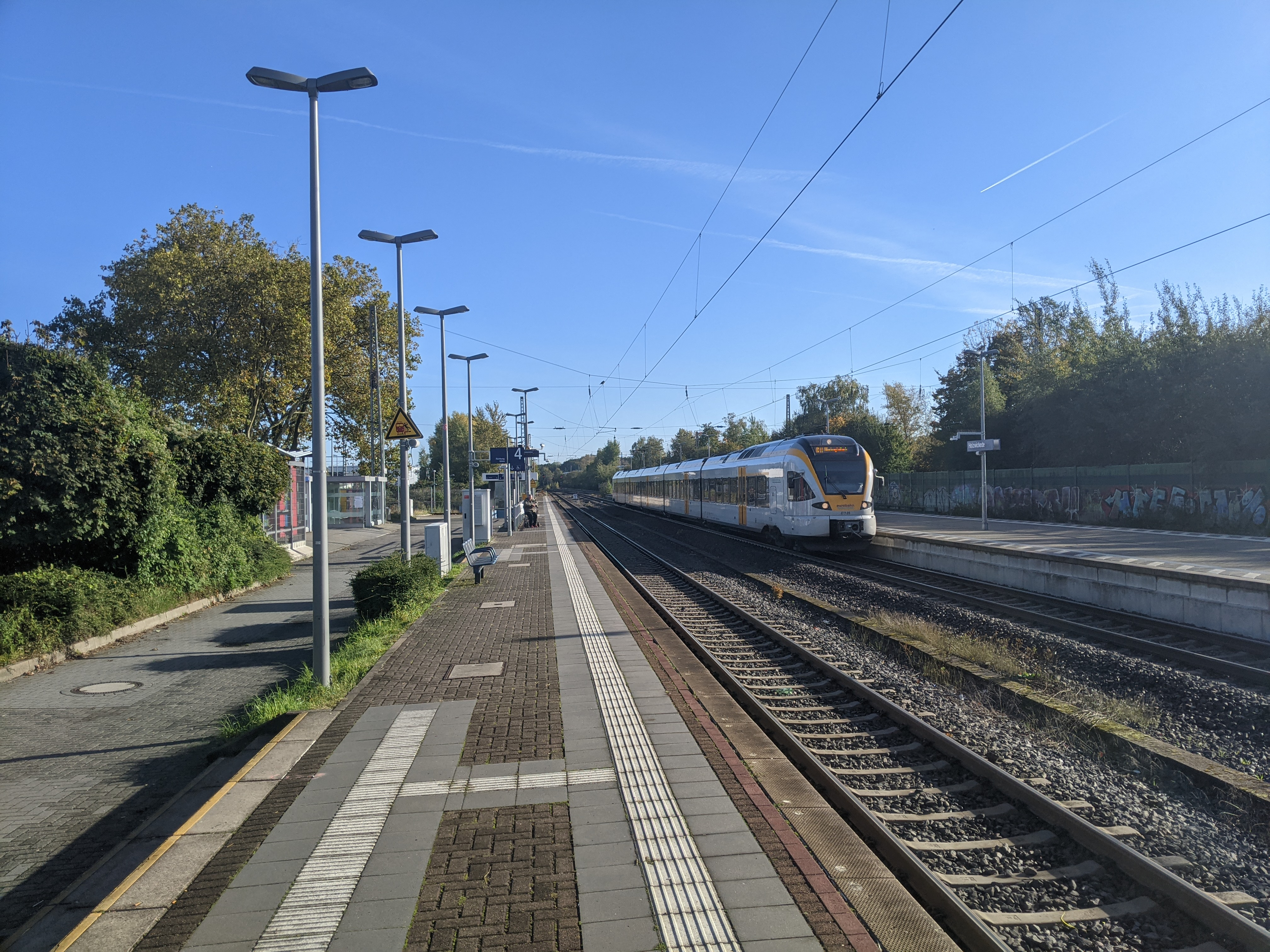
- 2024

General information
- Location: Holzwickede, NRW; Germany
- Coordinates: 51°30′17″N 7°37′09″E
- Owner: DB Netz
- Operator: DB Station&Service
- Lines: Hagen–Hamm (KBS 455); Dortmund-Soest (KBS 431)
- Platforms: 4, 1 island platform 2 side platforms
- Train operators: Eurobahn; National Express Germany

Construction
- Accessible: Yes

Other information
- Station code: 2890
- DS100 code: EHZW
- IBNR: 8000092
- Category: 5
- Fare zone: Westfalentarif: 42481
- Website: www.bahnhof.de

History
- Opened: 1 April 1867

Services
| Preceding station | | Following station |
|---|---|---|
| Schwerte (Ruhr) towards Venlo | RE 13 | Unna towards Hamm (Westf) Hbf |
| Dortmund-Sölde towards Dortmund Hbf | RB 59 | Unna towards Soest |
| Preceding station | National Express Germany | Following station |
| Schwerte (Ruhr) towards Krefeld Hbf | RE 7 (Rhein-Münsterland-Express) | Unna towards Rheine |
Location
- Location within North Rhine-Westphalia

Holzwickede station is a through station in the town of Holzwickede in the German state of North Rhine-Westphalia. The station was opened on 17 December 1860, five years after the opening of the Dortmund–Soest railway. It has five platform tracks and it is classified by Deutsche Bahn as a category 4 station.

The station is served by the Rhein-Münsterland-Express (RE 7) between Krefeld and Rheine, the Maas-Wupper-Express (RE 13) between Venlo and Hamm and the Hellwegbahn (RB 59) between Dortmund and Soest, each hourly.

== Dortmund Airport ==
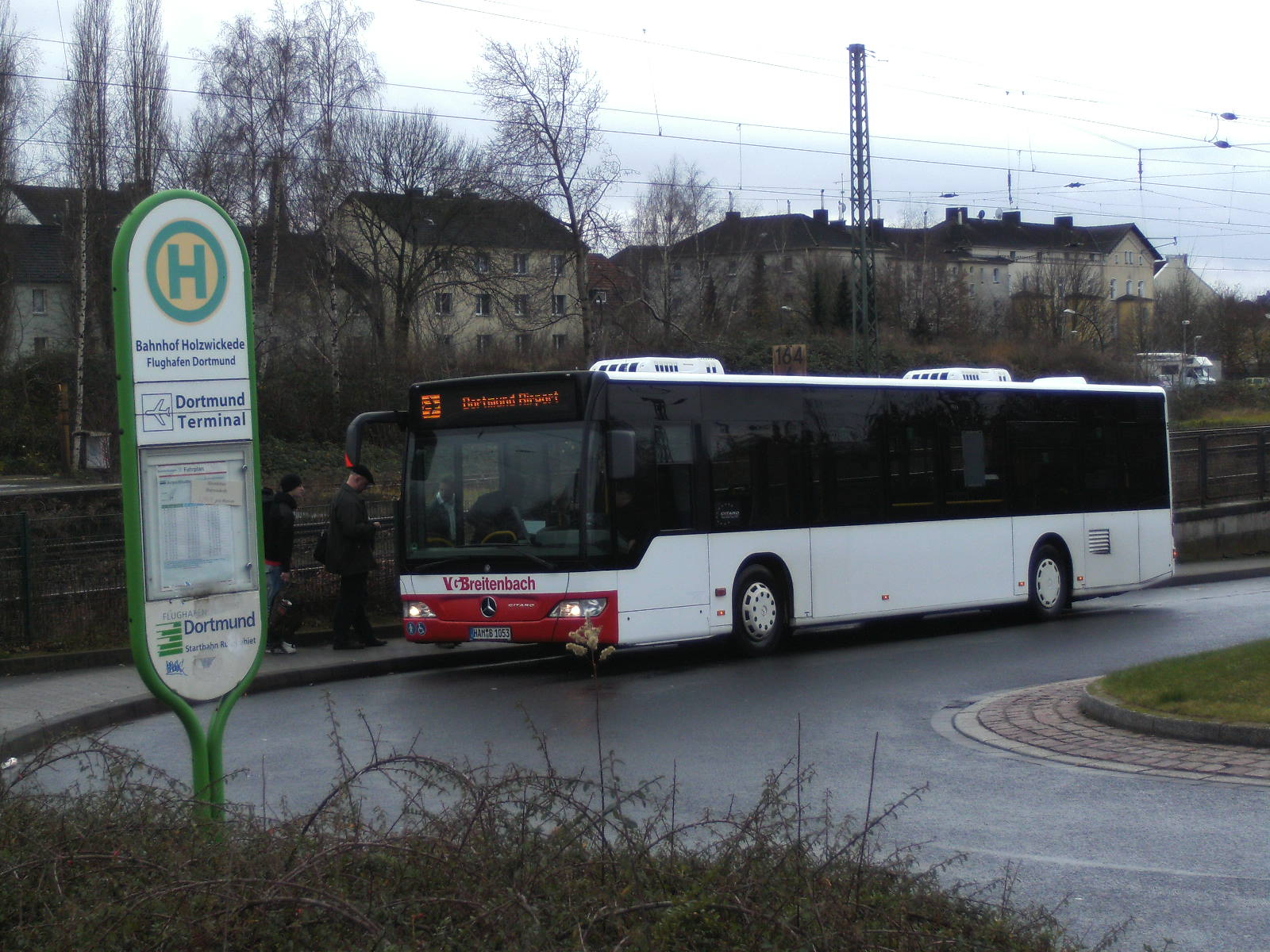
Airport shuttle bus at Holzwickede station (2009).

Dortmund Airport is located within a walking distance in the north of the station. There is a shuttle bus service connecting the station and the airport.

== History ==
The station was opened in 1860. In 1867, the railway to Schwerte (now part of the Hagen-Hamm railway) was opened. By this time, the number of tracks in the rail yard had grown to two. The station building was expanded in 1873 and further in 1899. In 1911 a pedestrian bridge was built. The station suffered much damage in 1945 at the end of the World War. The services at the stations were run down just prior to the electrifying of the railway from Cologne to Hamm in 1964. in 1994, the station building was demolished. Since 2007, the station is unstaffed. in 2008, eurobahn took over the operation of trains from Dortmund to Soest. In 2011, a new pedestrian bridge was built.

| Line | Line name | Service | Route |
|---|---|---|---|
| RE 7 | Rhein-Münsterland-Express | (Rheine –) Münster – Hamm – Unna – Holzwickede – Hagen – Wuppertal – Solingen – Cologne – Krefeld | 60 min |
| RE 13 | Maas-Wupper-Express | Hamm – Unna – Holzwickede – Hagen – Wuppertal – Düsseldorf – Mönchengladbach – Venlo | 60 min |
| RB 59 | Hellwegbahn | Dortmund – Holzwickede – Soest | 60 min |
