= Dortmund–Hamm railway =

Railway line in Germany

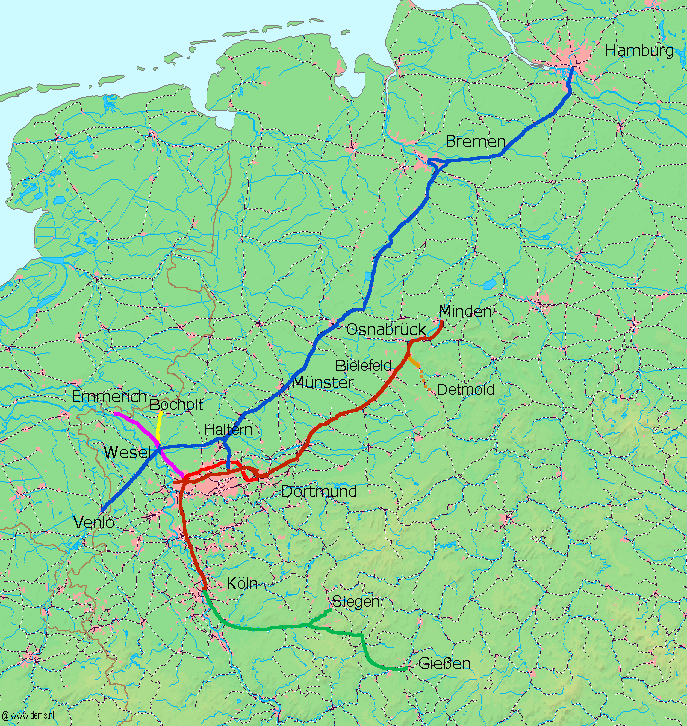
- Cologne-Minden trunk line in dark red

Overview
- Line number: 2650
- Locale: North Rhine-Westphalia, Germany

Service
- Route number: 415, 416

Technical
- Line length: 31 km (19 mi)
- Track gauge: 1,435 mm (4 ft 8 1/2 in) standard gauge
- Electrification: 15 kV/16.7 Hz AC Overhead catenary
- Operating speed: 200 km/h (120 mph)

The Dortmund–Hamm Railway is an important and historically significant railway in Germany. It is a major axis for long distance passenger and freight trains between the Ruhr and the north and east of Germany. It is the part of the trunk line built by the Cologne-Minden Railway Company (German, old spelling: Cöln-Mindener Eisenbahn-Gesellschaft, CME) from Köln Deutz to Minden. It was opened in 1847 and has been modernized and developed several times since then.

== History ==
On 18 December 1843, the Prussian government granted a concession to the CME for the line, which began at what was then the CME station in Deutz (now a suburb of Cologne) with the construction of the first section to Düsseldorf, which was opened on 20 December 1845. Only a few weeks later, on 9 February 1846, the second section was completed to a temporary terminus at the site of present-day Duisburg Hauptbahnhof called the Cologne-Minden railway station, the first of three train stations built at the same place. The route of the next section to Oberhausen, Altenessen, Gelsenkirchen, Wanne, Herne and Dortmund to Hamm was chosen over a route close to the coal mines that were then located on the north bank of the Ruhr because it was cheaper to build as it largely avoided hills. Nevertheless, it still took well over a year until 15 May 1847 for this section to be completed and put into operation. On 15 October 1847 the last section was opened to Minden, thus completing the entire 263 kilometre long, single track railway. On the same day the Royal Hanoverian State Railways opened its Hanover-Minden Railway, completing a connection to Berlin and northeastern Germany.

== Development ==
The railway line between Dortmund and Hamm has been continually modernized since its opening reflecting its growing importance as an east-west link. It is now at least double track and was electrified in the late 1950s over its entire length. In 1986, a 20.1 kilometre long section between Nordbögge (near Hamm) and Dortmund was cleared for scheduled operations at 200 km/h.

Since the beginning of the 1990s, trains have been permitted to operate in this section over its remaining level crossings at more than 160 km. Meanwhile, some of the crossings have been replaced by over or underpasses. Between the 120.4 and 143.4 km marks, the German train protection system, Linienzugbeeinflussung has been installed.

== Services ==
There are hourly Intercity-Express train services on ICE line 10 from Cologne via Duisburg, Essen, Hannover to Berlin and other InterCity or ICE trains run on the line.

Regional-Express trains run at hourly intervals on four lines: RE 1: NRW-Express (Hamm–Aachen, half starting or finishing in Paderborn), RE 3: Rhein-Emscher-Express (Hamm–Düsseldorf), and RE 6: Rhein-Weser-Express (Minden–Hamm–Düsseldorf) and RE 11: Rhein-Hellweg-Express (Hamm–Mönchengladbach). RE 6 trains only stop at Kamen and RE 11 trains only stop at Kamen and Kamen-Methler between Hamm and Dortmund.
