= Kamen station =

Railway station in Germany

Kamen
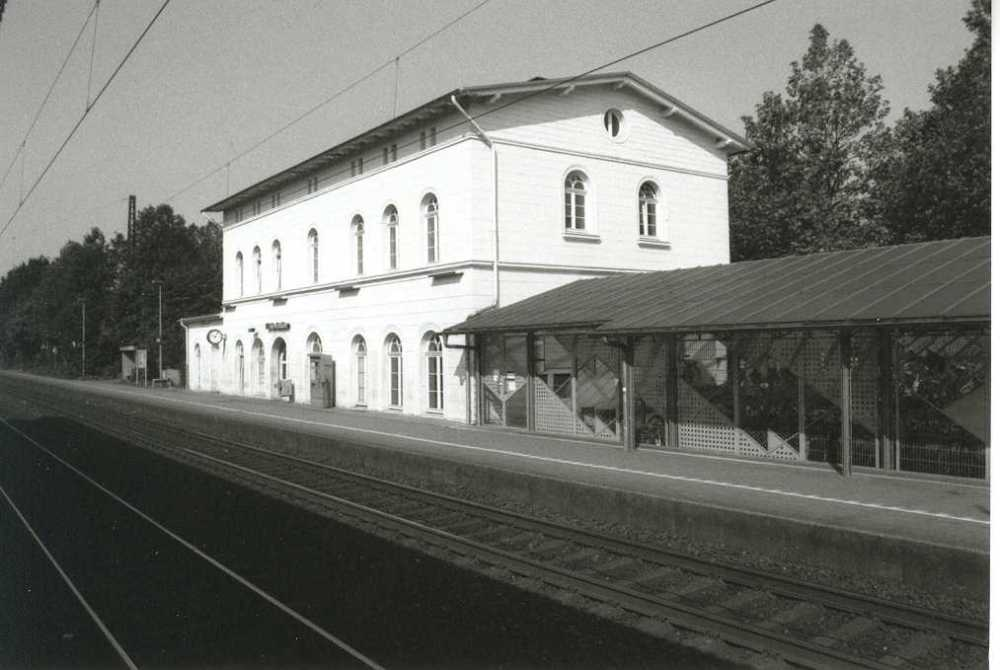
- Unaltered station built in 1847

General information
- Location: Am Bahnhof 3, Kamen, NRW; Germany
- Coordinates: 51°35′06″N 7°39′38″E
- Owner: DB Netz
- Operator: DB Station&Service
- Line: Dortmund–Hamm (KBS 415, 416)
- Platforms: 3

Construction
- Accessible: Yes

Other information
- Station code: 3095
- DS100 code: EKAM
- IBNR: 8003168
- Category: 4
- Fare zone: Westfalentarif: 42391
- Website: www.bahnhof.de

History
- Opened: 15 May 1847

Services
Preceding station	National Express Germany	Following station
Kamen-Methler towards Aachen Hbf	RE 1 (NRW-Express)	Nordbögge towards Hamm (Westf) Hbf
Dortmund Hbf towards Cologne/Bonn Airport	RE 6 (Rhein-Weser-Express)	Hamm (Westf) Hbf towards Minden
Kamen-Methler towards Düsseldorf Hbf	RE 11 (Rhein-Hellweg-Express)	Hamm (Westf) Hbf towards Kassel-Wilhelmshöhe
Preceding station		Following station
Kamen-Methler towards Düsseldorf Hbf	RE 3	Nordbögge towards Hamm (Westf) Hbf
Location
- Location within North Rhine-Westphalia

Kamen station is a station in the city of Kamen in the German state of North Rhine-Westphalia. It is on the Dortmund–Hamm railway.

The line has only two tracks through Kamen, although quadruplication is planned, but its realisation is far away. Kamen station is an architectural monument built by the Cologne-Minden Railway Company in 1847. It was extensively refurbished in the late 1990s as part of a project called Internationale Bauausstellung (international building exhibition) Emscher Park and a bike parking area (one of the first in North Rhine-Westphalia) was built.

== Services ==
It is served on weekdays by four Regional-Express services, NRW-Express (RE 1), Rhein-Emscher-Express (RE 3), Rhein-Weser-Express (RE 6) and Rhein-Hellweg-Express (RE 11), each running hourly.

Line	Line name	Route
RE 1	NRW-Express	Aachen – Cologne – Düsseldorf – Düsseldorf Airport – Duisburg – Essen – Dortmund – Kamen – Hamm (Westf)
RE 3	Rhein-Emscher-Express	Düsseldorf – Düsseldorf Airport – Duisburg – Oberhausen – Gelsenkirchen – Herne – Dortmund – Kamen – Hamm
RE 6	Rhein-Weser-Express	Cologne/Bonn Airport – Cologne – Neuss – Düsseldorf – Düsseldorf Airport – Duisburg – Essen – Dortmund – Kamen – Hamm – Bielefeld – Herford – Minden
RE 11	Rhein-Hellweg-Express	Düsseldorf – Düsseldorf Airport – Duisburg – Essen – Dortmund – Kamen – Hamm – Paderborn – Kassel-Wilhelmshöhe
