= Dortmund–Soest railway =

Railway line in Germany

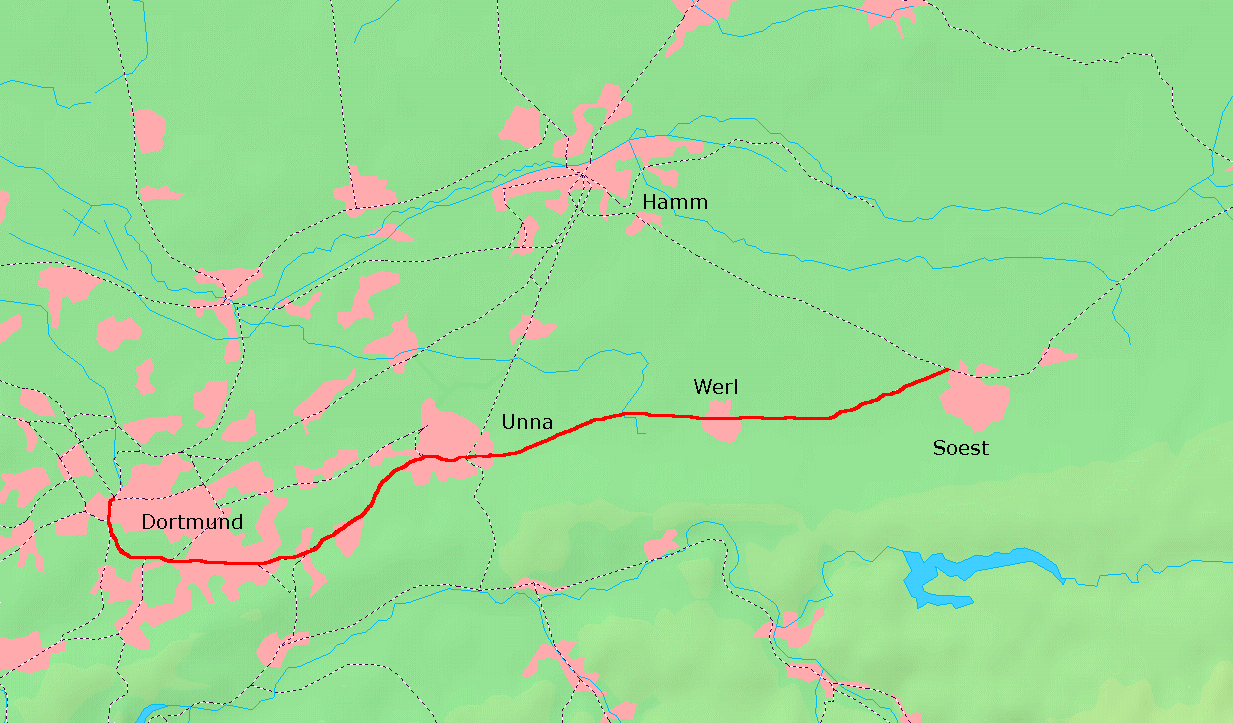

Overview
- Native name: Bahnstrecke Dortmund–Soest
- Line number: 2103
- Locale: North Rhine-Westphalia

Service
- Route number: 431

Technical
- Line length: 54 km (34 mi)
- Number of tracks: 2
- Track gauge: 1,435 mm (4 ft 8 1/2 in) standard gauge
- Electrification: 15 kV/16.7 Hz AC overhead catenary
- Operating speed: 150 km/h (93 mph) (max)

The Dortmund–Soest railway is a line in the German state of North Rhine-Westphalia. It runs from Dortmund Hauptbahnhof through the southern Dortmund district of Holzwickede to Unna and from there through the Hellweg Börde parallel to the Haarstrang ridge on the southern edge of the Westphalian Lowland via Werl to Soest. As the line was opened in 1855, it is one of the oldest railways in Germany.

This electrified route is entirely double track and is classified as a main line. It is served for its full length by the Regionalbahn RB 59 Hellwegbahn service of the Hellweg Network.

== History ==
After an initial proposal to build a railway from Dortmund to Soest was approved in 1850, on 3 June 1852, the Prussian king, Frederick William IV issued a cabinet order authorising the construction of the line from Dortmund-Hörde to Soest. Construction began on 15 September 1853 in Werl. After a first test run on 7 June 1855, the Bergisch-Märkische Railway Company (German: Bergisch-Märkische Eisenbahn-Gesellschaft) operated the first scheduled train from Dortmund to Soest on 9 July 1855. The line was double tracked in 1866 and electrified by the end of 1970.

== Operations ==
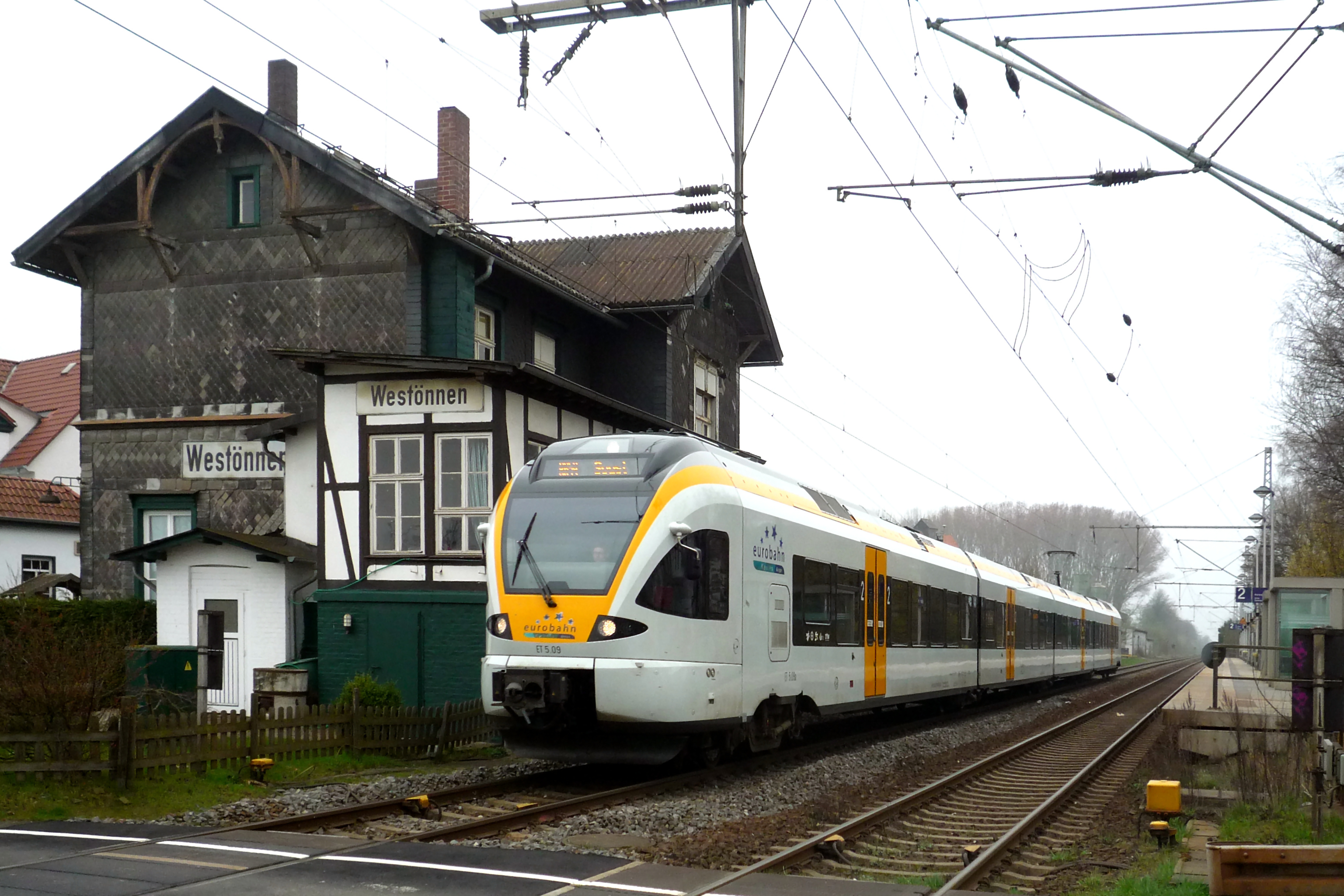
Eurobahn Hellweg-Bahn service in Westönnen

Regionalbahn RB 59 Hellweg-Bahn services run on the route Dortmund–Soest line, every half hour from Monday to Friday and every hour on Saturdays and Sundays.

The Hellweg-Bahn has been operated by the Eurobahn company since 14 December 2008, after winning the contract. These services are operated by Stadler FLIRT Electric multiple units at speeds of up to 160 km/h (99 mph).

The line's finances and tariffs are managed by the Verkehrsverbund Rhein-Ruhr (Rhine-Ruhr Transport Association, VRR) and the Verkehrsgemeinschaft Ruhr-Lippe (Ruhr-Lippe Transport Community, VRL).
