= Unna-Königsborn station =

Railway station in Germany

Unna Königsborn
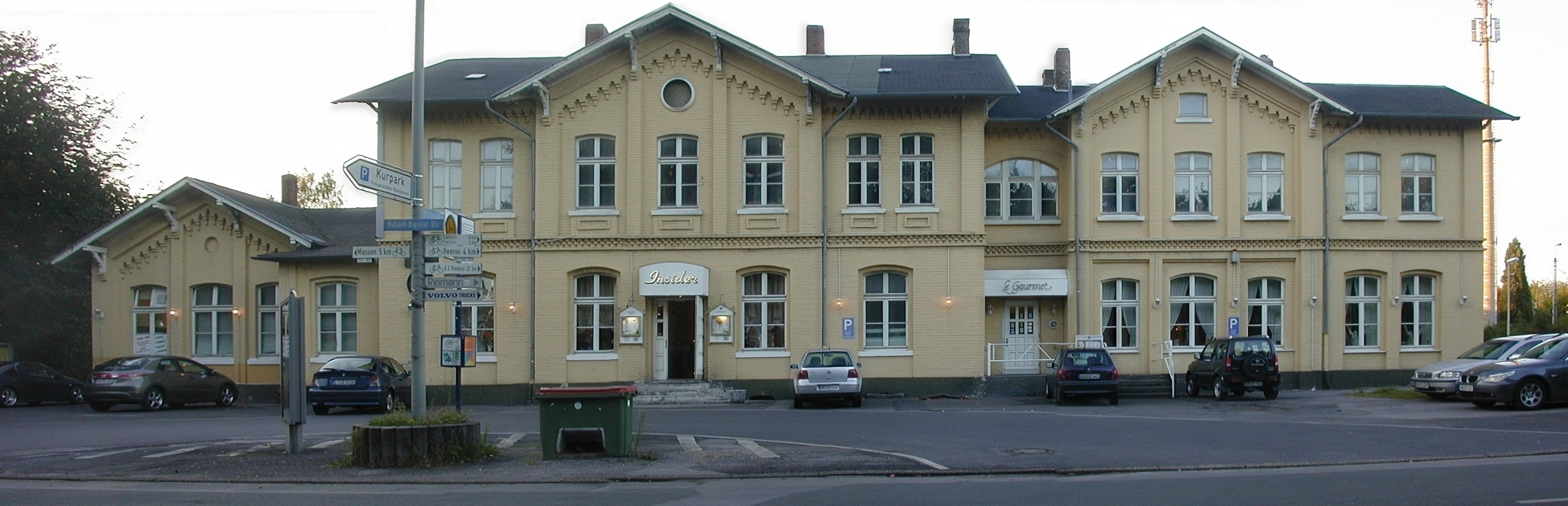

General information
- Location: Hubert-Biernat Str., Unna, NRW; Germany
- Coordinates: 51°33′13″N 7°41′20″E
- Lines: Welver–Sterkrade (KBS 450.4); Fröndenberg–Kamen (KBS 450.4)
- Platforms: 2
- Train operators: DB Regio NRW

Construction
- Accessible: Yes

Other information
- Station code: 6337
- DS100 code: EUK
- IBNR: 8005971
- Category: 6
- Fare zone: Westfalentarif: 42491
- Website: www.bahnhof.de

History
- Opened: 15 May 1876

Services
Preceding station	Rhine-Ruhr S-Bahn	Following station
Massen towards DO-Lütgendortmund	S4	Unna West towards Unna
Location

Unna-Königsborn station is located in the city of Unna in the German state of North Rhine-Westphalia. It is at the end of the remaining section of the line from Dortmund. Line S 4 trains of the Rhine-Ruhr S-Bahn reverse here on their way to and from Unna station. It is classified by Deutsche Bahn as a category 6 station.

The station is served by S 4 services between Unna and Dortmund-Lütgendortmund station via Dortmund Stadthaus and Dortmund-Dorstfeld at 30-minute intervals (15-minute intervals in the peak between Dortmund-Lütgendortmund and Unna-Königsborn).

It is also served by bus route C43 at 60-minute intervals during the day and R53 at 20- or 40-minute intervals, both operated by Verkehrsgesellschaft Kreis Unna.
