= Unna station =

Railway station in Unna, Germany

Unna
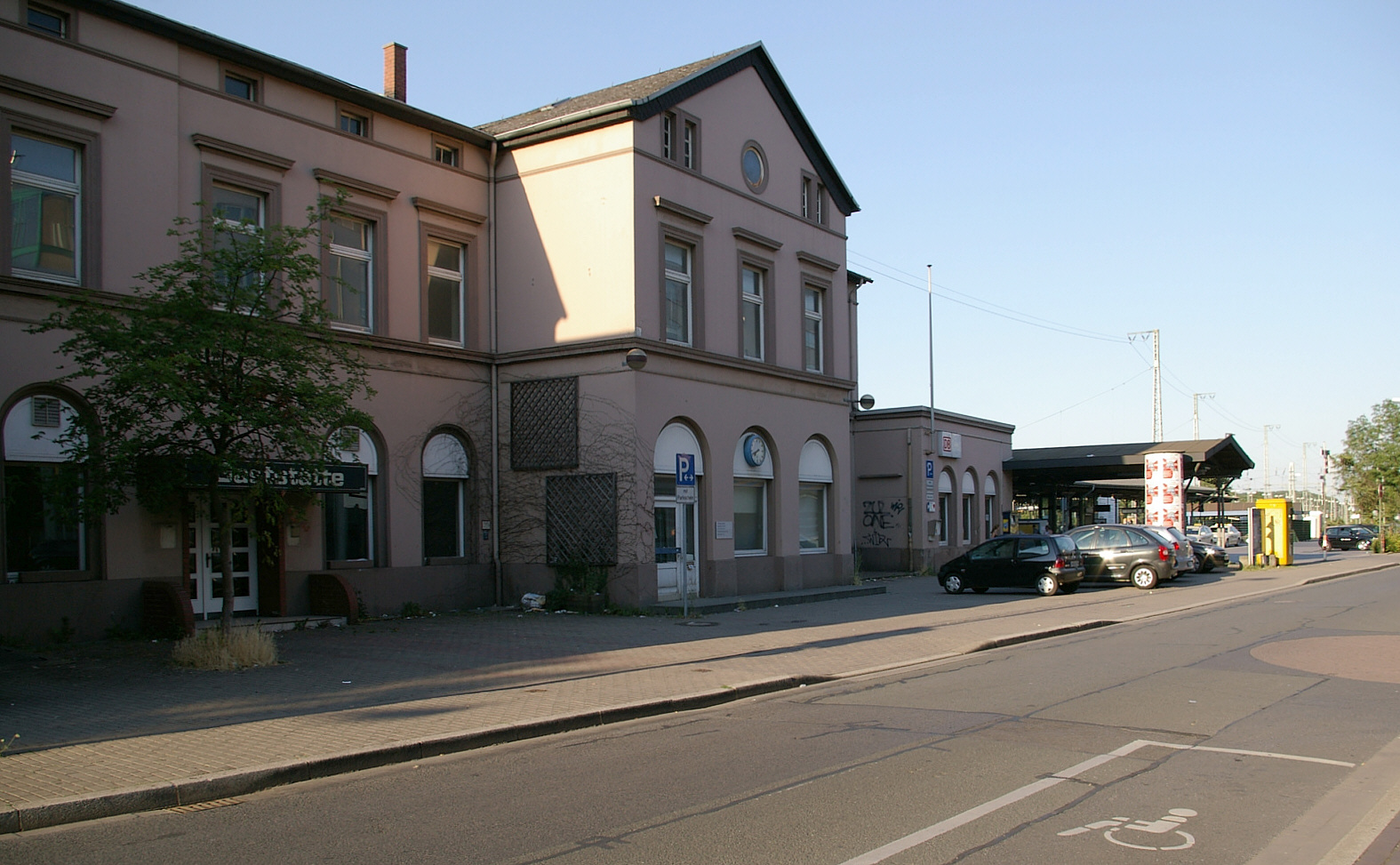
- Unna station (2006)

General information
- Location: Bahnhofstraße, Unna, NRW; Germany
- Coordinates: 51°32′19.9″N 7°41′32″E
- Owner: DB Netz
- Operator: DB Station&Service
- Lines: Hagen–Hamm; Dortmund–Soest; Fröndenberg–Unna-Königsborn
- Platforms: 5
- Train operators: DB Regio NRW; Eurobahn; National Express Germany

Construction
- Accessible: Yes, 2, 4 and 4 west (S-Bahn) only

Other information
- Station code: 6335
- DS100 code: EUN
- IBNR: 8000171
- Category: 3
- Fare zone: Westfalentarif: 42491
- Website: www.bahnhof.de

History
- Opened: 1855

Services
Preceding station	DB Regio NRW	Following station
Terminus	RB 54	Frömern towards Neuenrade
Preceding station		Following station
Holzwickede towards Venlo	RE 13	Bönen towards Hamm (Westf) Hbf
Holzwickede towards Dortmund Hbf	RB 59	Lünern towards Soest
Preceding station	National Express Germany	Following station
Holzwickede towards Krefeld Hbf	RE 7 (Rhein-Münsterland-Express)	Bönen towards Rheine
Preceding station	Rhine-Ruhr S-Bahn	Following station
Unna West towards DO-Lütgendortmund	S4	Terminus
Location
- Location within North Rhine-Westphalia

Unna station is the main passenger station in the Westphalian city of Unna in the German state of North Rhine-Westphalia. The other stations in the city that are served by regular passenger services are Unna-Königsborn, Unna West, Massen, Lünern and Hemmerde.

== History ==
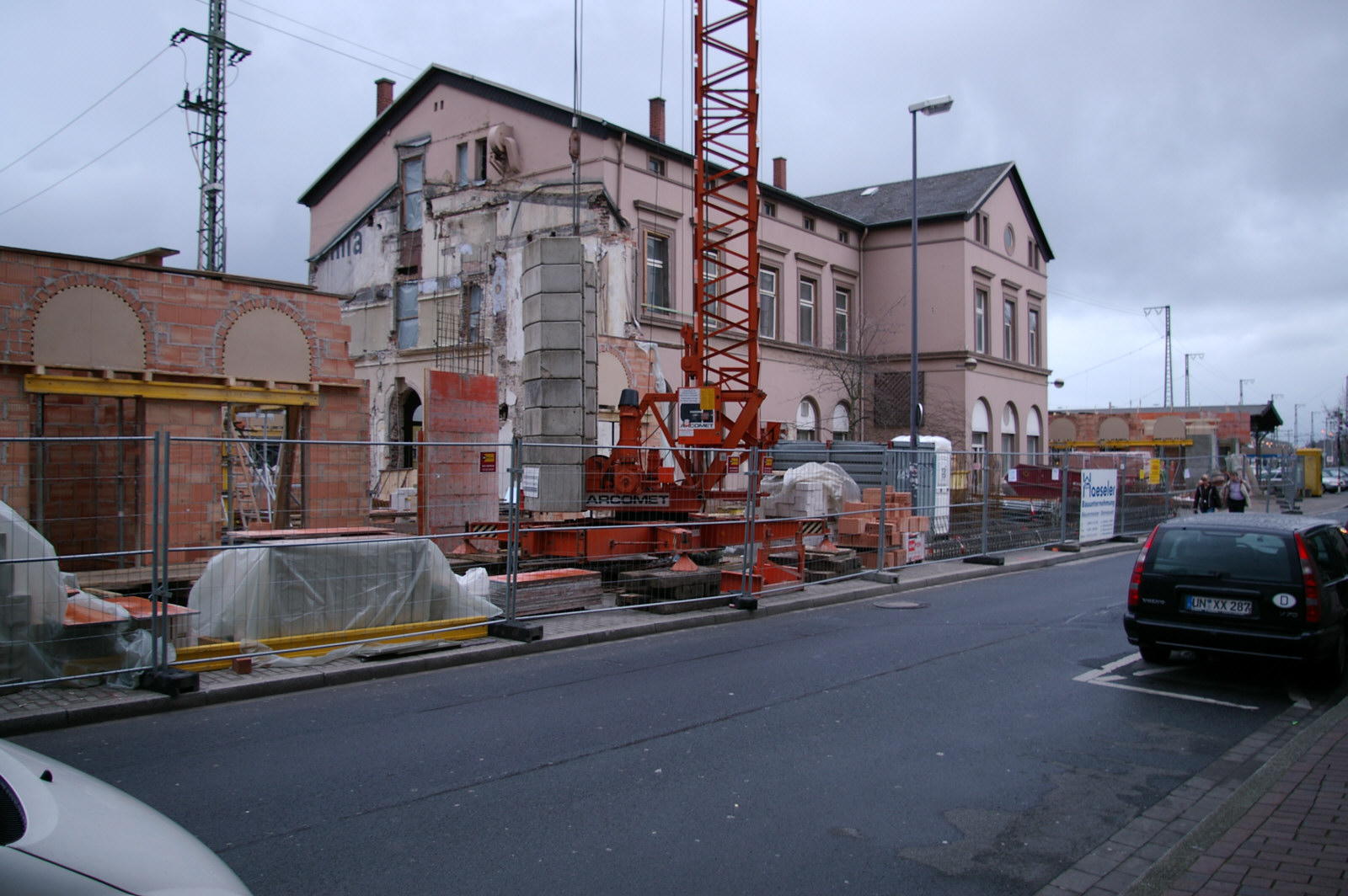
Reconstruction in 2007

The station was opened in 1855 as part of the Dortmund–Soest railway built by the Bergisch-Märkische Railway Company (BME) and equipped with an impressive station building, which was sold for non-rail purposes in 2005.

In 1866, the BME opened the line from Unna to Hamm to connect with the Cologne-Minden trunk line. Later the line was extended from Unna to Hagen, making Unna station into a railway junction of regional importance.

Between 1899 and 1901 the Prussian state railways opened the Fröndenberg–Kamen railway to connect the three east-west lines in the area. The southern part connected with the line to Menden, which was opened in 1872; this line was extended in 1912 to Neuenrade as the Hönne Valley Railway. The northern part was opened later for freight in 1900 and a year later for passenger traffic. This route is now worked only as far as Unna-Königsborn, as line S 4 of the Rhine-Ruhr S-Bahn.

Between 1909 and 1950, the Unna-Kamen-Werne light railway also connected Unna station and Kamen station.

== Connections ==
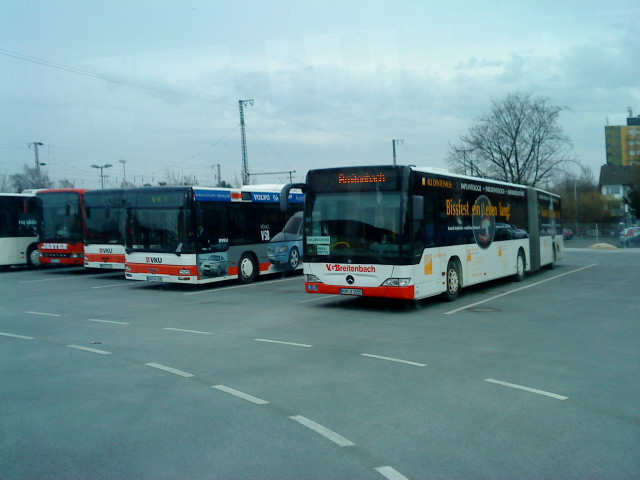
Buses in the bus station

Unna station is served by the Rhein-Münsterland-Express (RE 7, at 60-minute intervals), the Maas-Wupper-Express (RE 13, at 60-minute intervals), the Hönnetalbahn (RB 54, at 60-minute intervals), the Hellweg-Bahn (RB 59, at 30-minute intervals) and Rhine-Ruhr S-Bahn line S 4 (at 30-minute intervals). The station also serves as the central bus junction for the city.
