= Welver =

- Municipality
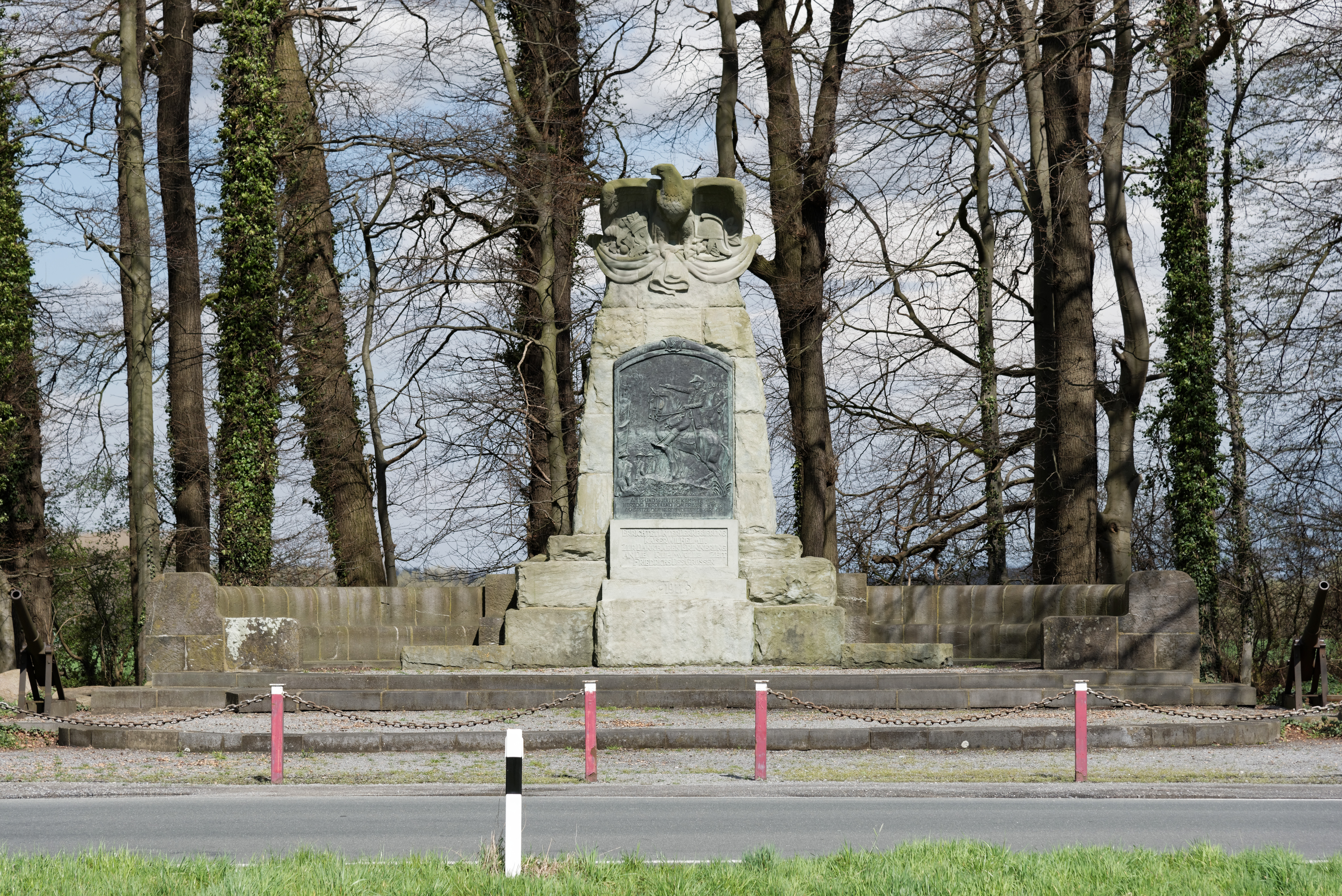
- Monument to the Battle of Vellinghausen

- Flag Coat of arms

- Location of Welver within Soest district
- Interactive map of Welver
- Location within Germany Location within North Rhine-Westphalia
- Coordinates: 51°37′0″N 7°57′30″E
- Country: Germany
- State: North Rhine-Westphalia
- Admin. region: Arnsberg
- District: Soest
- Subdivisions: 20

Government
  - Mayor (2020–25): Camillo Garzen

Area
  - Total: 85.62 km^{2} (33.06 sq mi)
- Elevation: 83 m (272 ft)

Population (2025-12-31)
  - Total: 11,983
  - Density: 140.0/km^{2} (362.5/sq mi)
- Time zone: UTC+01:00 (CET)
  - Summer (DST): UTC+02:00 (CEST)
- Postal codes: 59514
- Dialling codes: 02384
- Vehicle registration: SO
- Website: www.welver.de

Welver (German pronunciation: [ˈvɛlvɐ]) is a municipality in the district of Soest, in North Rhine-Westphalia, Germany.

== History ==
The town was once known as Villinghausen or Vellinghausen. The Seven Years' War Battle of Villinghausen was fought nearby.

== Geography ==
Welver is situated approximately 12 km south-east of Hamm and 12 km north-west of Soest.

=== Neighbouring cities, towns, and municipalities ===
- Hamm, to the west and northwest
- Lippetal, to the north
- Soest, to the east and southeast
- Werl, to the southwest

=== Division of the municipality ===
After the local government reforms of 1969, Welver consists of the following villages:

- Balksen
- Berwicke
- Blumroth
- Borgeln
- Dinker
- Dorfwelver
- Ehningsen
- Eilmsen
- Einecke
- Eineckerholsen
- Flerke
- Illingen
- Klotingen
- Meyerich
- Merklingsen
- Nateln
- Recklingsen
- Scheidingen
- Schwefe
- Stocklarn
- Vellinghausen

== Population ==
Historical population

Year	Pop.	±% p.a.
1965	8,938	—
1970	9,209	+0.60%
1975	9,925	+1.51%
1980	10,306	+0.76%
1985	10,425	+0.23%
1990	10,772	+0.66%
1995	11,563	+1.43%

Year	Pop.	±% p.a.
2000	12,787	+2.03%
2005	12,884	+0.15%
2010	12,419	−0.73%
2015	12,140	−0.45%
2020	11,829	−0.52%
2025	11,983	+0.26%

Source: Landesdatabank Nordrhein-Westfalen
