= Kreuzviertel =

Human settlement in Germany

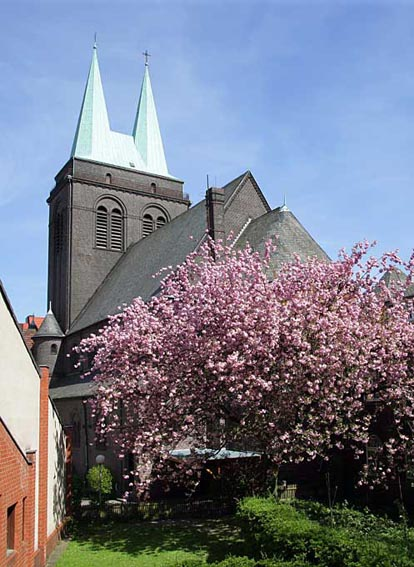
Church of the Holy Cross

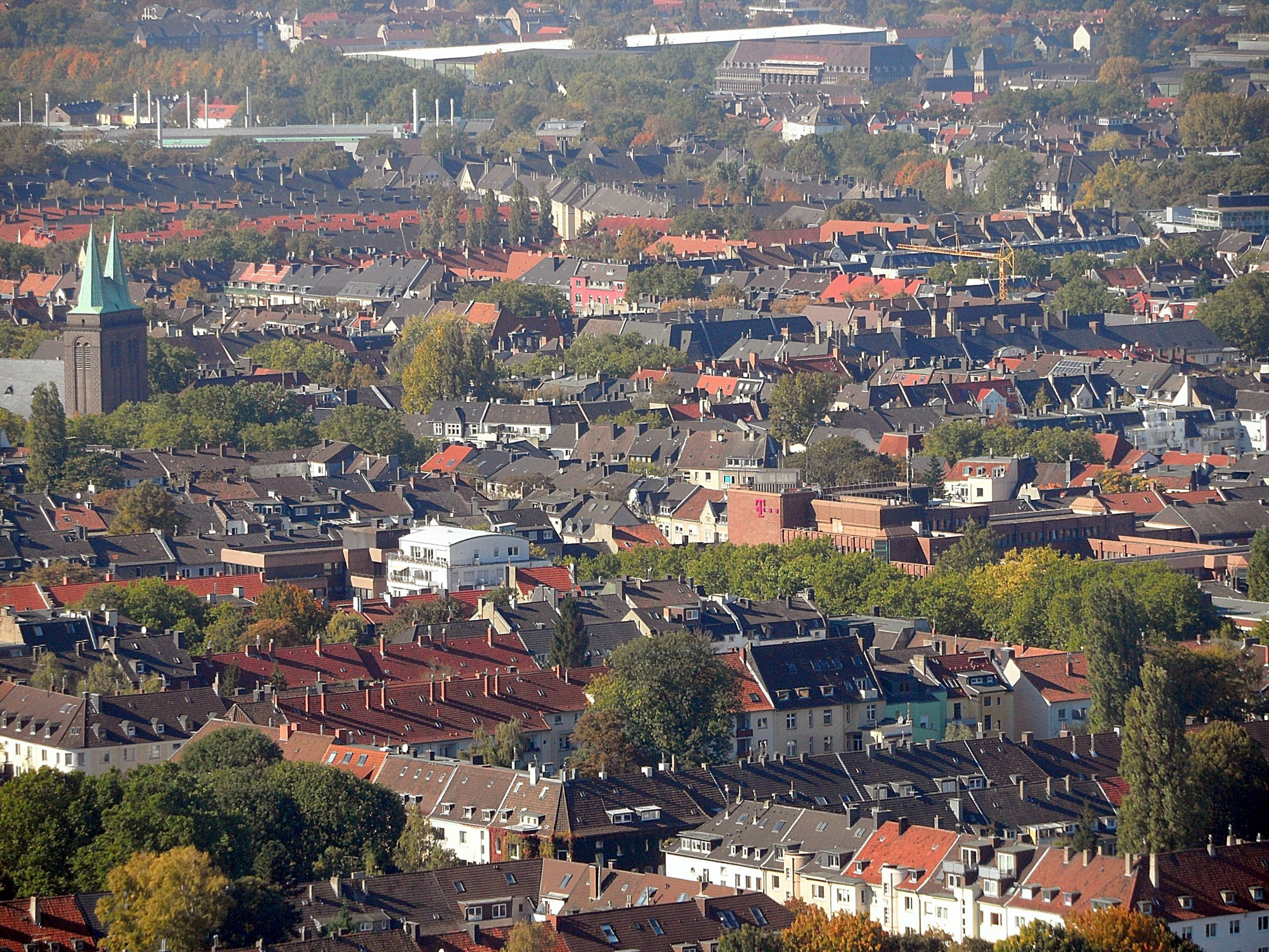
Aerial view of urban Kreuzviertel

Kreuzviertel (German pronunciation: [ˈkʁɔʏtsˌfɪʁtl̩]) is a neighbourhood of Dortmund, Germany and it has about 15,885 inhabitants (2015). Along with the Nordstadt in the north and the Kaiserviertel in the east, it is part of Dortmund's dense inner city districts.

The Kreuzviertel with its Wilhelmine style buildings is a beloved residential quarter and has some of the highest real estate prices in Dortmund. Nowadays the Kreuzviertel is a trendy district with pubs, restaurants, cafés, galleries and little shops. Moreover, local efforts to beautify and invigorate the neighbourhood have reinforced a budding sense of community and artistic expression. The West park is the green lung of the Kreuzviertel and in the months between May and October a centre of the student urban life.

== Geography ==
Kreuzviertel is a portion of the Innenstadt-West district in south Dortmund. Kreuzviertel lies at the south border of the inner city (Wallring). The southern border of Kreuzviertel is Autobahn A 40, the western border is the historic Ruhr line of the Rhenish Railway Company, today Rhine-Ruhr S-Bahn and the eastern the Märkische Straße. Normally the people of Dortmund say Kreuzviertel is hemmed in by Sonnenstraße (North), Hohe Straße (East), Rheinlanddamm (South) and Große Heimstraße (West).

== History ==
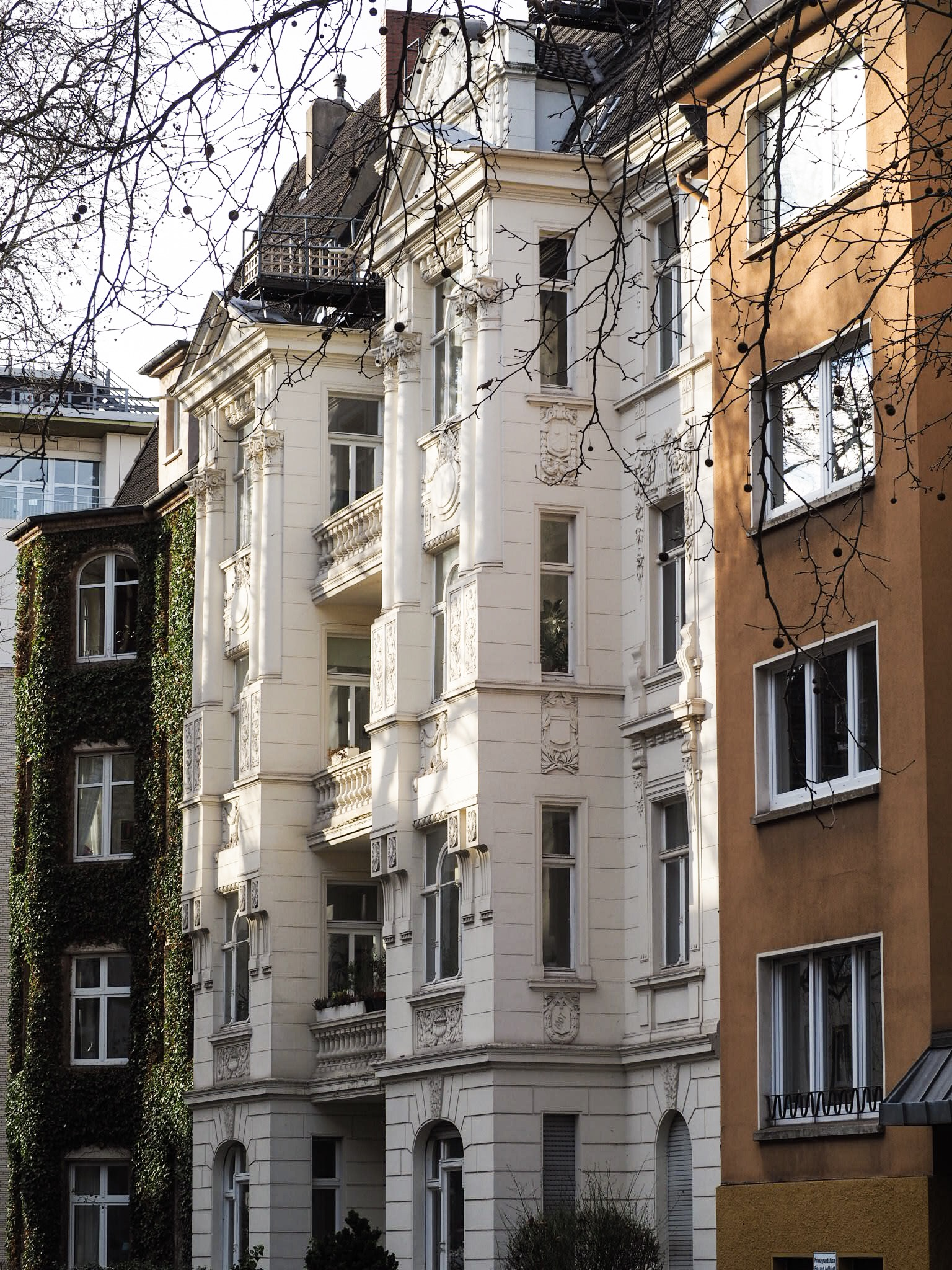
Art Nouveau house

=== Origin of the name ===
Kreuzviertel got its name from the Church of the Holy Cross Kreuzkirche, which represents the center of the borough.

=== Urban planning ===
Kreuzviertel grew substantially during the Gründerzeit boom based on an urban planning design from 1858 by Baumeister Ludwig. The Kreuzviertel was part of what became known as the Gründerzeit Ring with an officialdom population against the a primarily working-class population in the north. That's the reason why the Kreuzviertel is characterised by richly embellished and decorated buildings, the majority of which come from the turn of the 20th century (1884 to 1908). Over 80% of all housing in this area was constructed before 1948, with the oldest building the Dortmund University of Applied Sciences and Arts still standing being from 1896. In the second World War, relatively few buildings were destroyed in comparison to other areas of the city. In the 1970-80 the Kreuzviertel became a popular neighbourhood for students; however, in recent years, the gentrification that paralleled the borough's rise in popularity resulted in an exodus of students to cheaper neighborhoods.

== Lifestyle ==
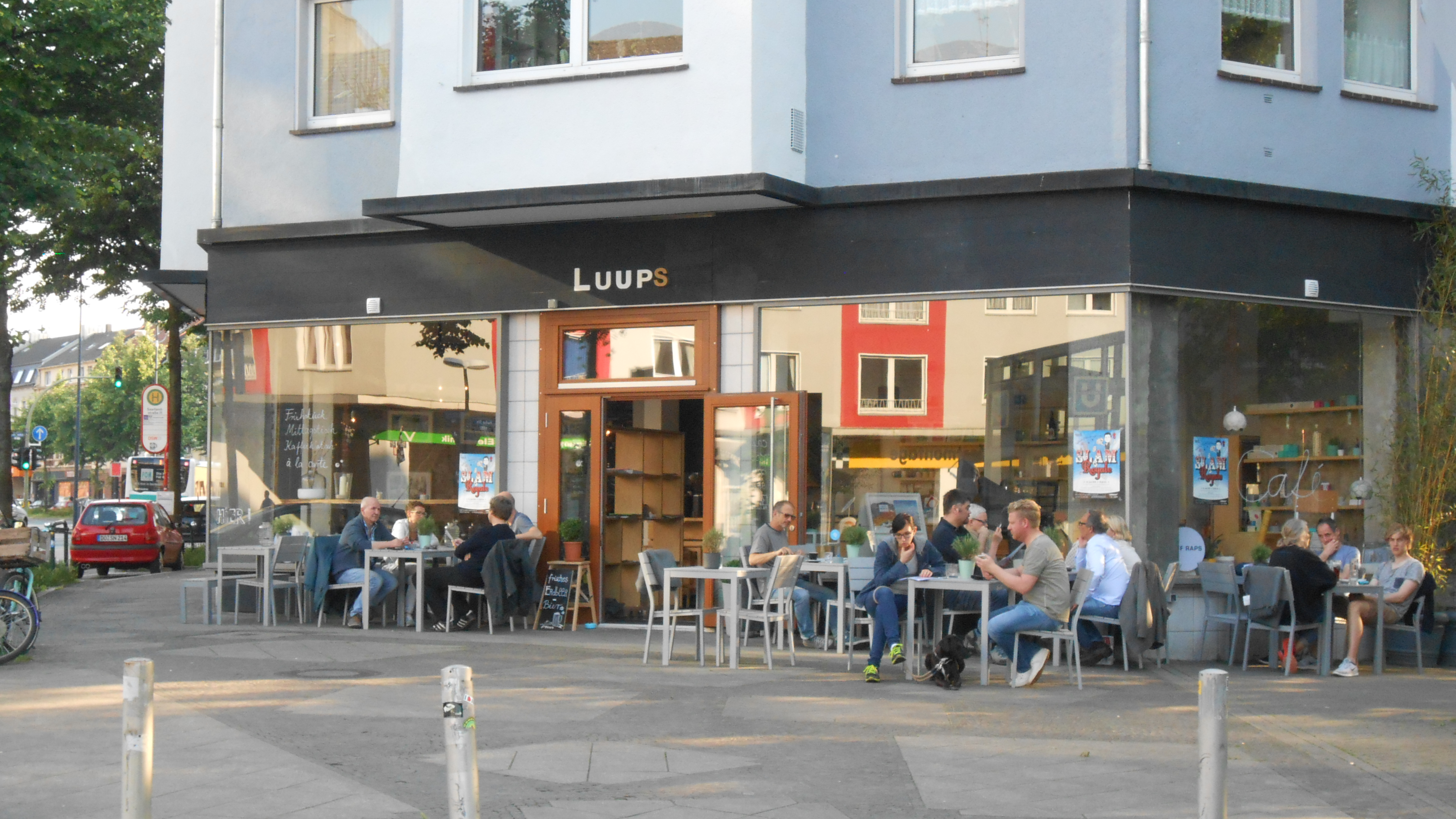
Just one of many examples of Cafe, Bars and Restaurants

Kreuzviertel is now considered one of the most fashionable areas in the Ruhr Valley, and is home to numerous design and art stores. It is known for its many bars, clubs, pubs, and cafes, concentrated in the vicinity of Kreuzstraße and Vinke Platz and create a day and nightlife atmosphere unique from the rest of the city. The West park is the green lung of Kreuzviertel and in the months between May and October a centre of the student urban life. Unlike other parts of Dortmund, it retains much of its prewar architecture and is still replete with cobble-stoned streets and ornate buildings from the beginning of the 20th century. The Kreuzviertel is also popular by local fans and those visiting of Borussia Dortmund as a last resort for drinking a cheep beer in the numerous Pubs around the Signal Iduna Park in the South of the Kreuzviertel.

Even today many artists choose Kreuzviertel as their residence: Sascha Schmitz, Christina Hammer and players of Borussia Dortmund.

== Sights ==
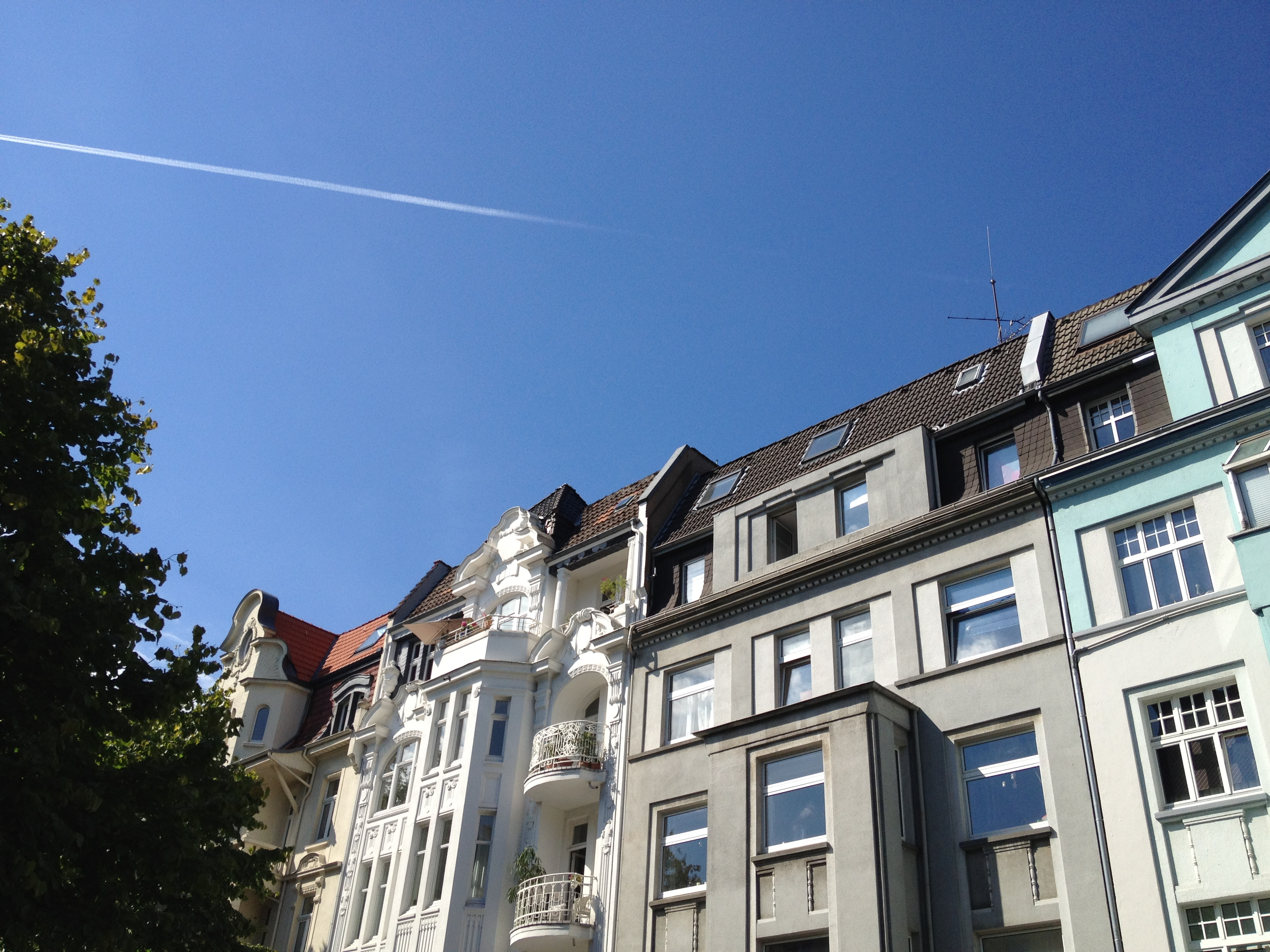
Typical Art Nouveau buildings

- Particular architectural delights are found in the dozen or more Art Nouveau houses designed by a variety of well-known architects.
- The imposing St. Nicolai Church, designed by Karl Pinno und Peter Grund and built between 1927 and 1930 is the first and largest Church of the new Objectivity.
- The Möllerbrücke Dortmund Möllerbrücke station is a bridge construction from 1898.
- The Kreuzkirche was one was the best examples for Brick Expressionism built in 1914–1920. The material could withstand difficult industrial conditions and permitted the creation of well-balanced and varied facade designs with relatively little effort.
- There is not a lot of open space in the municipality, although the Westpark and Tremoniapark abuts its western side.

== Education ==
The Dortmund University of Applied Sciences and Arts with 12,300 students, and 669 staff, 232 of which are professors is located in the borough. The departments of mechanical and electrical engineering are located at Sonnenstraße near the Möllerbrücke. The department of design has its own campus at Max-Ophüls-Platz near Rheinlanddamm while the departments of social work, economics, computer science and architecture are housed in several buildings next to the Technical University of Dortmund campus in the suburb of Eichlinghofen.

== Transportation ==
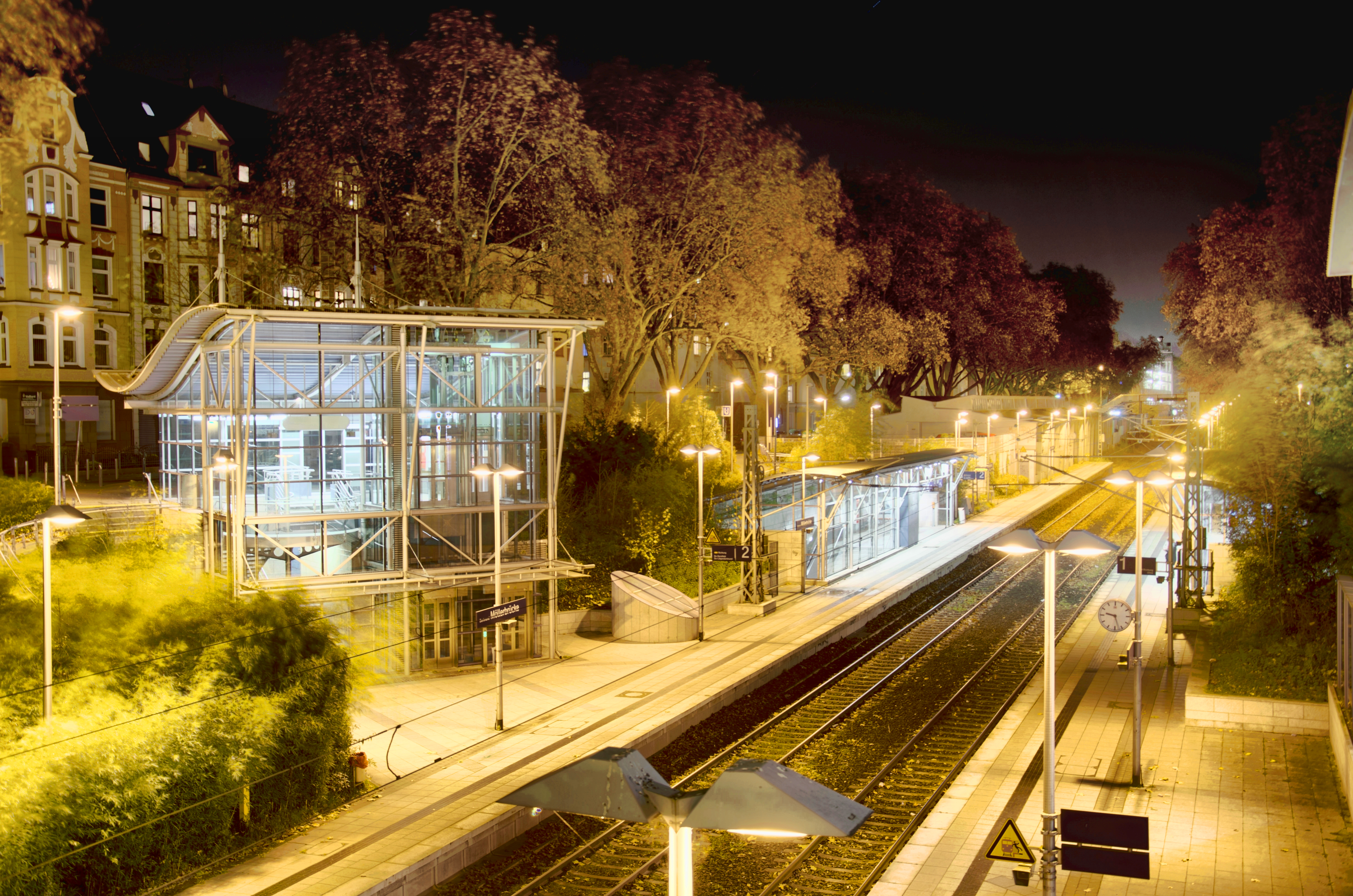
Night view of the S-Bahn station

The borough is connected to the city centre of Dortmund by a lot of light rail stations of Dortmund Stadtbahn line U42, 45 and U46. The Dortmund Möllerbrücke station. The station is named after the nearby Möller bridge (Möllerbrücke) and is classified by Deutsche Bahn as a category 5 station. The above ground section of the station is served by Rhine-Ruhr S-Bahn line S 4 and the underground section is served by line U42 of the Dortmund Stadtbahn. The Bundesautobahn 40 officially been named Ruhrschnellweg (Ruhr Fast Way), but locals usually call it Ruhrschleichweg (Ruhr Crawling Way) or "the Ruhr area's longest parking lot" connects Kreuzviertel with the Ruhr Valley. As a predominantly residential area the Kreuzviertel mainly has narrow roads, which are calm in relation to traffic. But for a few exceptions all the roads are one-way streets, which change directions at cross roads. Therefore, the Kreuzviertel is much loved by driving schools.

It is also served by line U42 of the Dortmund Stadtbahn at 10-minute intervals.

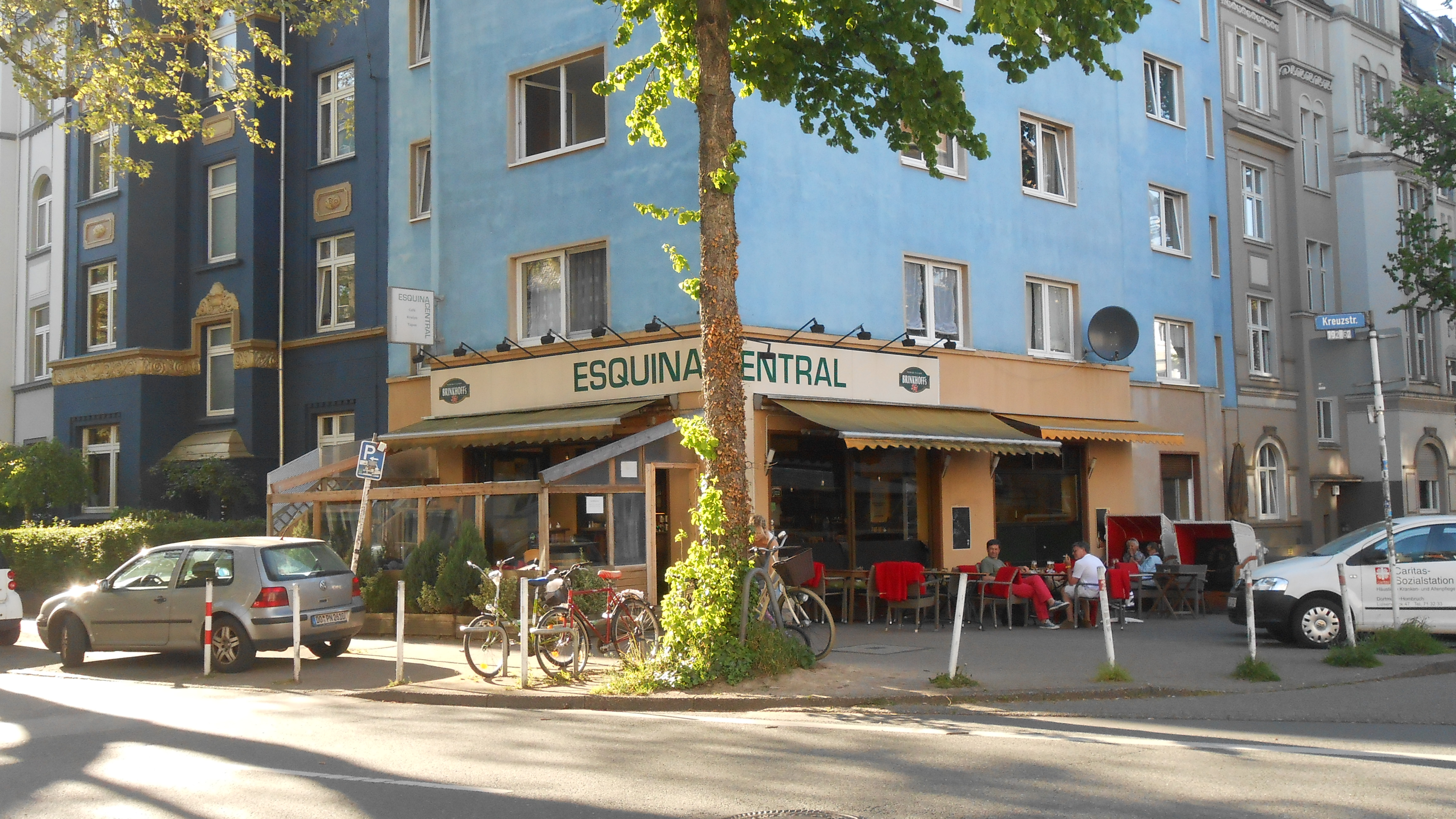
Pubs im Kreuzviertel

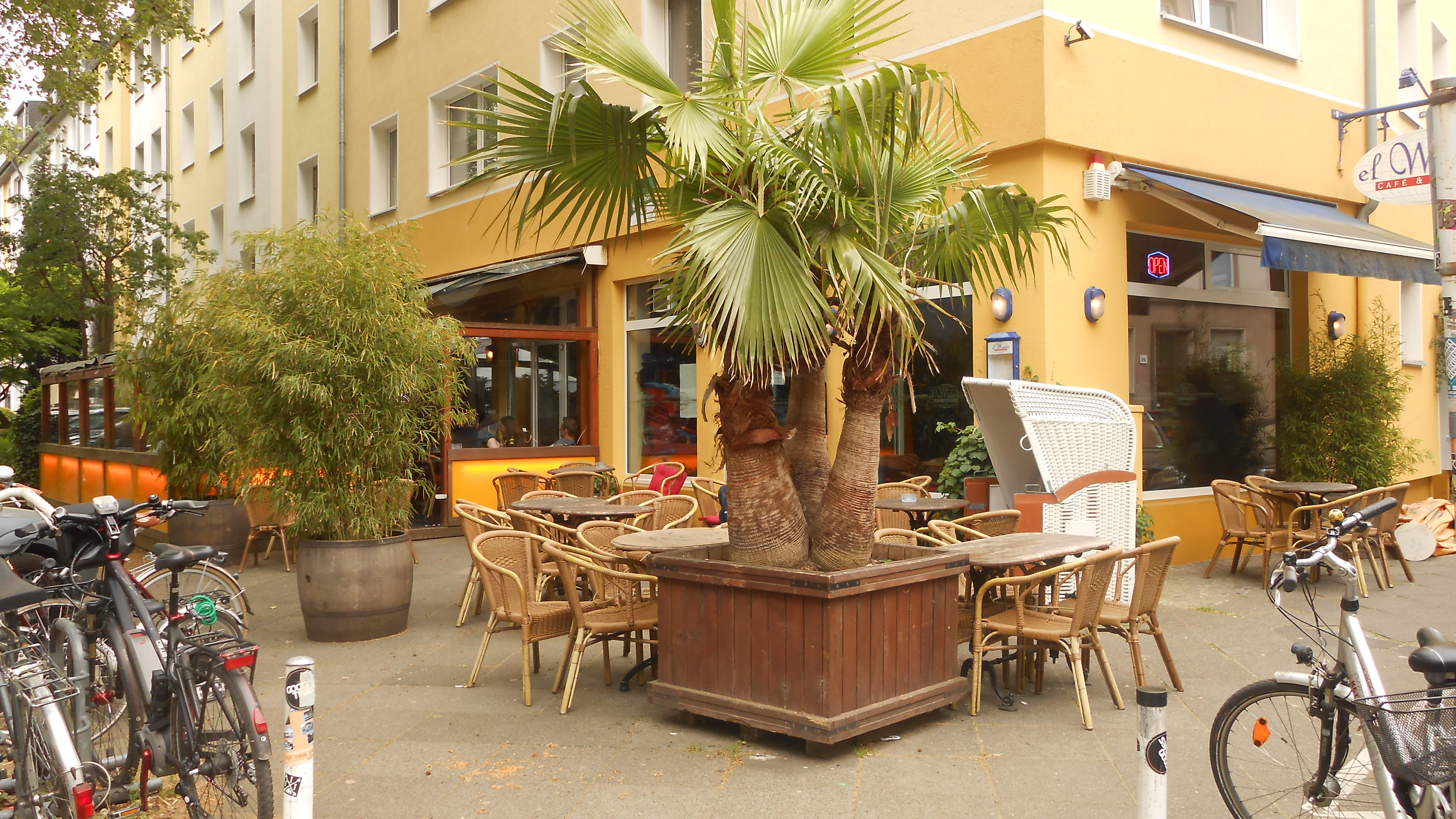
Cafes Kreuzviertel

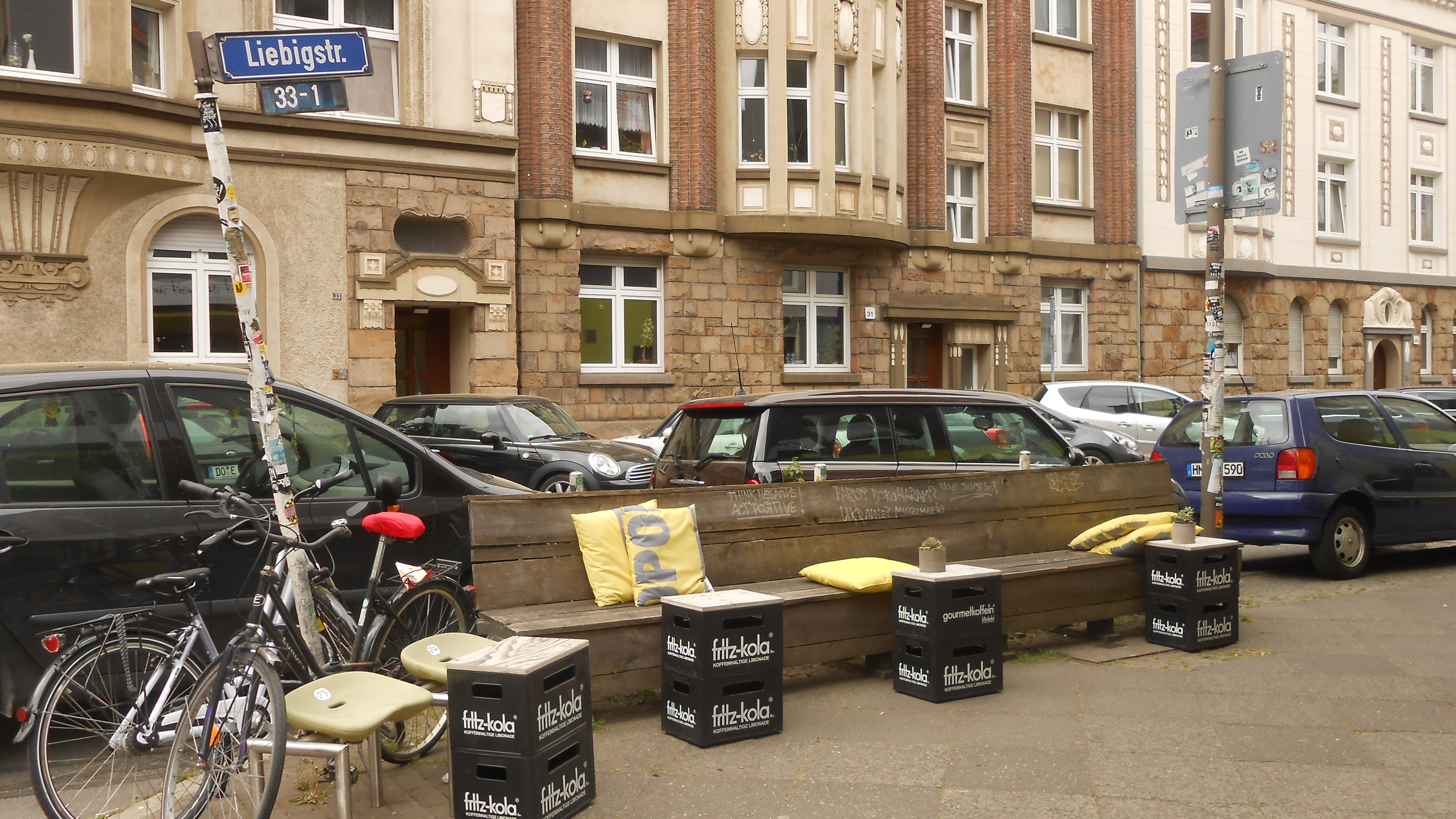
Restaurants Kreuzviertel

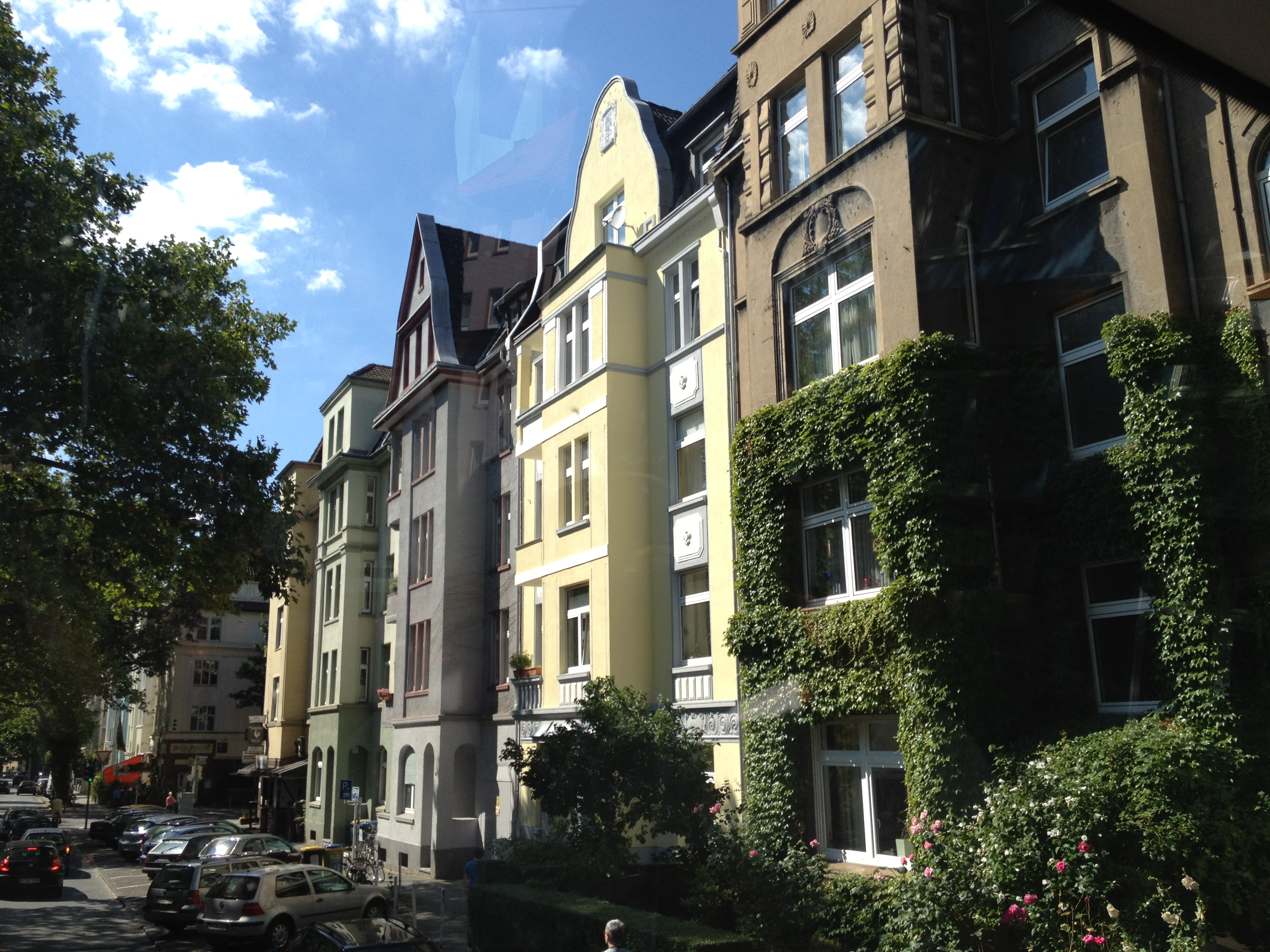
Kreuzstraße

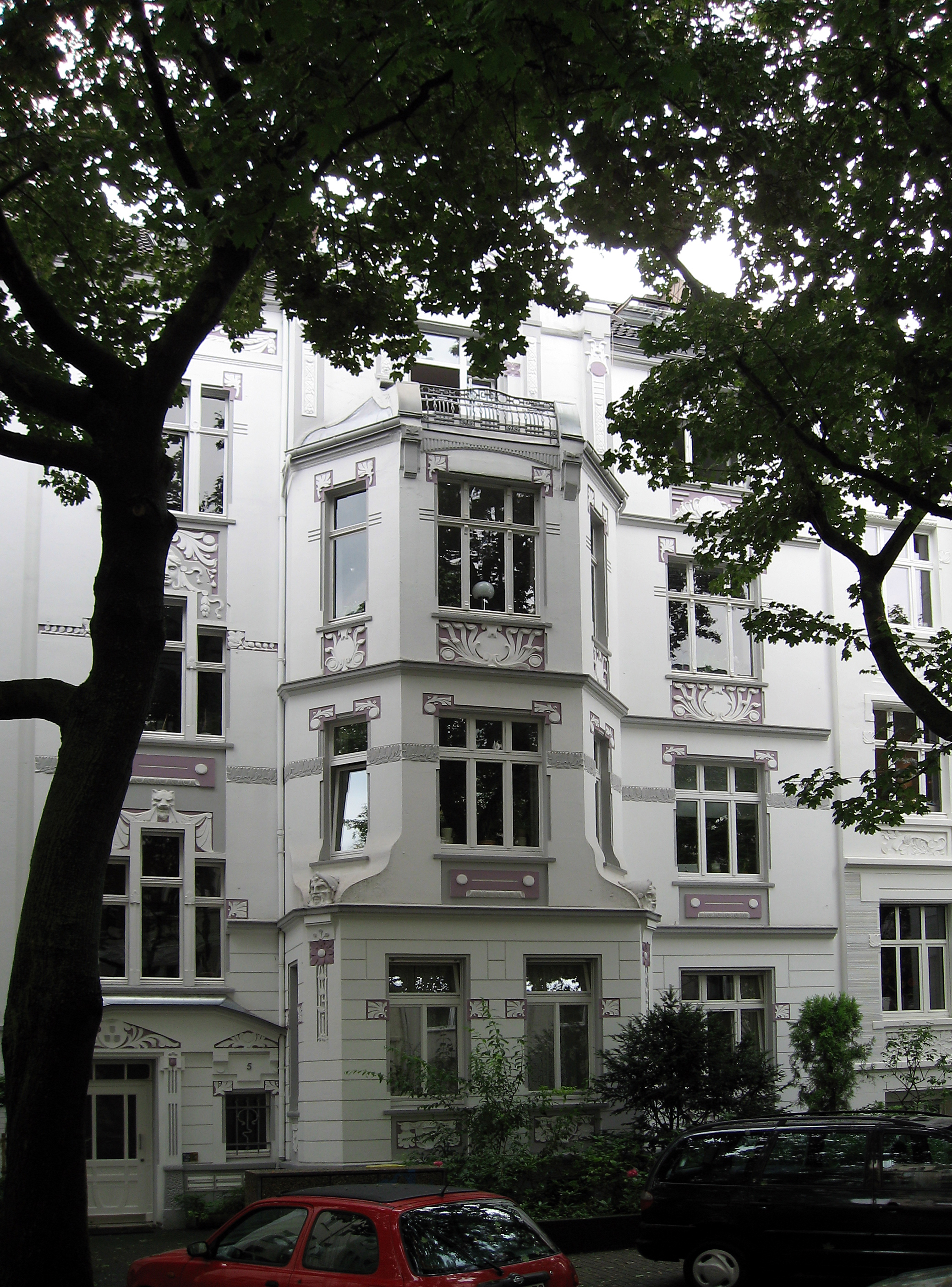
Hausfassade an der Arneckestraße

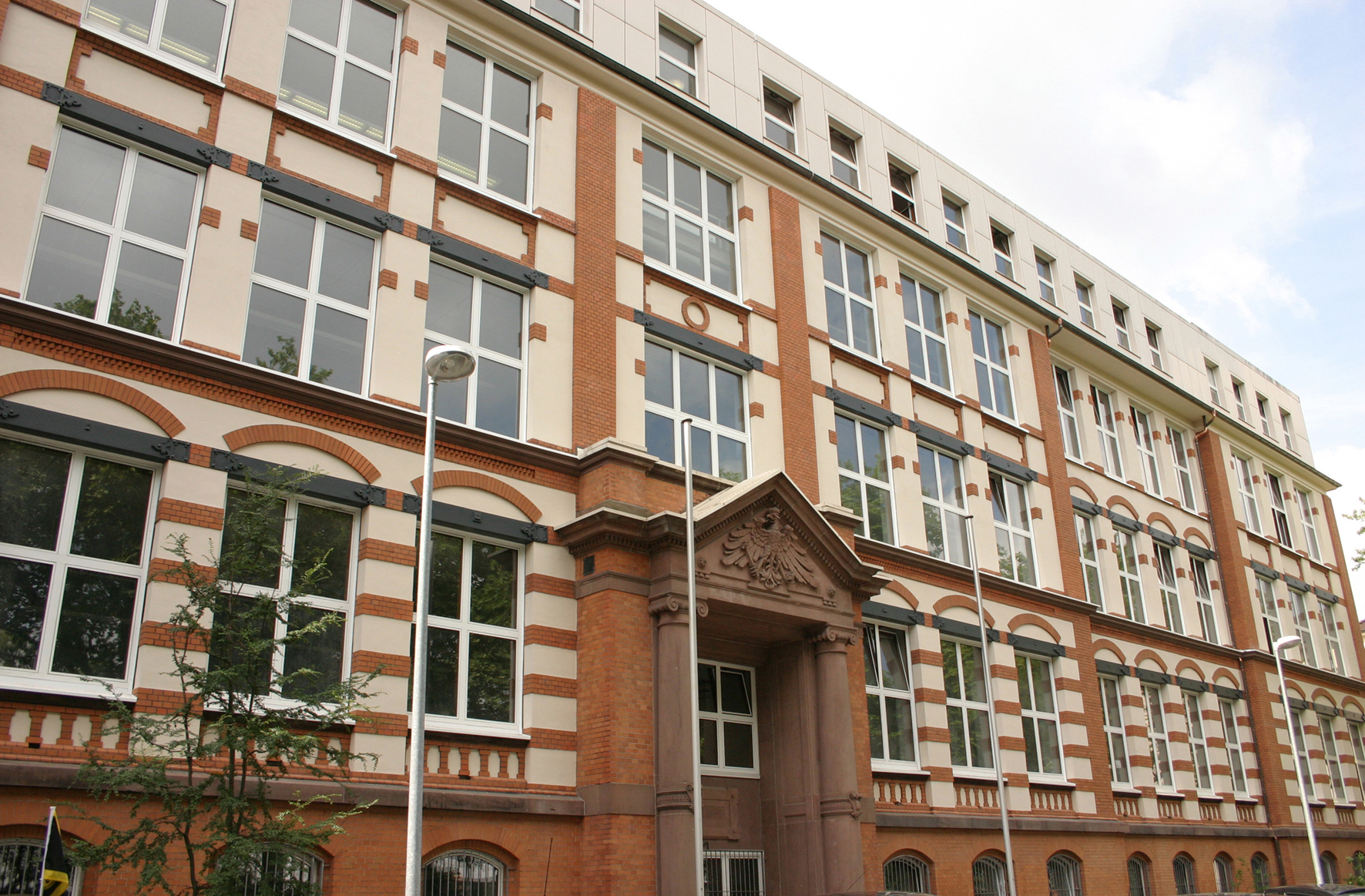
Fachhochschule Dortmund

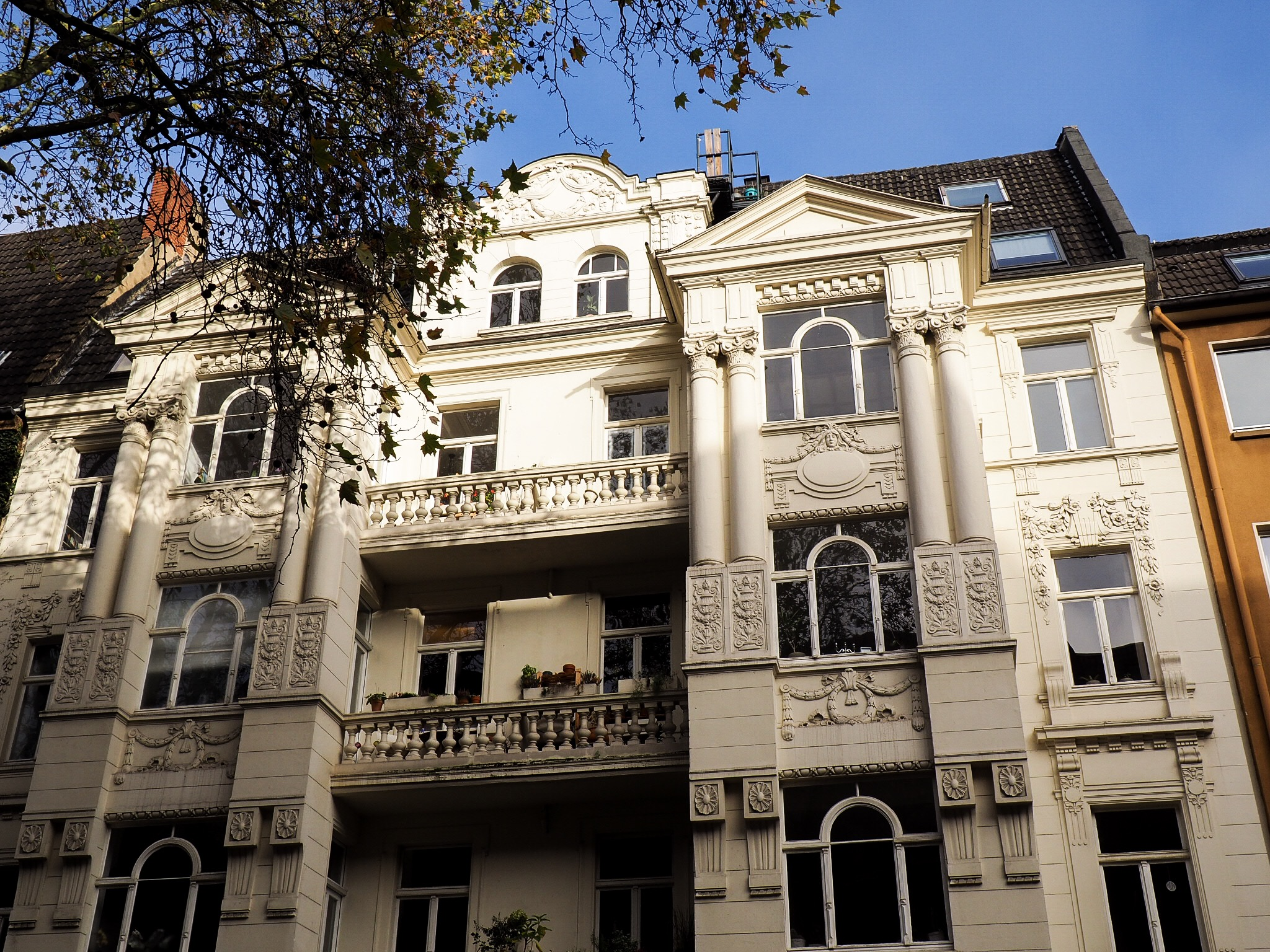
Facade Neuer Graben 11, Kreuzviertel Dortmund

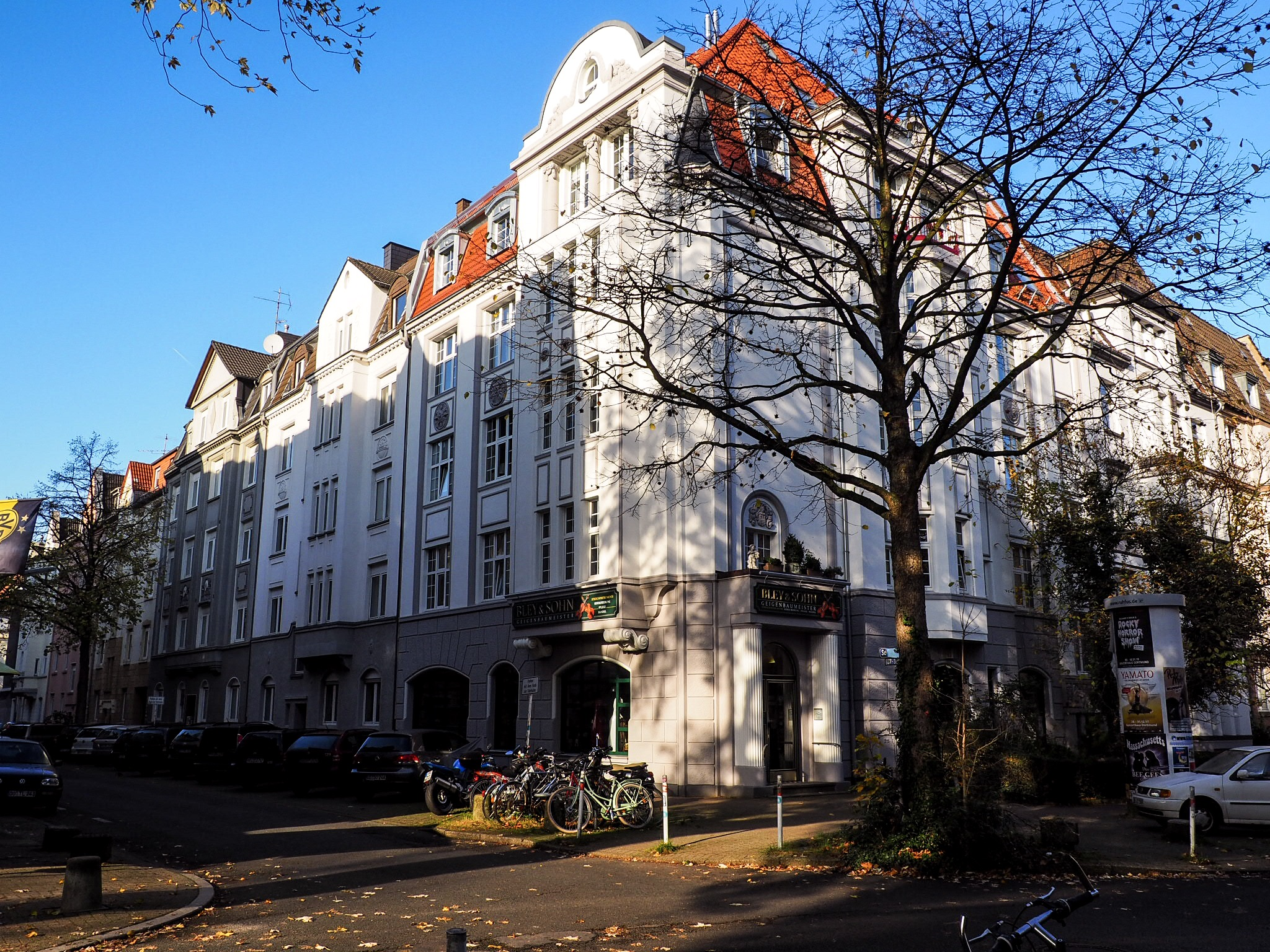
Residential block, Kreuzviertel Dortmund

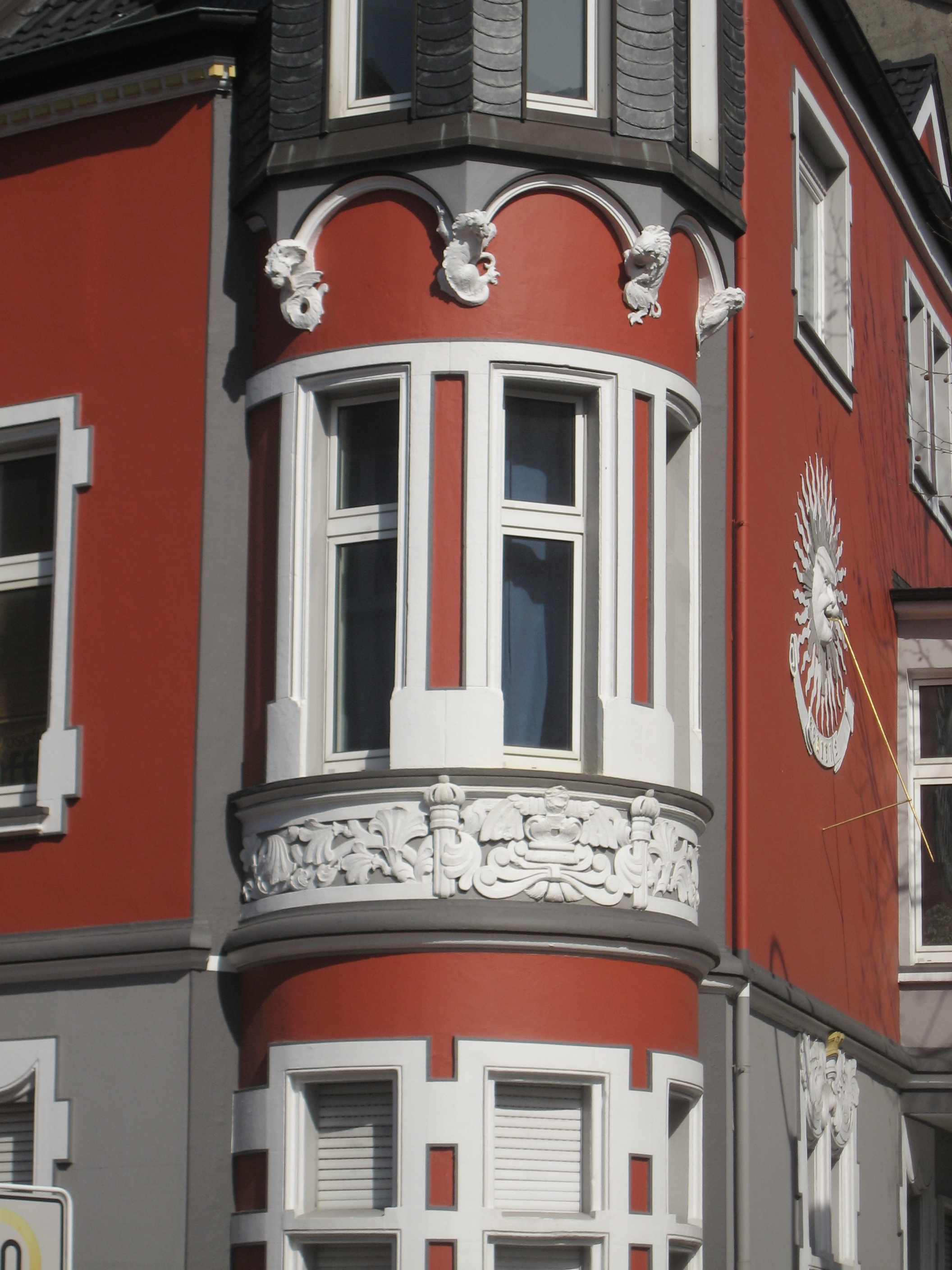
house facade, Kreuzviertel, Dortmund

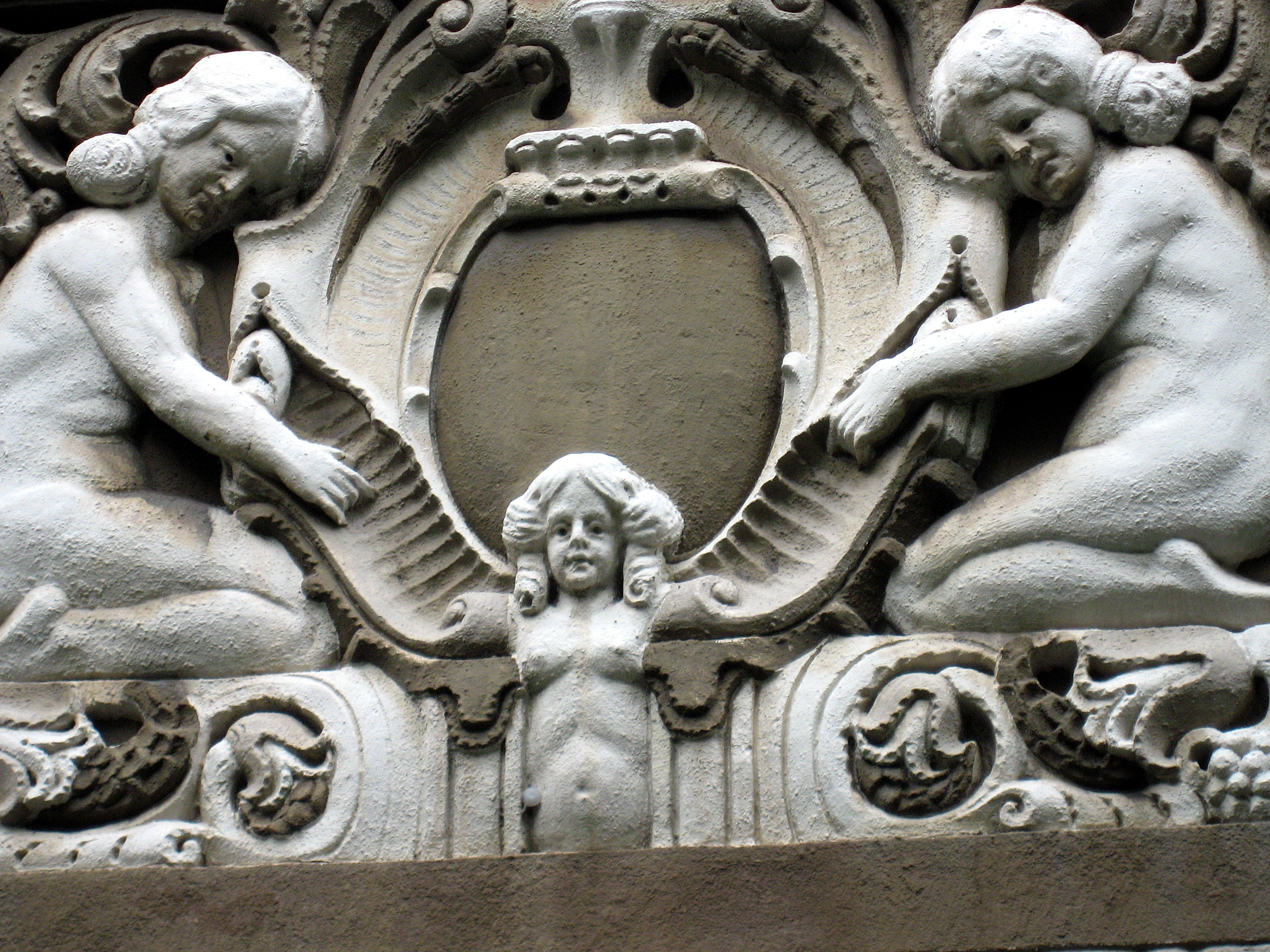
Kreuzviertel facade

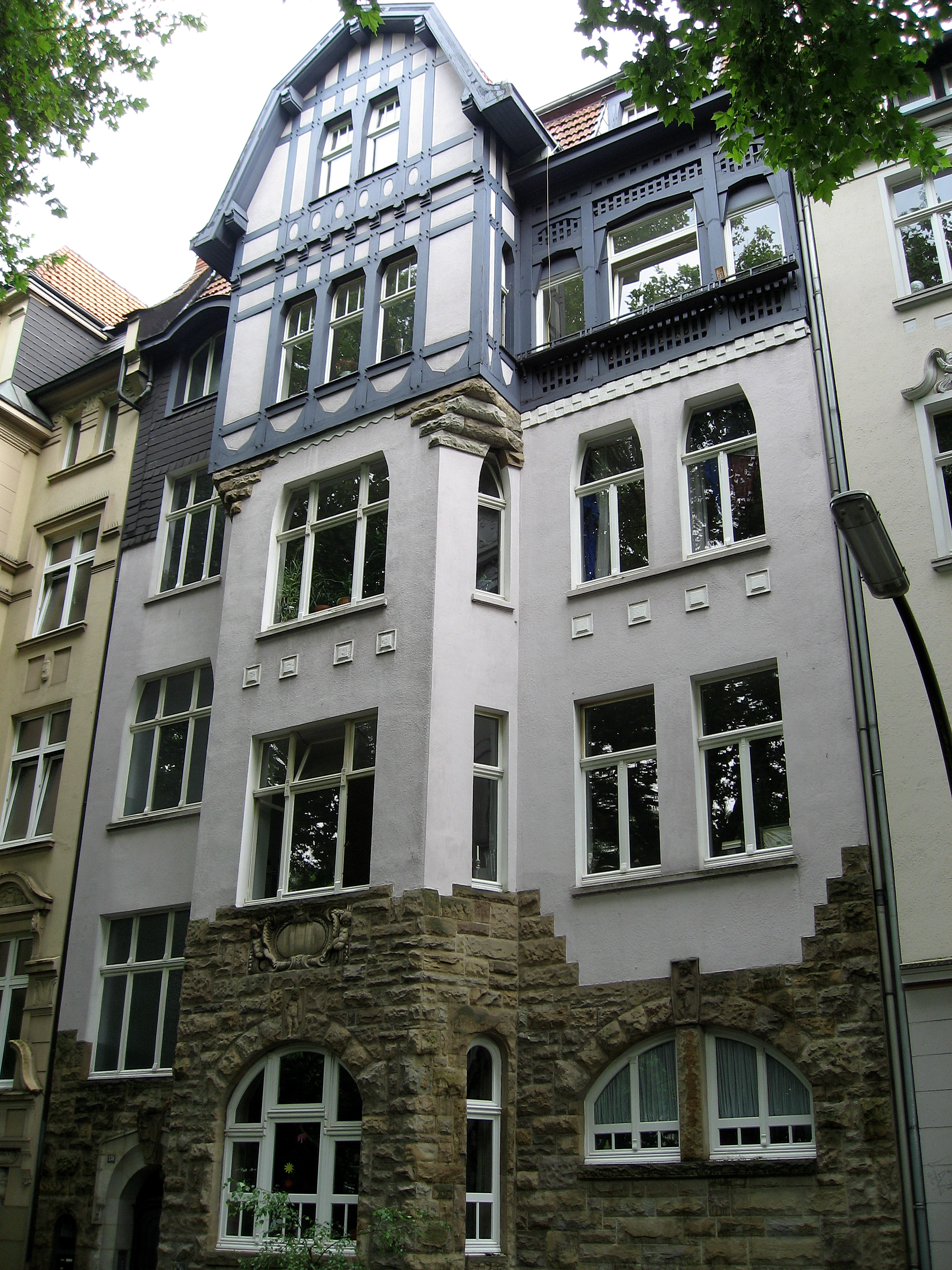
Kreuzviertel facade

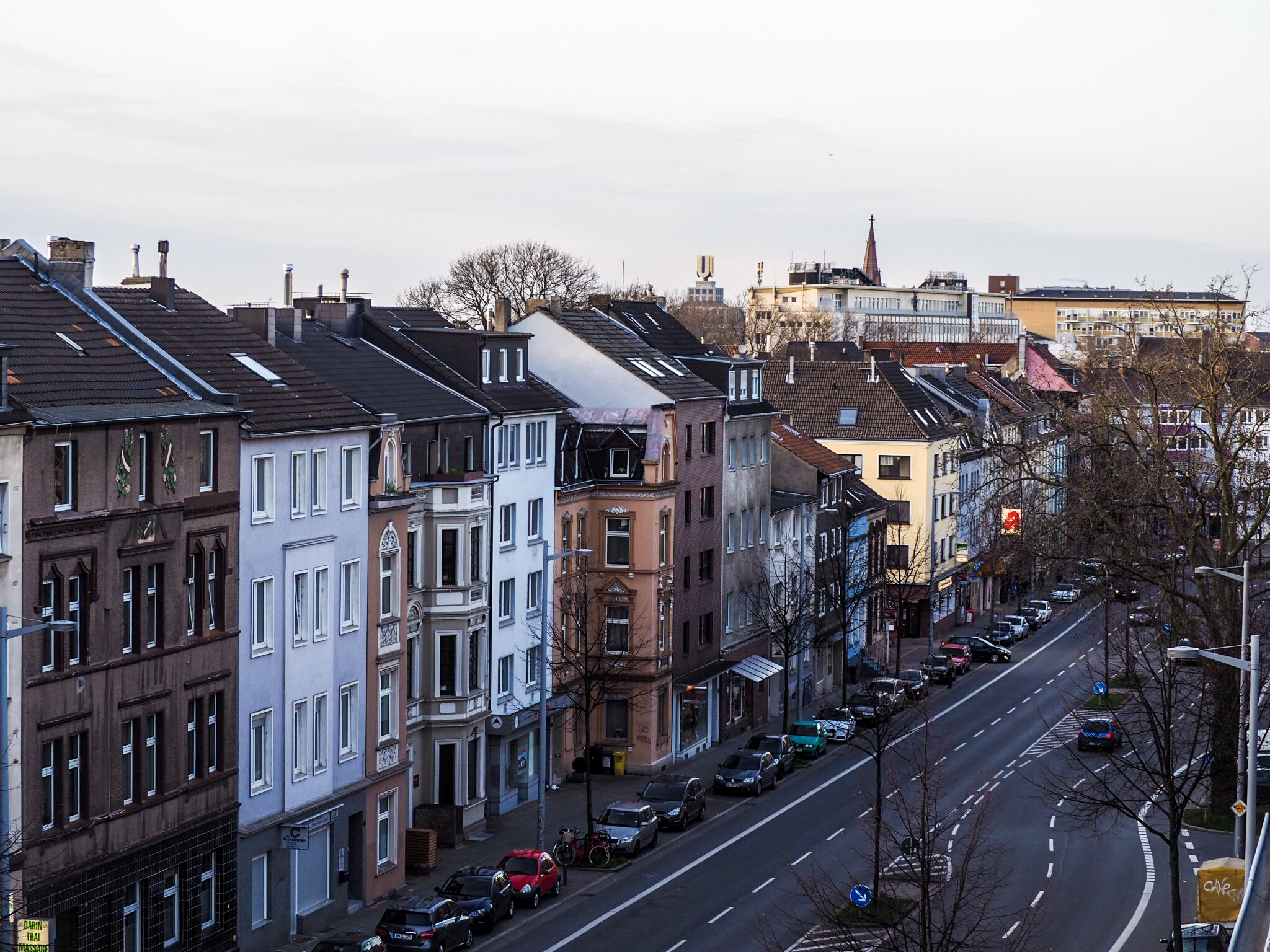
Hohe Straße

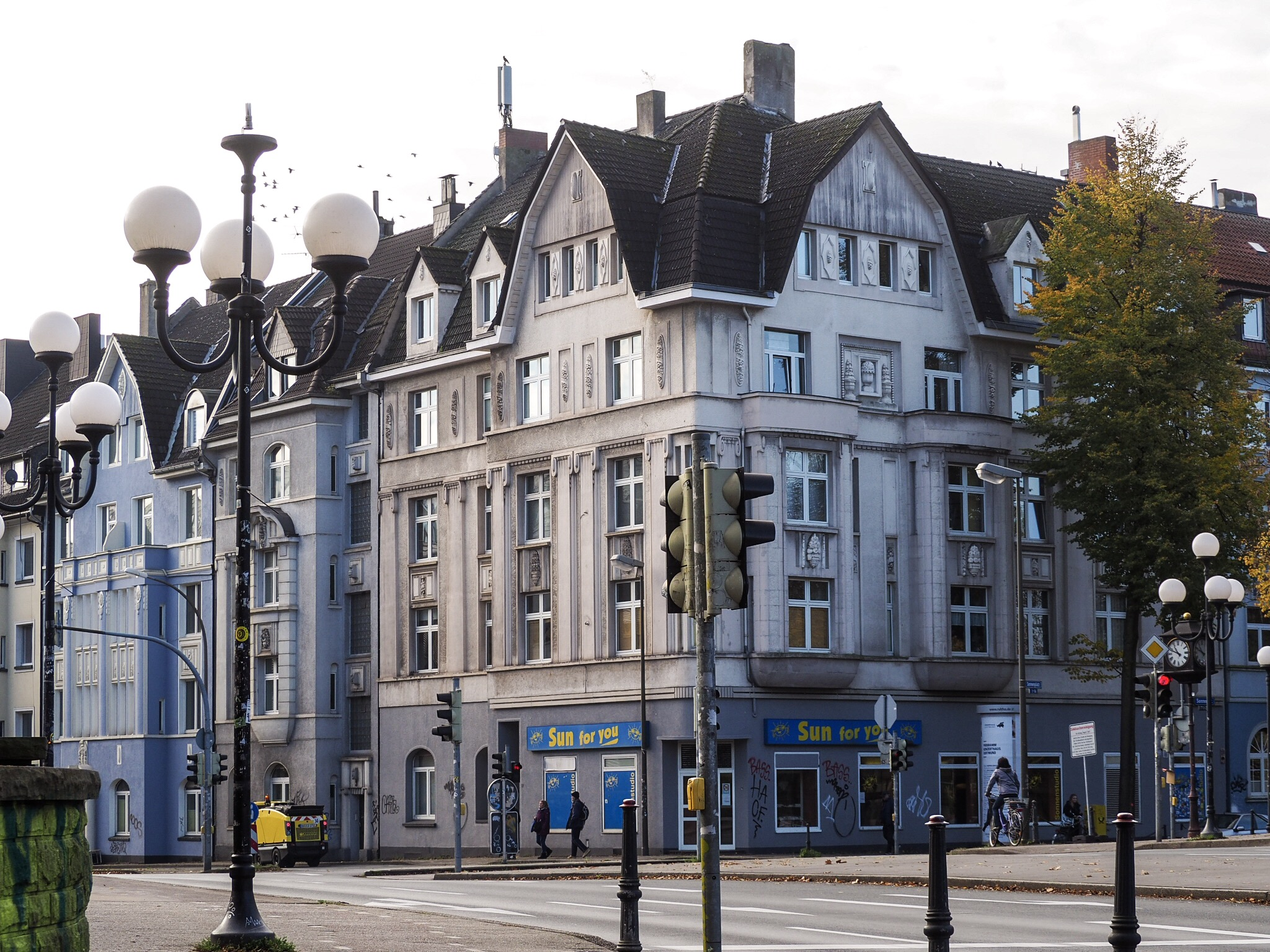
Möllerbrücke
