= Dortmund Stadthaus station =

Railway station in Dortmund, Germany

Dortmund Stadthaus
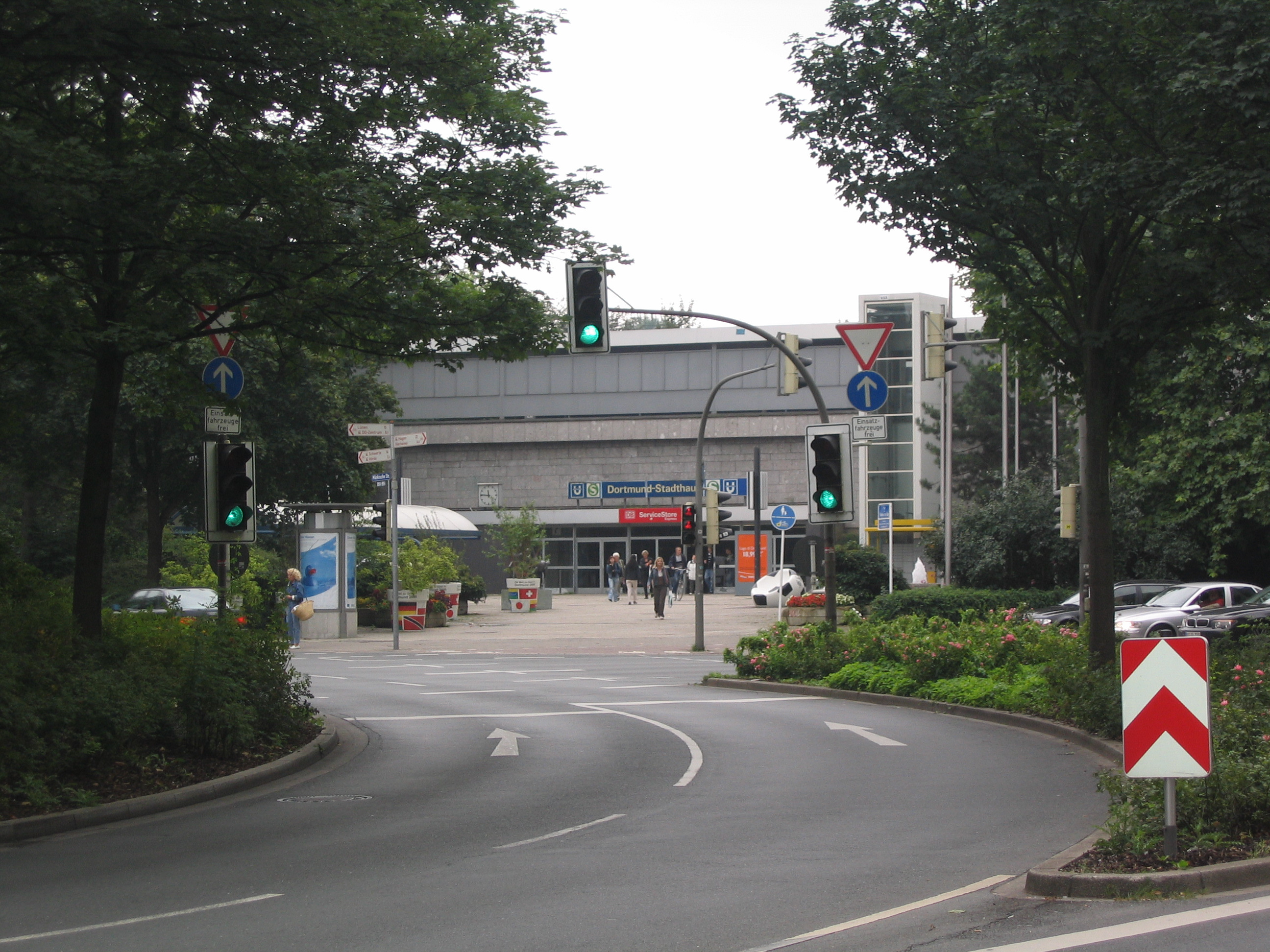

General information
- Location: Ruhrallee/Sonnenstr., Dortmund, North Rhine-Westphalia; Germany
- Coordinates: 51°30′28″N 7°28′08″E
- Owner: DB Netz
- Operator: DB Station&Service
- Lines: Lütgendortmund–Dortmund (KBS 450.4)
- Platforms: 2
- Train operators: DB Regio NRW

Construction
- Accessible: Yes

Other information
- Station code: 1292
- DS100 code: EDST
- IBNR: 8001520
- Category: 5
- Fare zone: VRR: 370
- Website: www.bahnhof.de

History
- Opened: 26 May 1963

Services
Preceding station	Rhine-Ruhr S-Bahn	Following station
DO Möllerbrücke towards DO-Lütgendortmund	S4	DO-Körne West towards Unna
Preceding station	Rhine-Ruhr Stadtbahn	Following station
Stadtgarten towards Brambauer Verkehrshof	U41	Markgrafenstraße towards Clarenberg
Stadtgarten towards Dortmund Hbf	U45	Markgrafenstraße towards Westfalenhallen
Stadtgarten towards Dortmund-Westerfilde	U47	Markgrafenstraße towards Aplerbeck
Stadtgarten towards Hafen	U49	Markgrafenstraße towards Hacheney
Location

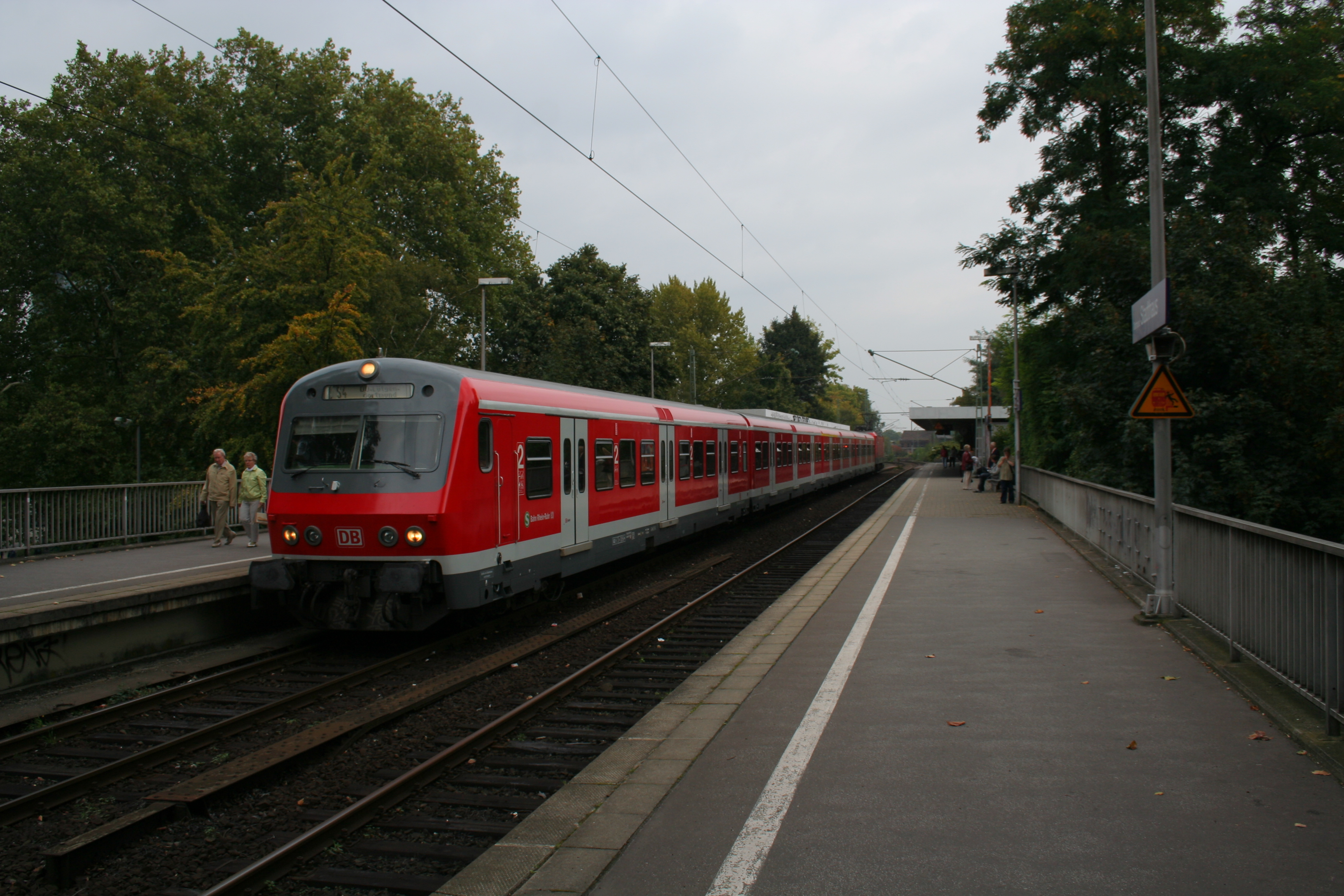
Dortmund Stadthaus station in 2009

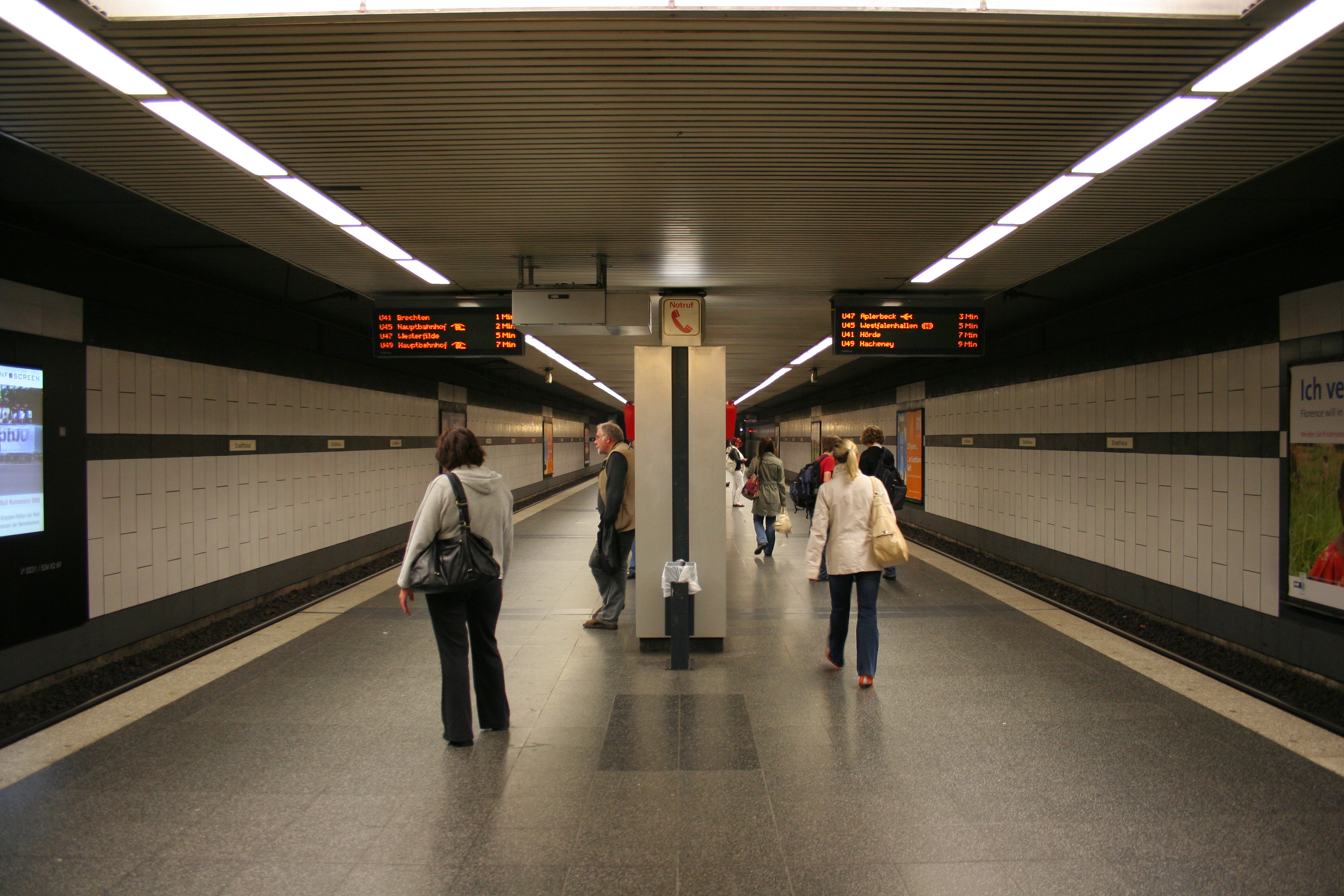
VRR underground station

Dortmund Stadthaus station is an important railway station of the inner city of Dortmund in the German state of North Rhine-Westphalia. It is located in the inner city at the junction of Ruhrallee (B54) and Märkischen Straße, near the Stadthaus, a municipal office building. It is classified by Deutsche Bahn as a category 5 station. The above-ground section of the station is served by line S4 of the Rhine-Ruhr S-Bahn, and the underground section is served by lines U41, U45, U47 and U49 of the Dortmund Stadtbahn.

== Service ==
Line S4 runs in the east–west direction from Unna to Dortmund-Luetgendortmund on above ground tracks through the station. The platforms are accessible by stairs and lifts. The underground section is served by lines U41, U45, U47 and U49, which run in a north–south direction. In addition, bus routes 400 and 401, operated by the municipal public transport company, Dortmunder Stadtwerke (DSW21), stop at the station, forming a loop around the city centre and a branch leading to Dortmund-Hörde station, with the bus stop located at Saarlandstraße.

== History ==
The station is on the historic Ruhr line of the Rhenish Railway Company and the Welver–Sterkrade railway of the Royal Westphalian Railway Company, in the immediate vicinity of the abandoned Dortmund Süd (south) station. Trains have stopped here since 26 May 1963. It was originally served by battery electric multiple units of class 515. It was served by Silberling carriages hauled by class 212 locomotives from 1980. Since 3 June 1984 run x-Wagen (“x-cars”, a type of push–pull train), initially propelled by class 111 locomotives and from 1995 by class 143 locomotives. In December 2011, line S4 was converted to operation by class 422 electric multiple units.

== Rail services ==
Dortmund Stadthaus station is served by Rhine-Ruhr S-Bahn line S 4 at 30-minute intervals.

Line	Route
S4	Dortmund-Lütgendortmund – Dortmund-Möllerbrücke - Dortmund-Stadthaus – Dortmund-Asseln Mitte - Unna-Königsborn – Unna

It is also served by lines U41, U45, U47 and U49 of the Dortmund Stadtbahn, all at 10-minute intervals.
