= Dortmund Möllerbrücke station =

Railway station in Dortmund, Germany

Dortmund Möllerbrücke
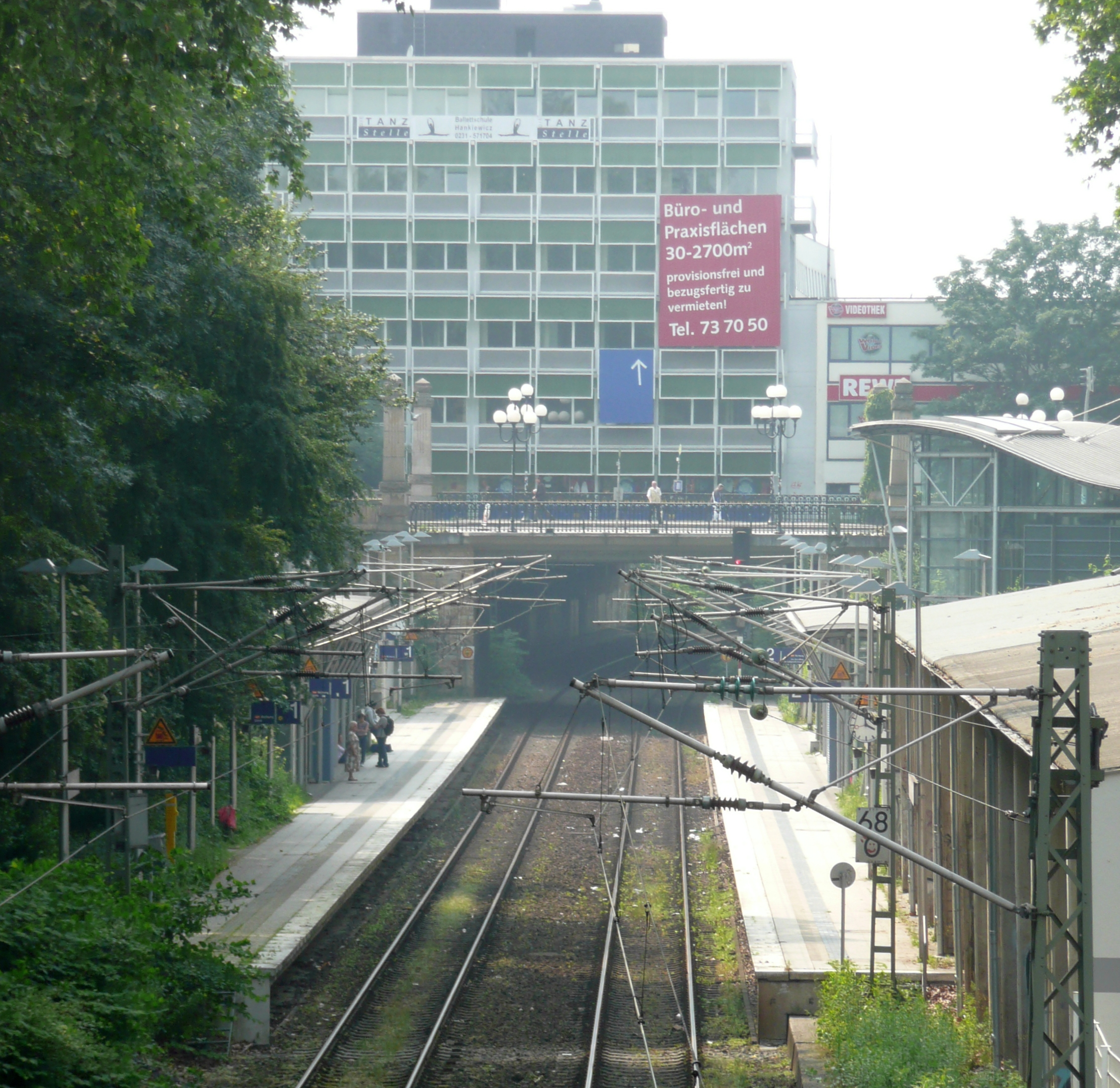
- Dortmund Möllerbrücke station in 2008

General information
- Location: Hollestr., Dortmund, NRW; Germany
- Coordinates: 51°30′26″N 7°27′07″E
- Lines: Lütgendortmund–Dortmund (KBS 450.4)
- Platforms: 2

Construction
- Accessible: Yes

Other information
- Station code: 1291
- DS100 code: EDMB
- IBNR: 8001518
- Category: 6
- Fare zone: VRR: 370
- Website: www.bahnhof.de

History
- Opened: 26 May 1963

Services
Preceding station	Rhine-Ruhr S-Bahn	Following station
Dortmund West towards DO-Lütgendortmund	S4	DO Stadthaus towards Unna
Preceding station	Rhine-Ruhr Stadtbahn	Following station
Kreuzstraße towards Grotenbachstraße	U42	Städtische Kliniken towards Grevel
Location

Dortmund Möllerbrücke station is a transportation hub to the southwest of the inner city of Dortmund, near the Kreuzviertel (district) and West Park. The station is named after the nearby Möller bridge (Möllerbrücke) and is classified by Deutsche Bahn as a category 5 station. The above ground section of the station is served by line S4 of the Rhine-Ruhr S-Bahn, and the underground section is served by line U42 of the Dortmund Stadtbahn. It is located on the historic Ruhr line of the Rhenish Railway Company.

== History ==
A block post was built on the site of today's S-Bahn station as early as 1910. There has been a tram stop at Dortmund Möllerbrücke since 1925. Trains have stopped since 26 May 1963. It was originally served by battery electric multiple units of class 515. It was served by Silberling carriages hauled by class 212 locomotives from 1980. Since 3 June 1984 x-Wagen (“x-cars”, a type of push–pull train) have operated, propelled initially by class 111 locomotives and from 1995 by class 143 locomotives. In December 2011, line S4 was converted to operation by class 422 electric multiple units.

== Architectural features ==
The Stadtbahn station was designed by the architects Kopka and Theil and opened in 2002. The design theme of the Stadtbahn station is "bridges", using materials made of Ruhr sandstone similar to the stone used to build the nearby Möller bridge.

== Rail services ==
Dortmund Möllerbrücke station is served by Rhine-Ruhr S-Bahn line S 4 at 20-minute intervals.

Line	Route
S4	Dortmund-Lütgendortmund – Dortmund-Möllerbrücke - Dortmund-Stadthaus – Dortmund-Asseln Mitte - Unna-Königsborn – Unna

It is also served by line U42 of the Dortmund Stadtbahn at 10-minute intervals.

Line	Route
U42	Dortmund-Grevel – Scharnhorst Zentrum – Kirchderne – Eving, Schulte Rödding – Reinoldikirche – Stadtgarten – Dortmund-Möllerbrücke – Barop Parkhaus – Hombruch, Grotenbachstraße

== Gallery ==
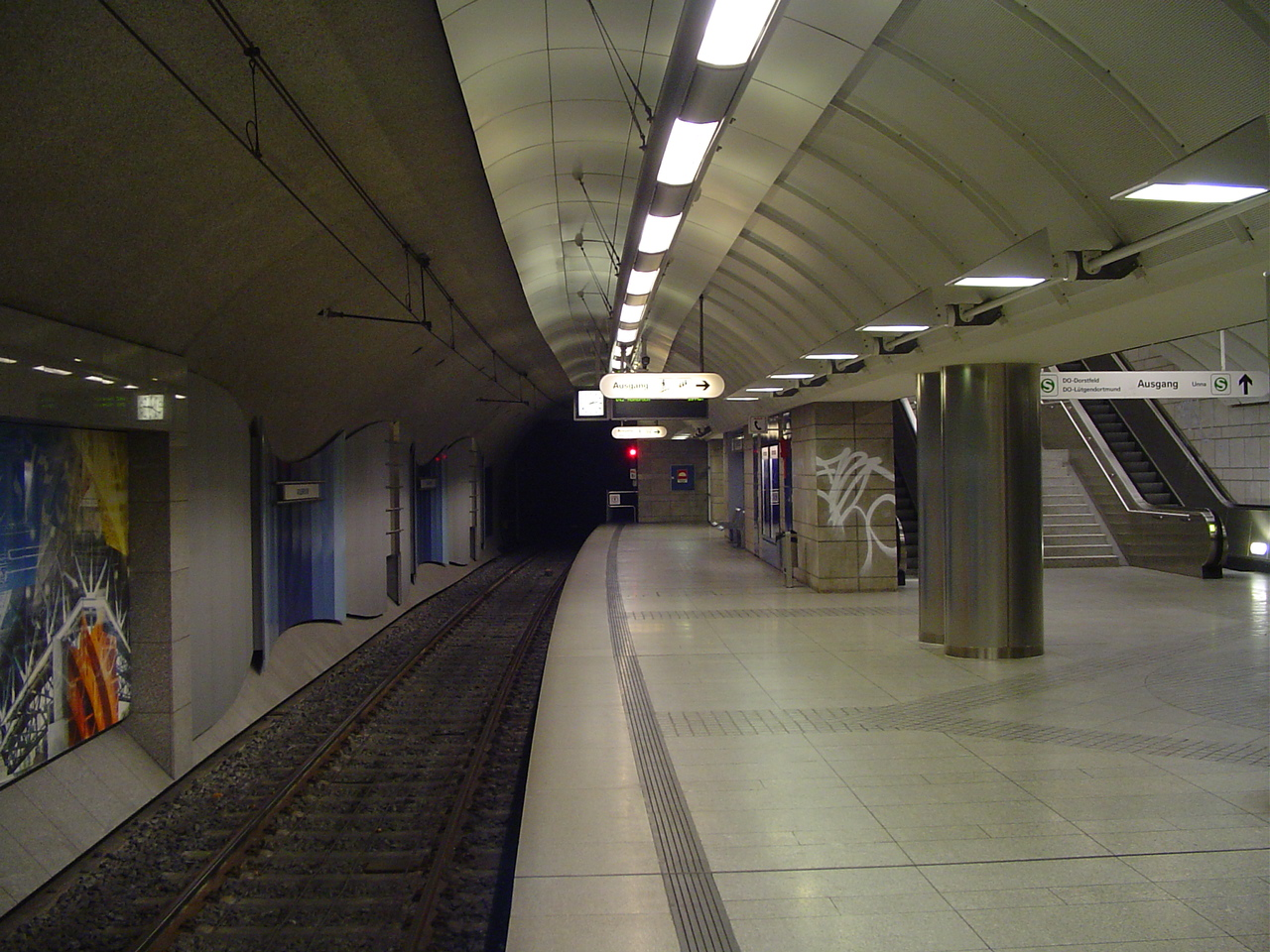
VRR underground station

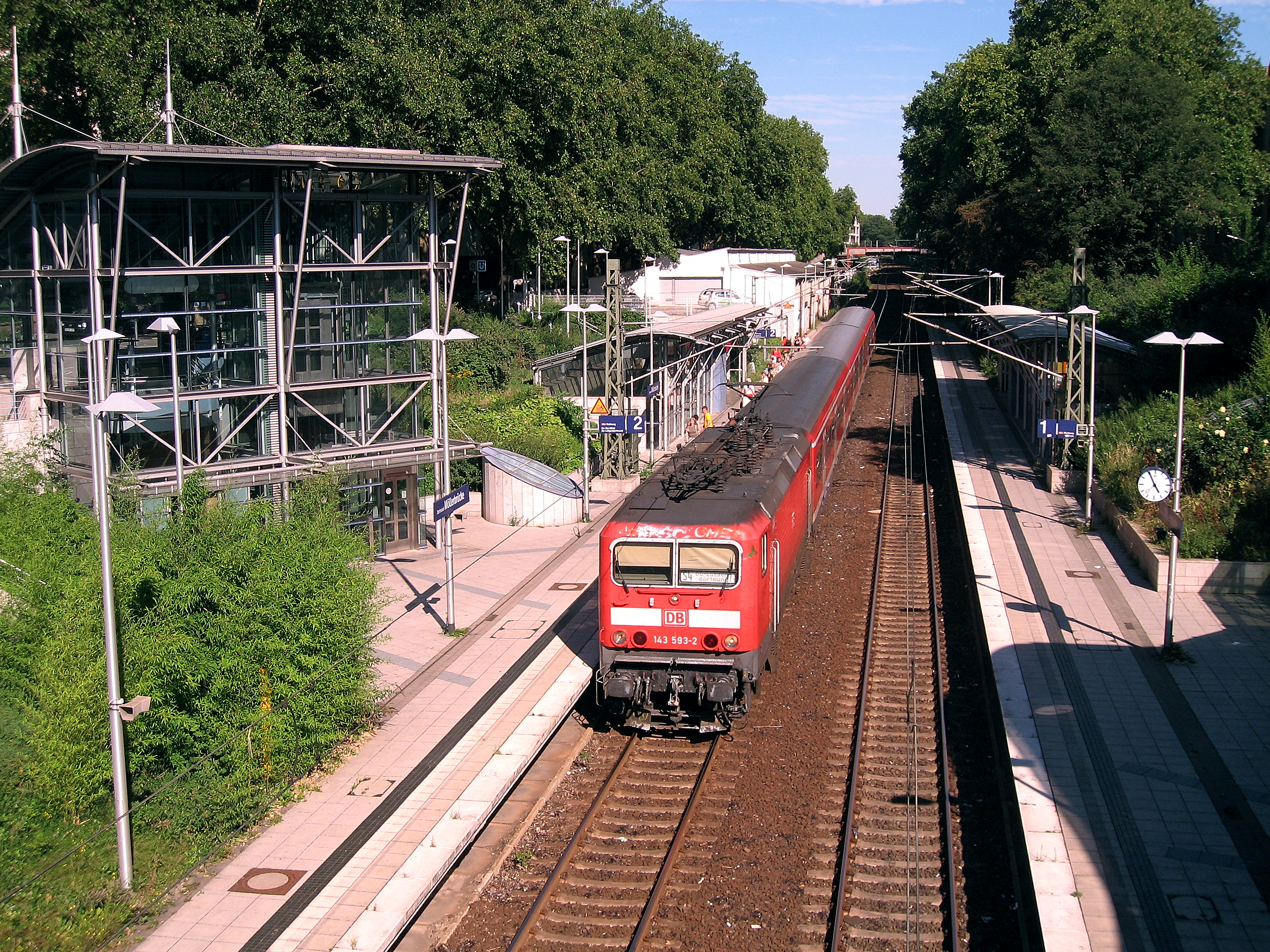
S-Bahn train in Möllerbrücke station

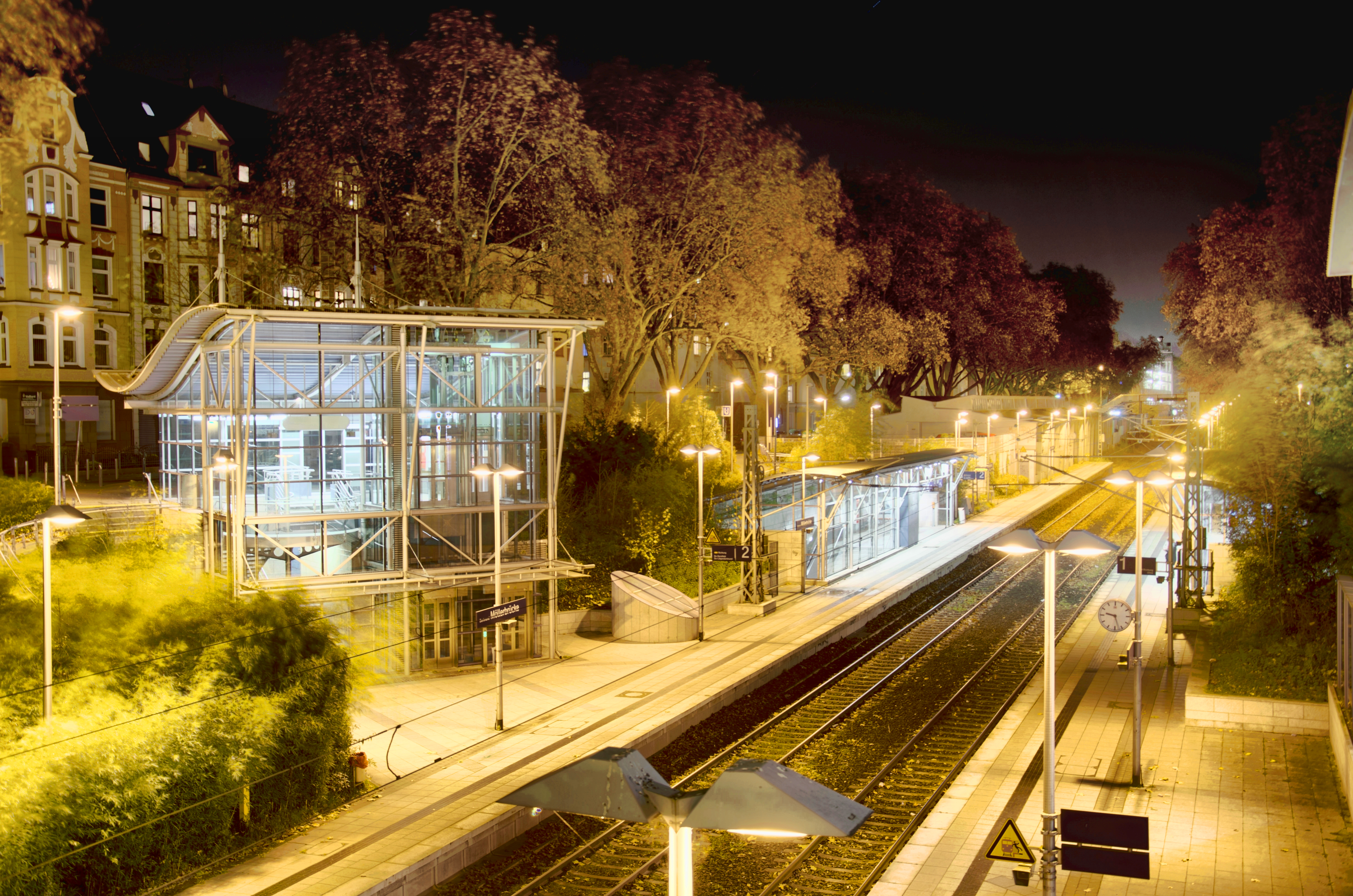
Night view of the S-Bahn station

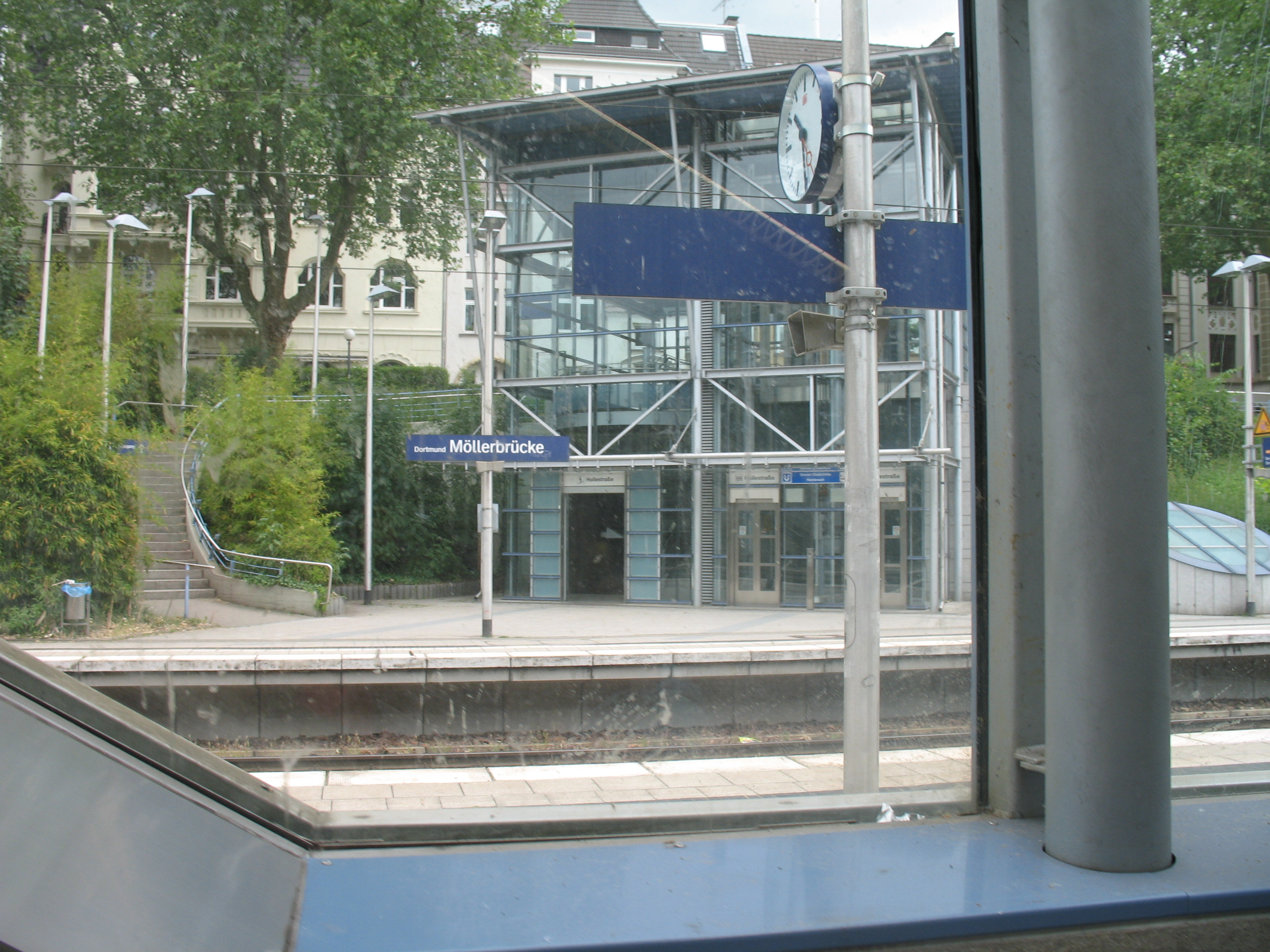
Access to the S-Bahn station
