= Westfalenhallen station =

Rapid transit station in Germany

Westfalenhallen
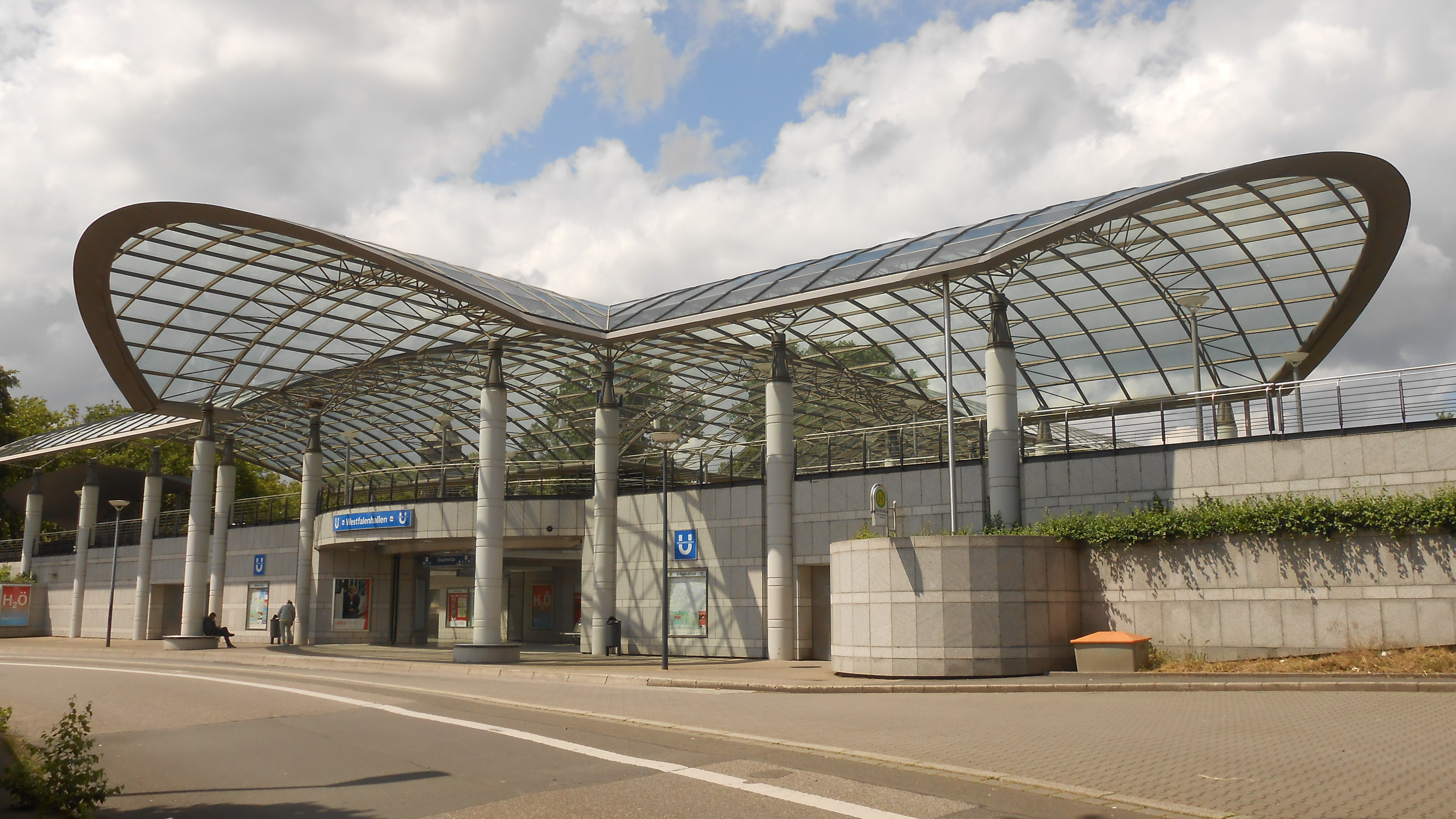
- The station exterior in 2016

General information
- Location: Dortmund, North Rhine-Westphalia; Germany
- Coordinates: 51°29′48″N 7°27′36″E
- Owner: Dortmunder Stadtwerke (DSW21)
- Line: Stammstrecke 2
- Platforms: 1 island platform
- Tracks: 2
- Train operators: Dortmunder Stadtwerke

Other information
- Fare zone: VRR: 372

Services
Preceding station	Rhine-Ruhr Stadtbahn	Following station
Remydamm towards Dortmund Hbf	U45	through to U46
through to U45	U46	Polizeipräsidium towards Brunnenstraße
Location

Westfalenhallen station (German: U-Bahnhof Westfalenhallen) is an underground rapid transit station in the city of Dortmund, in North Rhine-Westphalia, Germany. It is part of the Dortmund Stadtbahn network and serves the Westfalenhallen venues.

== Services ==
As of 2021, the following services stop at Westfalenhallen:

- U45: service every 10 minutes to Dortmund Hauptbahnhof.
- U46: service every 10 minutes to Brunnenstraße.
