= Dortmund Stadtbahn =

Light rail system in Dortmund, Germany

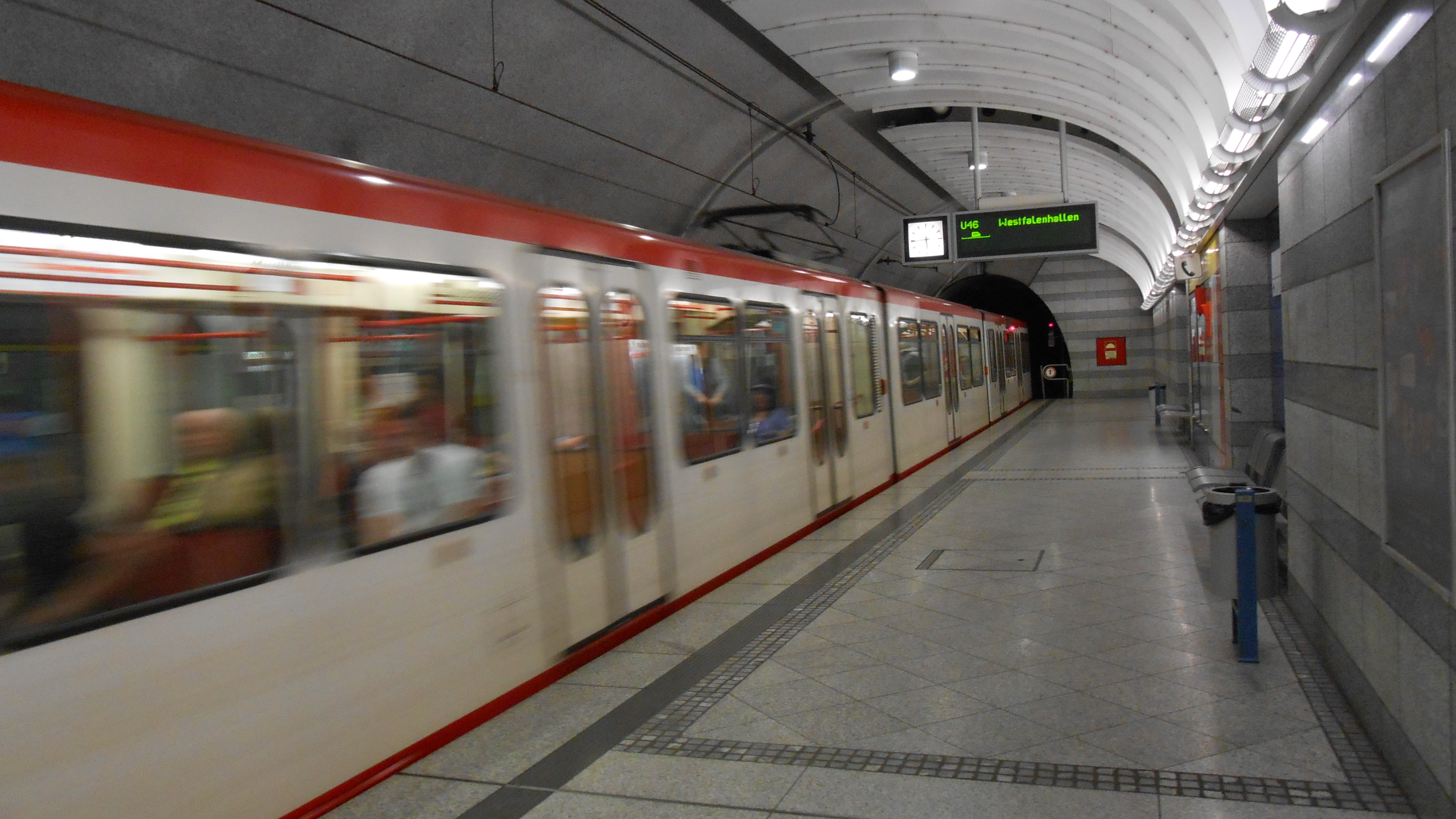

Overview
- Locale: Dortmund and Lünen, North Rhine-Westphalia, Germany
- Transit type: Light Rail (Stadtbahn)
- Number of lines: 8
- Number of stations: 82

Operation
- Began operation: 1 June 1881 (tram); 15 May 1976 (light rail)
- Ended operation: 26 April 2008 (tram)
- Operator: Dortmunder Stadtwerke AG (DSW21)
- Number of vehicles: 140 (B6: 43, B8: 21, B80D: 30, NGT8: 47)
- Train length: 28 meters (min); 84 meters (max)

Technical
- System length: 75.0 km (46.6 mi)
- Track gauge: 1,435 mm (4 ft 8 1/2 in) standard gauge
- Electrification: 750 V DC Overhead line
- Top speed: 80 km/h
System map
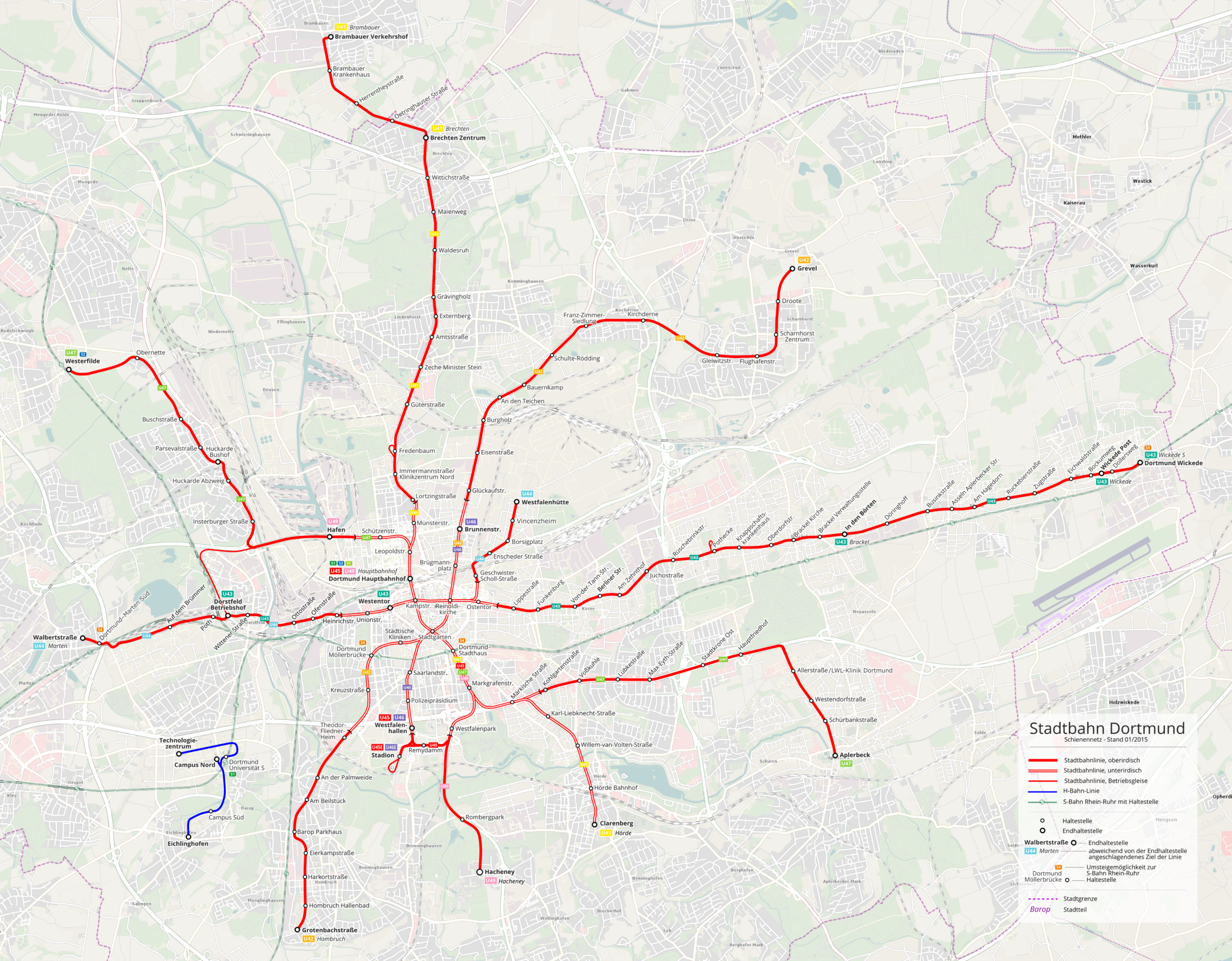

The Dortmund Stadtbahn is a light rail system in the German city of Dortmund and is integrated in the Rhine-Ruhr Stadtbahn network. Its network consists of eight lines and is operated by Dortmunder Stadtwerke, which is operating under the brand DSW21 since 2005.

The light rail system was gradually opened between 1976 and 2008 by relocating the inner-city tram tracks in underground tunnels and opening new express tram routes that are independent of road traffic (e.g. Kirchderne – Grevel). It operates on 75.0 kilometres (46.6 mi) of route (of which 20.5 kilometres (12.7 mi) are underground in tunnels, with the other 54.5 kilometres (33.9 mi) being above-ground in dedicated rights-of-way). It has 23 underground stations and 59 on the surface.

== Network ==
The system has eight Stadtbahn lines:

| Line | Route |
|---|---|
| U41 | Dortmund-Hörde – Lünen–Brambauer |
| U42 | Hombruch – Grevel |
| U43 | Dorstfeld – Wickede |
| U44 | Marten – Westfalenhütte |
| U45 | Westfalenhallen – Dortmund Hbf – (Fredenbaum) |
| U46 | Westfalenhallen – Brunnenstraße |
| U47 | Westerfilde – Aplerbeck |
| U49 | Hacheney – Dortmund Hbf – (Hafen) |

The U41 and U47 rail lines connect with bus 490, which travels to Dortmund Airport.

== Rolling stock ==
| Train type | Number of vehicles | Manufacturer | Years built | Operation (regular) | Lines | Notes |
|---|---|---|---|---|---|---|
| B80C; B6 (six-axle B-Wagen; high-floor) | 43 | Duewag, BBC | 1986–1993 | 1987–present | U41, U42, U45, U46, U47, U49 | All B6 cars will be completely refurbished in future. |
| B80C; B8 (eight-axle B-Wagen; high-floor) | 21 | Duewag, BBC, Adtranz | 1994–1999 | 1996–present | U41, U42 (occasionally), U45, U46, U47, U49 | The first ten B8 cars (344–354) were built from former B6 cars. All B8 trains will be completely refurbished in future, with No. 348 being the first refurbished car delivered in 2024. |
| B100S (six-axle B-Wagen; high-floor) | 13 (10 for passenger service, 3 for spare parts reservation) | Duewag, Kiepe | 1973–1974 | 2005–2024 | U42 | Former light rail vehicles from Bonn. Three cars were sold to the Dortmund Fire Department, while the remaining cars were scrapped in 2024. |
| B80D (six-axle B-Wagen; high-floor) | 34 | HeiterBlick, Kiepe | 2022–2027 | 2024– | U41, U42, U45, U46, U49 | New-built B-Wagen fleet equipped with three-phase traction motors; replacing B100S. |
| NGT8 (Bombardier Flexity Classic; low-floor) | 47 | Bombardier Transportation, Vossloh Kiepe | 2007–2013 | 2008–present | U43, U44 | |
| N8C (high-floor with step-entrance) | 54 | Duewag, BBC | 1978–1982 | 1979–2011 | Entire network | Partially sold to the Gdańsk tram network as of 2007. No. 902 (formerly No. 142) remained in Dortmund in use as a departmental vehicle. |
| GT8 (high-floor with step-entrance) | 91 | Duewag, Hansa Waggonbau, Kiepe | 1959–1974 | 1959–2001 | Entire network | Partially sold to Wuppertal, Karlsruhe, Hiroshima and Reșița. Three GT8 trains have been preserved: No. 76 (Hiroshima), No. 87 and No. 13 (Dortmund Local Transport Museum). |
| T4, B4 (high-floor with step-entrance) | 6, 6 | Duewag, Credé, Kiepe | 1953–1954, 1958 | 1954–1992 | Entire network | Six four-axle prototype tramcars (T4) based on the PCC model with six four-axle trailer cars (B4). No. 304 was converted into a departmental vehicle (No. 904) in 1982, which is currently being restored at the Dortmund Local Transport Museum. |
| GT4 (high-floor with step-entrance) | 27 | Hansa Waggonbau, Kiepe | 1954–1957 | 1955–1980 | Entire network | No. 431 was converted for railway operation in 1978 and is still in service around the Dortmund Local Transport Museum on the Hansa railway line. |

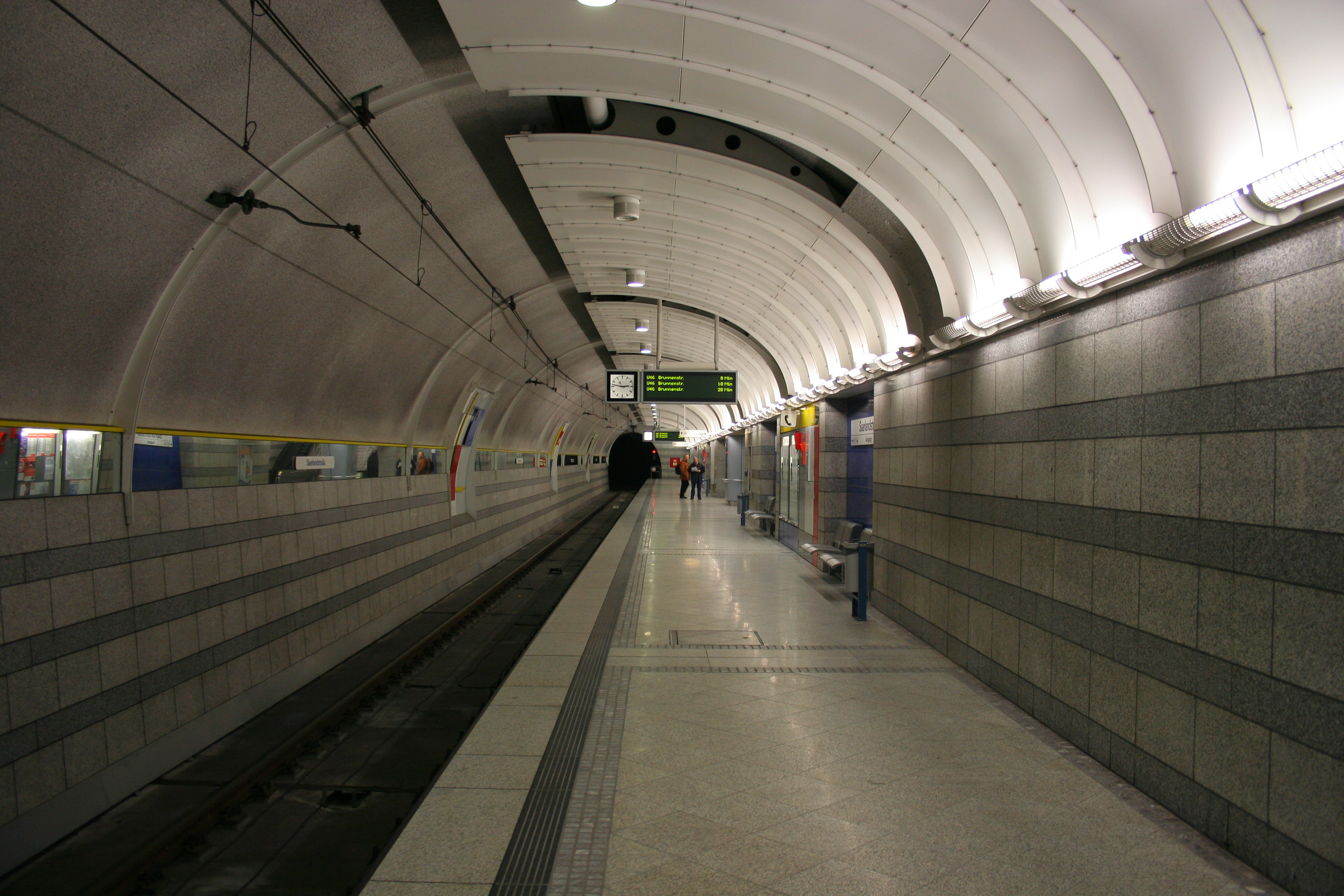
Underground station Saarlandstraße in 2010

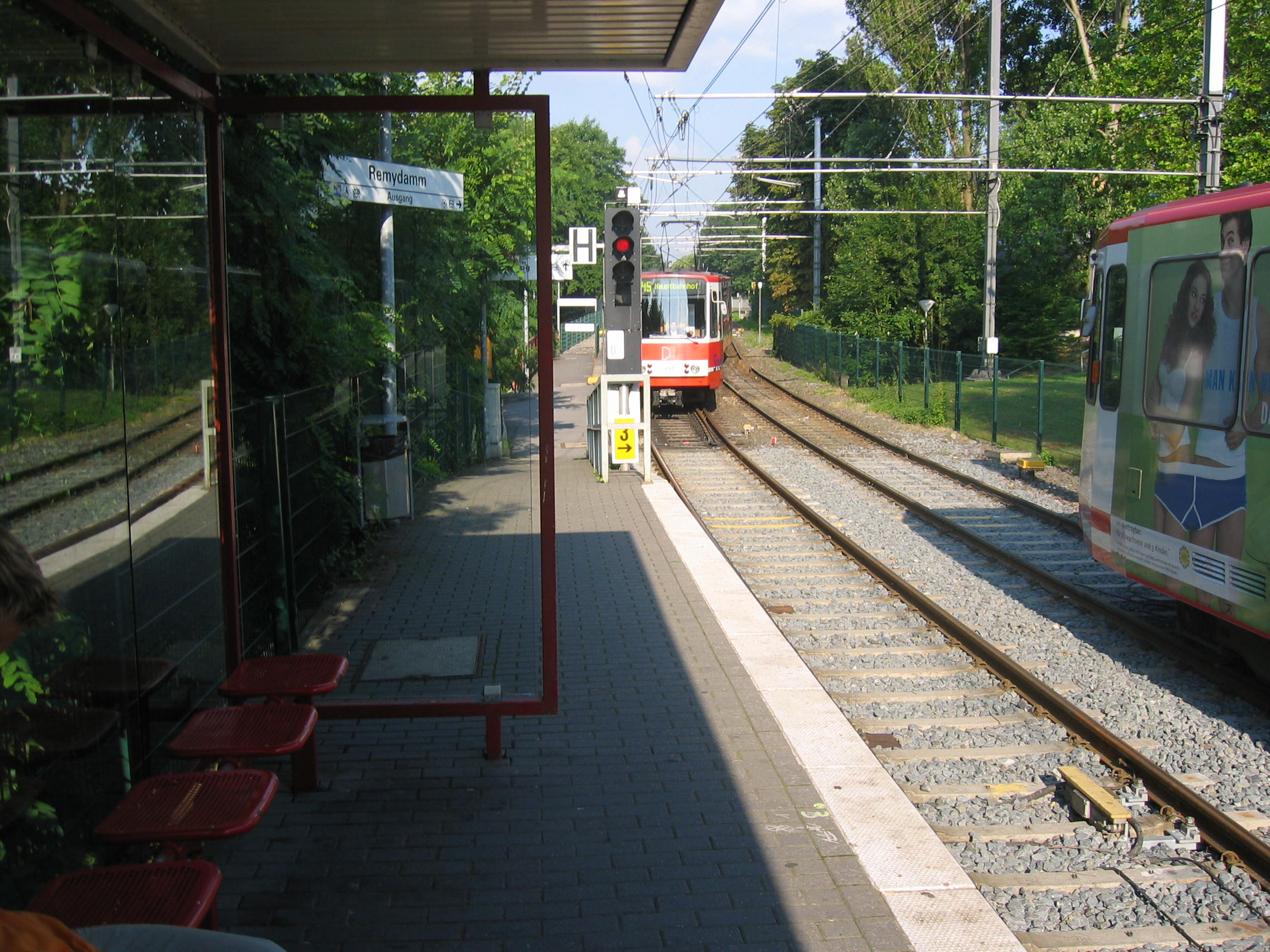
B80C trains at Remydamm station in 2005

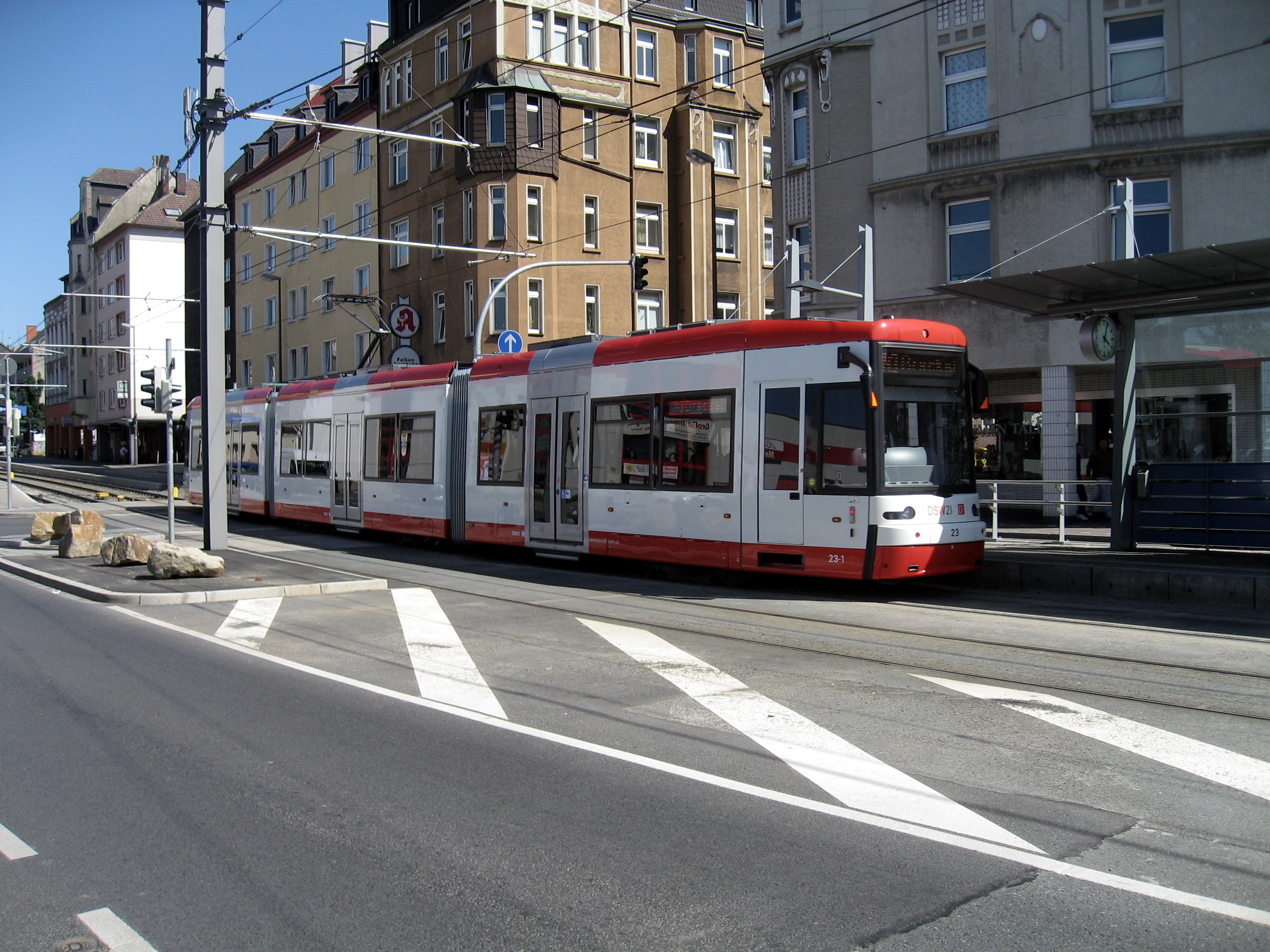
NGT8 train on line U43 in 2009

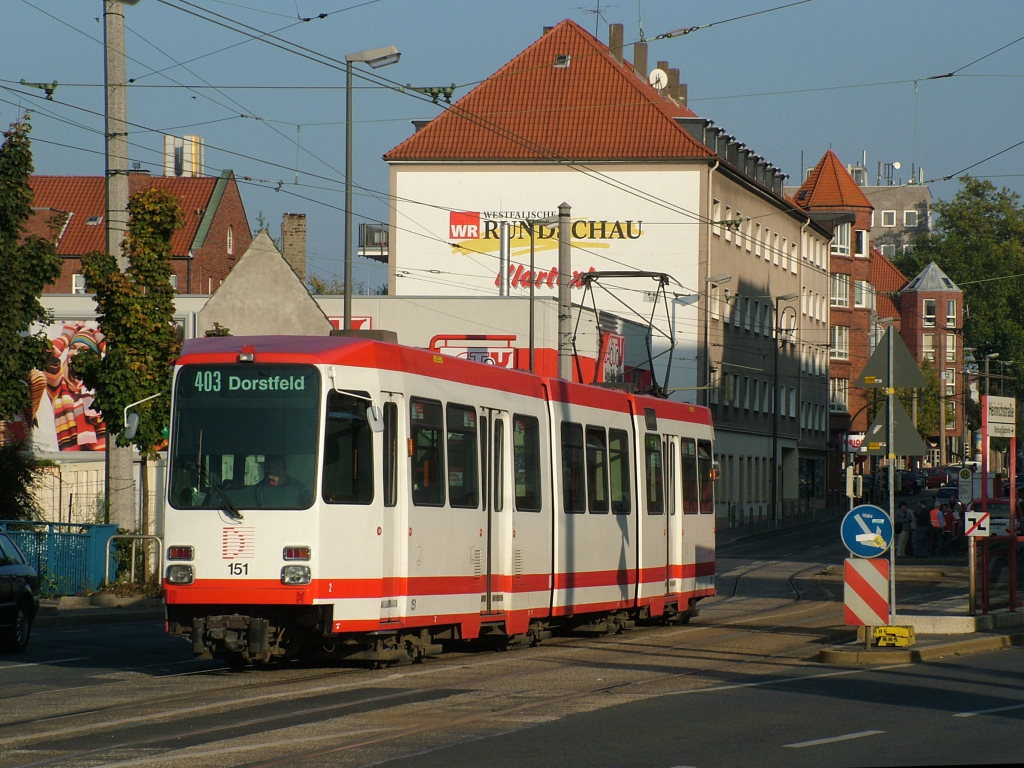
N8C train on former tram line 403 (today U43) in 2005

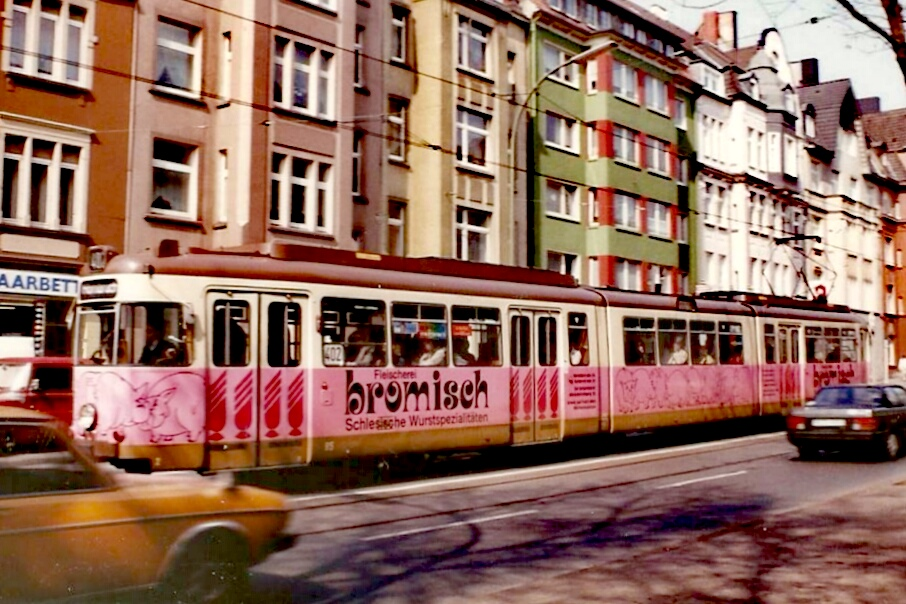
GT8 train on former tram line 402 (today U42) in 1992

== See also ==
- Verkehrsverbund Rhein-Ruhr
- List of rapid transit systems
