= Bochum Hauptbahnhof =

Railway station for the city of Bochum in western Germany

Bochum Hbf
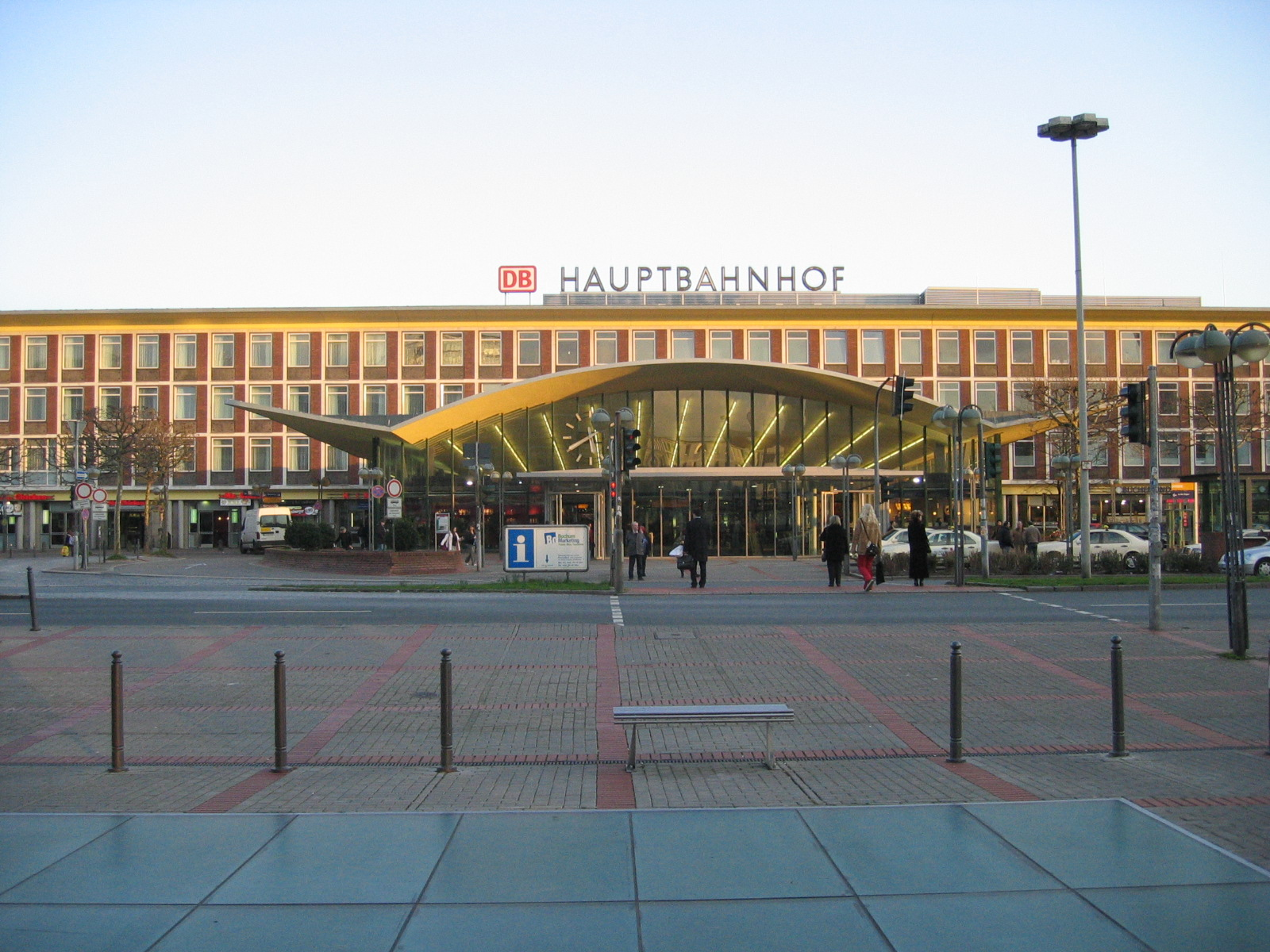
- Entrance of the station building

General information
- Location: Kurt-Schumacher-Platz 13-15, Bochum, NRW; Germany
- Coordinates: 51°28′43″N 7°13′22″E
- Owner: Deutsche Bahn
- Operator: DB Netz; DB Station&Service
- Lines: Witten/Dortmund–Oberhausen/Duisburg; Bochum–Gelsenkirchen
- Platforms: 8
- Connections: Trams in Bochum/Gelsenkirchen

Construction
- Accessible: Yes

Other information
- Station code: 724
- DS100 code: EBO
- IBNR: 8000041
- Category: 2
- Fare zone: VRR: 360
- Website: www.bahnhof.de

History
- Opened: 1957

Services
Preceding station	DB Fernverkehr	Following station
Essen Hbf towards Köln Hbf	ICE 10	Dortmund Hbf towards Berlin Ostbahnhof
Essen Hbf towards Aachen Hbf	ICE 14	Dortmund Hbf towards Berlin Ostbahnhof
Essen Hbf towards München Hbf	ICE 41	Dortmund Hbf Terminus
Essen Hbf towards München Hbf	ICE 42	Dortmund Hbf Terminus
Essen Hbf towards Basel SBB	ICE 43	Dortmund Hbf towards Hamburg-Altona
Essen Hbf towards Stuttgart Hbf	ICE 47	Dortmund Hbf Terminus
Essen Hbf towards Köln Hbf	IC 51	Dortmund Hbf towards Gera Hbf
Essen Hbf towards Dortmund Hbf	IC 55 Allgäu	Dortmund Hbf towards Oberstdorf
Essen Hbf towards Dortmund Hbf	ICE 62 Bodensee	Dortmund Hbf towards Innsbruck Hbf
Essen Hbf towards Wien Hbf	ICE 91	Dortmund Hbf towards Hamburg-Altona
Preceding station	National Express Germany	Following station
Wattenscheid towards Aachen Hbf	RE 1 (NRW-Express)	Dortmund Hbf towards Hamm (Westf) Hbf
Wattenscheid towards Cologne/Bonn Airport	RE 6 (Rhein-Weser-Express)	Dortmund Hbf towards Minden
Wattenscheid towards Düsseldorf Hbf	RE 11 (Rhein-Hellweg-Express)	Dortmund Hbf towards Kassel-Wilhelmshöhe
Preceding station	DB Regio NRW	Following station
Wattenscheid towards Essen Hbf	RB 40	Witten Hbf towards Hagen Hbf
Bochum-West towards Haltern am See	RE 41	Terminus
Preceding station	VIAS	Following station
Wattenscheid towards Essen Hbf	RE 16	Witten Hbf towards Iserlohn
Bochum-West towards Gelsenkirchen Hbf	RB 46	Terminus
Preceding station	Rhine-Ruhr S-Bahn	Following station
B-Ehrenfeld towards Solingen Hbf	S1	B-Langendreer West towards Dortmund Hbf

Other services
Preceding station	Bochum Stadtbahn	Following station
Bochum Rathaus towards Schloß Strünkede	U35	Oskar-Hoffmann-Straße towards Hustadt
Location

Bochum Hauptbahnhof is a railway station for the city of Bochum in western Germany. In its current incarnation, it was built from 1955 to 1957 and is one of the most notable 1950s railway stations in Germany. The station underwent extensive remodeling and modernisation from 2004 to 2006 and was officially reopened on 29 May 2006.

== History ==
The old station was opened in 1860 as the Bochum station of the Bergisch-Märkische Railway Company as part of its Witten/Dortmund–Oberhausen/Duisburg railway opened between 1860 and 1862, which was the first line built through the city of Bochum.

It was located on the south-western edge of the historic centre, in the northern part of the emerging city of Bochum-Ehrenfeld, and was well-located near the important heavy industries such as the steel mills of Bochumer Verein and various collieries. Access to the station for passengers was not ideal and the space was inadequate for the increasing volume of traffic and was constrained by the construction of the rail triangle between the main line and the branch line to Herne-Rottbruch that opened in 1870 as well as the nearby Königsallee arterial road.

After the nationalisation of the large railway companies by the Prussian state, the Bergisch-Märkisch station's name was changed to Bochum Süd to differentiate it from the Rhenish Railway Company's station to the east of the inner city, which was renamed Bochum station. The latter was subsequently renamed Bochum Nord and became a freight yard only in the early 21st century. Bochum Süd was eventually renamed as Bochum Hauptbahnhof.

=== Old station ===
The original Bochum Hauptbahnhof was located at Königsallee, a few hundred metres west of the present railway station. In the Second World War, the station was virtually destroyed in a British bombing raid, along with large parts of the city of Bochum. The reconstruction of the station was required by the city planners enable for changes in the design of the city and for the development of some major roads to cater for a significant increase in the population of the city. Reconstruction of the old station, which was difficult to expand, was abandoned in favour of the development of a station closer to the central city.

=== New station ===
The central point of the reorganisation and reconstruction of the city was the relocation of the station by about 650 metres to the east from the outskirts of the city to a more favourable location near the major institutions of the city. Other locations were considered for the new station. A search was made for a place that was centrally located and offered enough space for a tram and bus terminal. The present location was selected after careful consideration of all aspects.

The construction of the station was also the basis for changes to the urban transport system. The entire road network was focussed on the railway station. Public transport would be able to run faster, because it is situated on two roads leading south and is connected by the inner ring to all other arterial roads.

The new station was intended to give visitors an impression of Bochum as a city open for business. Thus, high-quality shops were located nearby, for instance in the Huestraße, which connects the station and the city centre with all major city facilities. Vocational schools, industry and commerce, the management of public utilities and the main post office are nearby. It has become a transportation hub, connecting the Stadtbahn (which was opened later), tram and rail transport. The central bus station was built in the square in front of the station.

=== The construction ===
Following council approval of the project in June 1953, construction began in February 1954. The project involved both the building of new railway facilities and the construction of the new station building. All the tracks and signals had to be connected to a newly built signal box, which was one of the most modern relay interlocking systems of the time. Rail services were maintained throughout the work. A total of 250,000 cubic metres of soil was moved in order to allow the railway embankment to be raised by more than 4 metres over 2.1 km.

The current location of the railway facilities was formerly occupied by the Scharpenseel Brewery, which was destroyed in the war. Next to it on a hill were allotments and a cemetery, which had Christian and Jewish graves. The approximately 800 graves were moved and the hill was removed.

First, the large structures were built. These were two underpasses under ten tracks, two platform bridges, tunnels for passengers, baggage and mail between the platforms and the station building and the retaining wall. A war-time air-raid shelter was discovered under the site, with benches and chairs as well as shoes and clothes that had been forgotten after the last all-clear had been given.

=== The station building ===
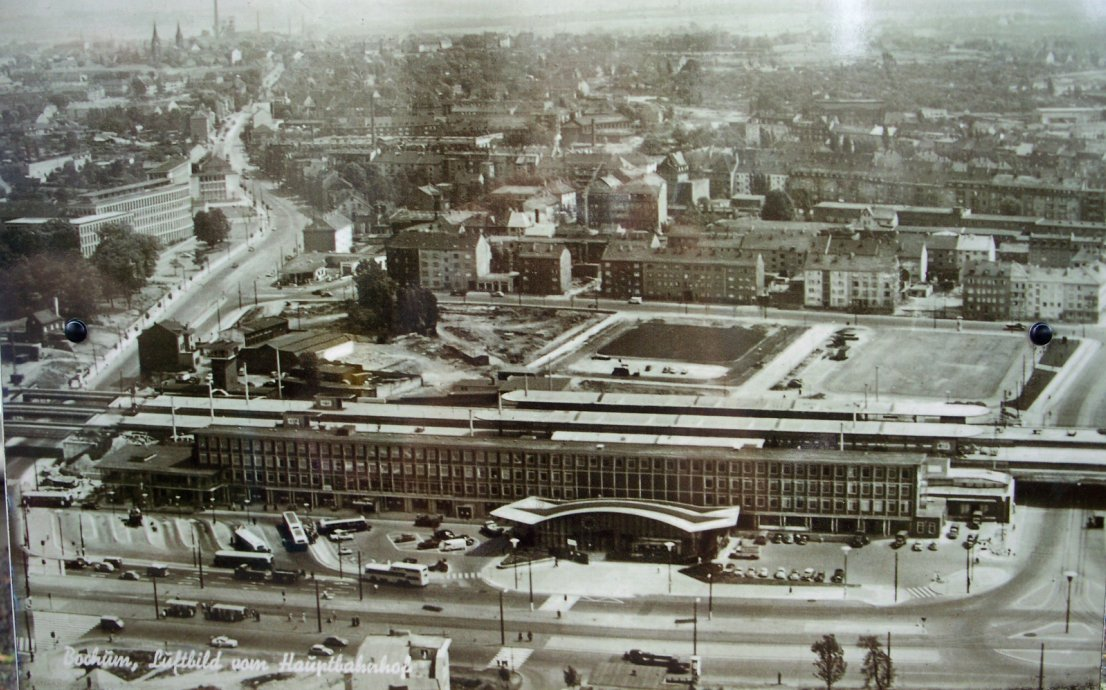
Aerial view of the new station in the late 1950s

The cornerstone of the station building was laid in February 1954. On 12 October 1955, the ceremonial groundbreaking was held for the reception building. The space for the building was limited by the converging roads and railway tracks. The architect H. Ruhl, then only 22 years old, had to make use of very narrow and long plot.

An initial plan envisaged the construction of a glass roof over the entrance hall and a helipad on top of the building. This was regarded by the city planners and the railway department as too futuristic, and they chose its present form.

==== Northern side building ====
The 34,000 cubic metres of enclosed space built on the northern side was far more than required for railway administration. It was planned to house a hotel, a cafe and cinema. These were at that time new ways of using a station. The elevated glazed structure of the station cafe is supported by columns and protrudes from the main building.

==== Entrance hall ====
The rather monotonous and massive, but light main building is complemented by the bold sweep of the butterfly-shaped canopy. This may have been inspired by the Roma Termini railway station. The roof has a width of 46.50 metres and a depth of 24 metres. Despite its weight of 600 tons, it appears graceful and it makes a successful contrast with the main building.

==== Southern side building ====
In the southern side building are facilities for handling luggage and express freight. In the floors above there are railway offices. The entire main building is four floors, with a length of 146 metres, a depth of 14.4 metres and a building volume of 34,000 m³.

The building was built from 1954 to 1957 under the leadership of Wilhelm Bangen. On 30 May 1957, it went into provisional operation. At 4.25 AM, the first train ran. Three days later, on 2 June 1957, Bochum celebrated the electrification of the line with the Minister of Transport, Seebohm.

=== Renovation ===
The opening of the station in 1957 was followed, in the late 1970s, by its first major renovation. This consisted of three elements:

- Construction of Rhine-Ruhr S-Bahn line S 1. This used the southernmost of four platforms, which was rebuilt with two platform faces, numbered 7 and 8. Track 7 had previously been used by freight trains and had no platform edge.
- Construction of the curve connecting to the line to Herne. Until 1979, trains on the Bochum-Langendreer–Herne route ran via Bochum Nord station. Following the construction of the Riemke curve these services ran through Bochum Hauptbahnhof from 1979. The Bochum–Langendreer section became part of the S-Bahn in 1983. A short bay platform was built as the most northerly platform of the station, so the terminating services from the northern branch do not get in the way of movements by freight trains on track 2.
- Construction of underground Bochum Stadtbahn line. This involved the construction of an underground station on three levels below the station building and a two storey above ground building in Kurt-Schumacher-Platz. During the restoration of the forecourt, the central bus station was redesigned and the appearance of the station entrance was changed with the introduction of a stairway down to the upper distribution level of the Stadtbahn. In the course of this redevelopment the back entrance and Buddenberg place were also completely rebuilt.

In 2004 to 2006, the station building was extensively renovated including the access to its facilities and platforms. The official opening of the renovated station was on 29 May 2006. The station forecourt is currently being modernised again.

=== Katholikentag station ===
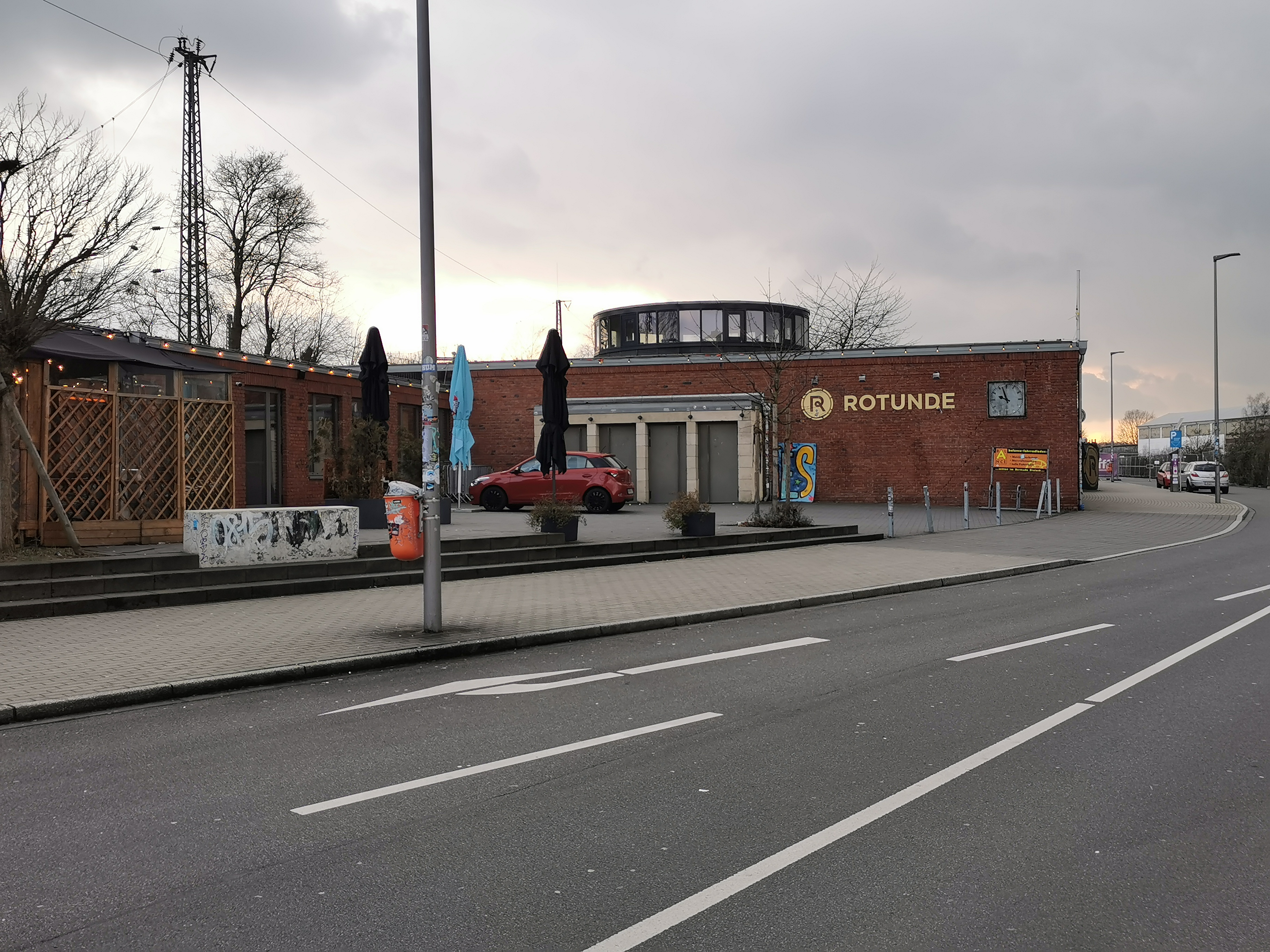
Katholikentag station

To leave the site of the new Hauptbahnhof at its present site as undisturbed as possible, a temporary station was established to replace the destroyed building in time for the German Katholikentag of 1949. After the opening of the current station it was used until about 1994 by Deutsche Bundesbahn as a training facility. It is now heritage-listed building. Since some years it is used as an event location.

== Operational usage ==
Regional and long-distance trains call at the station. It is integrated into the InterCityExpress network, although some trains do not call at Bochum, especially so called "UrlaubsExpress" trains with destinations at German resorts, usually used by tourists only.

=== Long distance trains ===
In the 2026 timetable, the following long-distance services stop at the station:

Line	Route	Frequency	Operator
ICE 10	Cologne – Düsseldorf – Duisburg – Essen – Bochum – Dortmund – Hamm – Bielefeld – Hanover – Wolfsburg – Berlin – Berlin Ostbahnhof	Hourly	DB Fernverkehr
ICE 14	Aachen – Cologne – Düsseldorf – Essen – Bochum – Dortmund – Hamm – Bielefeld – Hanover – Berlin – Berlin Ostbahnhof	Four times a day	DB Fernverkehr
ICE 41	Dortmund – Bochum – Essen – Duisburg – Düsseldorf – Cologne – Frankfurt (Main) – Würzburg – Nuremberg – Munich	Some trains	DB Fernverkehr
ICE 42	Dortmund – Bochum – Essen – Duisburg – Düsseldorf – Cologne – Frankfurt Airport – Mannheim – Stuttgart – Munich	120 min	DB Fernverkehr
ICE 43	Hamburg-Altona – Hamburg – Bremen – Osnabrück – Münster – Dortmund – Bochum – Essen – Duisburg – Düsseldorf – Cologne – Frankfurt Airport – Mannheim – Karlsruhe – Freiburg – Basel	120 min	DB Fernverkehr
ICE 47	Dortmund – Bochum – Essen – Duisburg – Düsseldorf – Köln Messe/Deutz – Frankfurt Airport – Mannheim – Stuttgart	Some trains	DB Fernverkehr
IC 51	Düsseldorf/Cologne – Essen – Bochum – Dortmund – Kassel – Eisenach – Erfurt – Weimar – Jena West – Jena-Göschwitz – Gera	2 train pairs	DB Fernverkehr
IC 55	Dortmund – Bochum – Essen – Duisburg – Düsseldorf – Cologne – Bonn – Koblenz – Mannheim Hbf – Stuttgart Hbf – Ulm Hbf – Oberstdorf	1 train pair	DB Fernverkehr
ICE 62	Dortmund – Bochum – Essen – Duisburg – Düsseldorf – Köln Messe/Deutz – Frankfurt Airport – Mannheim – Heidelberg – Stuttgart – Ulm – Friedrichshafen Stadt – Lindau-Reutin – Bregenz – St. Anton – Innsbruck	1 train pair	DB Fernverkehr
ICE 91	Hamburg – Hamburg-Harburg – Bremen – Münster – Dortmund – Bochum – Essen – Duisburg – Düsseldorf – Cologne – Bonn – Koblenz – Mainz – Frankfurt Airport – Frankfurt – Würzburg – Nuremberg – Regensburg – Passau – Linz – Vienna	240 min	DB Fernverkehr

=== Regional trains ===
In the 2026 timetable, the following regioanal services stop at the station:

Line	Line name	Route	Frequency
RE 1	NRW-Express	Aachen – Cologne – Düsseldorf – Duisburg – Essen – Bochum – Dortmund – Hamm (Westf)	60 min
RE 6	Rhein-Weser-Express	Cologne/Bonn Airport – Cologne – Neuss – Düsseldorf – Duisburg – Essen – Bochum – Dortmund – Hamm (Westf) – Bielefeld – Minden (Westf)	60 min
RE 11	Rhein-Hellweg-Express	Düsseldorf – Duisburg – Essen – Bochum – Dortmund – Hamm (Westf) (– Paderborn – Kassel-Wilhelmshöhe)	60 min
RE 16	Ruhr-Lenne-Express	Essen – Bochum – Witten – Hagen – Letmathe – Iserlohn	60 min
RB 40	Ruhr-Lenne-Bahn	Essen – Bochum – Witten – Hagen	60 min
RE 41	Vest-Ruhr-Express	Bochum – Recklinghausen – Marl-Sinsen – Haltern am See	60 min
RB 46	Glückauf-Bahn	Gelsenkirchen – Wanne-Eickel – Bochum	Mon–Fri: 30 min; Sat and Sun: 60 min
S1	S-Bahn Rhein-Ruhr	Dortmund (1) – Bochum – Essen (2) – Mülheim – Duisburg – Düsseldorf Airport – Düsseldorf (3) – Hilden – Solingen (4)	15 min (1–2), 30 min (2–3), 20 min (3–4)

=== Light rail (Stadtbahn) ===
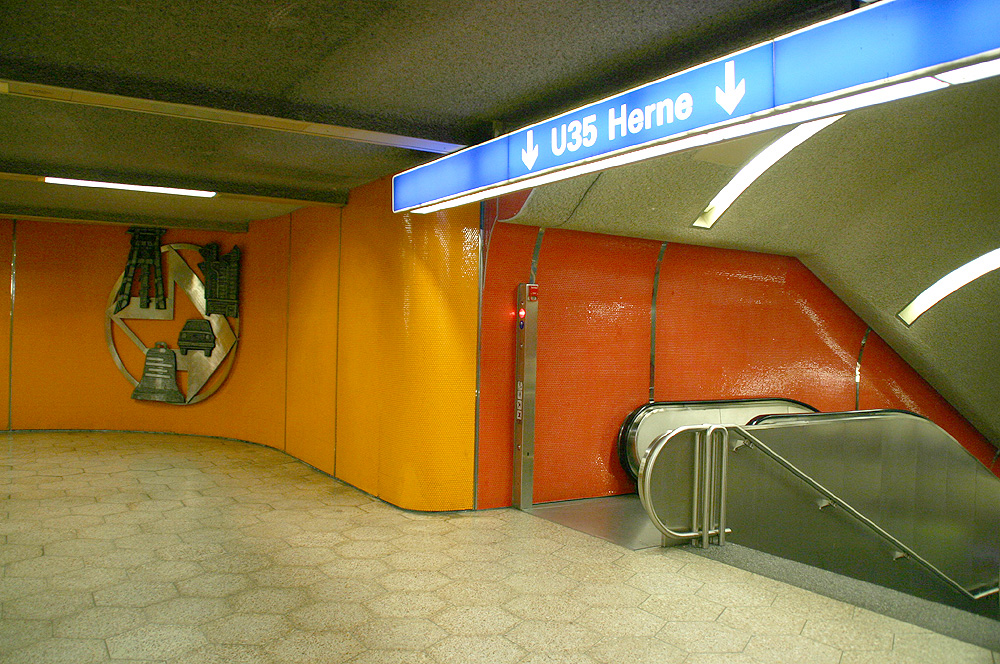
Entrance to U35 to Herne

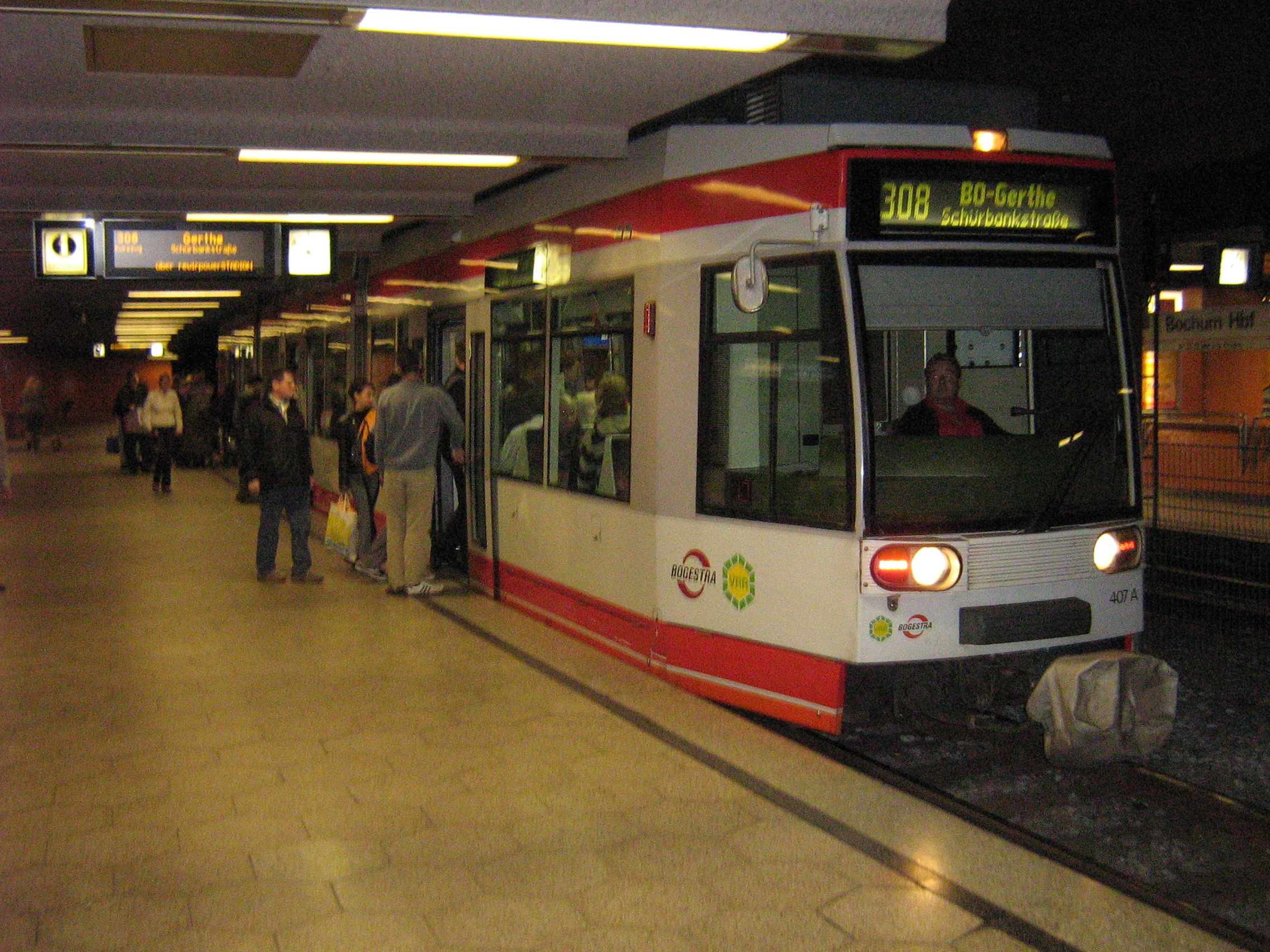
Upper level: platform for 306, 308, 316 and 318 lines

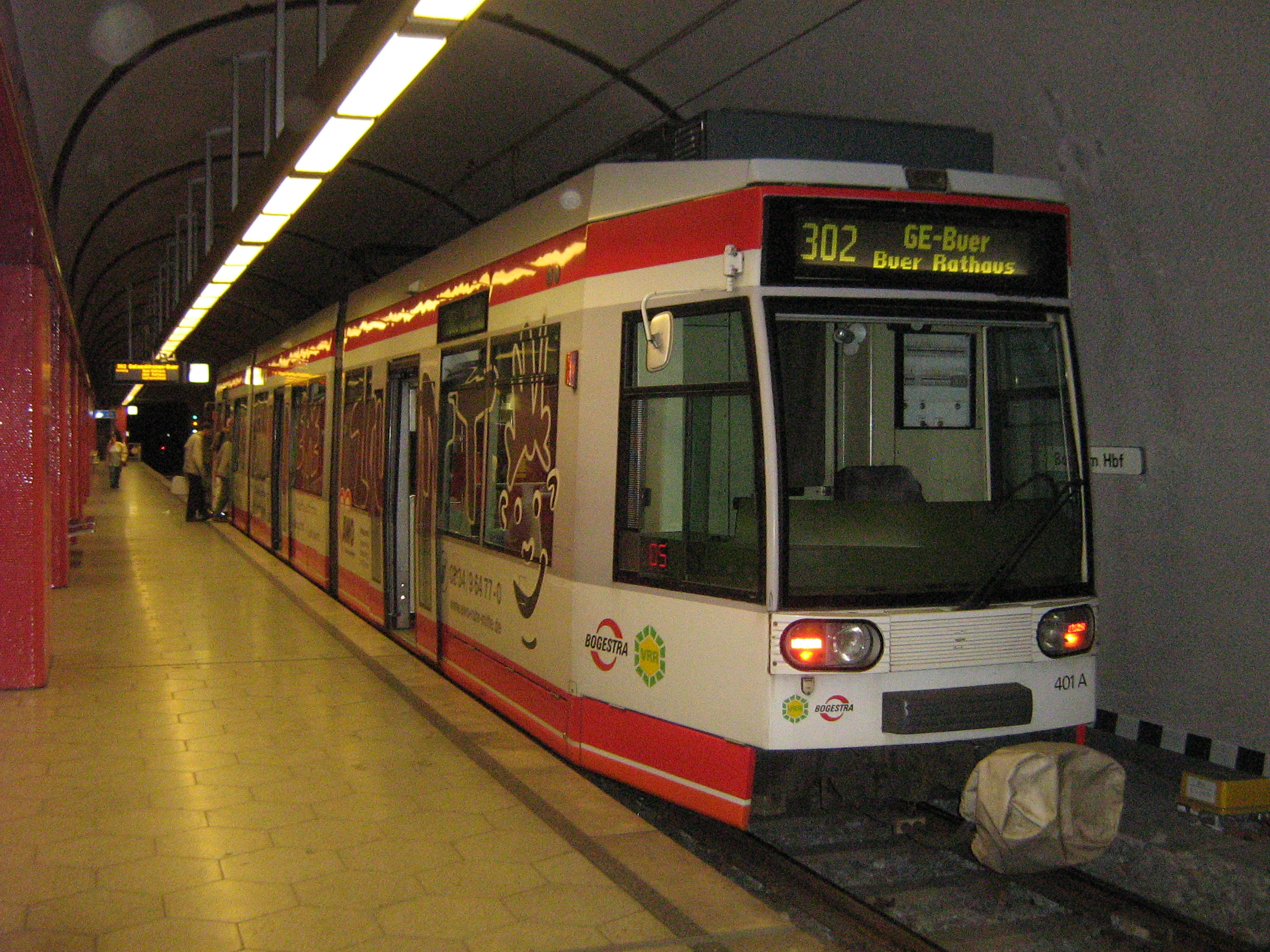
Lower level: platform for 302, 305, 310 and U35 lines

The six-track Bochum Stadtbahn station under Bochum Hauptbahnhof is the most important junction of the six lines of the Bochum network. The first underground level (ground-1) is a distributor level. On the second (ground-2) are the side platforms for the two narrow gauge lines, operated as the lines 306, 308, 316 and 318. On the third level (ground-3) are the tracks for lines U 35, 302, 305 and 310. Bochum Hauptbahnhof is the important station in the network, as it is the only underground station where one can change to all lines, except 301 (which only operates around Gelsenkirchen) and 309 (Bochum Langendreer to Witten).

Line	Route
U 35	Bochum-Querenburg Hustadt – Ruhr-Universität – Bochum Hbf – Riemke – Herne station – Schloss Strünkede
302	Gelsenkirchen-Buer Rathaus – Gelsenkirchen Hbf – Bochum Hbf – Laer Mitte - Bochum Langendreer S
305	Bochum-Höntrop Kirche – Bochum Hbf – Laer Mitte - Bochum Langendreer S
306	Bochum Hbf – Hamme – Wanne-Eickel Hbf
308	Bochum-Gerthe Schürbankstraße – Bochum Hbf – Weitmar – Linden – Hattingen Mitte
310	Bochum-Höntrop Kirche – Bochum Hbf – Langendreer - Witten Rathaus – Heven Dorf
316	Bochum-Gerthe Heinrichstraße – Bochum Hbf – Hamme – Wanne-Eickel Hbf
318	Bochum-Gerthe Schürbankstraße – Bochum Hbf – Weitmar – Linden – Dahlhausen Bf

== See also ==
- Rail transport in Germany
- Railway stations in Germany
