= Riemke =

Riemke may refer to:

- Riemke (Bochum), district of Bochum, North Rhine-Westphalia, Germany
- Alwin Riemke (1910–2009), German soccer goalkeeper
