= Bochum-West station =

Railway station in North Rhine-Westphalia, Germany

Bochum-West
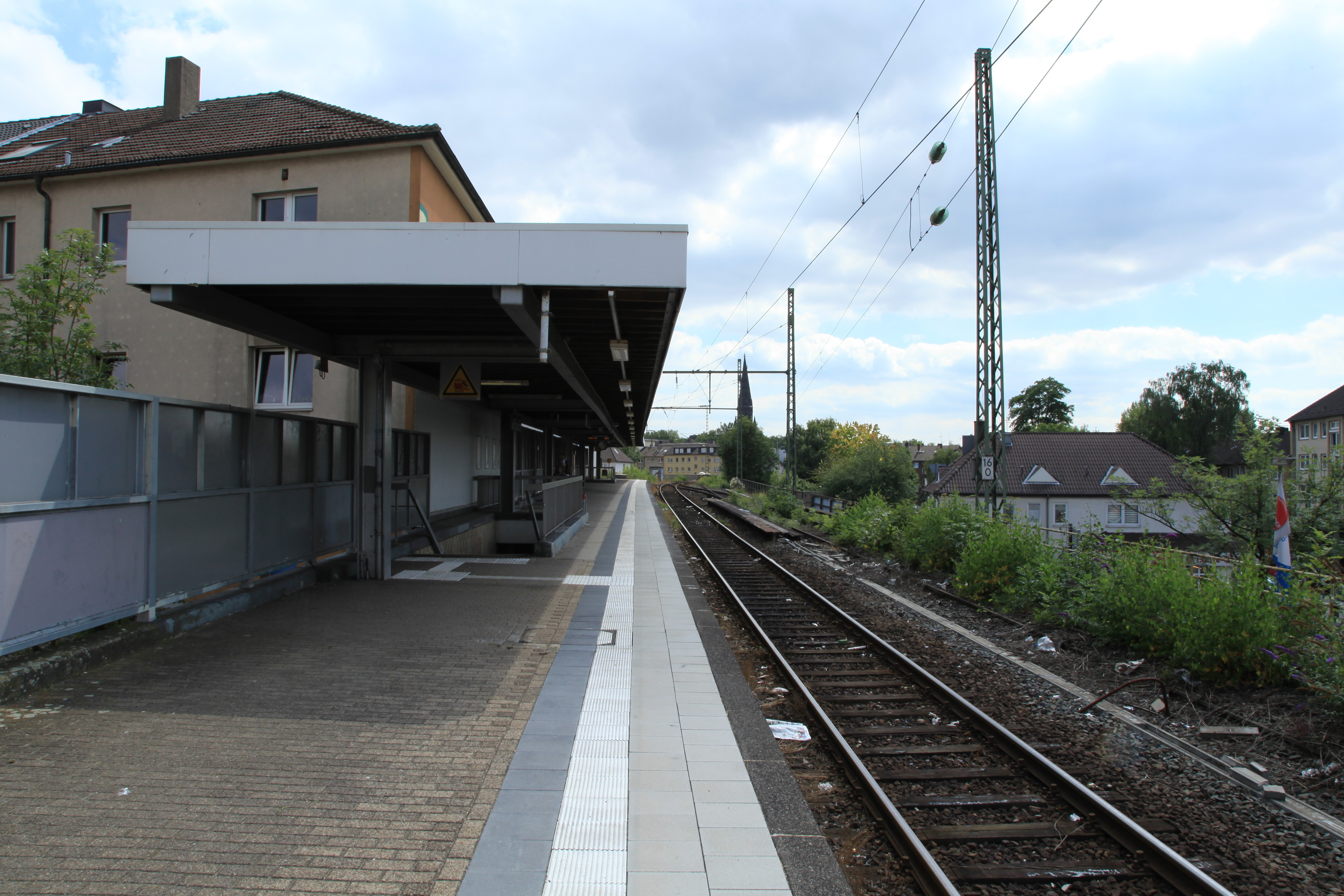
- 2012

General information
- Location: Bochum West station, Alleestr. 26, 44793 Bochum; North Rhine-Westphalia; Germany
- Coordinates: 51.481247°N 7.211543°E
- System: Hp
- Owner: Deutsche Bahn
- Operator: DB Netz; DB Station&Service
- Lines: Bochum–Gelsenkirchen railway (KBS 428)
- Platforms: 1
- Tracks: 1
- Train operators: DB Regio NRW

Construction
- Parking: no
- Cycle facilities: no
- Accessible: no

Other information
- Station code: 726
- DS100 code: EBOW
- IBNR: 8006711
- Category: 6
- Fare zone: VRR: 360
- Website: www.bahnhof.de

Services
Preceding station	DB Regio NRW	Following station
Bochum-Hamme towards Haltern am See	RE 41	Bochum Hbf Terminus
Preceding station	VIAS	Following station
Bochum-Hamme towards Gelsenkirchen Hbf	RB 46	Bochum Hbf Terminus
Location
- Location within North Rhine-Westphalia Location within Germany Location within Europe

Bochum-West station (German: Haltepunkt Bochum-West) is a railway station in the municipality of Bochum, North Rhine-Westphalia, Germany. The station has a single side platform, and is situated on the Glückauf-Bahn line between Bochum and Gelsenkirchen.

== Rail services ==
|- | RB 46 | Glückauf-Bahn | Gelsenkirchen Hauptbahnhof – Wanne-Eickel Hauptbahnhof – Bochum-West – Bochum Hauptbahnhof |}
