= Bochum Stadtbahn =

Light rail line in North Rhine-Westphalia, Germany

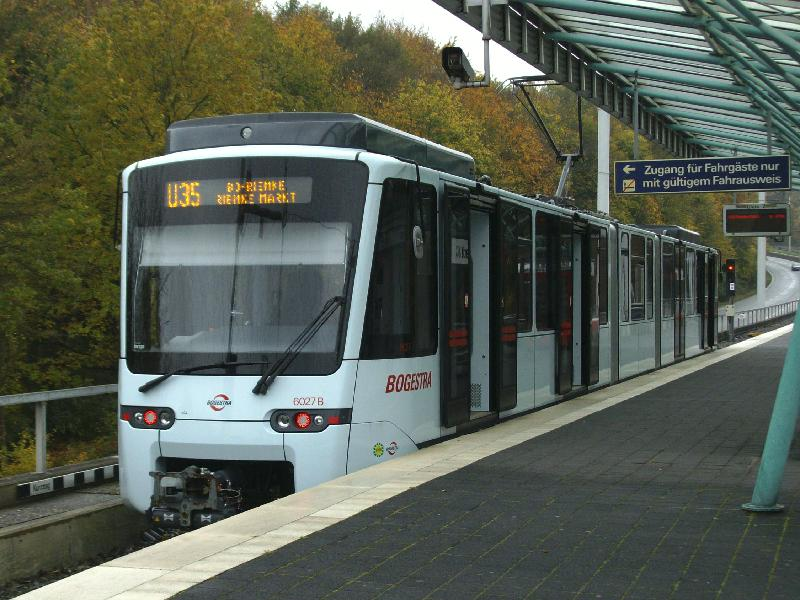
- A new Tango train on the U35 line

Overview
- Locale: Bochum/Herne, North Rhine-Westphalia, Germany
- Transit type: Light rail (Stadtbahn)
- Number of lines: 1
- Line number: U35
- Number of stations: 21 (15 underground)
- Website: BOGESTRA

Operation
- Began operation: 2 September 1989
- Operator: BOGESTRA

Technical
- System length: approx. 15 km (9 mi)
- Track gauge: 1,435 mm (4 ft 8 1/2 in) (standard gauge)
System map
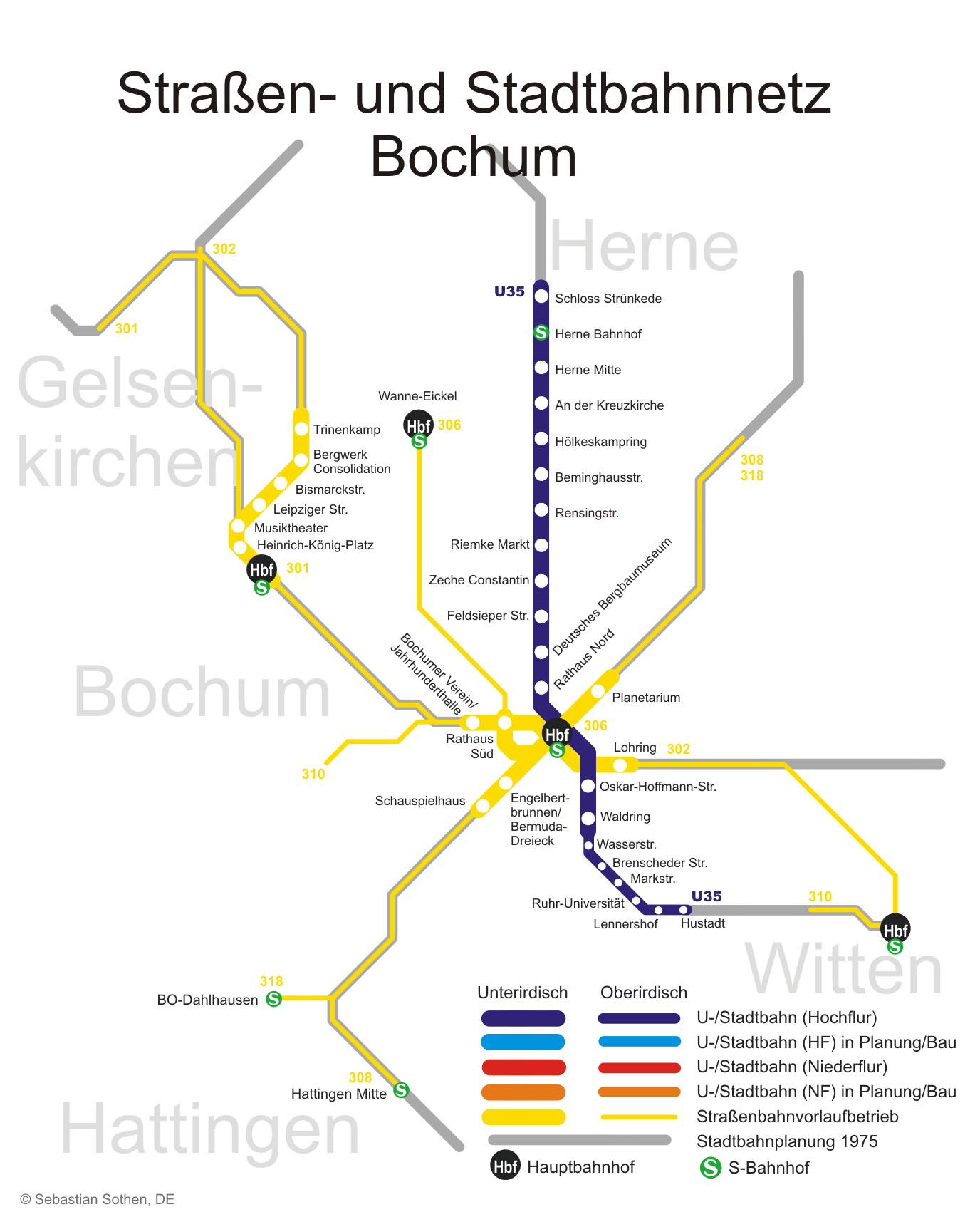

The Bochum Stadtbahn is a light rail line in North Rhine-Westphalia, Germany, linking the cities of Bochum and Herne. It is operated by BOGESTRA, and is integrated into the Rhine-Ruhr Stadtbahn network. It consists of a single Stadtbahn line, which includes a tunnel section between the city centers of Bochum and Herne.

== History ==
The Bochum Stadtbahn opened on 2 September 1989, then operating a route between Castle Herne Strünkede and Bochum Central Station. An extension of the line from the Bochum Central Station south to the Ruhr-University Bochum and to Hustadt opened for service on 28 November 1993. Planned sections of the Bochum Stadtbahn northwest to Recklinghausen and southeast to Witten were never implemented due to the associated costs to these respective municipalities.

== Route and operations ==
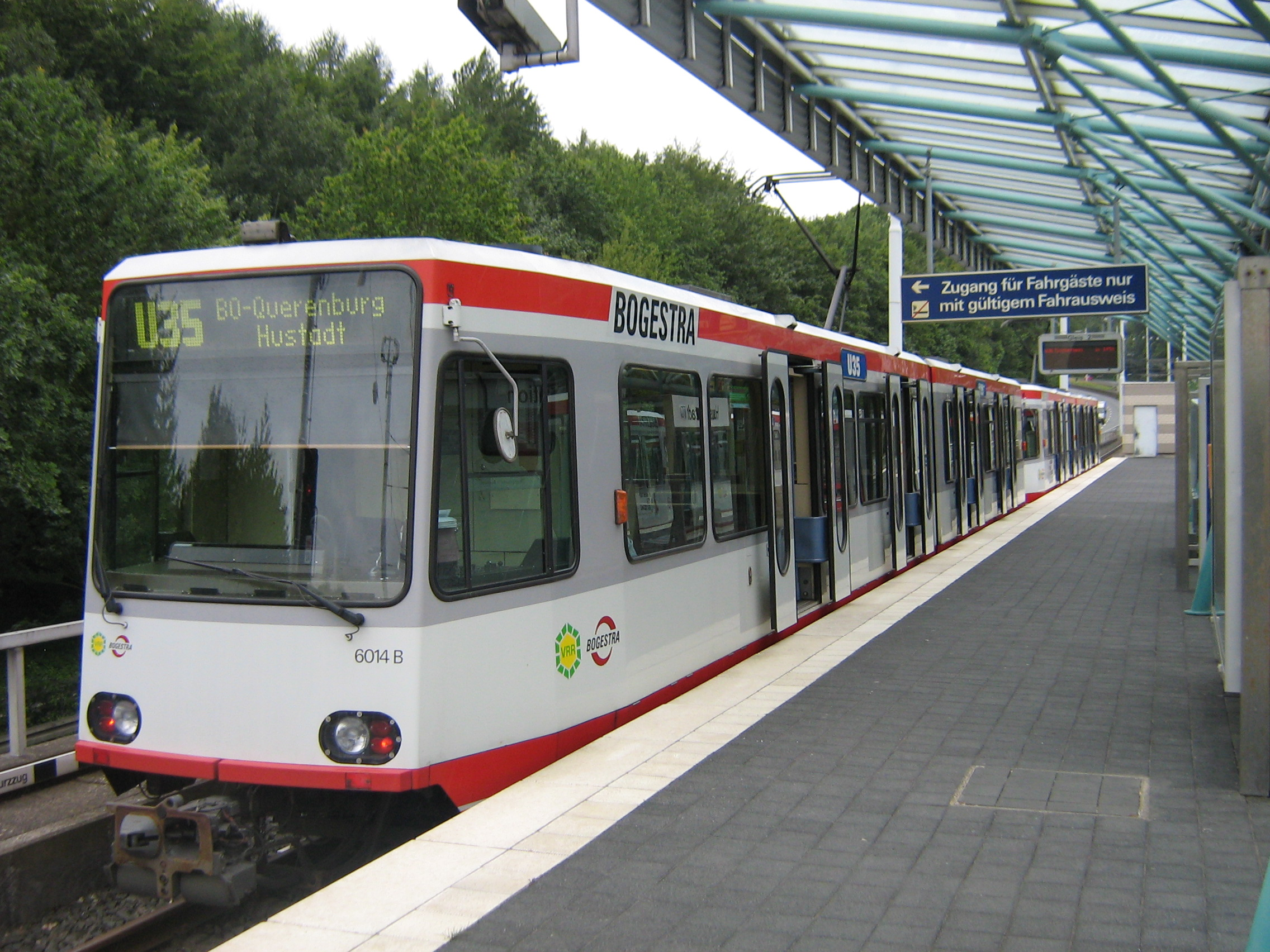
Stadtbahnwagen B at the southern terminus (Hustadt) on the U35

The Bochum Stadtbahn route is called the U35 line. It runs north–south for approximately 15 kilometers (9 mi) from Schloss Strünkede in Herne, via the city center of Bochum and the Ruhr University Bochum, to Querenburg in Bochum. More than two-thirds of this line runs underground. Only the southernmost six stations are at grade, in the portion of the U35 line that runs in the median of a highway. On this section, there are three at-grade road crossings, which renders it not a true metro system, but rather a light rail one. Despite that, however, it is one of the few Stadbahn systems not to share tracks and stations with regular trams, like the Frankfurt U-Bahn, making it closer to true metro systems like Munich U-Bahn than other similar light rail systems like Düsseldorf Stadtbahn. The U35 is by far the busiest public transport line in the BOGESTRA service area – it is the only rail line to run every 5 minutes on weekdays and the only one on which the trains consist of two coupled-car trainsets.

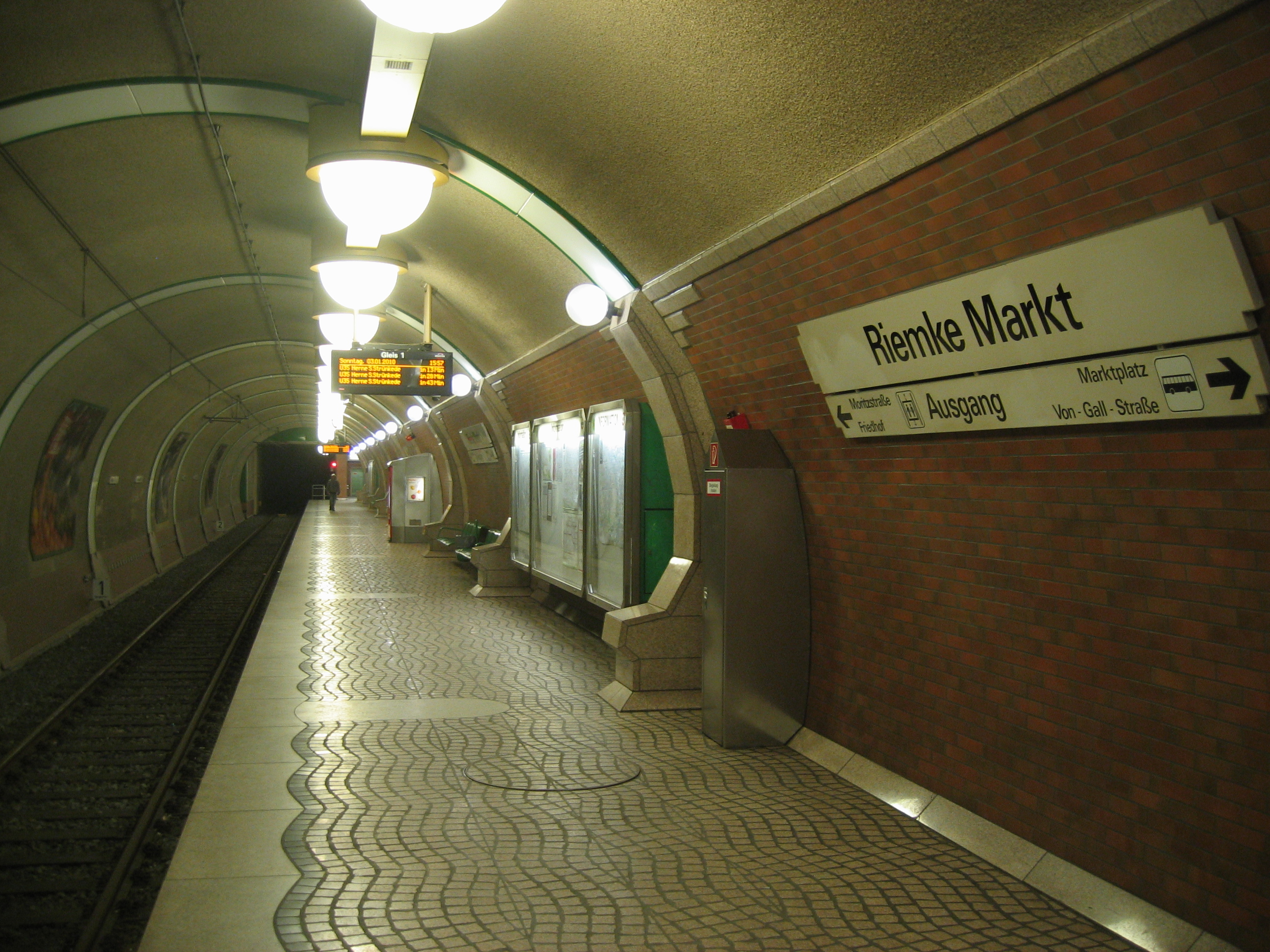
Riemke Markt, one of the many underground stations on the U35 line

The other Stadtbahn lines that were planned for the Bochum Stadtbahn system were never finished, but portions of those planned lines were built and are in use by transit. In Bochum, two more tunnels were built under the city center, one east–west tunnel and one northeast–southwest tunnel. Both of these have four underground stations. In Gelsenkirchen, a tunnel was built as well – it begins at the train station and from there heads north, via the city center.

== Rolling stock ==
The U35 line uses 25 standardized Stadtbahnwagen B trainsets from Duewag supplemented with 12 Stadler Tango trainsets (6 delivered in 2008, 6 more in 2021). With the additional Tango trains in stock, the old Stadtbahnwagen B trains will be modernized within the next few years. The first of the modernized trains arrived back in Bochum in March 2024 and is due to be re-integrated into public traffic for the autumn of the same year.

== See also ==
- Trams in Bochum/Gelsenkirchen
- Rhine-Ruhr Stadtbahn
- Verkehrsverbund Rhein-Ruhr
