= Trams in Bochum/Gelsenkirchen =

Tramway network in Germany

Coordinates: 51°28′28″N 07°13′30″E

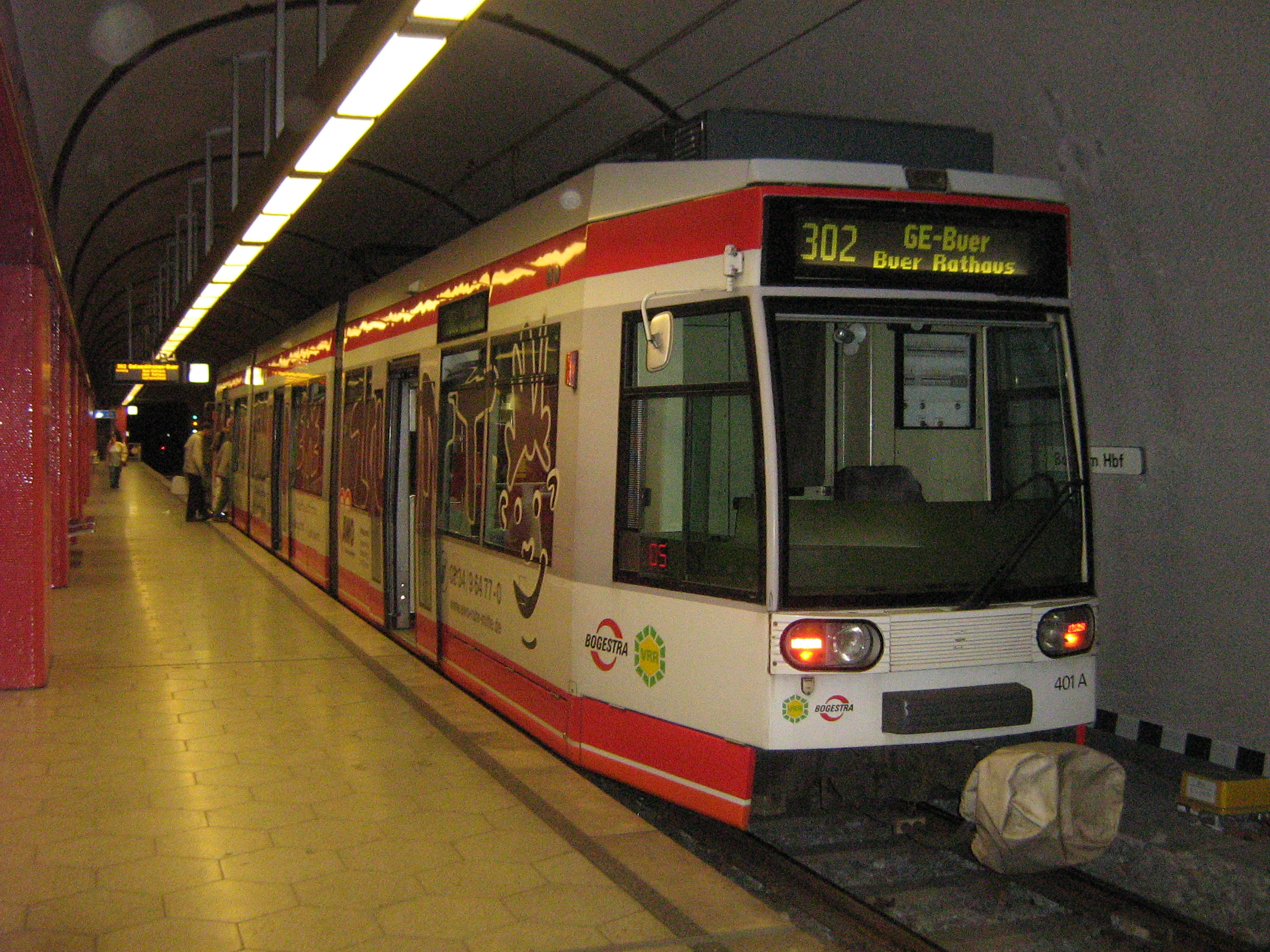
- A BOGESTRA tram at Bochum Hbf

Operation
- Locale: Bochum / Gelsenkirchen, North Rhine-Westphalia, Germany
- Open: 23 November 1894
- Status: Operational
- Lines: 9 (+ 1 Ruhrbahn line: 107)
- Operator: Bochum-Gelsenkirchener Straßenbahnen AG (BOGESTRA)

Infrastructure
- Track gauge: 1,000 mm (3 ft 3 3/8 in)
- Propulsion system: Electricity
- Electrification: 600 (750) V DC
- Depot: 2

Statistics
- Route length: 84 km (52 mi)
Overview
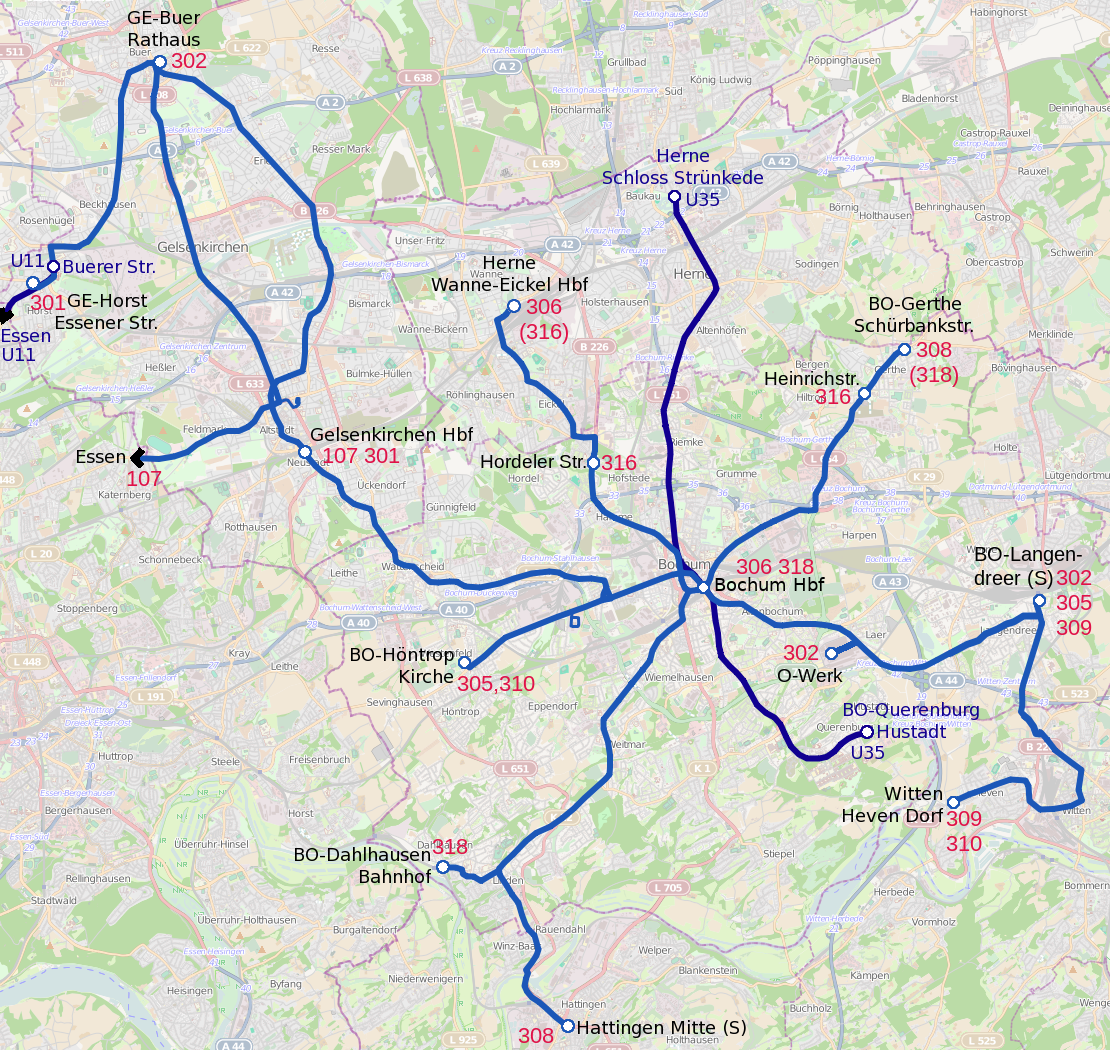
The network in 2023.
- Website: https://www.bogestra.de/ BOGESTRA (in German)

The Bochum/Gelsenkirchen tramway network (German: Straßenbahnnetz Bochum/Gelsenkirchen) is a network of tramways focused on Bochum and Gelsenkirchen, two cities in the federal state of North Rhine-Westphalia, Germany.

Opened in 1894 in Bochum and in 1895 in Gelsenkirchen, the network is operated by the Bochum-Gelsenkirchener Straßenbahnen AG (BOGESTRA), and integrated in the Verkehrsverbund Rhein-Ruhr (VRR). It also serves the neighbouring towns of Hattingen, Herne and Witten.

== Lines ==
As of December 2019, the following nine tram lines are operated exclusively by BOGESTRA:

Line	Route	Stations (underground)	Comments	Map
301	Gelsenkirchen Hbf – Bismarck – Buer – Horst	34 (7)		
302	Gelsenkirchen-Buer Rathaus – Gelsenkirchen Hbf – Bochum Hbf – Laer Mitte (– O-Werk) – Langendreer Bf	44 (7)	Normally every second train terminates via the new connection to O-Werk, the others continue to Langendreer	
305	Bochum-Höntrop Kirche – Bochum Hbf – Laer Mitte – Langendreer Bf	25 (4)		
306	Herne-Wanne-Eickel Hbf – Bochum Hbf	21 (1)	Also operates as a Night Express.	
308	Bochum-Gerthe Schürbankstraße – Bochum Hbf – Weitmar – Linden – Hattingen Mitte	38 (4)		
309	Langendreer Bf – Witten Papenholz – Witten Rathaus – Heven Dorf	14 (0)		
310	Bochum-Höntrop Kirche – Bochum Hbf – Langendreer Markt – Witten Papenholz – Witten Rathaus – Heven Dorf	39 (4)		
316	Wanne-Eickel Hbf – Bochum Hbf – Bochum-Gerthe Heinrichstraße	31 (2)		
318	Bochum-Gerthe Schürbankstraße – Bochum Hbf – Weitmar – Linden – Dahlhausen Bf.	32 (4)	Also operates as a Night Express.	

In addition, a tenth tram line serves the BOGESTRA region:

Line	Route	Stations	Comments
107	Gelsenkirchen Hbf – Feldmark – Trabrennbahn – Essen-Katernberg – Zeche Zollverein – Essen Hbf – Bredeney	34	Operated by Ruhrbahn for most of the week. Only 11 stations in BOGESTRA area.

This line, which is operated by the Ruhrbahn for most of the week, has its northernmost 11 stations in the BOGESTRA transit area. Early on Saturday mornings, it is operated by BOGESTRA, and runs between Gelsenkirchen Hbf and Trabrennbahn only.

== Rolling stock ==
The tram network currently operates a fleet of 95 Variobahn trams (by Stadler Rail), first introduced in 2007, with two further orders placed in 2010 and 2015.

The type NF6D, (built by Duewag/Siemens as MGT6D), introduced in 1992 , was the first to feature a 70% low-floor section. There were significant problems with this type from the start, including cracks in the structure and issues with the single-wheel bogies, that even led to a series of minor derailments. A number were scrapped from 2015, with the majority being sold to Łódź, where they are due to be refurbed. Their primary use was on routes 302, 308, 318, including being coupled to double sets during stadium services.

Type M high-floor articulated trams (also from DÜWAG) were first introduced in 1976, with the initial plan to temporarily use trams in the tunnels until the upgrades to a full, never-completed, Stadtbahn system were to have been made. They saw service on all tram routes, eventually most ran on route 310, which was the last to be in parts incompatible with the modern fleet. They have been retired by 2021 and were replaced by the Variobahns, with car #332 being kept in original condition and livery for historic excursions.

Further, there is a fleet of historic tram cars that is being kept by the enthusiast organisation VHAG with support of Bogestra, and a rail-grinder. Those are:

Historic and work fleet
Number	Type	Manufacturer	Regular service	Image	Notes
40	GT6	DUEWAG	1968-1995		
88	GT6	DUEWAG	1968-1988		ex. type GT6 #48, fitted with catering bar
96	KSW	Fuchs	1948-1976		BMB 1976-95, reconstructed from two cars
332	M6	DUEWAG	1977-2021		red-white Stadtbahn livery
620	GT	DUEWAG	1968-		custom-built for driver training
678	M6	DUEWAG	1981-2012		Railgrinder/work car, ex. type M #340

The Stadtbahn line uses a separate fleet of high-floor Stadtbahnwagen B and Tango trains. It is not connected to the low-floor network and therefore trams on one system cannot operate on the other.

== See also ==
- Bochum Stadtbahn
- Trams in Germany
- List of town tramway systems in Germany
- Rhine-Ruhr Stadtbahn
- Verkehrsverbund Rhein-Ruhr
