= Essen-Kray Süd station =

Railway station in Essen, Germany

Essen-Kray Süd
- 2014

General information
- Location: Am Bocklerbaum 2; 45307 Essen; North Rhine-Westphalia (Germany)
- Coordinates: 51.4580°N 7.0746°E
- System: Hp
- Owner: DB Netz
- Operator: DB Station&Service
- Lines: Witten/Dortmund–Oberhausen/Duisburg railway (KBS 440)
- Platforms: 2 side platforms
- Tracks: 2
- Train operators: DB Regio NRW

Other information
- Station code: 1708
- DS100 code: EEKS
- IBNR: 8001911
- Category: 6
- Fare zone: VRR: 356
- Website: www.bahnhof.de

History
- Opened: 1896; 130 years ago

Services
Preceding station	DB Regio NRW	Following station
Essen Hbf Terminus	RB 40	Wattenscheid towards Hagen Hbf
Location
- Location within North Rhine-Westphalia

Essen-Kray Süd station is one of two railway stations in the German city of Essen, North Rhine-Westphalia, located in the district of Essen-Kray. The other one is Essen-Kray Nord station on the Essen–Gelsenkirchen railway line.

== History ==
The station was opened in 1896 with the name Kray Süd as the second Kray station after the aforementioned Essen-Kray Nord from 1873. It contributed to the development of Kray and the neighbouring Leithe during the period of industrialisation in the Ruhrgebiet. In 1929 Kray was incorporated into the city of Essen. In 1950 the station received its present name Essen-Kray Süd. In 1974 the station was classified as a Haltepunkt.
