= Wattenscheid station =

Railway station in Bochum, Germany

Wattenscheid
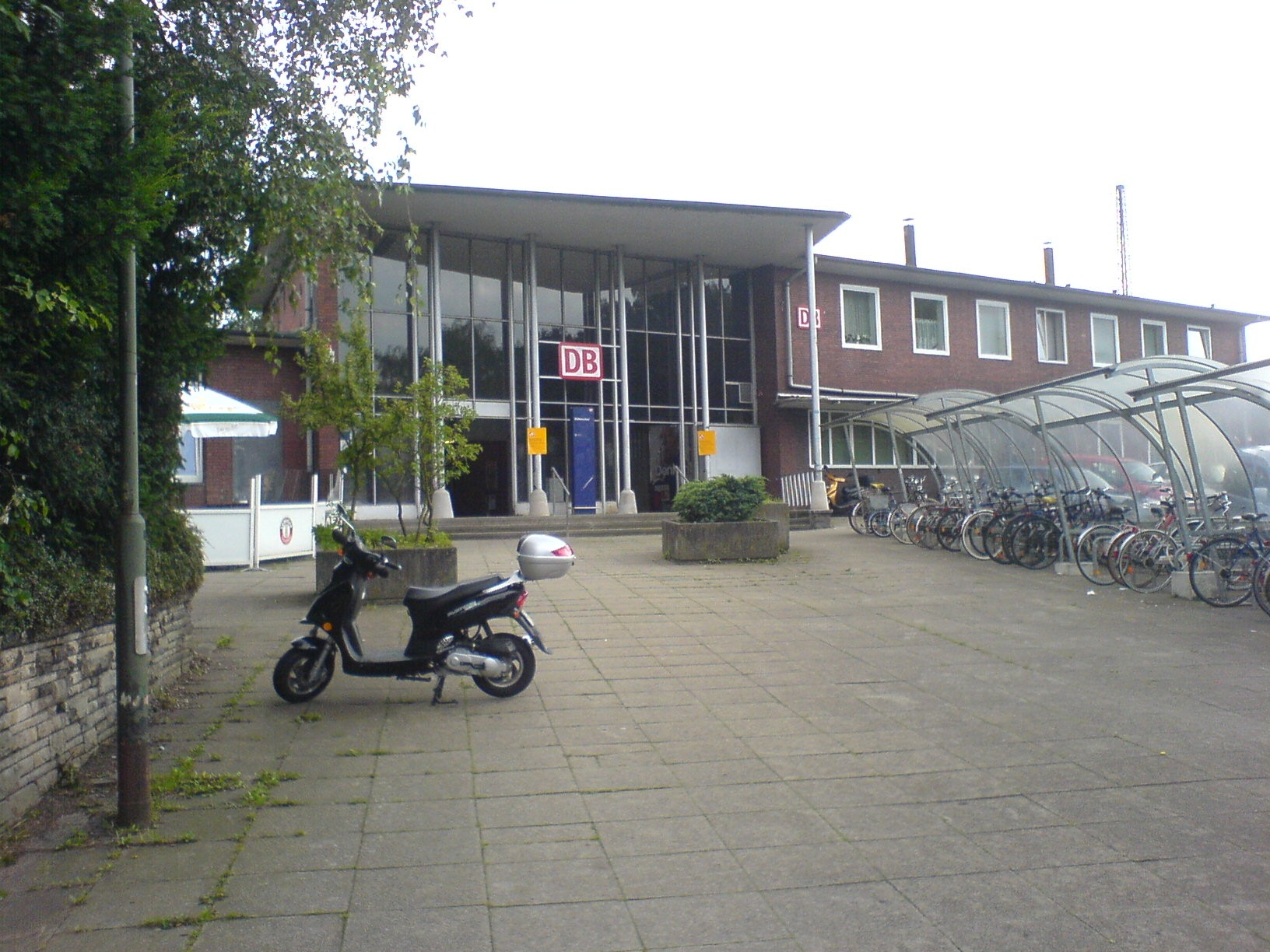
- Wattenscheid station in 2007

General information
- Location: Fritz-Reuter-Str. 23, Bochum, NRW; Germany
- Coordinates: 51°28′25″N 7°8′24″E
- Line: Witten/Dortmund–Duisburg
- Platforms: 2

Construction
- Accessible: Yes

Other information
- Station code: 6568
- DS100 code: EWAT
- IBNR: 8006226
- Category: 4
- Fare zone: VRR: 368
- Website: www.bahnhof.de

History
- Opened: 1875

Passengers
- 4,000

Services
Preceding station	National Express Germany	Following station
Essen Hbf towards Aachen Hbf	RE 1 (NRW-Express)	Bochum Hbf towards Hamm (Westf) Hbf
Essen Hbf towards Cologne/Bonn Airport	RE 6 (Rhein-Weser-Express)	Bochum Hbf towards Minden
Essen Hbf towards Düsseldorf Hbf	RE 11 (Rhein-Hellweg-Express)	Bochum Hbf towards Kassel-Wilhelmshöhe
Preceding station	VIAS	Following station
Essen Hbf Terminus	RE 16	Bochum Hbf towards Iserlohn
Preceding station	DB Regio NRW	Following station
Essen-Kray Süd towards Essen Hbf	RB 40	Bochum Hbf towards Hagen Hbf
Location
- Location within North Rhine-Westphalia

Wattenscheid station is on the Witten/Dortmund–Oberhausen/Duisburg railway. It is one of two stations in the formerly independent city of Wattenscheid, now a district of the city of Bochum in the German state of North Rhine-Westphalia. The other station is Wattenscheid-Höntrop. In late 2007, Wattenscheid station was downgraded to a Haltepunkt (literally “halt”, meaning that it is not a rail junction and has no sets of points). It is located just south of central Wattenscheid, next to the A 40 autobahn on the western edge of an industrial area.

== History ==
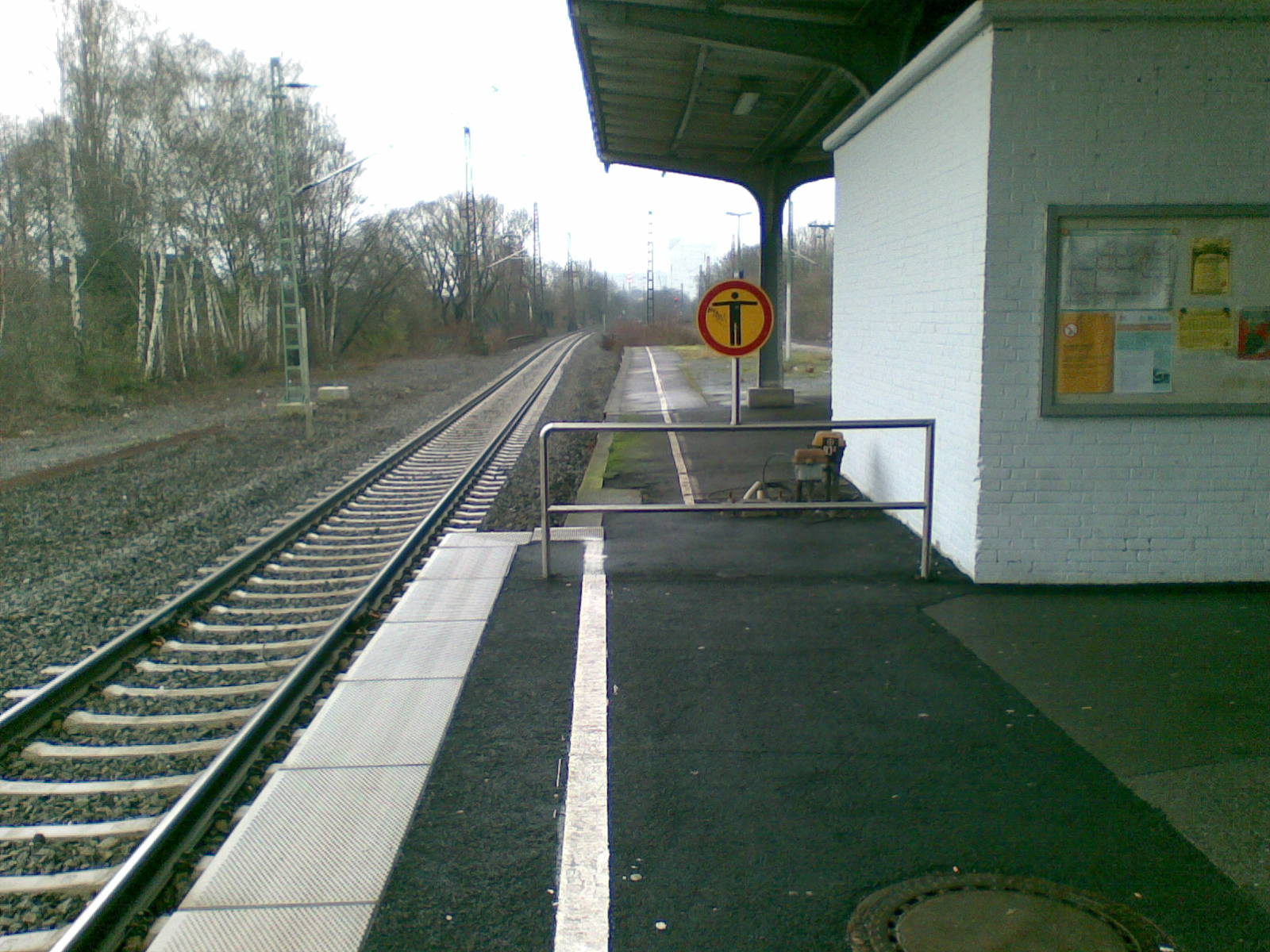
The platform has been shortened and widened to meet the former passing loop.

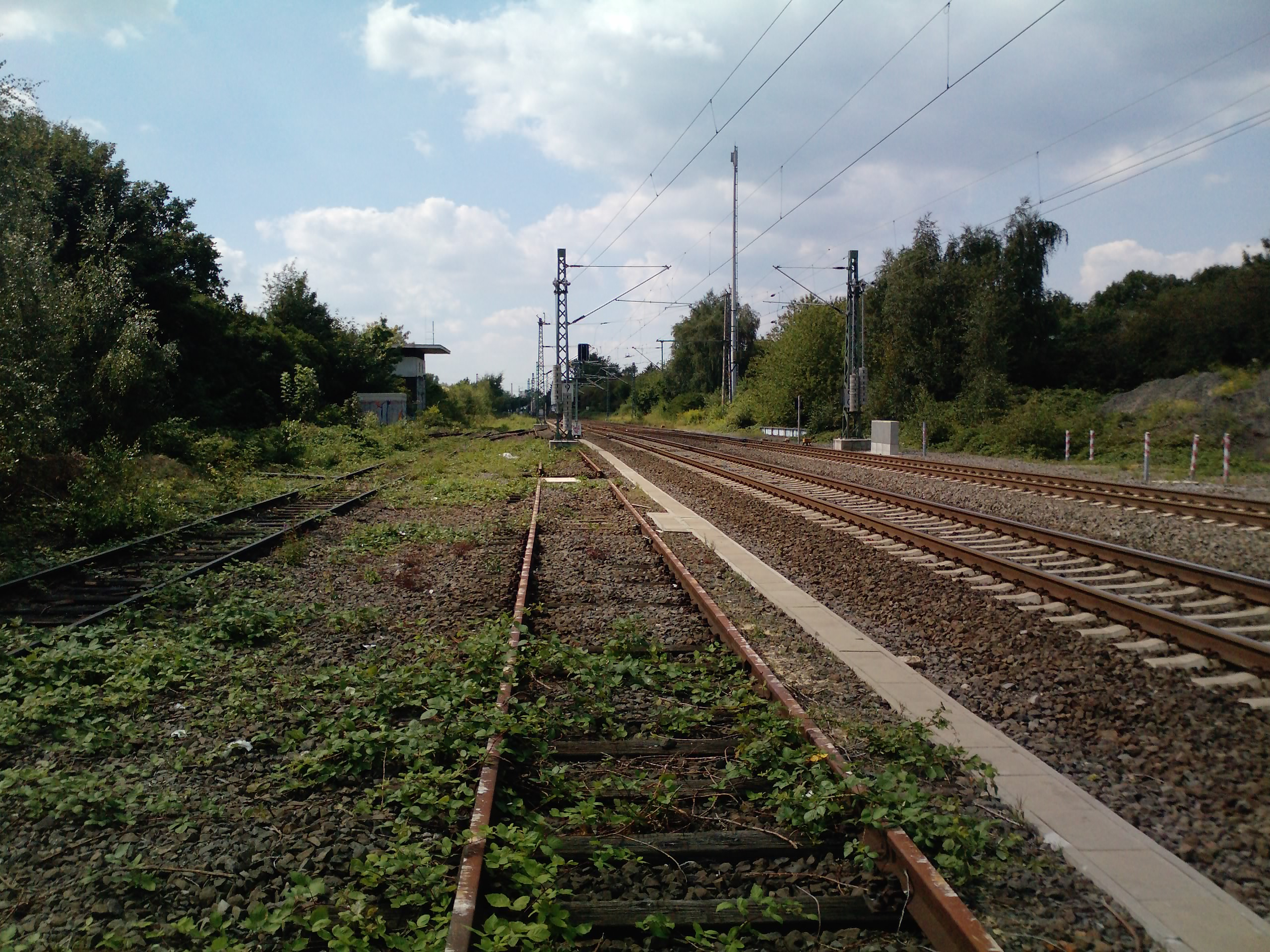
The old tracks and sidings have been largely abandoned. Behind to the left is the empty signal box.

A station named Wattenscheid has been at this location since 1874. It was on a line of the Bergisch-Märkische Railway Company (Bergisch-Märkische Eisenbahn-Gesellschaft, BME), which was nationalised in 1882. The current station building dates from 1956. The station at that time had more than ten tracks and was one of two rail terminals of the Fröhliche Morgensonne mine. A few hundred metres to the west lies the "Wf" interlocking, which was built in 1957. The freight tracks were dismantled with the closure of the mine.

A passing loop without a platform running towards Dortmund was removed in early 2006 and a passing loop running towards Essen were removed at the end of 2007, leaving Wattenscheid station with only two tracks around a central platform. With the new 2007/2008 timetable the tracks were renumbered, with the remaining tracks 3 and 4 now renumbered as tracks 1 and 2. Since the two bridges east of the station were built for the outer tracks the platform length was reduced from 310 metres to 250 metres and it was widened so that the tracks could use the outer alignments.

In 2008, Deutsche Bahn renewed the track, formation, signals and overhead lines in Wattenscheid, repaired the broken station clock and replaced the two existing ticket machines with a new one. Since 2008, the signal box has been closed, with signalling now worked remotely. Over the years, a fast food restaurant and a kiosk have opened in the station's empty rooms.

Since 2009, further work has been underway to upgrade the line in the area of the station, with the complete dismantling of the old sidings and connections to factories, as well as work on the overhead lines.

Rehabilitation of the station and upgrading it for access for the disabled is planned from 2014.

Deutsche Bahn confirmed on 17 June 2009 that the government of North Rhine-Westphalia was considering including Wattenscheid station in the Rhine-Ruhr Express program, which is scheduled to provide high-speed regional express services from 2023.

== Operations ==
Wattenscheid is served by four Regional-Express services and a Regionalbahn service. Apart from Bochum Hauptbahnhof, it is the only station in the city of Bochum served by Regional-Express services.

The S1 services of the Rhine-Ruhr S-Bahn run between Bochum and Essen on the southern S-Bahn line through Wattenscheid-Höntrop station instead of serving Wattenscheid.

Line	Name	Route	Operator
RE 1	NRW-Express	Hamm (Westf) – Dortmund – Bochum – Wattenscheid – Essen – Duisburg – Düsseldorf – Cologne – Aachen	National Express
RE 6	Rhein-Weser-Express	Minden (Westf) – Bielefeld – Hamm (Westf) – Dortmund – Bochum – Wattenscheid – Essen – Duisburg – Düsseldorf – Neuss – Cologne – Cologne/Bonn Airport	National Express
RE 11	Rhein-Hellweg-Express	(Kassel-Wilhelmshöhe – Paderborn –) Hamm (Westf) – Dortmund – Bochum – Wattenscheid – Essen – Duisburg – Düsseldorf	National Express
RE 16	Ruhr-Lenne-Express	Essen – Wattenscheid – Bochum – Witten – Hagen – Letmathe – Iserlohn	VIAS
RB 40	Ruhr-Lenne-Bahn	Essen – Wattenscheid – Bochum – Witten – Hagen	DB Regio NRW

== Station complex ==
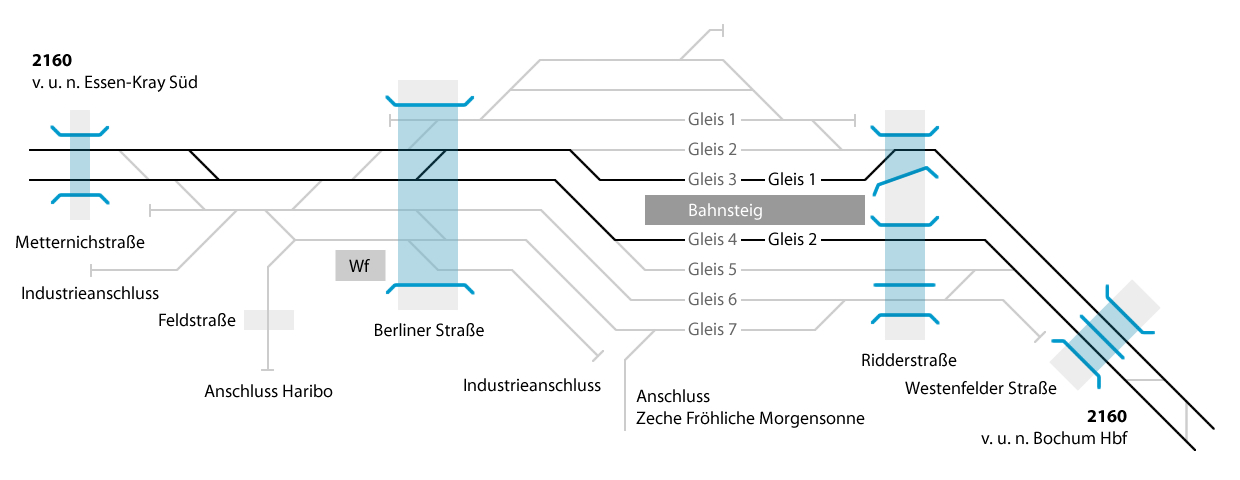
Track plan

All trains to Essen operate on the northern track 1; trains to Bochum operate on platform 2. The central platform is 76 cm high and on it is a ticket machine and several display cases with current travel information. It is partially sheltered and is not accessible for the disabled.

As of autumn 2010, the station has a departure board in the foyer, as well as destination displays on the platform. Passenger information is also supplied by automated announcements. In the station building, there is a vacant restaurant, a fast food restaurant, and a kiosk.

== Connections ==
Wattenscheid station is located about 100 metres from a stop on Bahnhofstrasse served by bus lines 365, 386 and 389 and, on weekends night, by line NE6. Tram lines 302 and 310 operate through the tram stops of August-Bebel-Platz and Höntrop Kirche, which can be reached by the mentioned bus-services. The station is of considerable importance for the surrounding area and for more distant suburbs as a park-and-ride station.
