= Bochum–Gelsenkirchen railway =

Railway line in Germany

Coordinates: 51°30′18″N 7°12′05″E

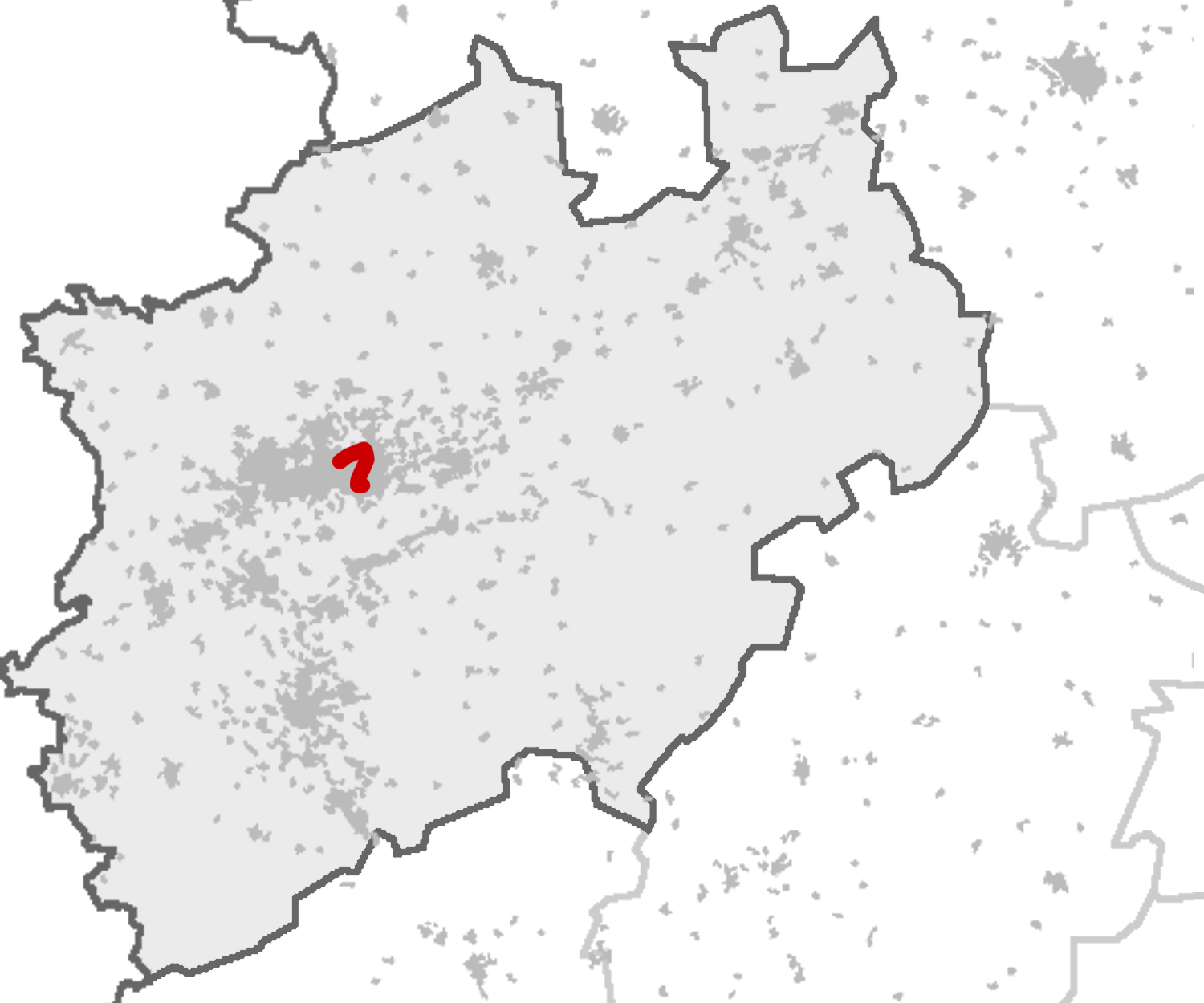

Overview
- Line number: 2153
- Locale: North Rhine-Westphalia, Germany

Service
- Route number: 428

Technical
- Line length: 17.8 km (11.1 mi)
- Track gauge: 1,435 mm (4 ft 8 1/2 in) standard gauge

The Bochum–Gelsenkirchen railway, also known as the Glückauf-Bahn (referring to Glück auf, the traditional German miners greeting), is a passenger railway from Bochum Central Station (Hauptbahnhof) to Gelsenkirchen Central Station in the German state of North Rhine-Westphalia. It is served by Regionalbahn passenger service RB 46). It is also used by freight traffic from Bochum freight yard at the former Bochum Süd station and Bochum-Präsident to Gelsenkirchen-Schalke Nord. The line was built in sections between 1867 and 1876 of the Bergisch-Märkische Railway Company. The curve connecting to Bochum Central Station was opened in 1979.

== Passengers ==
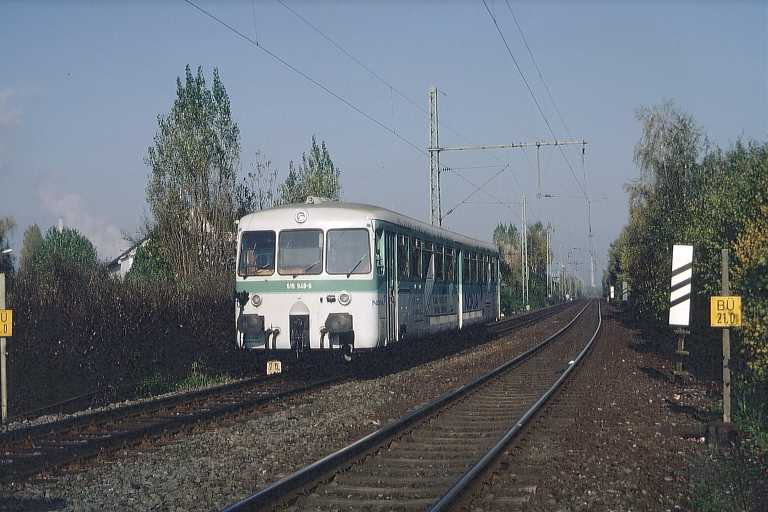
Class 515 battery car in the early 90s near Bochum-Nokia

Until 1978, the Deutsche Bundesbahn passenger service ran from Bochum-Langendreer via Bochum-Nord, Bochum-Riemke to Wanne-Eickel (see Bochum-Riemke–Wanne-Eickel line below). After the construction of a connecting curve from Bochum Central Station (Hauptbahnhof) to the line towards Riemke in 1979, passenger services ran until 1990 from Bochum over the curve from Herne-Rottbruch to Herne, but subsequently services ran via Wanne-Eickel to Gelsenkirchen Central Station. Herne Rottbruch station represented a special case for operations, because it is located on a bridge over autobahn 43, but it has not been served since 1990. In the early 90s, the electronics manufacturer Nokia, which then had a factory near the railway, sponsored the modernisation of the fleet (starting with three vehicles of class 515 battery electric multiple units and followed by class 628 diesel multiple units). As a result, the line was renamed the Nokia-Bahn ("Nokia Railway") and Bochum-Graetz station was renamed Bochum-Nokia. Following Nokia's closure of its Bochum factory in late 2008, the line was renamed the Glückauf-Bahn. At the timetable change of 2009/10, the station was renamed Bochum-Riemke.

Since the timetable change in December 2023, Vias has operated the Ruhr-Sieg network consisting of the RB 46 (Bochum – Gelsenkirchen), the RE 16 (Essen – Iserlohn) and the RB 91 (Hagen – Siegen/Iserlohn). The Stadler Flirt electric multiple units on the line were acquired from the previous operator DB Regio.

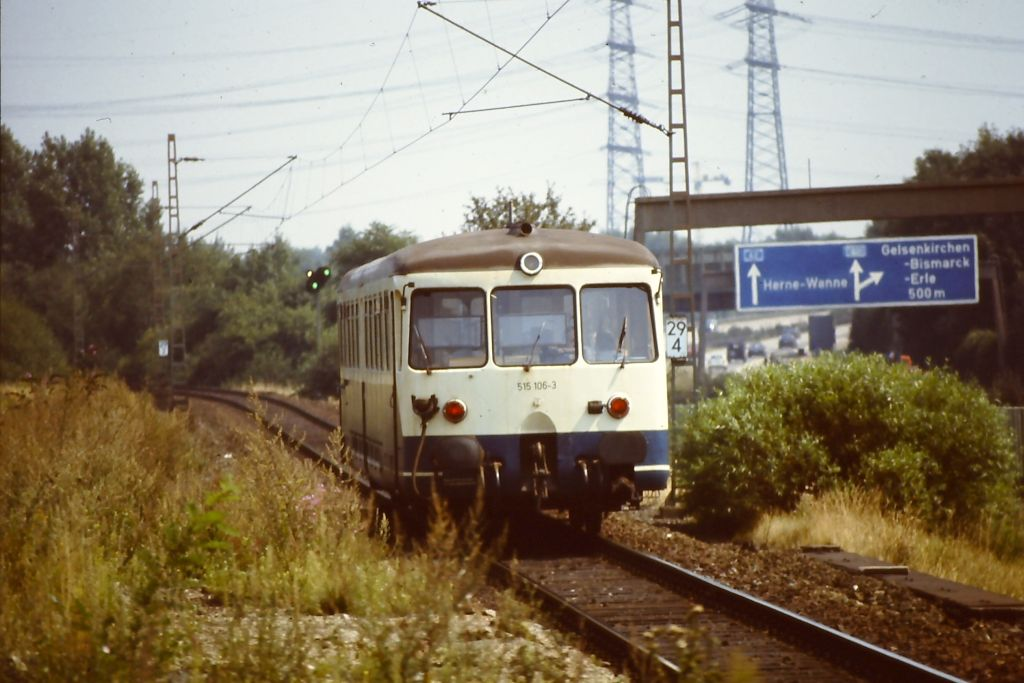
Class 515 battery car in the early 90s near Gelsenkirchen-Zoo

The Wanne-Eickel–Gelsenkirchen-Zoo–Dorsten section is used in passenger operations by Regionalbahn service RB 43. Until 1988, trains were operated by class 515 battery cars from the northernmost track of Wanne-Eickel station via a connecting curve directly to Wanne-Unser Fritz ("Our Fred", serving the Unser Fritz colliery, which was named after Frederick III) station. Today, the connecting curve is dismantled and the station is closed. Since the closure of the curve, passenger trains depart from the southern platform in Wanne-Eickel over the longer, southern connecting curve without stopping at Gelsenkirchen Zoo.

The 1968/69 timetable included a Wanne-Eickel–Gelsenkirchen-Zoo–Gelsenkirchen-Schalke–Bottrop-Süd–Oberhausen service. In 1940, there was a Wanne-Eickel–Gelsenkirchen-Bismarck–Schalke Nord–Gelsenkirchen-Hessler–Essen service.

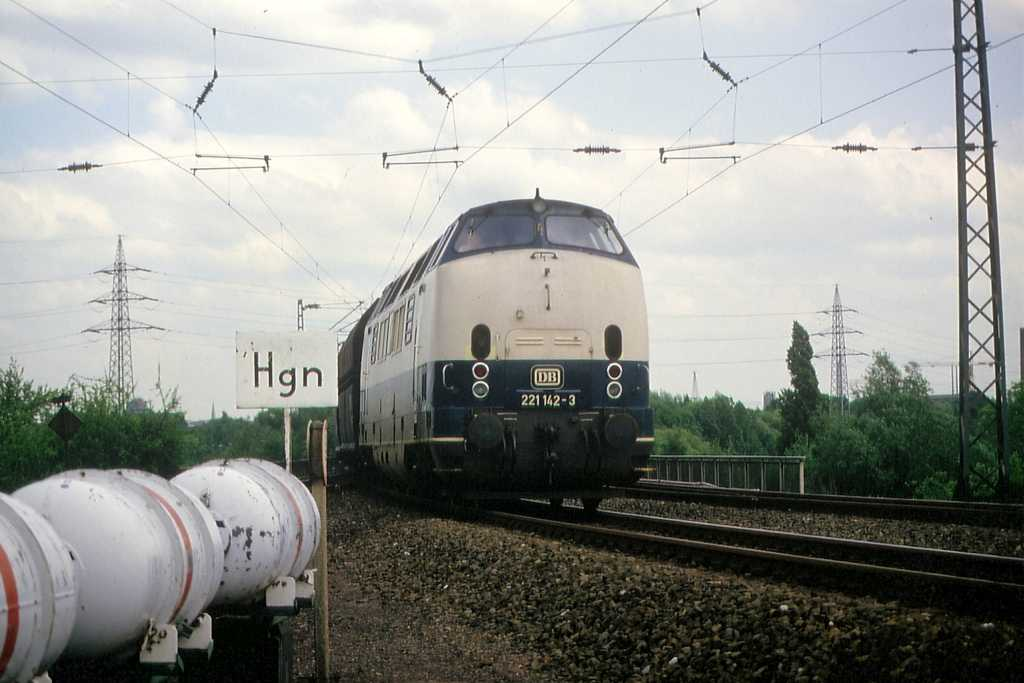
DB Diesel locomotive of class 221 in the mid-1980s at Herne Rottbruch Hgn junction

== Freight ==
Freight from Bochum-Langendreer runs over line 2153. This bypasses the stations of Wanne-Eickel and Herne, reaching Recklinghausen and Gelsenkirchen-Bismarck directly.

== Associated lines ==
Bochum-Riemke–Wanne-Eickel/ Gelsenkirchen–Wanne-Eickel

Overview
- Line number: 2154 (Bochum-Riemke–Wanne-Eickel); 2232 (Gelsenkirchen–Wanne-Eickel)
- Locale: North Rhine-Westphalia

Technical
- Track gauge: 1,435 mm (4 ft 8 1/2 in) standard gauge

=== Bochum-Riemke–Wanne-Eickel railway ===
The line from Bochum-Riemke to Wanne-Eickel via Wanne-Röhlinghausen was used by passenger and freight traffic from 1886 to 1960. The chainage starts at the former Bochum Präsident station. Apart from passenger services between Bochum-Langendreer and Wanne-Eickel, it was used by freight traffic to the Hannover colliery (until 1973) and the Mannesmann steelworks in Wanne-Eickel (until its closure in 1980). The line went past the Hannover colliery to the east and the preserved Malakow tower of the mine is still recognisable. West of the mine and the neighbouring Königsgrube (“king's pit”) colliery was in places less than 100 metres away from the Gelsenkirchen-Wattenscheid–Wanne-Eickel railway (line 2232, see below). The Bochum-Riemke–Wanne-Eickel railway passed under the southern pair of tracks of the Gelsenkirchen–Wanne-Eickel main line at today's Görresstraße in Wanne-Eickel (exactly at the point where the parallel Gelsenkirchen-Wattenscheid–Wanne-Eickel line (line 2232) connected at a high level with the southern pair of tracks), then ran through Bickern junction and connected at Plutostraße with the northern tracks from Gelsenkirchen to Wanne-Eickel. This allowed Wanne-Eickel station to be reached by this line from the west, unlike the still operational Bochum–Gelsenkirchen line, which reaches Wanne-Eickel from the east.

=== Gelsenkirchen–Gelsenkirchen-Wattenscheid–Wanne-Eickel railway ===
This 10-km long line ran from Gelsenkirchen Central Station via Gelsenkirchen-Wattenscheid station, which is on the southern outskirts of the city, and back north to Wanne-Eickel. It was operated exclusively for freight, except for a brief period in the 1880s. However, the route was temporarily used in 1949 for the Katholikentag (“Catholic's day”) pilgrimages to Bochum, because the Bochum-Riemke–Wanne-Eickel line (discussed above) was overloaded. Originally built as a colliery railway (Carolinenglück Railway, see below), the section from Gelsenkirchen Hbf to Gelsenkirchen-Wattenscheid was dismantled in the 1960s, while the eastern branch to the Hanover and Königsgrube collieries was electrified in 1977 before its closure in 1990.

=== Carolinenglück Railway ===
A colliery railway connected from Gelsenkirchen-Wattenscheid station to the east to the Carolinenglück colliery nearby. Along with the neighbouring collieries of Hannover, Holland and Rheinelbe, the Carolinenglück colliery had a rail connection to Gelsenkirchen CME (now Gelsenkirchen Central Station) in the 1850s. It was connected in 1867 to the Rhenish Railway Company's new Osterath–Dortmund Süd railway. Parts of the line at the Carolinenglück mine were used for the route of an iron ore railway built from the Rhine-Herne Canal to the Bochumer Verein steel works in the early 20th century.
