= Grumme =

Coordinates: 51°29′59″N 7°13′42″E

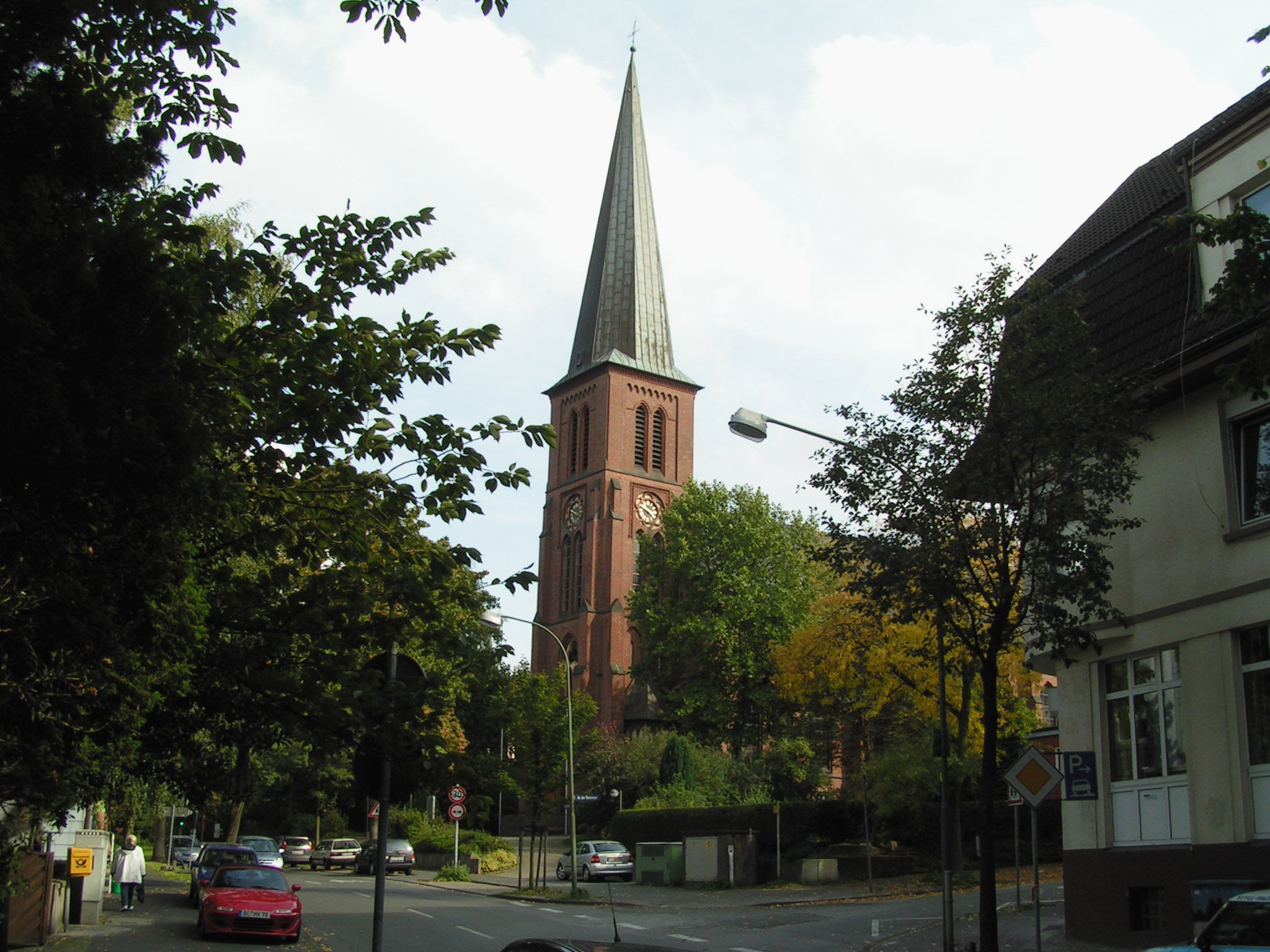
View of the St. Liborius Church in Grumme, Bochum (September 2007)

Grumme is a quarter of the Westphalian city of Bochum in Germany. It is north of the city centre. Grumme has a tram line running from Gerthe to Hattingen. Grumme is world-famous because of the Starlight Express, the most-viewed musical in the world. It is famous for its parks and avenues, the German Mining Museum, many hospitals and old buildings. It is one of the wealthiest parts of the Ruhr area. Grumme houses the largest stadium in Bochum, the Ruhrstadion. The most famous inhabitants from Grumme are the chief of orthopedics in NRW, the major of Bochum and the producent of "Bochum Total", a famous German music festival.
