= Gerthe =

Quarter of Bochum, Germany

Coordinates: 51°30′59″N 7°16′20″E

Gerthe is a part of the city of Bochum in the Ruhr area in Germany. Up to the 19th century Westphalian was spoken here. Gerthe is a district in the working-class north of Bochum, in the northeast, bordering Herne and Castrop-Rauxel. The tramline to Hattingen starts here.
