= BOGESTRA =

German public transport operator

Coordinates: 51°28′27″N 7°13′30″E

Bochum-Gelsenkirchener Straßenbahnen AG
- Founded: 13 January 1896
- Headquarters: Universitätsstraße 58; 44789 Bochum
- Locale: Bochum, North Rhine-Westphalia, Germany
- Service area: Bochum, Gelsenkirchen, Herne and Witten
- Alliance: Verkehrsverbund Rhein-Ruhr (VRR)
- Routes: Multi-Modal regional transit network consisting of: 2 Stadtbahn lines (2025); 10 Tram lines (2025); 71 Bus lines (2025)
- Stops: 3,018 (total as of 2025)
- Fleet: 397 vehicles total: 32 underground vehicles; 95 tram vehicles; 234 buses; 36 electric buses
- Annual ridership: 133 million (2025)
- Website: BOGESTRA AG

The Bochum-Gelsenkirchener Straßenbahnen AG (English: Bochum-Gelsenkirchen Tramways Corporation), abbreviated BOGESTRA, is a public transport operator in the Ruhr area, most notably in the cities of Bochum, Gelsenkirchen and Herne. As of 2025, the company operated, in whole or in part, 12 rail lines (2 Stadtbahn, and 10 tram), and 71 bus lines. In 2025, BOGESTRA transported a total of 133 million passengers. The company is a member of the Verkehrsverbund Rhein-Ruhr (VRR) public transport association.

== History ==
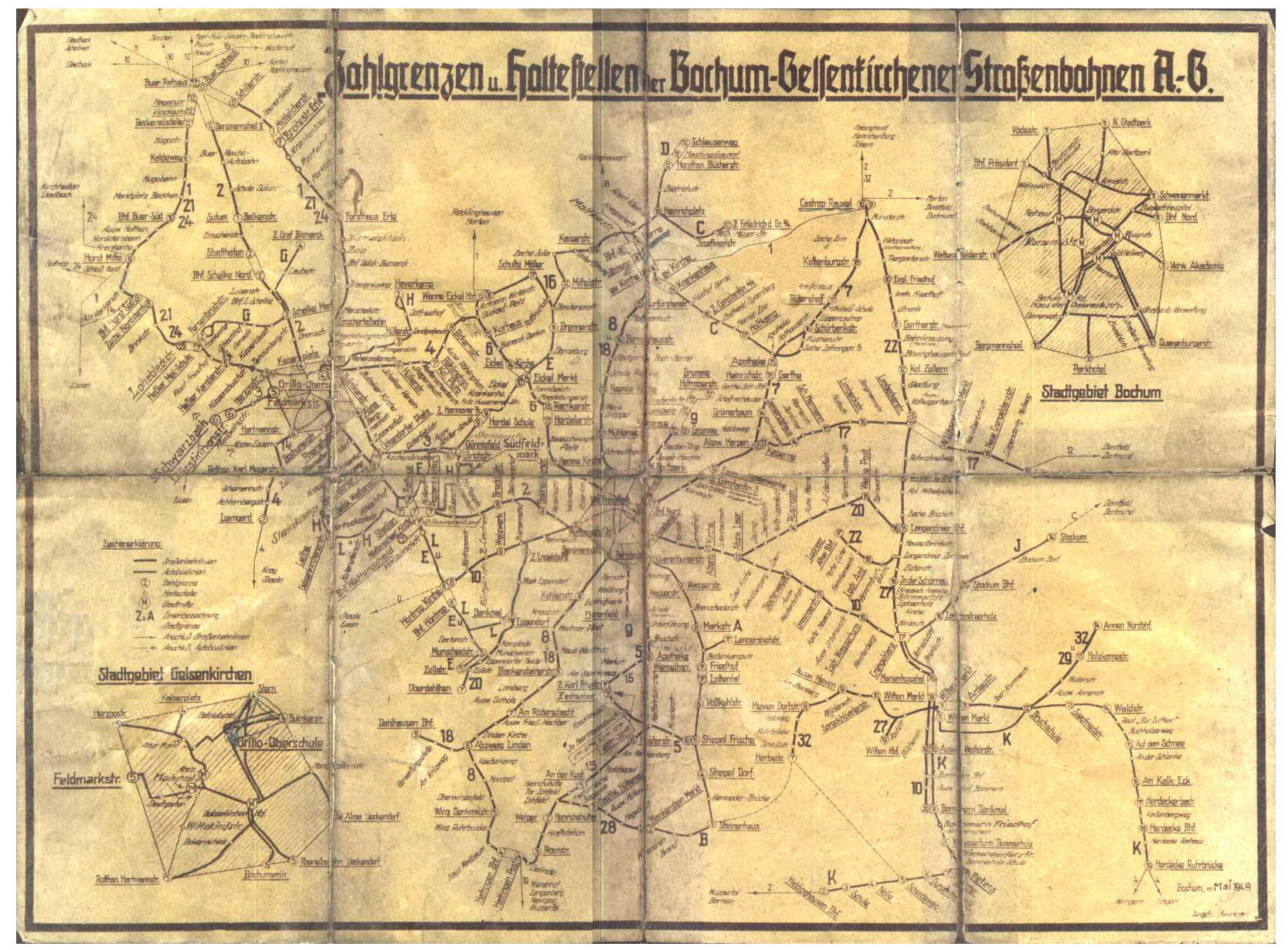
BOGESTRA network, 1949

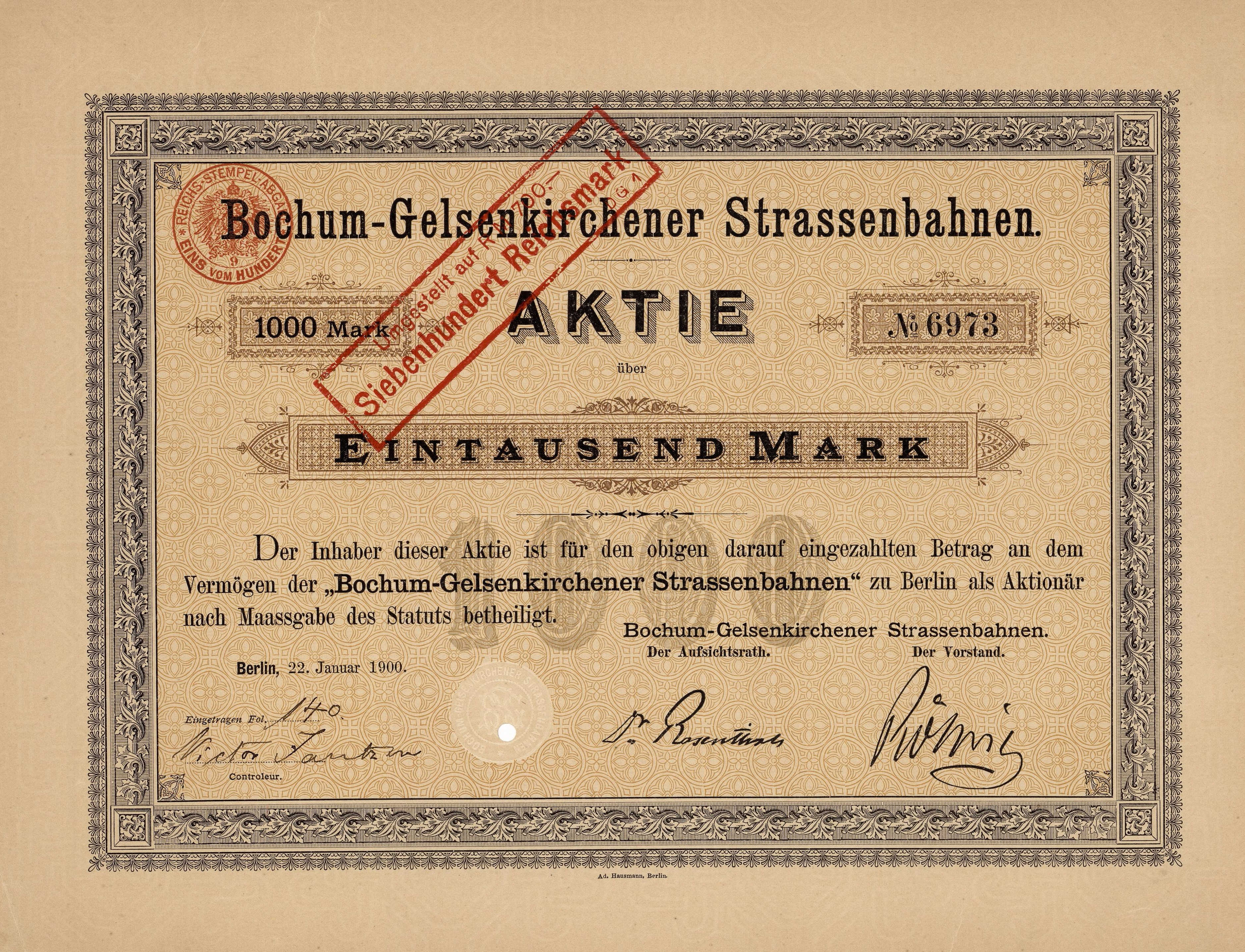
Share of the Bochum-Gelsenkirchener Strassenbahnen, issued 22 January 1900

BOGESTRA was founded by the cities of Bochum and Gelsenkirchen and Siemens & Halske AG in Berlin on 13 January 1896. At the time of the founding of the company, the transit network consisted of three lines built by Siemens & Halske in 1894 and 1895. Thus, BOGESTRA already had, at the time of its founding, approximately 15.1 kilometres (9.4 mi) of streetcar network. The construction and operation of these lines remained with the Siemens & Halske AG, while BOGESTRA itself initially took only functional control. In the next 10 years the network grew rapidly.

Much of the streetcar network was damaged or destroyed by Allied bombing during World War II. On 24 May 1945, the deployment of transit personnel and the operation of approximately 55 kilometres (34 mi) of the rail network were resumed. In the period following the war, additional routes and lines were repaired and reopened. By the end of 1950, a total of 27 lines were back in operation, and the reconstruction of the rail system could be considered complete.

Starting from the 1960s, plans in the Rhine-Ruhr region saw for the metre-gauge trams to be replaced by a core network of Stadtbahn light-rail routes, using Stadtbahnwagen B cars on standard gauge, running grade-separated including significant tunneled sections. For Bogestra the following lines were planned:

- Recklinghausen – Herne – Bochum – Ruhr-University – Witten (U35)
- Castrop-Rauxel – Bochum-Gerthe – Bochum – Hattingen (U38)
- Gelsenkirchen-Buer – Gelsenkirchen – Bochum-Höntrop – Bochum – Bochum-Langendreer (U21)

Of these extensive plans, only line U35 between Herne and Bochum Ruhr-University has been build to standard, all other constructed tunnels are being used by the metre-gauge tramways to cross Bochum and Gelsenkirchen city centres.

Stadtbahn tunnel sections
Opening date	Section	Used by	Notes
26 May 1979	Bochum, Bergmannsheil ramp – Bochum Hbf	308,318	
28 November 1981	Bochum Hbf – Ruhrstadion ramp	308,316,318	
1 September 1984	Gelsenkirchen, Rheinelbestraße ramp – Musiktheater	107,301,302	Musiktheater surface stop
2 September 1989	Herne, Schloß Strünkede – Bochum Hbf	U35	standard gauge
28 November 1993	Bochum Hbf – Wasserstraße ramp	U35	standard gauge
24 May 1994	Gelsenk. Heinrich-König-Platz – Ruhr-Zoo ramp	301	via Musiktheater tunnel platforms
26 January 2006	Bochum, Jacob-Mayer-Straße ramp – Lohring ramp	302,305,310	Hbf lower level
26 January 2006	Bochum, Rathaus ramp – Bochum Hbf	306,316	Hbf upper level
26 January 2006	connection tunnel 302,310 to 308,318	non-revenue	single track

The tunneled section from Bergmannsheil to Ruhrstadion ramp was the first completed in 1979-1981. During construction it was decided to raise the trackbed in stations and purchase Stadtbahnwagen type M cars to utilise the tunnels with tram routes before planned full completion of the system. The same applied for Gelsenkirchen's tunnel between Rheinelbestraße and Musiktheater stops in 1984.
The first significant change came about in 1989, when line U35 was completed between Herne and Bochum Hbf, using high-floor type B cars at high-floor platforms. The extension to Ruhr-Universität in 1993 upgraded a previous express tram to Stadtbahn standards. At Bochum Hbf, line U35 uses the inner tracks of the two lower level island platforms, with the outer tracks sitting vacant until 2006.
For Gelsenkirchen, 1994 saw the opening of the tunnel between Heinrich-König-Platz and Ruhr-Zoo, with line 301 now using the new tunnel platforms at Musiktheater, whilst 107 and 302 continue on the surface.
Finally, the cross-city tunnel in Bochum replaced the surface city centre route in 2006 between Jacob-Mayer-Straße and Lohring ramps. Two challenges that arose were allowing access to Engelsburg depot for trams 308/318 and 306, which previously also used the surface tracks. 306 now connects to the upper level of Bochum Hbf station through a fourth cross-city tunnel that enters a steep ramp next to Bochums city hall, crossing above the platforms of 302/310 on an underground bridge, and joining the 308/318 tunnel. Off this tunnel, a short single-track connection curve branches off, linking all metre-gauge routes.
A further upgrade of the metre-gauge network to full Stadtbahn standards or to neighbouring cities is not likely due to the political and financial constraints. The focus lies on improving the reliability and accessibility of the tramway network, as well as short extensions.

== Current service ==
=== Stadtbahn ===
BOGESTRA currently exclusively operates Line U35, which is integrated in the Rhine-Ruhr Stadtbahn network. The U35 route runs between Herne and Bochum, serving 21 stations (15 of which are underground, with 6 being above-ground).

Line	Route	Stations (underground)	Comments
U35	Schloss Strünkede – Herne Bahnhof – Bochum-Riemke – Bochum Hauptbahnhof – Ruhr-Universität – Bochum-Querenburg, Hustadt	21 (15)	Operated exclusively by BOGESTRA.

In addition, a second Stadtbahn line operates in the BOGESTRA region: one of the Essen Stadtbahn routes run by Ruhrbahn, Line U11, operates partially in the BOGESTRA transit area though only for its northernmost 3 stations.

Line	Route	Stations (underground)	Comments
U11	Gelsenkirchen-Horst Buerer Str. – Essen-Karnap – Altenessen – Berliner Platz – Essen Hbf – Rüttenscheid – Essen Messe/Gruga	23 (13)	Operated by Ruhrbahn. Only 3 stations in BOGESTRA area.

=== Tram ===
The tram system dates back to the 1890s. As of 2023, BOGESTRA exclusively operates the following nine tram lines:

Line	Route	Stations (underground)	Comments
301	Gelsenkirchen Hbf – Bismarck – Buer – Horst	34 (7)	
302	Gelsenkirchen-Buer Rathaus – Gelsenkirchen Hbf – Bochum Hbf – Laer Mitte - Langendreer S	44 (7)	
305	Bochum-Höntrop Kirche – Bochum Hbf – Laer Mitte – Langendreer S	25 (4)	
306	Wanne-Eickel Hbf – Bochum Hbf	21 (1)	Also operates as a Night Express.
308	Bochum-Gerthe Schürbankstraße – Bochum Hbf – Weitmar – Linden – Hattingen Mitte	38 (4)	
309	Langendreer S – Witten Papenholz – Witten Rathaus – Heven Dorf	14 (0)	
310	Bochum-Höntrop Kirche – Bochum Hbf – Langendreer Markt – Witten Papenholz – Witten Rathaus – Heven Dorf	39 (4)	
316	Wanne-Eickel Hbf – Bochum Hbf – Bochum-Gerthe Heinrichstraße	31 (2)	
318	Bochum-Gerthe Schürbankstraße – Bochum Hbf – Weitmar – Linden – Dahlhausen Bf.	32 (4)	Also operates as a Night Express.

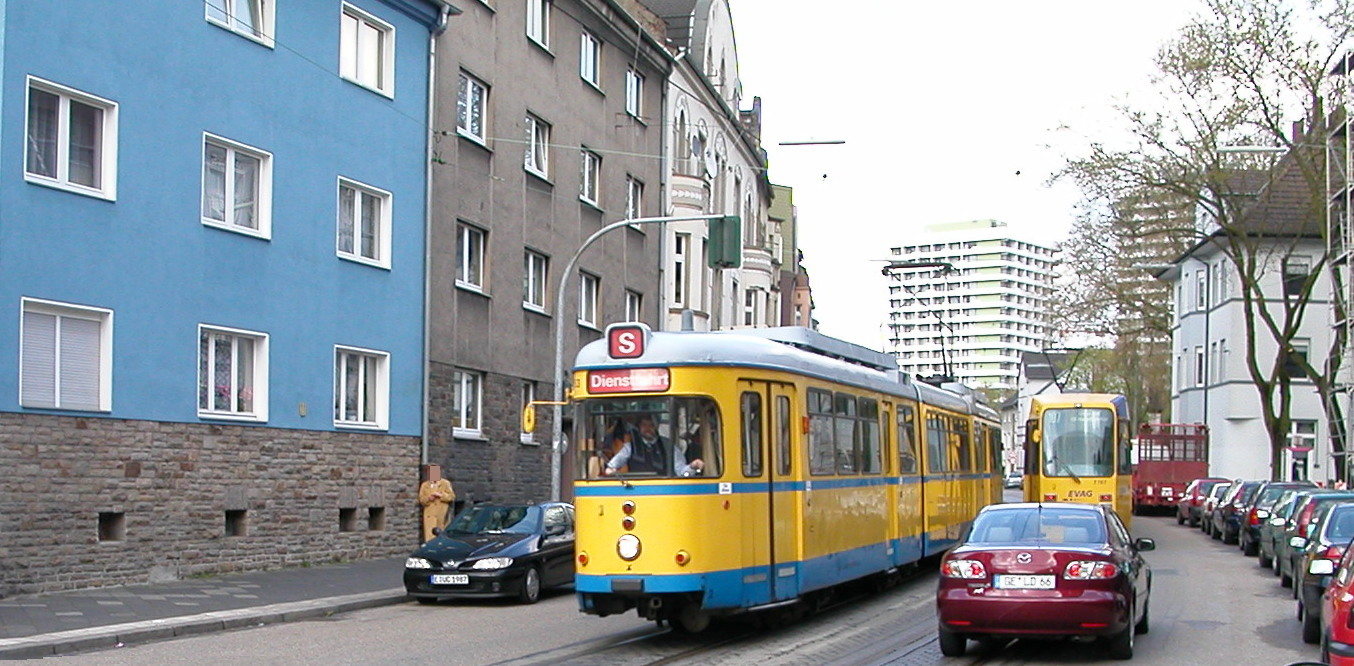
Tw 1161 on line 107 and Tw 1753 on a special trip on Feldmarkstraße in Gelsenkirchen April 2006

In addition, a tenth tram line also operates in the BOGESTRA region: a tram route in Essen run by Ruhrbahn, Line 107, operates partially in the BOGESTRA transit area though only for its northernmost 11 stations.

Line	Route	Stations	Comments
107	Gelsenkirchen Hbf – Feldmark – Trabrennbahn – Essen-Katernberg – Zeche Zollverein – Essen Hbf – Bredeney	34	Operated by Ruhrbahn. Only 11 stations in BOGESTRA area. On Saturday mornings, only operates to Trabrennbahn.

=== Bus ===
As of 2025, BOGESTRA operates 71 bus lines. BOGESTRA bus lines are generally given route numbers in the 300s (like the tram route numbers).

Line	Route	Comments
SB 33	Bochum-Wattenscheid, August-Bebel-Platz – Bochum-Querenburg, Ruhr-Universität	Express Bus Line
SB 36	Gelsenkirchen Hbf – Musiktheater – Heßler – Nordsternpark – Schloss Horst – Gladbeck Oberhof – Goetheplatz – Gladbeck West – Bottrop-Kirchhellen	Operated together with Vestische Straßenbahnen, Express Bus Line
SB 37	Bochum Hbf – Schauspielhaus – Königsallee – Henrichshütte – Hattingen – Niedersprockhövel – Haßlinghausen – Schwelm – Ennepetal	Operated together with VER Ennepe-Ruhr, Express Bus Line
SB 67	Bochum-Querenburg, Ruhr-Universität – Freizeitbad Heveney – Herbede – Steinenhaus – Niedersprockhövel – Haßlinghausen – Wuppertal Hbf	Operated by VER Ennepe-Ruhr, Express Bus Line
194	Gelsenkirchen Hbf – Rotthausen Achternbergstraße – Essen-Kray – Essen-Steele – Annental – Essen-Rellinghausen – Stadtwaldplatz – Villa Hügel – Bredeney – Essen-Haarzopf	Operated together with Ruhrbahn
320	Witten-Rüdinghausen – Witten-Annen – Marienhospital – Witten Rathaus – Witten Hbf – Witten-Heven – Freizeitbad Heveney – Bochum-Querenburg, Ruhr-Universität / – Herbede – Steinenhaus – Niedersprockhövel	
336	Bochum Hbf – Bochum Rathaus – Planetarium – Bochum-Grumme – Bochum-Harpen – Dortmund-Lütgendortmund	
339	Bochum-Querenburg, Ruhr-Universität – Bochum-Wiemelhausen – Bochum Hbf – Bochum Rathaus – Planetarium – Bochum-Grumme – Bochum-Harpen, Ruhr-Park	
340	Gelsenkirchen-Rotthausen – Musiktheater – Bulmke-Hüllen – Röhlinghausen – Wanne-Eickel Hbf – Herne-Holsterhausen	
342	Gelsenkirchen-Buer, Westfälische Hochschule – Schaffrath – Bahnhof Buer Süd – Sutum – Gelsenkirchen-Erle – ZOOM-Erlebniswelt – Wanne-Eickel Hbf	
344	Bochum-Wattenscheid, Freiheitstraße – August-Bebel-Platz – Wattenscheid Bahnhof – Wattenscheid-Höntrop – Eppendorf – Bochum-Weitmar – Bochum-Querenburg, Ruhr-Universität – Hustadt – Bochum-Querenburg, Hochschule Bochum	
345	Bochum-Dahlhausen – Eppendorf – Wattenscheider Straße – Bochum Rathaus – Bochum Hbf – Bochum-Wiemelhausen – Altenbochum – Bochum-Laer – Bochum-Werne – Bochum-Langendreer, Knappschafts-Krankenhaus	
346	Bochum-Wattenscheid, Freiheitstraße – August-Bebel-Platz – Wattenscheid-Höntrop – Bochum-Weitmar – Bochum-Querenburg, Ruhr-Universität – Hustadt – Bochum-Querenburg, Hochschule Bochum	
348	Gelsenkirchen-Hüllen, Konradstraße – Bulmke-Hüllen – Gelsenkirchen Hbf – Gelsenkirchen-Rotthausen – Essen-Kraspothshöhe – Essen-Katernberg	
349	Bochum Hbf – Bochum-Wiemelhausen – Bochum-Weitmar / – Bochum-Stiepel, Haarstraße	
350	Bochum Hbf – Schauspielhaus – Bochum-Wiemelhausen – Bochum-Stiepel – Steinenhaus – Blankenstein – Welper – Henrichshütte – Hattingen Mitte	
352	Bochum-Hofstede – Bochum-Hamme – Wattenscheider Straße – Bochum-Eppendorf	
353	Bochum-Weitmar - Bochum-Wiemelhausen – Schauspielhaus – Bochum Hbf – Bochum Rathaus – Bochum-Grumme – Hiltrop – Bochum-Gerthe – Schürbankstraße – Castrop-Rauxel Münsterplatz	
354	Bochum-Weitmar, Sundern – Bochum-Wiemelhausen – Bochum Hbf – Planetarium – Bochum-Grumme – Bochum-Riemke	Operated using electric busses
355	Bochum-Dahlhausen – Eppendorf – Bochum-Ehrenfeld – Bochum Rathaus – Bochum Hbf – Hauptfriedhof – Bochum-Laer – Bochum-Werne – Bochum-Langendreer	
356	Bochum Hbf – Bochum-Wiemelhausen – Bochum-Querenburg, Ruhr-Universität	
357	Bochum-Dahlhausen – Eisenbahnmuseum – Bochum-Linden – Bochum-Oberdahlhausen	
358	Bochum-Querenburg, Ruhr-Universität – Altenbochum – Bochum-Laer – Hauptfriedhof – Bochum-Harpen, Ruhr Park	
359	Bochum-Dahlhausen – Bochum-Linden – Rauendahl – Hattingen – Hattingen-Holthausen, Klinik Holthausen	
363	Wattenscheid-Südfeldmark – Freiheitstraße – August-Bebel-Platz – Wattenscheid-Höntrop Kirche – Essen-Steele	
364	Bochum-Langendreer – Bochum-Werne – Bochum-Harpen, Ruhr Park – Bochum-Gerthe – Schürbankstraße – Castrop-Rauxel Münsterplatz	
365	Bochum Hbf – Bochum Rathaus – Schauspielhaus – Bochum-Weitmar – Wattenscheid-Höntrop – Wattenscheid Bahnhof – August-Bebel-Platz – Freiheitstraße – Wattenscheid-Leithe, Kaufland Ottostraße	
366	Bochum-Langendreer – Bochum-Harpen, Ruhr Park – Hiltrop – Herne Bahnhof – Bochum-Riemke	
368	Bochum-Harpen, Ruhr Park – Altenbochum – Bochum Hbf – Bochum Rathaus – Bochum-Hamme – Hordel – Röhlinghausen – Wanne-Eickel Hbf	
369	Dortmund-Lütgendortmund – Bochum-Langendreer – Dortmund-Lütgendortmund	Ring Line
370	Bochum-Stiepel – Bochum-Querenburg, Ruhr-Universität – Bochum-Langendreer – Bochum-Werne – Dortmund-Lütgendortmund	
372	Bochum-Querenburg, Ruhr-Universität – Bochum-Laer – Bochum-Langendreer – Bochum-Werne	
374	Bochum-Querenburg, Ruhr-Universität – Witten-Heven – Herbede	
375	Witten-Annen – Marienhospital – Witten Rathaus – Witten Hbf – Witten–Heven – Bochum-Querenburg, Ruhr-Universität / – Durchholzer Platz – Witten-Herbede	
376	Hagen-Vorhalle Bahnhof – Herdecke – Auf dem Schnee – Marienhospital – Witten Rathaus – Witten Hbf	
378	Bochum-Querenburg, Ruhr-Universität – Bochum-Langendreer – Dortmund-Lütgendortmund – Castrop-Rauxel Münsterplatz	
379	Bochum-Harpen, Ruhr Park – Bochum-Werne – Bochum-Langendreer – Marienhospital – Witten Rathaus – Witten Hbf – Witten-Bommern – Durchholzer Platz – Haßlinghausen	
380	Gelsenkirchen Hbf – Musiktheater – Gelsenkirchen-Schalke – Schloss Berge – Gelsenkirchen-Buer Rathaus	Operated using electric busses
381	Gelsenkirchen-Rotthausen – Gelsenkirchen Hbf – Gelsenkirchen-Schalke – Gelsenkirchen-Erle – Gelsenkirchen-Buer Rathaus / – Gelsenkirchen-Resse	
382	Gelsenkirchen-Bismarck, Trinenkamp – Gelsenkirchen Zoo Bahnhof – Haverkamp – Bulmke-Hüllen – Gelsenkirchen Hbf – Gelsenkirchen-Feldmark	
383	Gelsenkirchen-Horst – Schloss Horst – Nordsternpark – Heßler – Musiktheater – Gelsenkirchen Hbf – Gelsenkirchen-Ückendorf – Wattenscheid-Günnigfeld – Gelsenkirchen-Bulmke-Hüllen	
384	Wanne-Eickel Hbf – Haverkamp – Trinenkamp – Gelsenkirchen-Schalke – Gelsenkirchen-Heßler	
385	Gelsenkirchen Hbf – Neustadt – Gelsenkirchen-Ückendorf – Röhlinghausen – Herne-Eickel – Bochum-Riemke	
386	Bochum-Wattenscheid, Schlaraffiastraße – Wattenscheid Bahnhof – Freiheitstraße – August-Bebel-Platz – Wattenscheid-Westenfeld	
388	Gelsenkirchen Hbf – Gelsenkirchen-Feldmark – Gelsenkirchen-Ückendorf, Marienhospital	Operated using electric busses
389	Gelsenkirchen Hbf – Marienhospital – Wattenscheid-Leithe – Freiheitstraße – August-Bebel-Platz – Wattenscheid Bahnhof – Wattenscheid-Höntrop	
390	Bochum-Linden – Eppendorf – Wattenscheid-Höntrop – August-Bebel-Platz – Freiheitstraße – Wattenscheid-Günnigfeld – Röhlinghausen Markt – Herne-Eickel – Herne Bahnhof	
392	Gelsenkirchen-Erle – Stadthafen – ZOOM-Erlebniswelt – Gelsenkirchen Zoo Bahnhof – Haverkamp – Gelsenkirchen-Bismarck	
395	Bochum-Harpen, Ruhr Park – Bochum-Grumme – Hofstede – Herne-Holsterhausen	
396	Gelsenkirchen-Buer Rathaus – Schaffrath – Schloss Horst – Gelsenkirchen-Horst	
397	Gelsenkirchen-Buer Rathaus – Gelsenkirchen–Erle – Gelsenkirchen-Resser Mark	
398	Gelsenkirchen-Buer Rathaus – Gelsenkirchen-Erle – Gelsenkirchen-Sutum	
399	Gelsenkirchen-Buer Rathaus – Gelsenkirchen-Buer, Westfälische Hochschule	

=== Night express bus ===
In addition, there are a total of 15 bus lines whose operation only takes place at nights before weekend and federal state holidays.

Line	Route
NE1	Bochum Hbf – Stahlhausen – Wattenscheid – Günnigfeld – Hordel – Hamme – Grumme – Bochum Hbf
NE2	Bochum Hbf – Grumme – Hiltrop – Gerthe – Kirchharpen – Kornharpen – Grumme – Bochum Hbf
NE3	Bochum Hbf – Altenbochum – Laer – Werne – Langendreer – Laer – Altenbochum – Bochum Hbf
NE4	Bochum Hbf – Stiepel – Hattingen-Welper – Hattingen Mitte – Holthausen – Sprockhövel – Schwelm
NE5	Bochum Hbf – Stahlhausen – Wattenscheid-Eppendorf – BO-Dahlhausen
NE6	Bochum Hbf – Stahlhausen – Wattenscheid-Höntrop – Westenfeld – Wattenscheid – Höntrop – Stahlhausen – Bochum Hbf
NE7	Bochum Hbf – Steinkuhl – Querenburg – Hustadt – Weitmar – Wiemelhausen – Bochum Hbf
NE8	Bochum Hbf – Wiemelhausen – Weitmar – Hustadt – Querenburg – Steinkuhl – Bochum Hbf
NE10	Bochum Hbf – Wattenscheid – Gelsenkirchen-Ückendorf – Schalke – Buer Rathaus
NE11	Gelsenkirchen Hbf – Schalke – Berger Feld – Erle – Buer Rathaus
NE12	Gelsenkirchen-Ückendorf – Gelsenkirchen Hbf – Bulmke-Hüllen – Haverkamp – Bismarck – Erle – Resse – Buer Rathaus
NE13	Gelsenkirchen Hbf – Ückendorf – Bochum-Wattenscheid – Leithe – Essen-Kray – Schonnebeck – Gelsenkirchen-Rotthausen – Gelsenkirchen Hbf
NE14	Gelsenkirchen-Rotthausen – Gelsenkirchen Hbf – Heßler – Horst – Beckhausen – Buer Rathaus
NE17	Bochum-Querenburg – WIT-Herbede – Witten Hbf – Bommern – Rathaus – Heven – Bochum-Querenburg
NE18	Bochum-Langendreer – Witten Hbf – Rathaus – Annen – Stockum – Rathaus – Bochum-Langendreer

== See also ==
- Rhein-Ruhr Stadtbahn
- Verkehrsverbund Rhein-Ruhr (VRR)
- Rhine-Ruhr S-Bahn
- List of rapid transit systems
