= Riemke (Bochum) =

Coordinates: 51°30′36″N 7°12′39″E

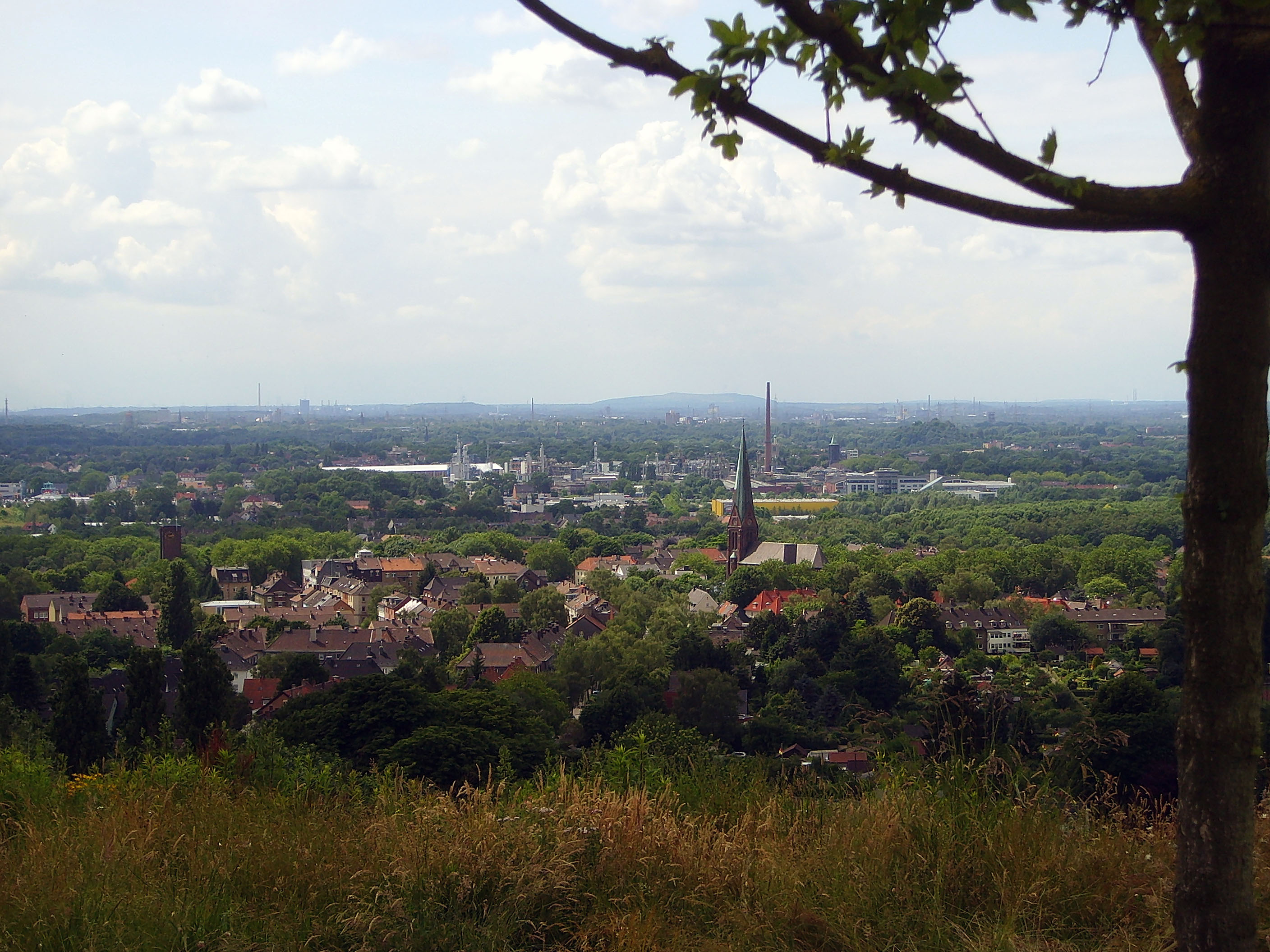
View over Riemke from the Tippelsberg

Riemke is a major district of the city of Bochum, Ruhr Area, North Rhine-Westphalia, Germany. Within Bochum, Riemke borders the districts of Bergen-Hiltrop, Grumme and Hofstede. On the north it also borders the city of Herne.

Riemke was mentioned for the first time as "Rymbecke" in the 9th century. On 1 April 1926 the municipality of Riemke was integrated into the city of Bochum.

It is a working class district. It was known for the large Nokia works. The factory closed in May 2008.

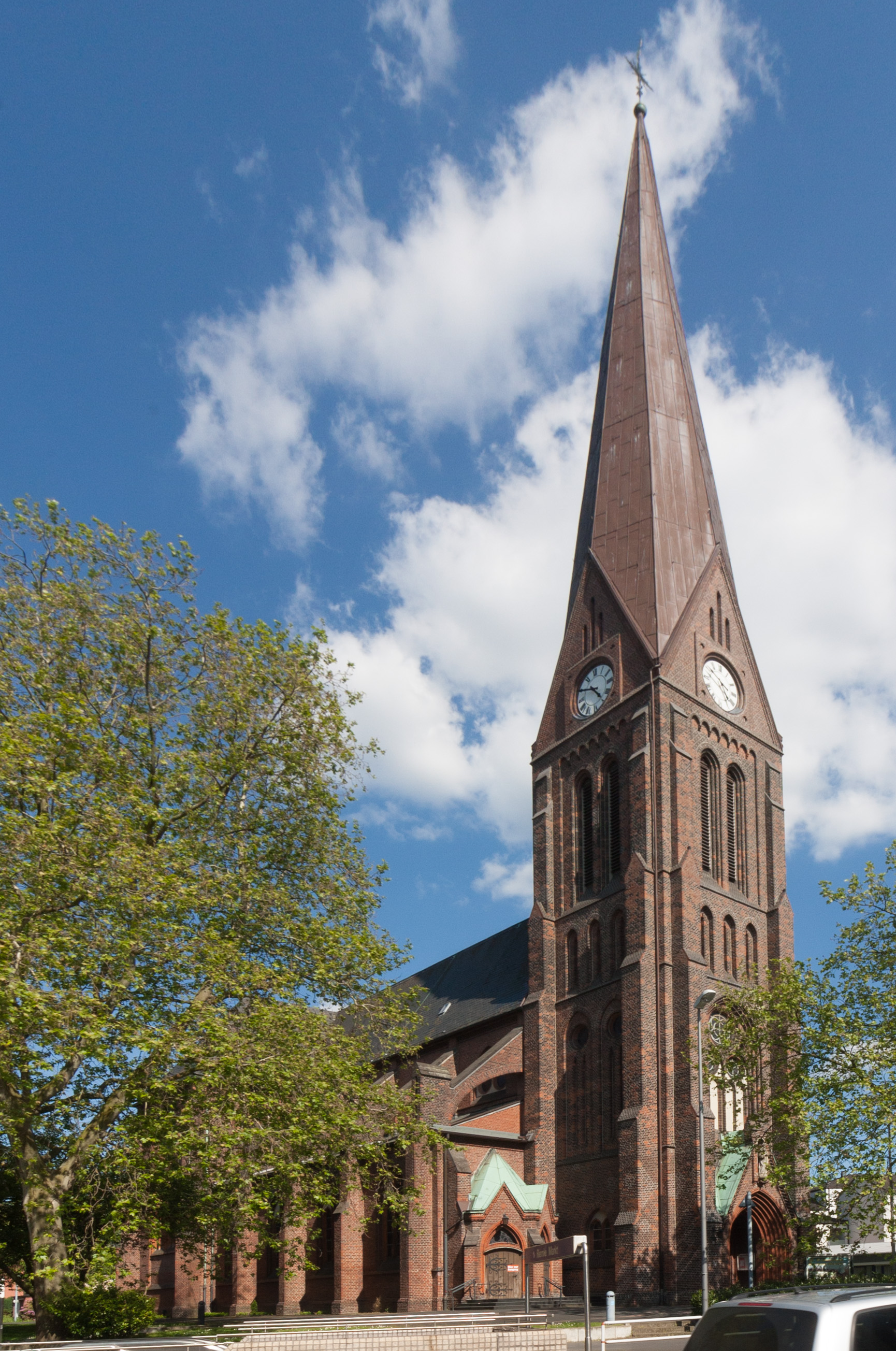
St Franziskus' church

In the middle of Riemke are the market square and the 19th-century St Franziskus' church, one of the landmarks of the district.

The district includes the highest point in the north of Bochum, the Tippelsberg. In the east of Riemke is the Naturschutzgebiet Zillertal (Zillertal nature reserve).

In terms of transport links, Riemke is on the Bundesautobahn 43 (A43). It has a rail connection on the line Bochum-Gelsenkirchen (Glückauf-Bahn).
