= Universität Essen station =

Underground station in Essen

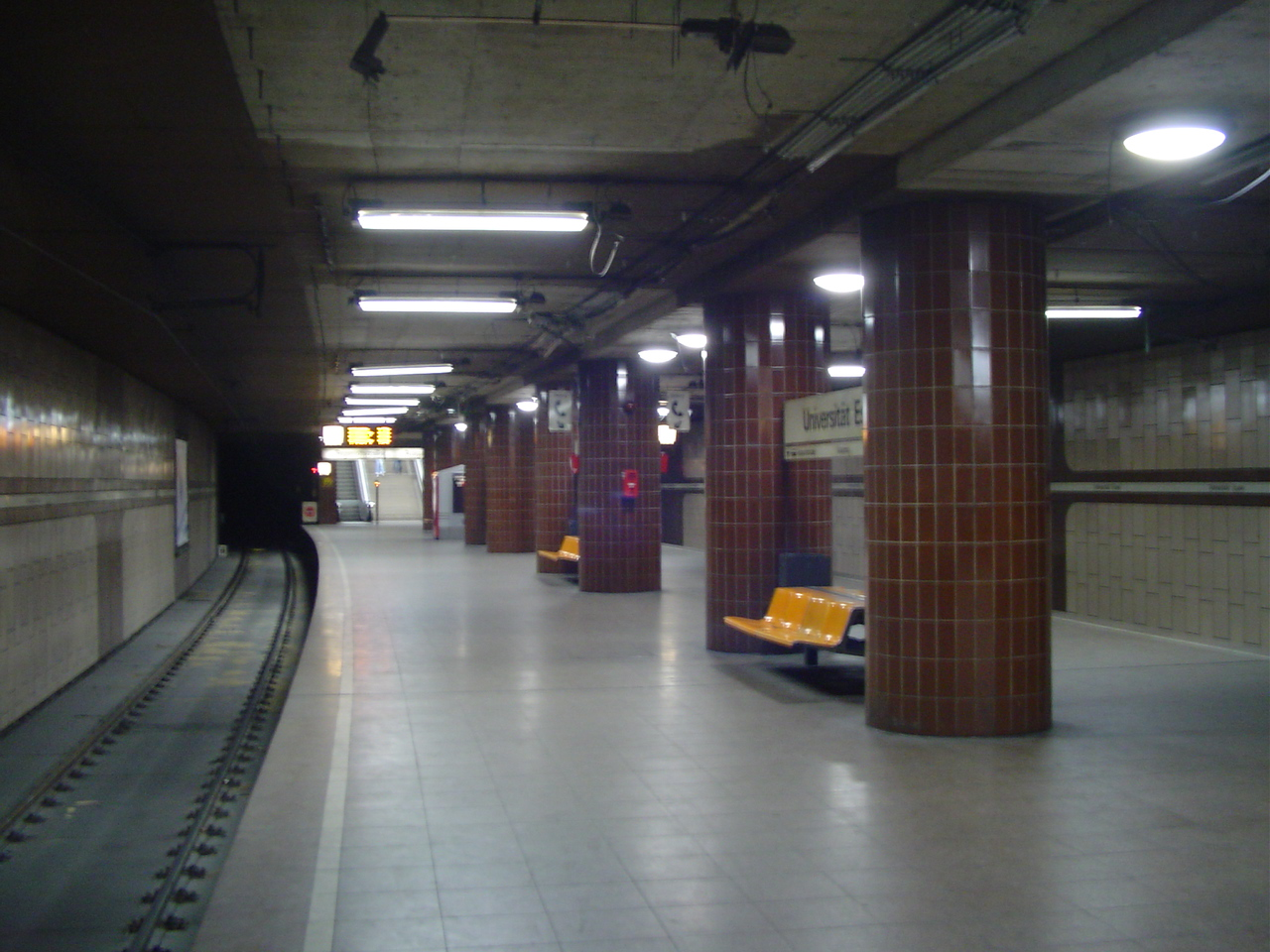
Universität Essen station

Universität Essen (Essen University) is an underground station of the Essen Stadtbahn located in the northwest of the Essen Stadtkern district. It is located at the University of Duisburg-Essen campus. Today, lines U11 and U17 stop at the station.

== History ==
The station was opened on November 27th, 1981, as part of the North-South-Line of the Essen Stadtbahn. At the time of opening, the then new U17 line was established and the preexisting U18 line was extended from Hirschlandplatz to the new university station. 5 years later, the North-South-Line was extended from the University to the Altenessen Bahnhof station.

== Location and Layout ==
The station is located at the crossroads of Grillostraße/Hans-Böckler-Straße and Segerothstraße/Bottroper Straße, directly on the university campus. The station has two tracks with a platform between them, accessible via stairs or escalators. There is no lift in operation.

Preceding station	Rhine-Ruhr Stadtbahn	Following station
Berliner Platz towards Messe West-Süd Gruga	U11	Bamlerstraße towards Buerer Straße
Berliner Platz towards Margarethenhöhe	U17	Bamlerstraße towards Karlsplatz
