= Bamlerstraße station =

Railway station in Germany

Coordinates: 51°28′28″N 7°00′02″E

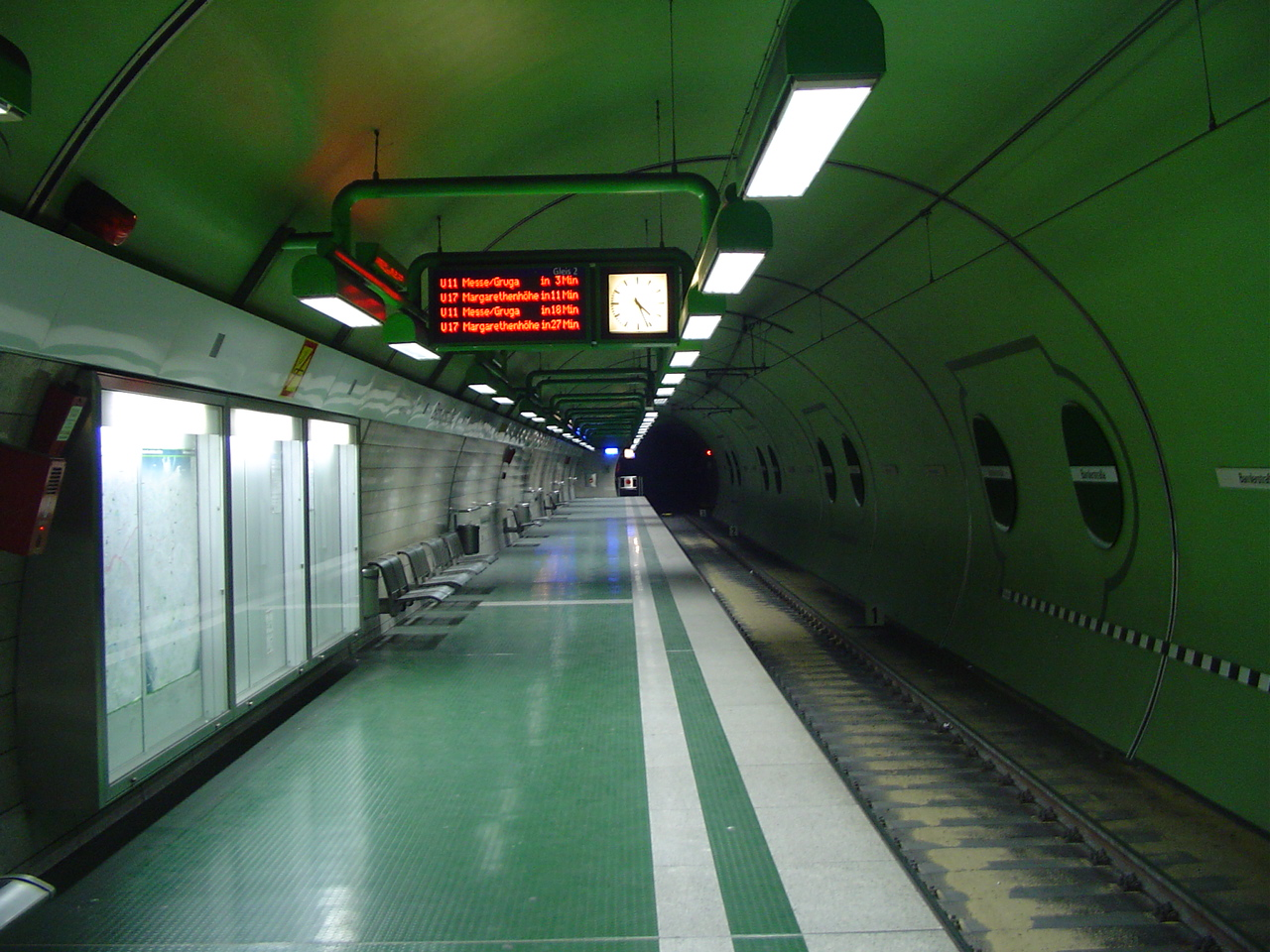
Bamlerstraße station

Bamlerstraße is an underground station of the Essen Stadtbahn on the boundaries of Altenessen and Nordviertel, both being boroughs of Essen. Lines U11 and U17 call the station, as well as bus line 196. It is located at the crossroads of Bamlerstraße and Riedingerstraße. The station has two tracks. There is a lift in operation.

The station opened on 24 May 1998.

| Preceding station | Rhine-Ruhr Stadtbahn | Following station |
|---|---|---|
| Universität Essen towards Messe West-Süd Gruga | U11 | Bäuminghausstraße towards Buerer Straße |
| Universität Essen towards Margarethenhöhe | U17 | Bäuminghausstraße towards Karlsplatz |
