= Bäuminghausstraße station =

Railway station in Germany

Coordinates: 51°28′45″N 7°00′13″E

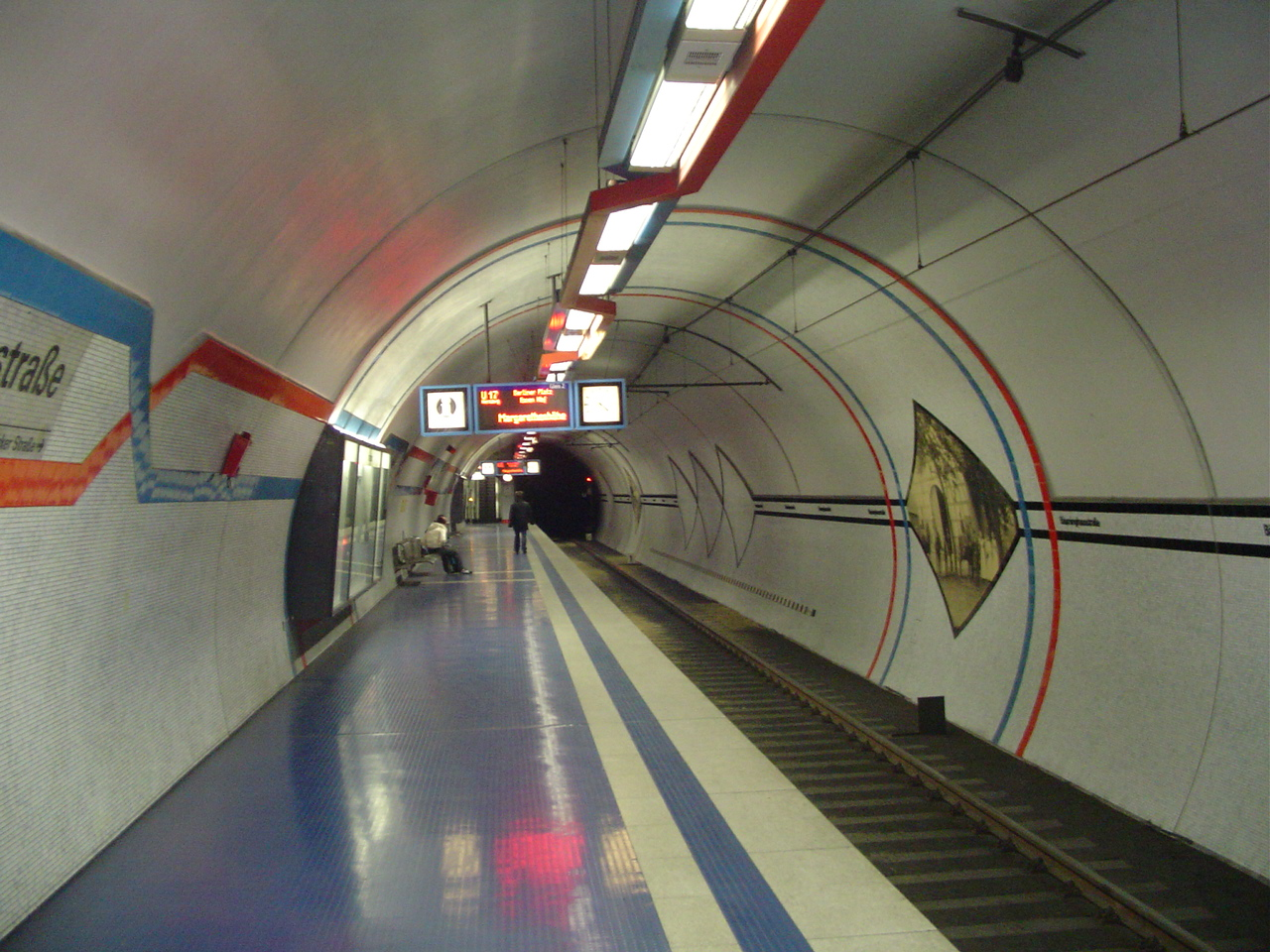
Bäuminghausstraße station

Bäuminghausstraße is an underground station of the Essen Stadtbahn in Altenessen, Essen. Lines U11 and U17 call the station. It is located at the crossroads of Gladbecker Straße and Bäuminghausstraße. The station has two tracks. There is a lift in operation.

The station opened on 24 May 1998. The Stadion Bäuminghausstraße is close to the station.

Preceding station	Rhine-Ruhr Stadtbahn	Following station
Bamlerstraße towards Messe West-Süd Gruga	U11	Essen-Altenessen towards Buerer Straße
Bamlerstraße towards Margarethenhöhe	U17	Essen-Altenessen towards Karlsplatz
