= Berliner Platz station =

Light rail station in Essen, Germany

Coordinates: 51.459°N 7.004°E

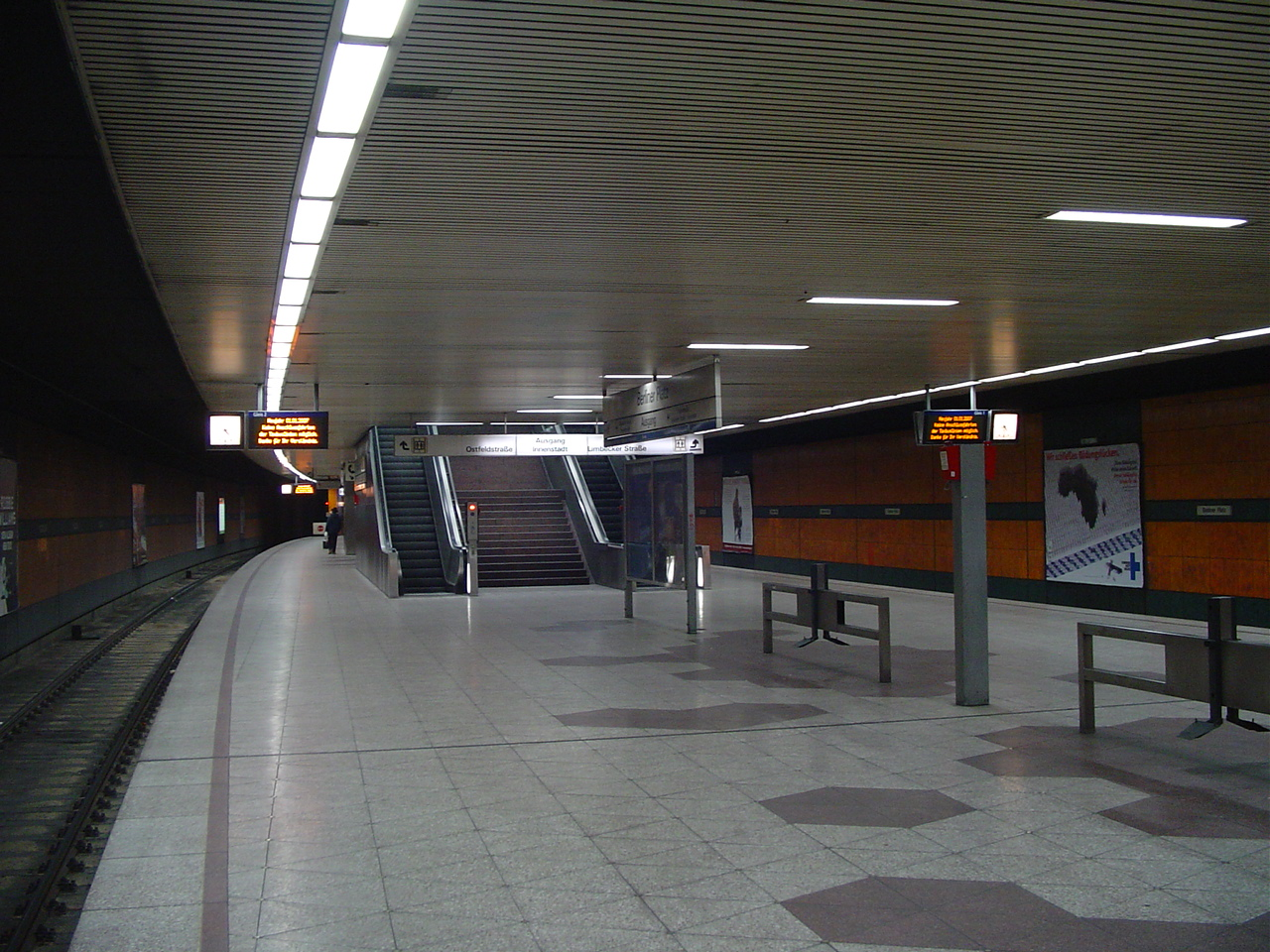
Berliner Platz station, second level, in 2006

Berliner Platz (Berlin square) is an underground station of the Essen Stadtbahn in the Stadtkern district, Essen. It is one of three crossing stations of Essen Stadtbahn and Essen trams, the others being Essen Hauptbahnhof and Essen Rathaus (Essen City Hall). Today, lines U11 and U17 call the station, as well as line U18 which terminates here.

== Building ==
The station is located below the Berliner Platz square with its traffic roundabout. It has three levels, the upper level is a feeder level for pedestrians, Essen Stadtbahn light rail operates on the second, Essen trams on the third, which is the deepest tram station in Essen. There are lifts in operation. Since 11 July 2016 also the third and lowest level can be reached by them.

The station opened on 27 November 1981. The third level went into operation in 1991, before that the trams ran above ground on the Berlin square.

| Preceding station | Rhine-Ruhr Stadtbahn | Following station |
|---|---|---|
| Hirschlandplatz towards Messe West-Süd Gruga | U11 | Universität Essen towards Buerer Straße |
| Hirschlandplatz towards Margarethenhöhe | U17 | Universität Essen towards Karlsplatz |
| Hirschlandplatz towards Mülheim (Ruhr) Hbf | U18 | Terminus |
