= Kaiser-Wilhelm-Park station =

Railway station in Germany

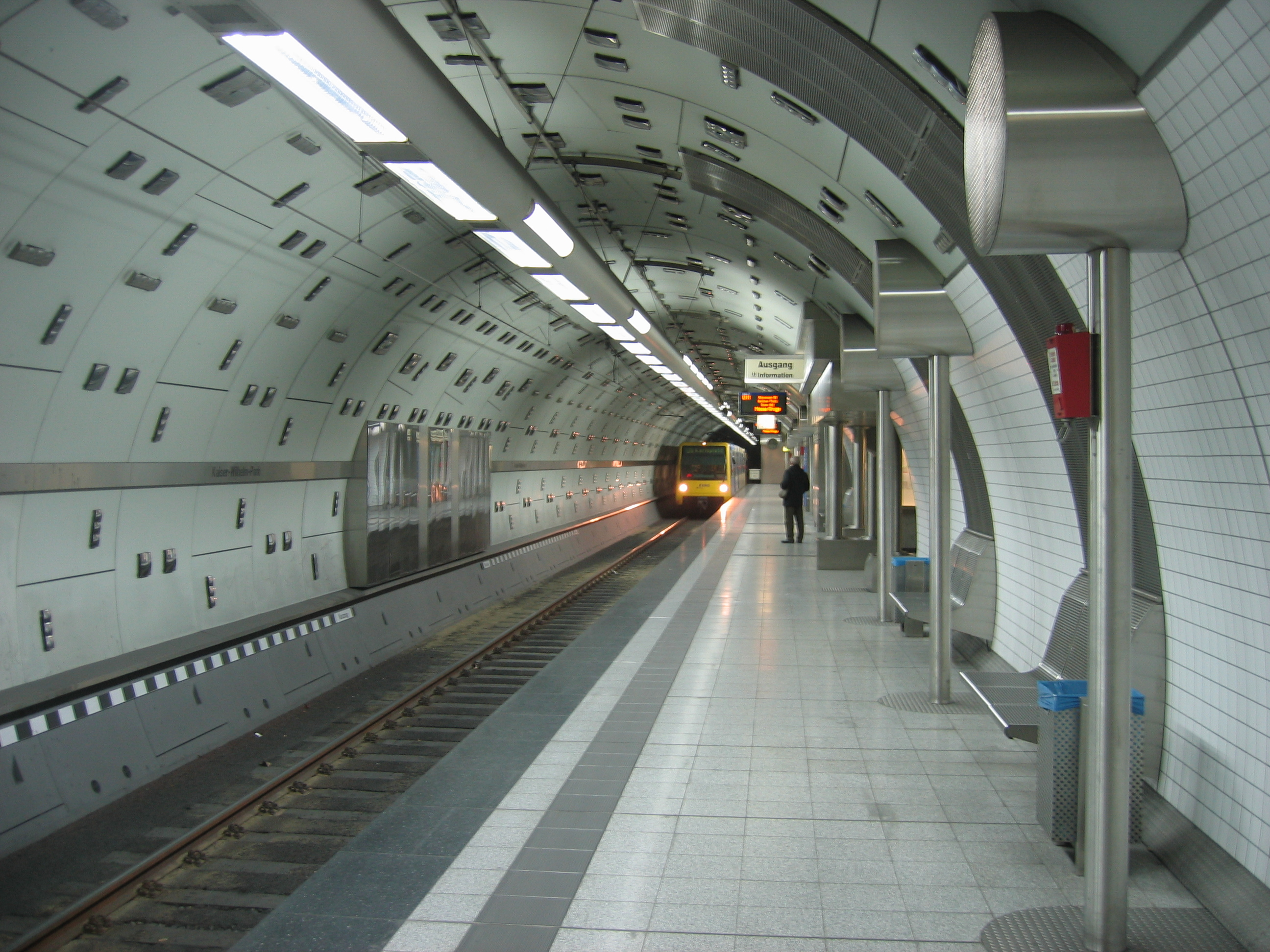
Kaiser-Wilhelm-Park station

Kaiser-Wilhelm-Park is an underground station of the Essen Stadtbahn in Altenessen, Essen. Lines U11 and U17 call the station as well as buses 172 and NE1. It is located below Altenessener Straße near Stankeitstraße. The station has two tracks. There is a lift in operation.

The station opened on 30 September 2001. The Kaiser-Wilhelm-Park is located nearby.

Preceding station	Rhine-Ruhr Stadtbahn	Following station
Essen-Altenessen towards Messe West-Süd Gruga	U11	Altenessen Mitte towards Buerer Straße
Essen-Altenessen towards Margarethenhöhe	U17	Altenessen Mitte towards Karlsplatz
