= Altenessen Mitte station =

Light rail station in Essen, Germany

Coordinates: 51.4957°N 7.0082°E

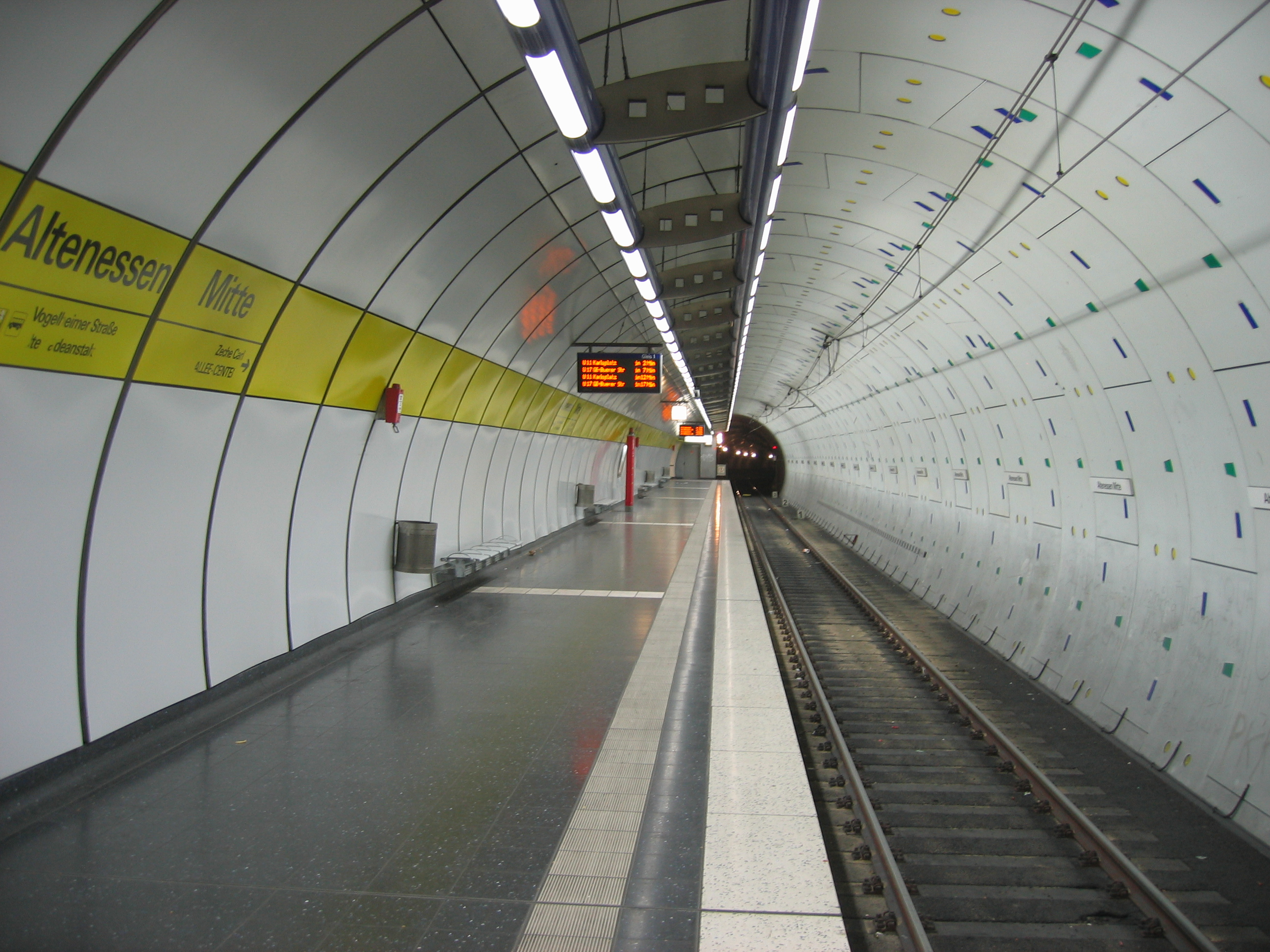
Altenessen Mitte station

Altenessen Mitte (Altenessen Centre) is an underground station of the Essen Stadtbahn in Altenessen, Essen. Lines U11 and U17 call the station as well as buses 170, 172, E84, E86, and NE15. It is located below Altenessener Straße between Vogelheimer Straße and Winkhausstraße. The station has two tracks. There is a lift in operation.

The station opened on 30 September 2001. The shopping mall of AlleeCenter is located nearby, also Zeche Carl cultural centre.

Preceding station	Rhine-Ruhr Stadtbahn	Following station
Kaiser-Wilhelm-Park towards Messe West-Süd Gruga	U11	Karlsplatz towards Buerer Straße
Kaiser-Wilhelm-Park towards Margarethenhöhe	U17	Karlsplatz Terminus
