= Essen Zollverein Nord station =

Railway station in Essen, Germany

Essen Zollverein Nord
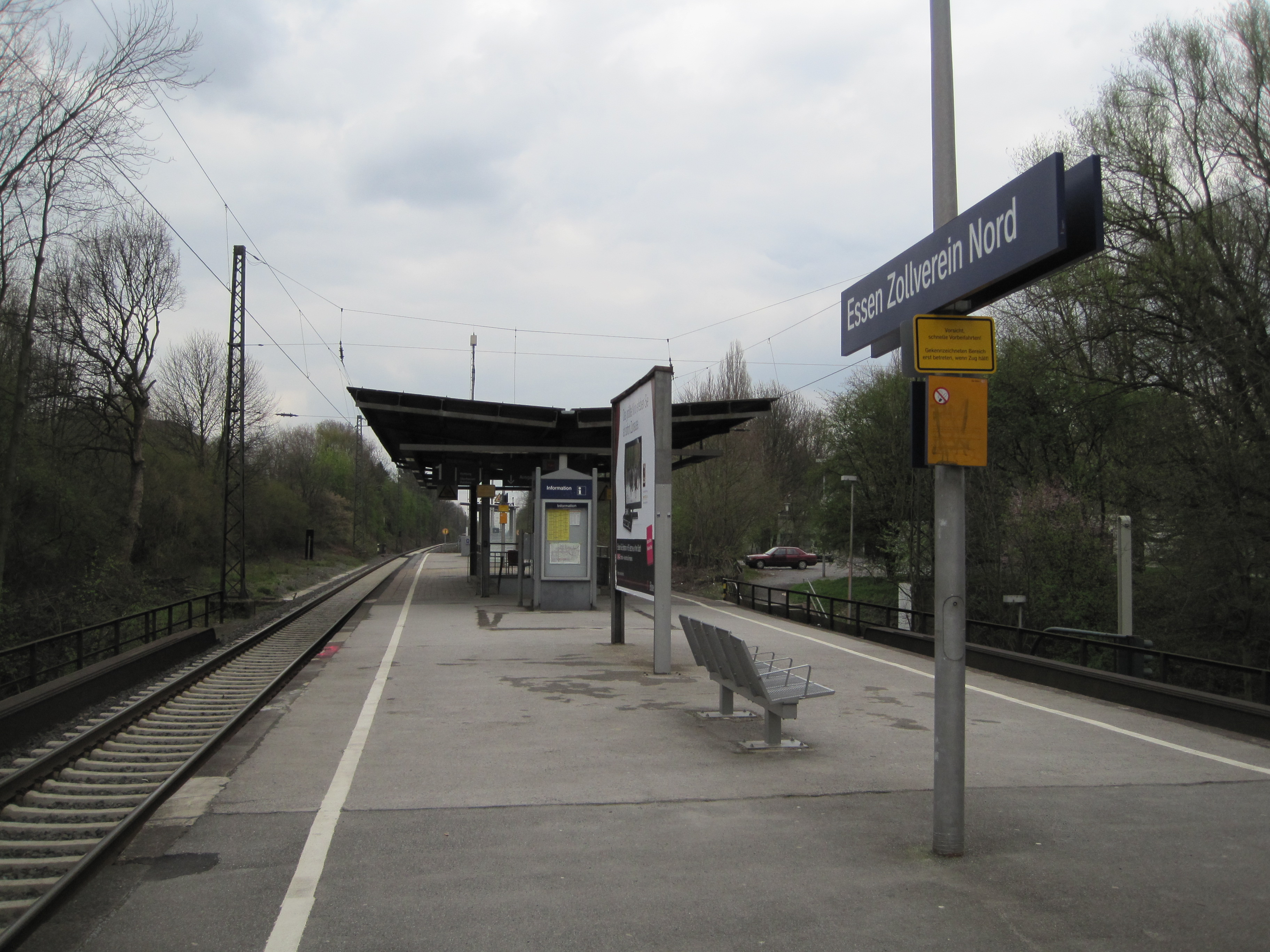
- Platform of Essen Zollverein Nord in 2010

General information
- Location: Essen, NRW; Germany
- Coordinates: 51°29′37″N 07°02′49″E
- Owner: Deutsche Bahn
- Operator: DB Netz; DB Station&Service
- Line: Duisburg–Dortmund railway
- Platforms: 2

Construction
- Accessible: Yes

Other information
- Station code: 1706
- DS100 code: EEKB
- Category: 6
- Fare zone: VRR: 354
- Website: www.bahnhof.de

History
- Opened: 1887

Services
| Preceding station | DB Regio NRW | Following station |
|---|---|---|
| Essen-Altenessen towards Duisburg Hbf | RB 32 | Gelsenkirchen Hbf towards Dortmund Hbf |
| Preceding station | VIAS | Following station |
| Essen-Altenessen towards Mönchengladbach Hbf | RB 35 | Gelsenkirchen Hbf Terminus |
Location

Essen Zollverein Nord is a railway station situated in close proximity to the Zollverein Coal Mine Industrial Complex on the Duisburg–Dortmund railway situated in Essen in the German state of North Rhine-Westphalia. It is classified by Deutsche Bahn as a category 6 station. It was originally named Zollverein, renamed Caternberg in 1897, Caternberg Süd between 1897 and 1905, Katernberg Süd between 1905 and 1912, Essen-Katernberg Süd in 1949 and Essen-Zollverein Nord on 13 December 2009. A station building was built in 1897, but was demolished between 1960 and 1990.

It is served by Regionalbahn lines RB32 (Rhein-Emscher-Bahn) and RB35 (Emscher-Niederrhein-Bahn), Essen tramway 107 (Gelsenkirchen Hbf + Hbf – Bredeney) and by bus routes 170 (Schonnebeck – Kray – Steele + Altenessen - Borbeck) and 183 (Katernberger Markt + Altenessen – Karlsplatz) operated by Ruhrbahn.
