= Karlsplatz station =

Karlsplatz is the name of several transit stations in Central Europe:

- Karlsplatz (Vienna U-Bahn) in Vienna, Austria
- Karlsplatz Stadtbahn Station, a disused station in Vienna, Austria
- Karlsplatz station (Essen) in Essen, Germany
- Munich Karlsplatz station in Munich, Germany
