= Philharmonie station =

Railway station in Germany

Coordinates: 51.4453°N 7.0088°E

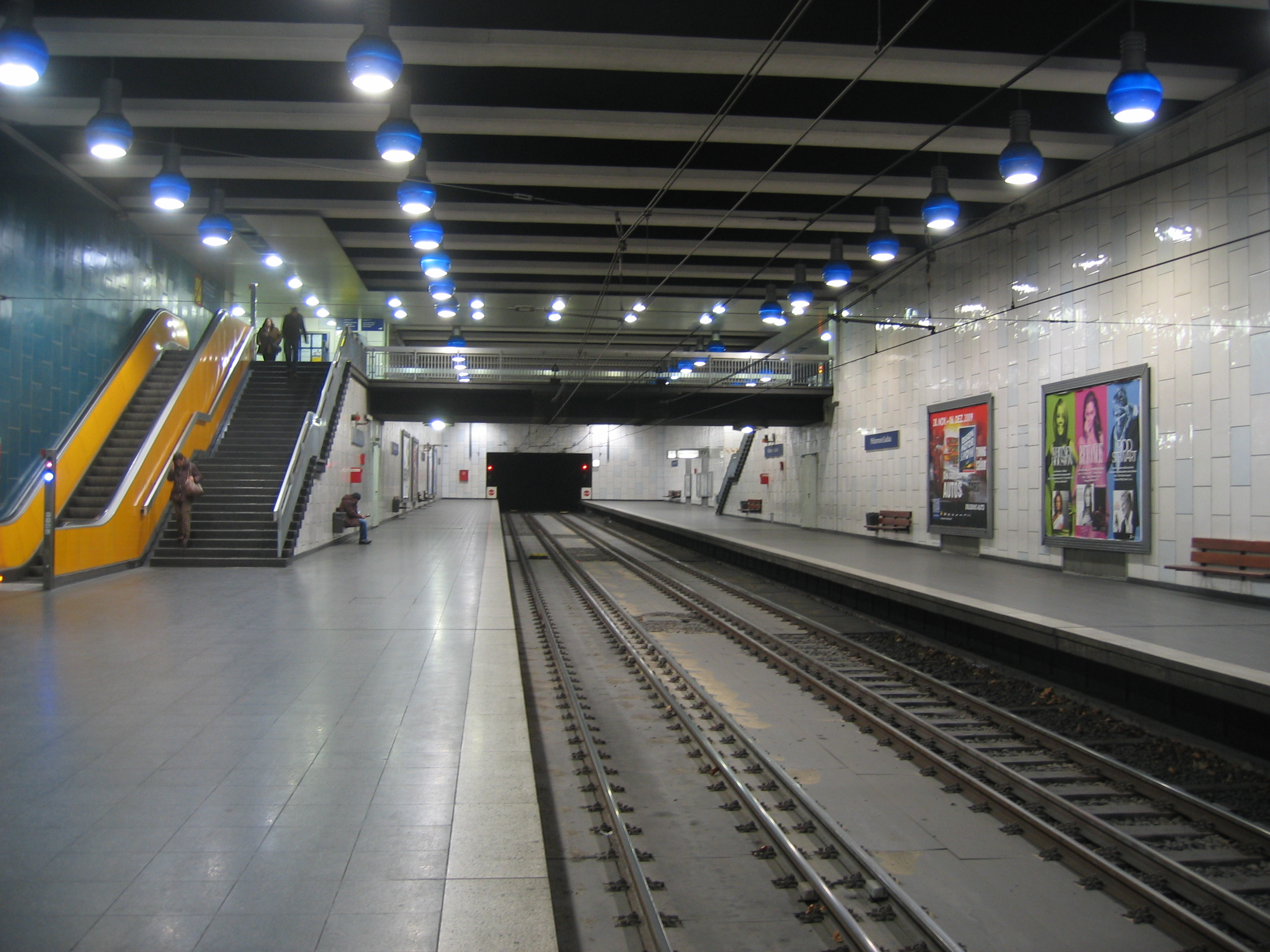
Philharmonie station

Philharmonie (Philharmonic Hall) is an underground station of the Essen Stadtbahn in the Südviertel district, Essen near the Saalbau Essen, which is referenced by the name of the station. Today, Stadtbahn line U11 as well as tram lines 107 and 108 and night services NE8 and NE13 call the station. It is the oldest Stadtbahn station in Essen.

== Building ==
The station is located below the street of Huyssenallee near the Philharmonie of Saalbau Essen. The station has four entrances and two tracks with side platforms. Mixed-gauge tracks with three rails are used to allow Stadtbahn trains as well as trams to use the station.

== History ==
The station opened on 5 October 1967 along with the first, 522 meters long tunnel under the Friedrichstraße/Hohenzollernstraße, the former B1 road. Tram lines to Rüttenscheid, to Bredeney, Rellinghausen and Gruga used it.

Initially, the station was called Saalbau, since 2004 Philharmonie/Saalbau. Later, the addition Saalbau was deleted.

Preceding station	Rhine-Ruhr Stadtbahn	Following station
Rüttenscheider Stern towards Messe West-Süd Gruga	U11	Essen Hbf towards Buerer Straße
