= Hirschlandplatz station =

Light rail station in Essen, Germany

Coordinates: 51.454°N 7.009°E

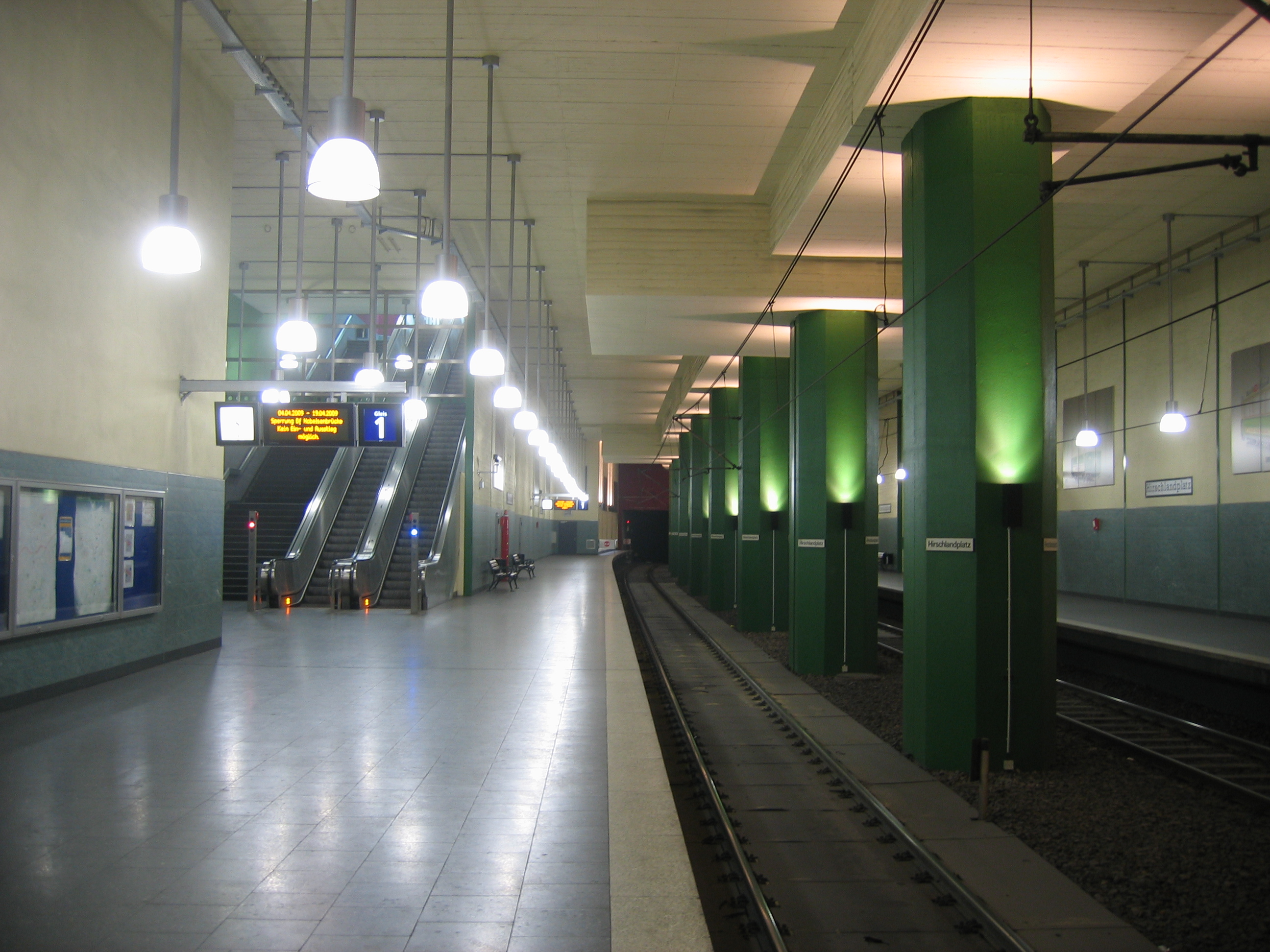
Hirschlandplatz station, 2009

Hirschlandplatz (Hirschland square) is an underground station of the Essen Stadtbahn in the Stadtkern district, Essen near the Grillo theater. Today, lines U11, U17 and U18 call the station.

== Building ==
The station is located below the Hirschlandplatz west of Kettwiger Straße, the main shopping road of the city. It has two levels. The upper level is a feeder level for pedestrians, the lower station hall has two tracks with side platforms.

== History ==
The station opened on Pentecost 1977 under the name of Wiener Platz (Vienna square), the former name of the square. 1985 the square was renamed into Hirschlandplatz after the Jewish Hirschland family, who founded the Simon Hirschland Bank and was expropriated by the National Socialists in 1938.

Until the opening of the track to Berliner Platz on 27 November 1981, the station was the terminus of the first line of the Essen Stadtbahn.

Preceding station	Rhine-Ruhr Stadtbahn	Following station
Essen Hbf towards Messe West-Süd Gruga	U11	Berliner Platz towards Buerer Straße
Essen Hbf towards Margarethenhöhe	U17	Berliner Platz towards Karlsplatz
Essen Hbf towards Mülheim (Ruhr) Hbf	U18	Berliner Platz Terminus
