= Essen Stadtbahn =

German light rail network

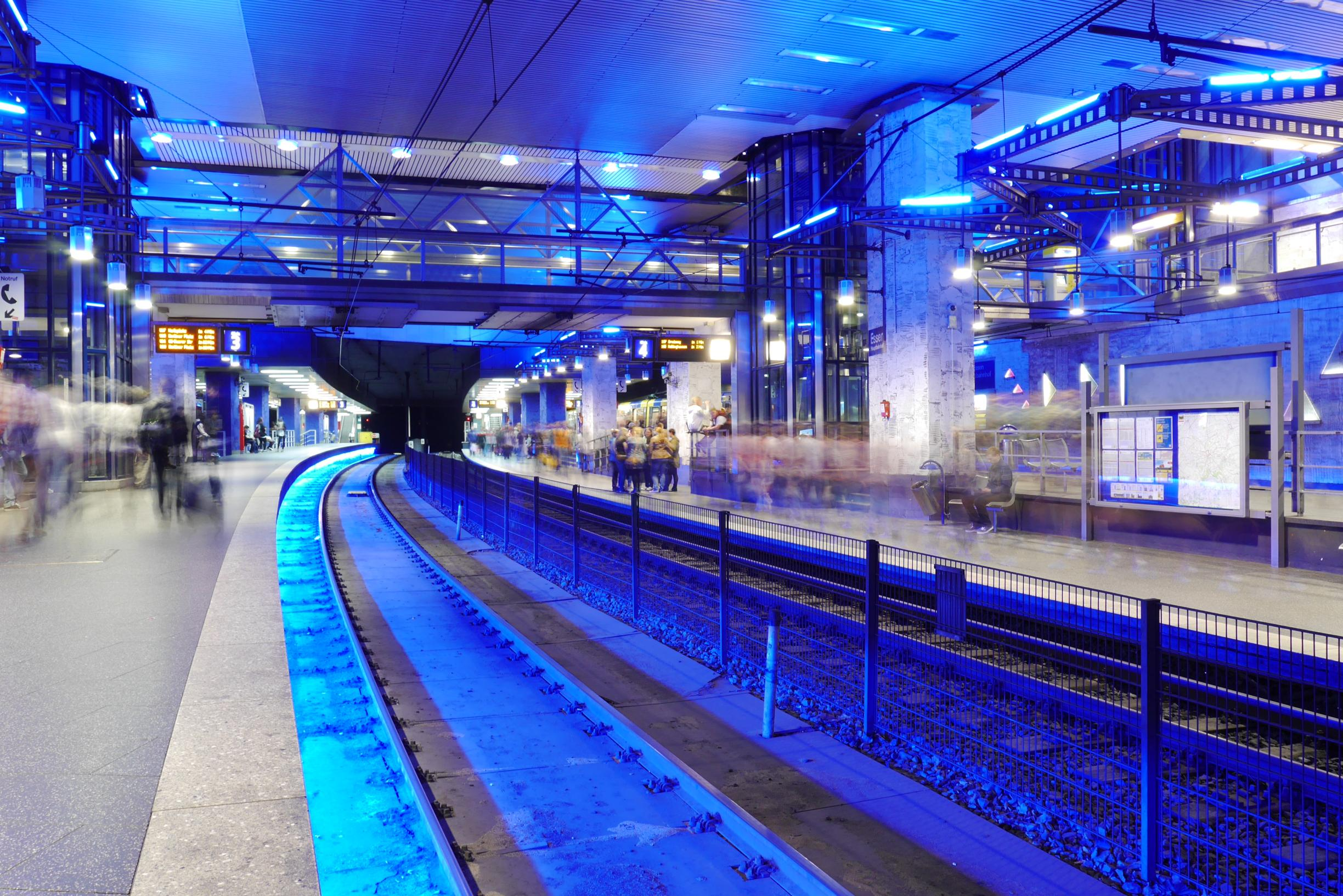
- Stadtbahn station at Essen Hauptbahnhof

Overview
- Locale: Essen, Gelsenkirchen & Mülheim an der Ruhr, NRW, Germany
- Transit type: Light rail (Stadtbahn)
- Number of lines: 3
- Number of stations: 45
- Website: Ruhrbahn and VRR

Operation
- Began operation: 28 May 1977
- Operator: Ruhrbahn / Verkehrsverbund Rhein-Ruhr (VRR)

Technical
- System length: 19.6 km (12.2 mi)
- Track gauge: 1,435 mm (4 ft 8 1/2 in) (standard gauge)
System map
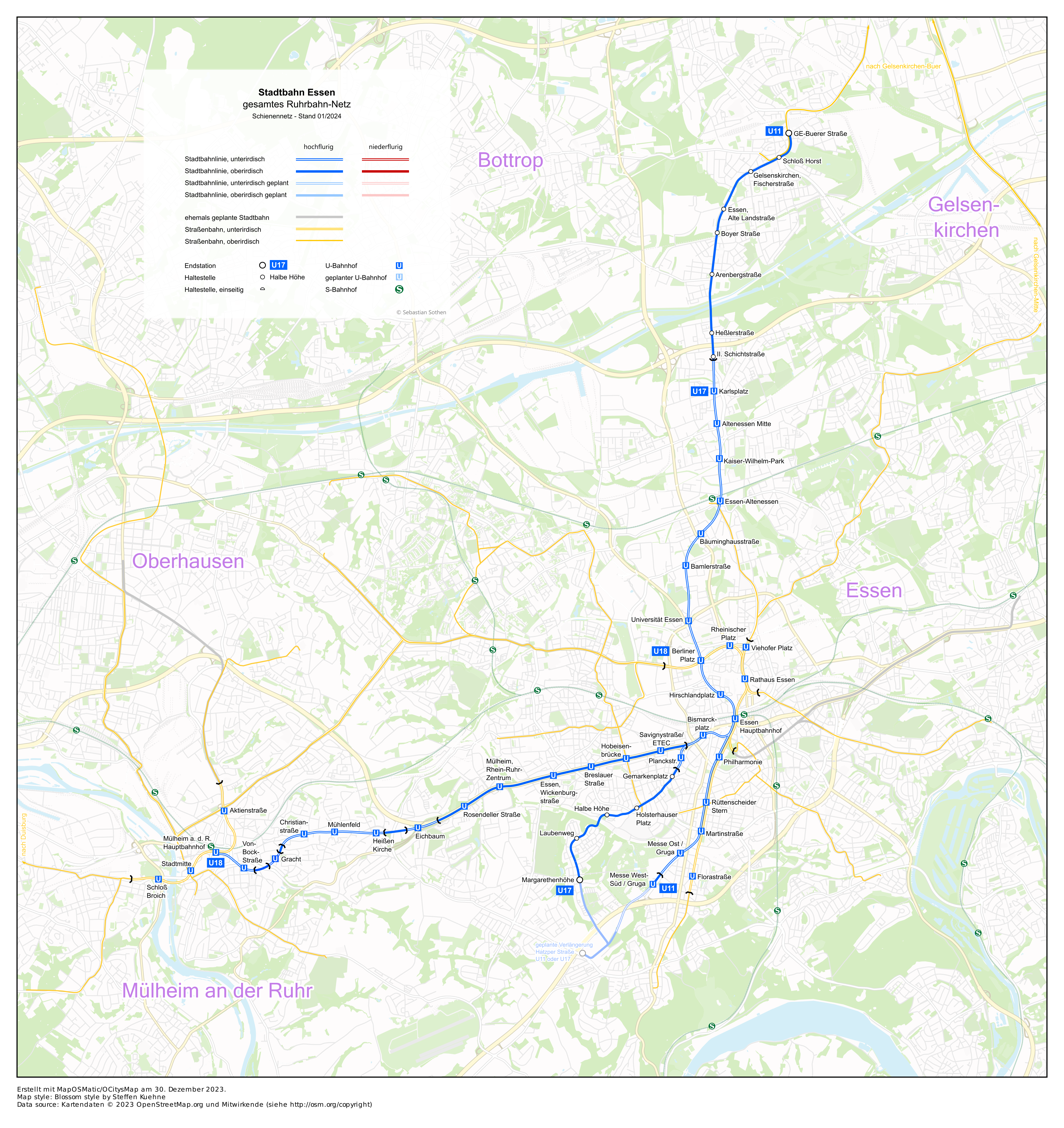
Essen Stadtbahn and tram network

The Essen Stadtbahn (German: Stadtbahn Essen) is a 19.6-kilometer (12.2 mi) light rail (Stadtbahn) network in Essen and the two neighbouring towns of Mülheim an der Ruhr and Gelsenkirchen in the German state of North Rhine Westphalia. It forms part of the Rhine-Ruhr Stadtbahn.

Like the Frankfurt U-Bahn, it is a mixed system of light rail and underground railway. One of its three lines, U18, runs completely free of intersections with other traffic. The other two lines are partly tramlines and partly underground lines. The sections of tramline have only a few sections that have no intersections with road traffic.

Like all urban public transport in Essen, the Essen Stadtbahn is operated by Ruhrbahn, a company owned by the Cities of Essen and Mülheim an der Ruhr. The transport companies of neighbouring municipalities are also involved with the operation of some lines under concessions.

== Operations ==
The Essen Stadtbahn includes three standard gauge lines: U11, U17 and U18. The Essen tram network also has seven "classic" tram lines, which run on metre gauge tracks, with around 52 kilometres (32 mi) of track. Both the metre and standard gauge lines run underground in the centre of Essen. While sections are built as Stadtbahn lines, partly in tunnel, and have stations with high platforms, there are also tram lines used only by low-floor trams serving stops with low platforms. An exception is the underground section of the southern route to Bredeney where the stations are served by a mixture of high-platform and low-platform rollingstock and therefore the stations have to be adapted for both types of vehicle.

The four-track station at Essen Hauptbahnhof is the most important point of intersection between the three Stadtbahn lines and four, sometimes five tram lines where it is possible to switch between Stadtbahn trains and trams on the same platform. For this purpose the two different levels of the platform are connected by ramps. The platforms are arranged so that it is possible to transfer across the platform between trains and trams running to the north and between trains and trams running to the south. A bridge spans the entire underground station that is accessible by lifts, providing an easy interchange and a barrier-free transfer for the disabled to trains running in opposite directions. Stadtbahn cars and trams share several other stations. Tram lines 101 and 107 run on the southern section of the Stadtbahn tunnel from Essen Hauptbahnhof to Martinstraße, using the high platforms of the Stadtbahn. Therefore, the high-floor tramcars use fold-up steps on these two lines. This line is equipped with dual gauge track with three rails to cater for the different track gauges.

All three Stadtbahn lines run to the same pattern: services on each line run during the peak hour at 10-minute intervals, in the evenings and on weekends or public holidays at 15-minute intervals and late in the evening at 30-minute intervals. During trade fairs, services on line U11 run on weekends at 10-minute intervals; between Messe (fair ground) and Berliner Platz they sometimes even run at 5-minute intervals. Operations end on all three lines at about 23:00.

== History ==
During the building of the first tramline in Essen in 1893, planning began on a partially underground railway, which was not realised until decades after the Second World War. The first preliminary line of the current Stadtbahn emerged in the early 1960s and were laid partly as tram tracks on the median strip of the Ruhrschnellweg ("Ruhr Expressway"), which is exactly where the modern line U18 runs. In this case, an underground Stadtbahn (U-Stadtbahn) was not initially planned. Construction work on the tram line in the Ruhr Expressway was carried out simultaneously with the upgrade of the Ruhr Expressway itself, since the latter up to that time had only three lanes and flat junctions and had insufficient capacity because of the large increase in traffic. Following the upgrade of other forms of public transport, the possibility of some form of public transport on the Ruhr Expressway were considered, including express buses on a separate bus lane. Ultimately, however, an option based around a rapid tramway gained favour. Thus a line was built on parts of today's Essen–Mülheim route, which was initially connected by temporary exit ramps with the rest of the tram network.

The plans for a tunnel under the centre of Essen replacing an above-ground tram line began in 1961. Again, there were considerations of relieving the above-ground tramway and congestion in the quite small Essen inner city (about 1,400 by 700 metres (4,600 ft × 2,300 ft)), which suffered from increasing traffic. The initial solutions ranged similarly from the retention of the surface tramway with the creation of a new centralised node, up to the creation of a pure U-Bahn (metro) system as in Berlin and Hamburg. For various reasons, however, it was agreed to build an underground tramway with the possibility of future upgrade to a full U-Bahn. The idea of building a pure U-Bahn system at once was considered, but discarded due to the need to handle the existing passenger flows linking the tramway systems of the neighbouring cities of the Ruhr.

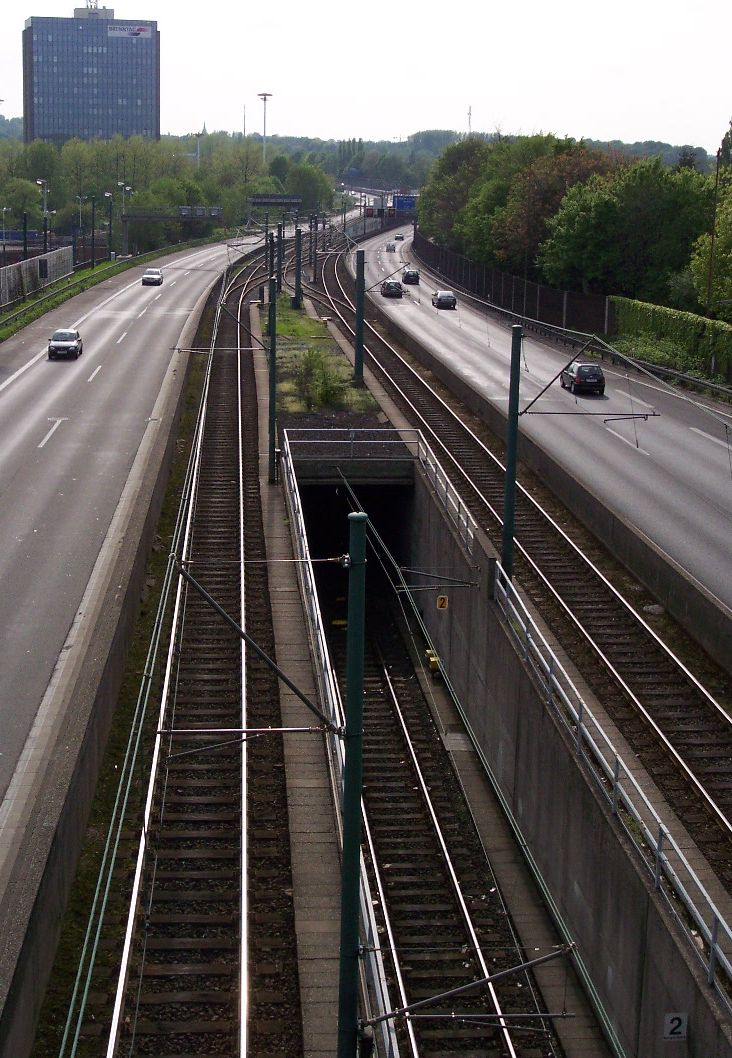
The tracks of the "model line" in the middle of the Ruhr motorway

Soon after that actual planning started on the tunnels in the city centre. The planning was carried out simultaneously on the construction of a highway tunnel for the Ruhr Expressway underneath the inner city. In the end, the so-called Y-Lösung ("Y solution") was adopted under which the Essen Hauptbahnhof Stadtbahn station became a central, four-track junction station serving all lines, which a branch in the north to the northeast and the northwest. The first construction project was the establishment of the shell of Planckstraße station in 1964, which was later used for the connection to the existing above-ground tram line to Margarethenhoehe. The first section of the underground tram line to go into operation, however, was a 552-metre (1,811 ft)-long urban tunnel section through Saalbau station, opened on 5 October 1967. This was also the first part of the entire underground tram (U-Straßenbahn) network of the Rhine-Ruhr region, since Saalbau station was also the first underground railway station in North Rhine-Westphalia.

The next phase of construction was the building of the continuous Stadtbahn line from Essen to Mülheim along the Ruhr Expressway, which, as has already been mentioned, was partly built in the 1960s. This route was considered a "model line" for the other Stadtbahn construction projects. On 28 May 1977, the opening of a nearly eight kilometre-long, continuous connection between Mülheim-Heißen and the Essen inner city took place, including the underground stations of Heißen Kirche in Mülheim city and the metro stations of Bismarckplatz, Essen Hauptbahnhof and Wiener Platz (now Hirschlandplatz) in Essen. This was the first Stadtbahn line of the network that was completely independent of the tram network to be opened. Porscheplatz (now called Rathaus Essen) Stadtbahn station was also put into operation on 28 May 1977; it was (and still is) operated by trams. The commissioning of the remaining five underground stations in Mülheim followed on 3 November 1979.

In 1981, the route of line U17 to Margarethenhoehe was put into operation. This included Planckstraße station, which had been built as a shell in the 1960s along with its associated ramp. The surface stations initially had low platforms located on the outside of the tracks, which were raised in 2002 and relocated onto islands between the tracks. At the same time, the two underground stations of Berliner Platz and Universität Essen (University) were opened; both are also stations on line U18 and Universität Essen is a station on line U17.

The next construction phase now included for the first time the construction of an underground section on the outskirts of Essen, namely the building of the so-called southern line (Südstrecke) from the existing Saalbau station towards Messe/Gruga and Bredeney. This line was equipped with dual gauge track with three rails for both Stadtbahn and tramway operations to Martinstraße station; south of that station the lines branch to form pairs of metre gauge and standard gauge track. This included four underground Stadtbahn stations for line U11 and, south of the junction, an underground tram station at Florastraße. Services started in 1986.

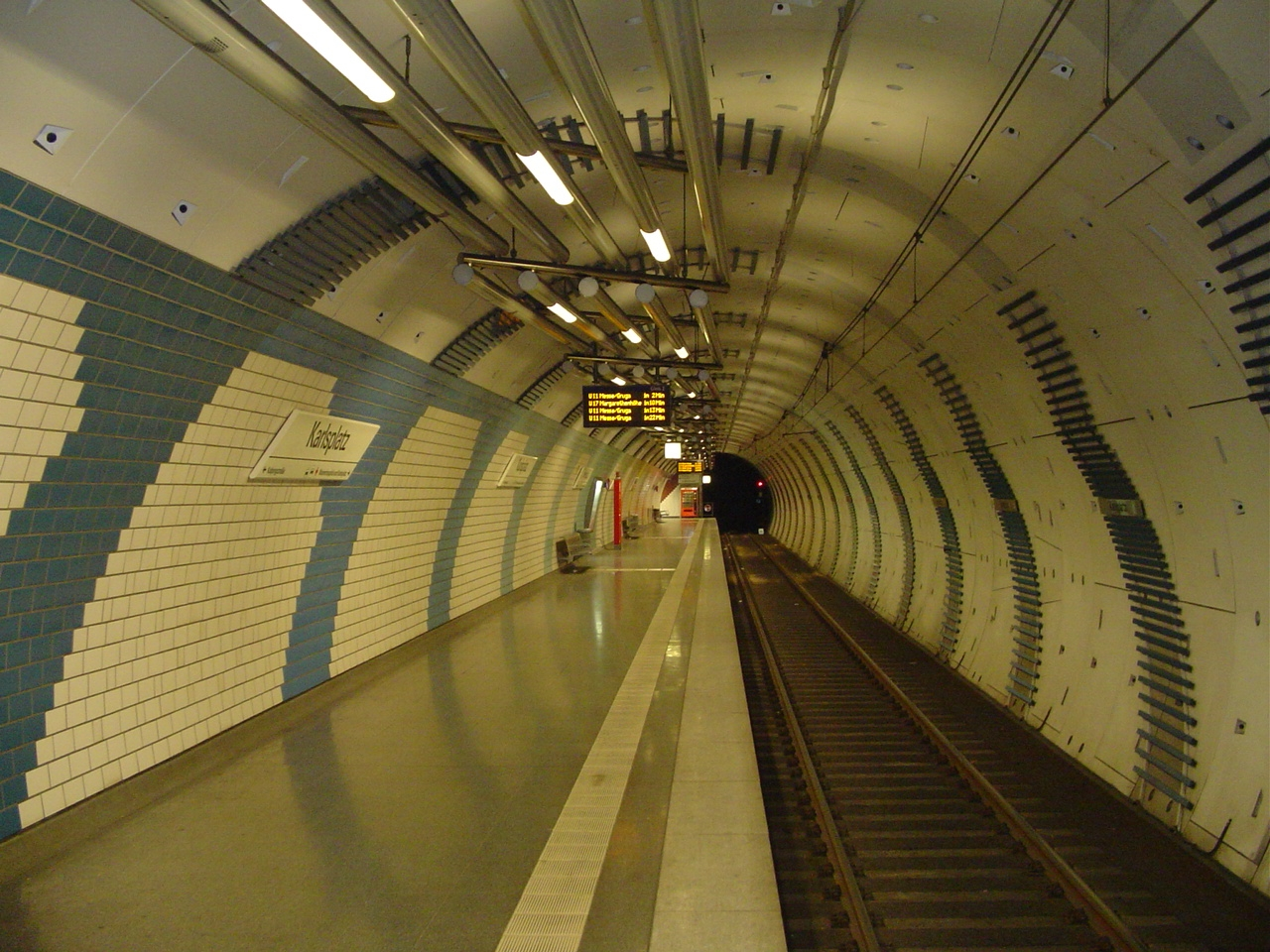
Karlsplatz station, built in 2001

The last major phase of construction to date was the northern extension, carried out in two stages. In 1998, the tunnel was finished from Universität Essen station to Altenessen station. Three years later, the section was opened to Karlsplatz and up the ramp to the surface station of II. Schichtstraße. U11 services ended at Karlsplatz, while U17 services continue to Gelsenkirchen, the above ground section north of Karlsplatz was upgraded up to 2001 on the route on an earlier metre-gauge tram line for standard gauge Stadtbahn operations. The Gelsenkirchen section of line U17 ended from 2001 to 2004 at Fischerstraße. Two extra stations in Gelsenkirchen, Schloss Horst and Buerer Straße, were taken into operation in 2004. From January 2010, line U11 operated to Gelsenkirchen Buerer Straße, replacing line U17, which now ran only as far as Berliner Platz. Line U18 was called a "shopping line" and continued to Karlsplatz station. Since September 2011, line U11 continues to Gelsenkirchen Buerer Straße and line U17 has replaced line U18 to Karlsplatz. Line U18 has run since September 2011 between Mülheim Hauptbahnhof and Berliner Platz in Essen.

== Lines and stations ==
The 19.6-kilometer (12.2 mi) Essen Stadtbahn system includes a 9.8-kilometer (6.1 mi) underground trunk line through the centre of Essen and four outer branches, each of which is served by one or two Stadtbahn services. The Stadtbahn serves 45 stations. The main line is the section between Essen Hauptbahnhof and Berliner Platz, which is served by all three Stadtbahn lines. The northern section between Berliner Platz and Karlsplatz is served by lines U11 and U17. The line between the Essen Hauptbahnhof and Bismarckplatz station is served by lines U17 and U18, while the other lines are served by only one service.

=== The lines in detail ===
Messe Ost / Gruga station on the U11

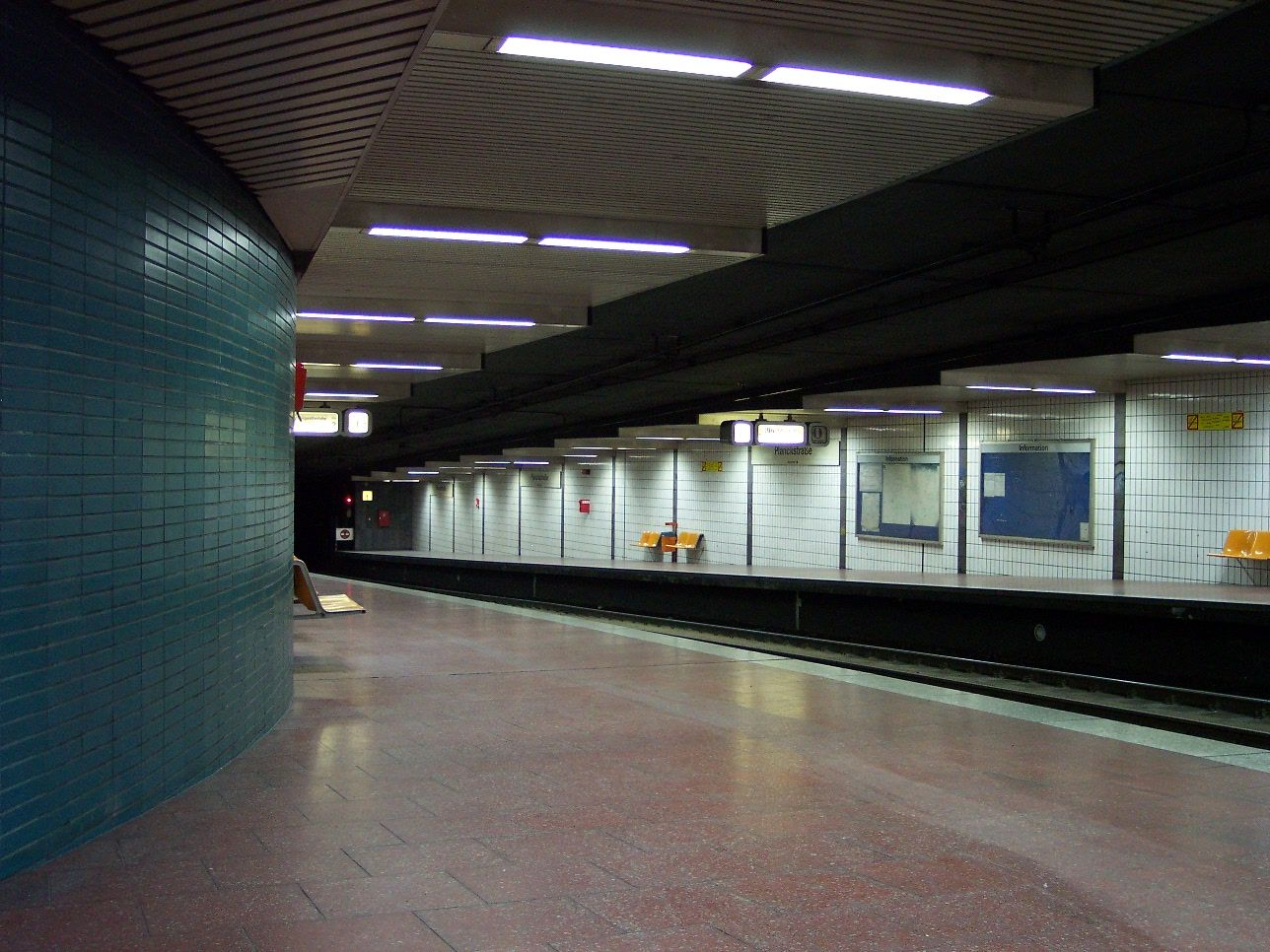
Planckstraße station on the U17 an der südlichen Auffahrrampe

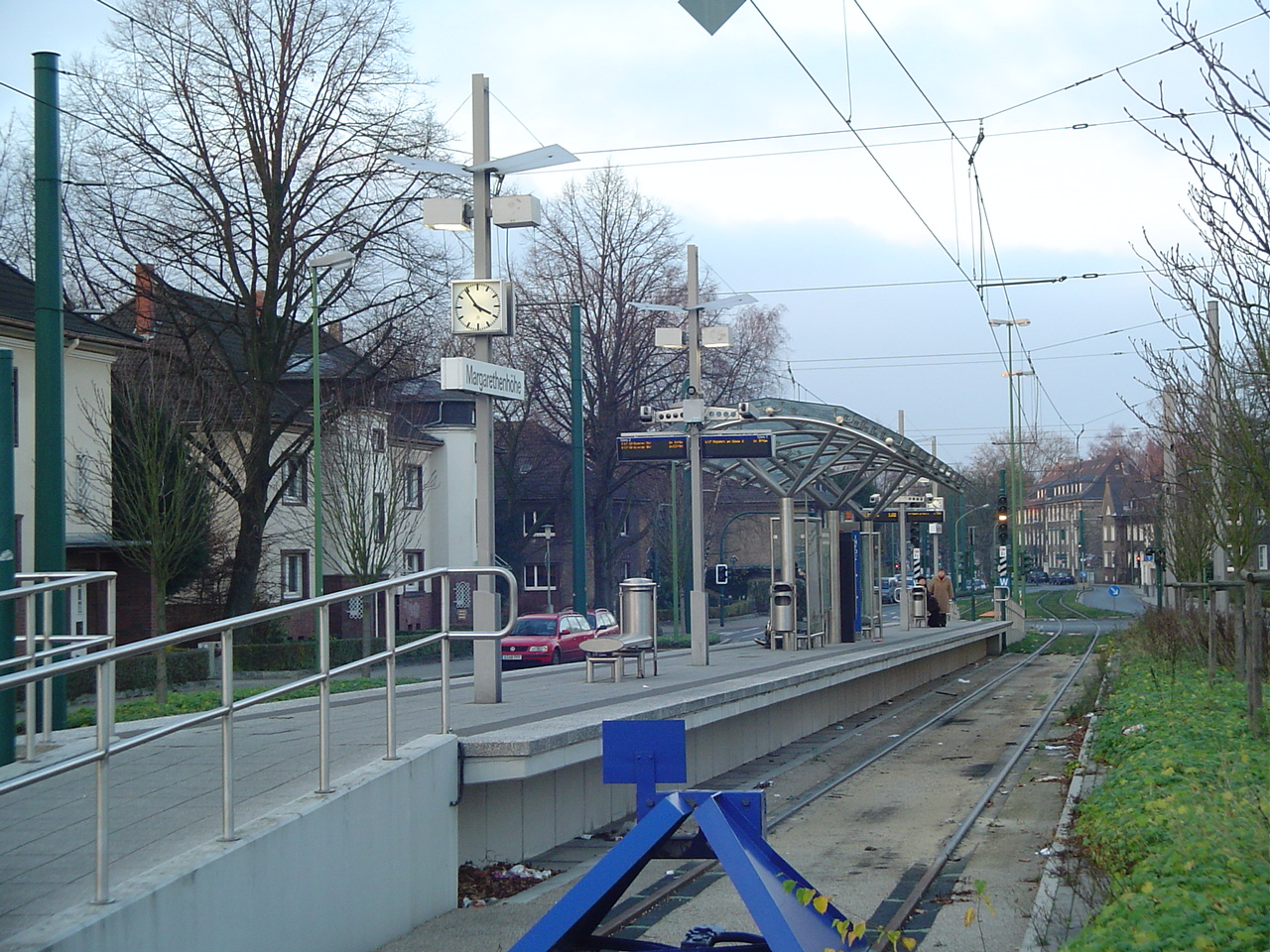
Margarethenhöhe station at the end of the U17

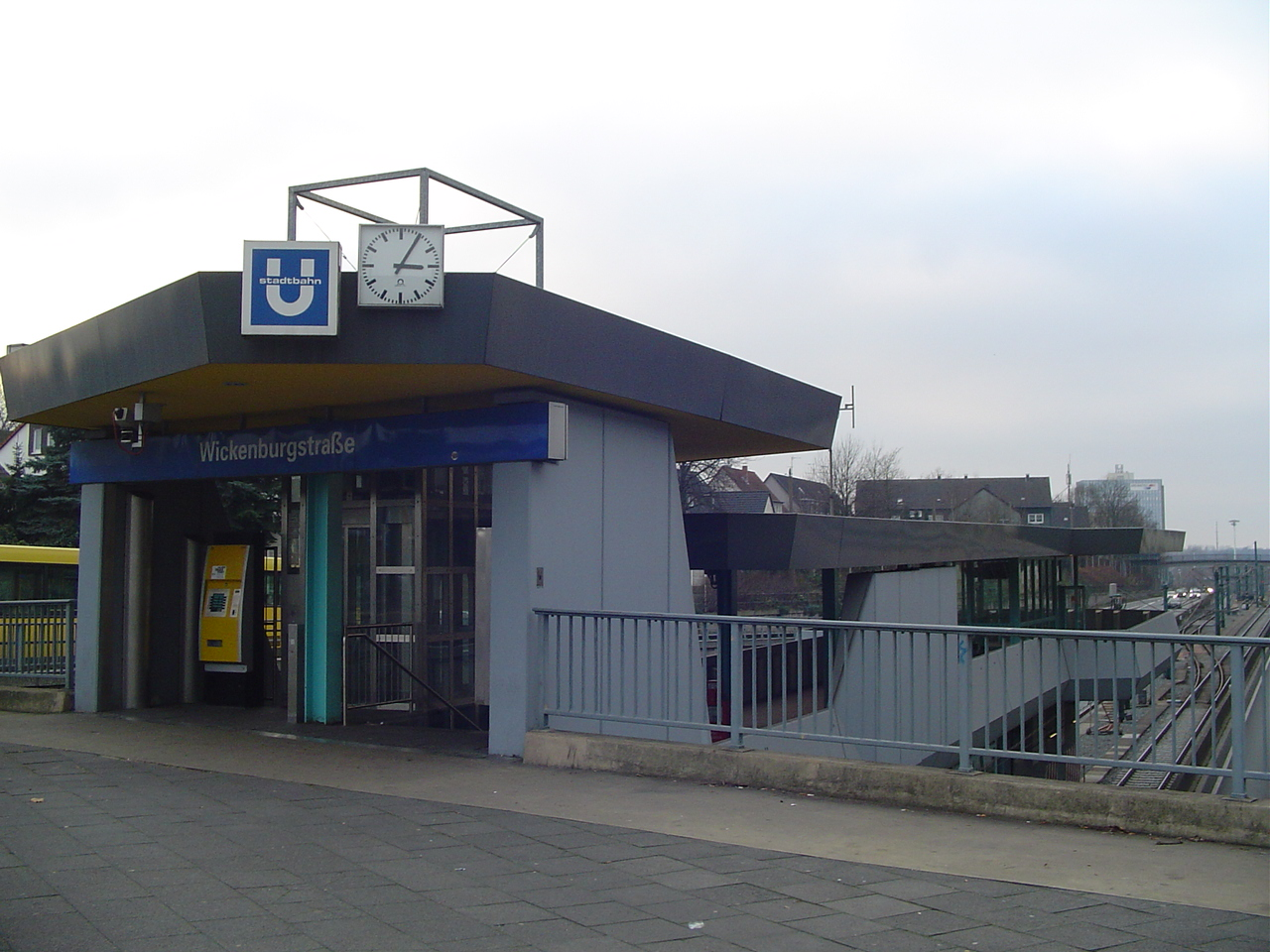
Entrance to Wickenburgstraße station on the U18

Line	Route	Stations (underground stations)
	GE-Buerer Str. – E-Karnap – Altenessen – Essen Hbf – Rüttenscheid – Messe	23 (14)
	Karlsplatz – Berliner Platz – Essen Hbf – Holsterhausen – Margarethenhöhe	17 (12)
	Berliner Platz – Essen Hbf – MH-Rhein-Ruhr-Zentrum – Mülheim Hbf	17 (10)

The numbering of the line follows the VRR's system for Stadtbahn lines, which is composed as follows: the preceding "U" indicates that it is a Stadtbahn line that is largely or completely separated from traffic and that it is not a tram or bus line. This is followed by a number that represents the area of the transport lines, in Essen and Mülheim this is 1. The second digit is the local line number, which in Essen is not assigned in consecutive order, but instead reflects the number of the tram line that it replaced or which ran nearby.

==== U11: GE-Horst Buerer Str.–E-Messe West-Süd / Gruga ====
The route of line U11 since the timetable change in January 2010 is no longer fully separated from other traffic. It runs completely underground from the ramp from II Schichtstr. to Messe Ost / Gruga, except that the southern terminus at Messe Süd / Gruga is in a cutting. Line U11 is an important fast connection between the northern district of Altenessen and the exhibition ground (Messe) and Gruga Park in the southern suburbs. This line passes under through the city centre with the two interchanges to tram lines at Berliner Platz and Essen Hauptbahnhof. Line U11 serves a total of 23 stations.

==== U17: Karlsplatz–Margarethenhöhe ====
Line U17 is the shortest of the three Stadtbahn lines and has 17 stations. It runs from Karlsplatz station in Altenessen to Margarethenhöhe, a garden suburb in the south of Essen. The section from Karlsplatz to the Planckstraße ramp, including all the intermediate stations, is underground, while the rest of the line is above ground and, in contrast to line U18, has several at-grade intersections. In the southern region near the terminus of Margarethenhöhe, parts of the line are single track. In 2002, the last above-ground stations on line U17 were equipped with high platforms that are accessible for the disabled, making entries and exits on the entire Essen Stadtbahn system fully accessible.

==== U18: Berliner Platz–Mülheim Hbf ====
Line U18 has had 17 stations, since the timetable change in September 2011 and is the only completely grade-separated line of the Essen Stadtbahn. It links Essen city in the east with Mulheim an der Ruhr in the West, with nine stations in Mülheim. This includes the four-track terminus of Mülheim (Ruhr) Hauptbahnhof, which connects to the trams towards Duisburg, among other things. Line U18 is built to full rapid transit standard, but large parts of the line run above ground. The section between Heißen Kirche and Bismarckplatz is largely built between the carriageways of the Ruhr Expressway and there are small elevated sections in Mülheim. Line U18 was called a "shopping line" from 7 January 2010 to September 2011 because it had stations near the shopping areas of the Allee-Center Altenessen, Limbecker Platz, the Rhein-Ruhr-Zentrum in the Essen inner city and the Forum Mülheim.

==== Line network before the timetable change of 2010 ====
Before the change of timetable at the beginning of 2010, the lines ran as follows:

- U11: Karlsplatz–Essen-Altenessen–Universität–Berliner Platz–Essen Hbf–Rüttenscheid–Messe/Gruga
- U17: Gelsenkirchen-Horst–Essen-Altenessen–Universität–Berliner Platz–Essen Hbf–Holsterhausen–Margarethenhöhe
- U18: Berliner Platz–Essen Hbf–Rhein-Ruhr-Zentrum–Mülheim Hbf

==== Line network after January 2010 ====
With the timetable change on 7 January 2010, the rail network was reorganised. The lines operated as follows:

- U11: Gelsenkirchen-Horst–Essen-Altenessen–Universität–Berliner Platz–Essen Hbf–Rüttenscheid–Messe/Gruga
- U17: Berliner Platz–Essen Hbf–Holsterhausen–Margarethenhöhe
- U18: Karlsplatz–Essen-Altenessen–Universität–Berliner Platz–Essen Hbf–Rhein-Ruhr-Zentrum–Mülheim Hbf

With this change, line U11 lost its character as a line built fully to rapid transit standards. Only line U18 retains this, but the link to the fairgrounds (Messe) for the residents of the northern suburbs of Essen and the city of Gelsenkirchen has been significantly improved. The residents of Altenessen have gained a direct connection to Mülheim and the Rhein-Ruhr-Zentrum. With the new route of line U18, the large shopping centres of Essen and Mülheim were directly connected to each other (the Allee-Center Altenessen, Limbecker Platz, Essen inner city, the Rhein-Ruhr-Zentrum and the Forum Mülheim). The operation of the particularly well-used section from Essen Hbf to the University continues to run at 5-minute intervals.

The operation of coupled sets on line U17 during peak hour only is being considered. According to the EVAG the operation of triple sets on the Karlsplatz–Messe/Gruga route would be possible.

==== Line network since September 2011 ====
In September 2011, U17 services were extended from Berliner Platz to Karlsplatz and U18 was cut back on the same section of line:

- U11: Gelsenkirchen-Horst–Essen-Altenessen–Universität–Berliner Platz–Essen Hbf–Rüttenscheid–Messe/Gruga
- U17 Karlsplatz–Essen-Altenessen–Universität–Berliner Platz–Essen Hbf–Holsterhausen–Margarethenhöhe
- U18: Berliner Platz–Essen Hbf–Rhein-Ruhr-Zentrum–Mülheim Hbf

=== List of all stations ===
Northern branch
Station	Position	Line	Image	Connections	Opening date
Gelsenkirchen Buerer Straße	above ground	U11		301 SB36 252 253 258 259 260 383	13 June 2004
Gelsenkirchen Schloss Horst	above ground	U11		301 SB36 252 253 258 259 260 383 396	13 June 2004
Gelsenkirchen Fischerstraße	above ground	U11		396	30 September 2001
Alte Landstraße	above ground	U11			30 September 2001
Boyer Straße	above ground	U11		189 263	30 September 2001
Arenbergstraße	above ground	U11		189 263	30 September 2001
Heßlerstraße	above ground	U11			30 September 2001
II. Schichtstraße	above ground	U11			30 September 2001
Karlsplatz	under ground	U11, U17		162 172 173 183	30 September 2001
Altenessen Mitte	under ground	U11, U17		162 170 172	30 September 2001
Kaiser-Wilhelm-Park	under ground	U11, U17		162 172	30 September 2001
Altenessen Bahnhof	under ground	U11, U17		RB32, RB35, RE3 108 140 162 172 183	24 May 1998
Bäuminghausstraße	under ground	U11, U17			24 May 1998
Bamlerstraße	under ground	U11, U17		196	24 May 1998
Universität Essen	under ground	U11, U17		SB16 166	27 November 1981
Trunk line
Station	Position	Line	Image	Connections	Opening date
Berliner Platz	under ground	U11, U17, U18		101/106 103 105 109 145 166 SB16	27 November 1981
Hirschlandplatz (formerly Wiener Platz)	under ground	U11, U17, U18			28 May 1977
Essen Hauptbahnhof	under ground	U11, U17, U18		S1, S2, S3, S6, S9, RE1, RE2, RE6, RE11, RE14, RE16, RE42, RE49, RB33, RB40; 101/106 105 107 108 145 146 154 155 166 196 SB15 SB16	28 May 1977
Southern branch (Essen Hbf – Messe/Bredeney)
Station	Position	Line	Image	Connections	Opening date
Philharmonie	under ground	U11		107 108	5 October 1967
Rüttenscheider Stern	under ground	U11		101/106 107 108	1 June 1986
Martinstraße	under ground	U11		107 108 142 160 161	1 June 1986
Messe Ost/Gruga	under ground	U11		142	1 June 1986
Messe West-Süd/Gruga	above ground	U11		142	1 June 1986
Essen-Mülheim line
Station	Position	Line	Image	Connections	Opening date
Bismarckplatz	under ground	U17, U18		196	28 May 1977
Savignystraße / ETEC	above ground	U18			28 May 1977
Hobeisenbrücke	above ground	U18		101/106	28 May 1977
Breslauer Straße	above ground	U18		160 161	28 May 1977
Wickenburgstraße	above ground	U18		145 196	28 May 1977
RheinRuhrZentrum	above ground	U18		129 130 138	28 May 1977
Rosendeller Straße	above ground	U18			28 May 1977
Eichbaum	above ground	U18		136	28 May 1977
Heißen Kirche	under ground	U18		129 136 138	28 May 1977
Mühlenfeld	under ground	U18			3 November 1979
Christianstraße	under ground	U18			3 November 1979
Gracht	under ground	U18			3 November 1979
Von-Bock-Straße	under ground	U18		131	3 November 1979
Mülheim (Ruhr) Hauptbahnhof	under ground	U18		S1, S3, RE1, RE2, RE6, RE11; 102 901 122 124 128 131 133 135 151 752 753	3 November 1979
Branch to Margarethenhöhe
Station	Position	Line	Image	Connections	Opening date
Planckstraße	under ground	U17			27 November 1981
Gemarkenplatz	above ground	U17			27 November 1981
Holsterhauser Platz	above ground	U17		101/106	27 November 1981
Halbe Höhe	above ground	U17			27 November 1981
Laubenweg	above ground	U17			27 November 1981
Margarethenhöhe	above ground	U17		169	27 November 1981

== Rolling stock ==
Two different types of electric multiple units are currently used on the three Essen Stadtbahn lines. Both types are operated as single units and in two-car trains.

=== 5000/5100 series: Stadtbahnwagen B ===
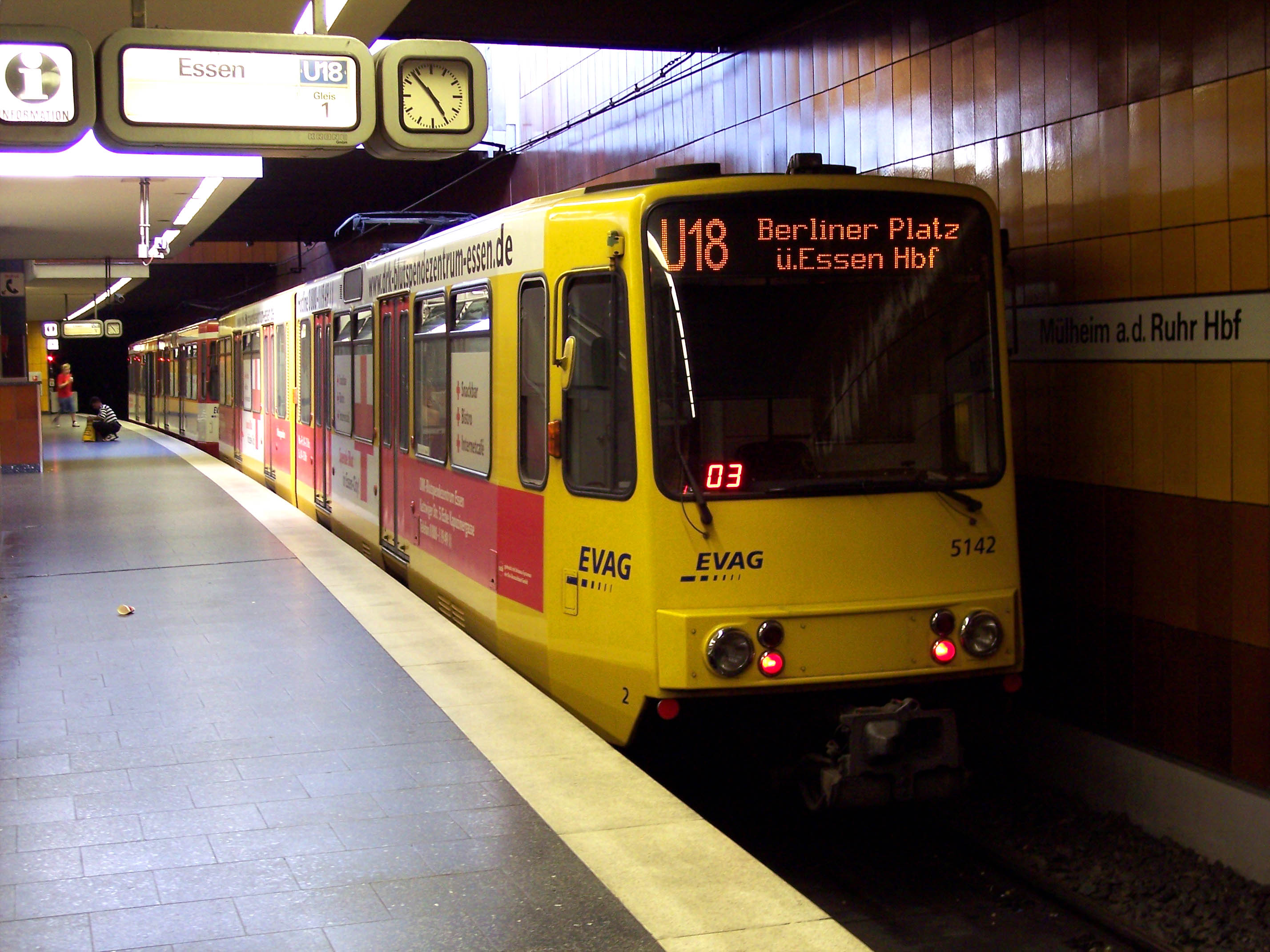
B-car in Mülheimer Hbf

The system's original Stadtbahnwagen Typ B ("B-Wagen") vehicles were produced by a consortium of Duewag, Siemens, and Kiepe between 1976 and 1985, and are still used today on all three lines. Of the system's 31 B-Wagens, twenty-four (5101–5111, 5121–5128, 5141–5145) were owned by EVAG, while the other seven (5012–5016, 5031–5032) were owned by MVG, prior to the agencies' 2017 merger.

Originally, these cars were equipped with fold-up steps that allow entries and exits at stops without platforms or with low platforms. However, since all stations have now been equipped with uniformly high platforms, these steps are being removed in the course of the current rolling stock upgrades (which includes the incorporation of surveillance cameras in the carriages, new paintwork, new dot-matrix displays inside and LED advertising outside).

=== 5200 series: ex-DLR P86/P89 light rail vehicles ===
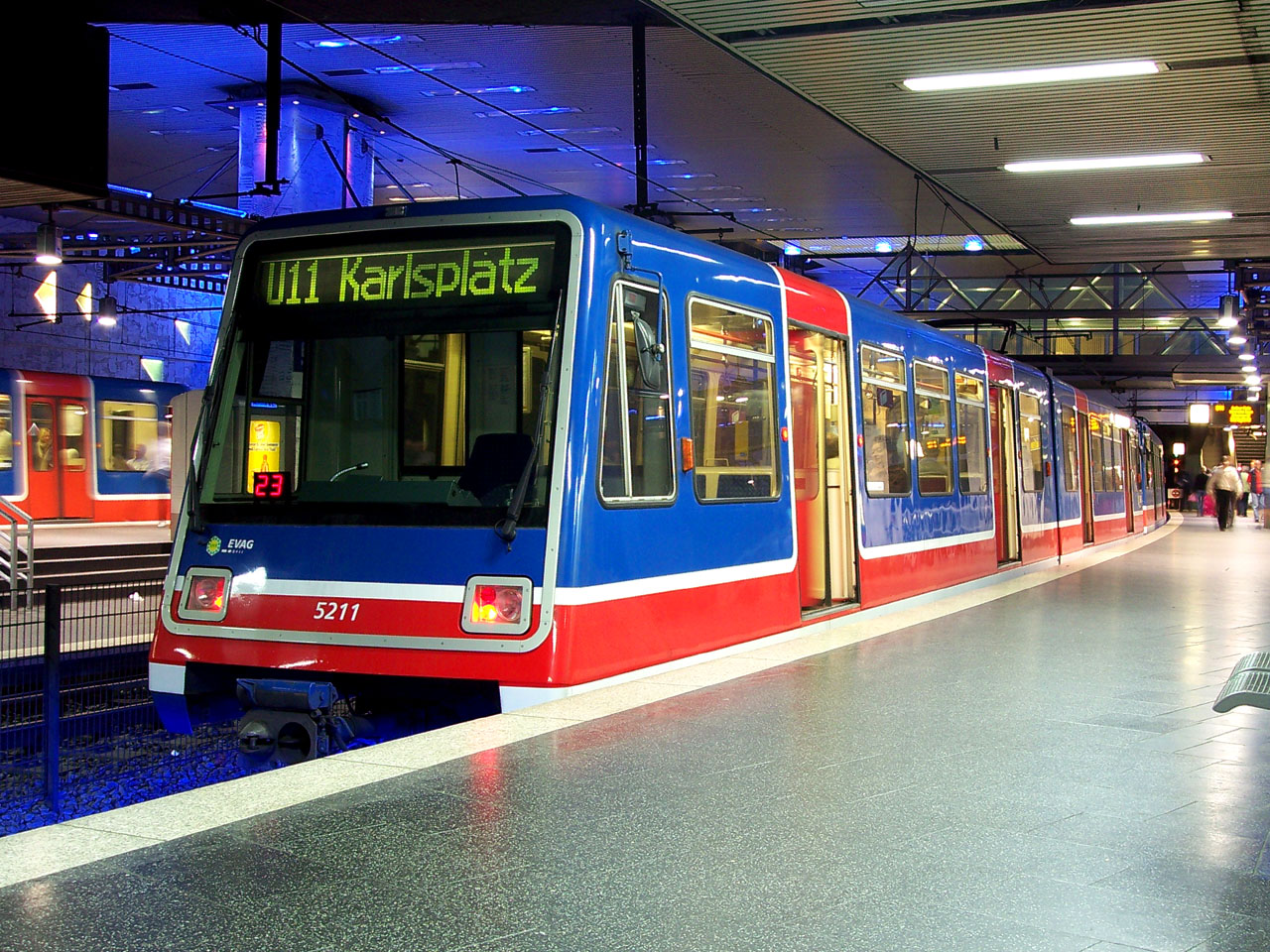
P86 car in Docklands Light Railway colours

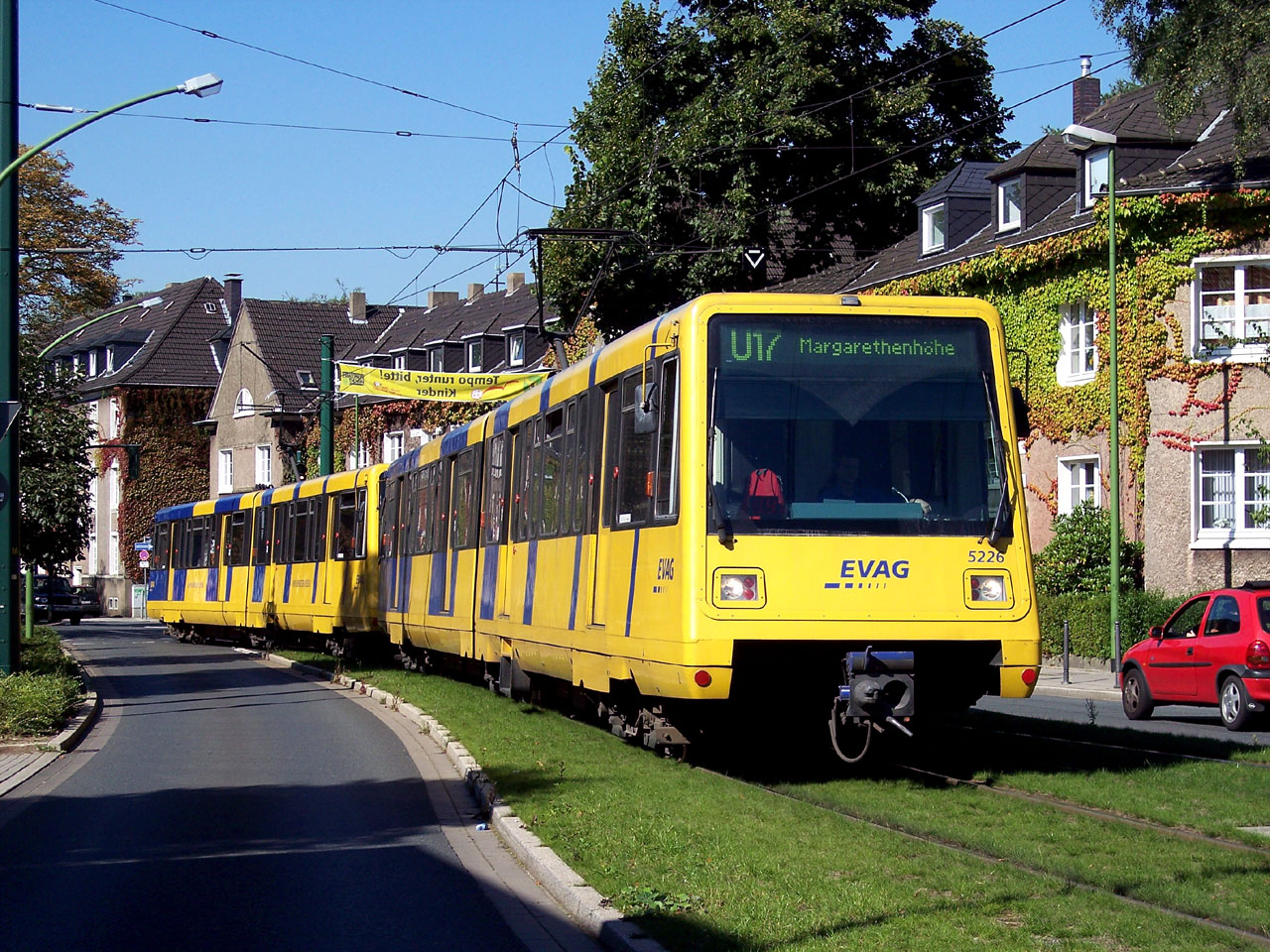
P89 car

Class P86 (5231–5240) and P89 (5221–5230) light rail vehicles were purchased second-hand from London's Docklands Light Railway (DLR) from 1991. The class P86 (P for Poplar DLR depot, 86 for the year) vehicles were originally built by Linke-Hofmann-Busch for the DLR's opening in 1986. However, since they did not meet British safety standards for use in tunnels, the DLR could not use these vehicles on the DLR's extension to Bank, which was opened in 1991. Therefore, DLR sold its 11 P86 vehicles, which at that time were only a few years old, to EVAG, which at the time needed more vehicles for its planned route extensions. In 1989, DLR procured ten P89 vehicles from British Rail Engineering Limited for route extensions. These cars were very similar to the P86 vehicles, but could be operated to Bank. Due to strong traffic growth and other route extensions, DLR procured new, more modern vehicles that could be used in trains of up to three sets. The installation of DLR's new Alcatel SelTrac train control system would have meant that the P89 sets would have had to be rebuilt in order to maintain them in operation. They also could not be operated in coupled sets in the DLR's tunnel sections due to their lack of connecting doors. As a result, after only a few years of operation in London, the P89 sets were also sold to EVAG.

All the acquired DLR vehicles were converted by EVAG for their use in Essen. Among other things, driving cabs and rooftop pantographs had to be retrofitted, as these cars had been driven automatically in London and used bottom contact third rail while the Essen Stadtbahn uses overhead electrification. The braking system also had to be modified for street running.

Initially the P86 sets were otherwise largely unchanged from their use in London, while the P89 sets were given an overhaul with new motors and braking to allow for street running. The P86 sets then got this overhaul from 2005 to 2012, which also included the replacement of the dual-leaf inward folding doors being replaced with single-lead pocket doors that the P89s got while operating in London, in order to extend their service on the Essen Stadtbahn network, with the converted sets classified as P86U. In this case, the red and blue paint of the DLR was replaced by the yellow and blue EVAG colour scheme, which was used by the P89 sets since their first day of operation in Essen.

=== Future vehicles ===
In June 2021, Ruhrbahn ordered 51 LRVs from Spanish train manufacturer Construcciones y Auxiliar de Ferrocarriles to replace the entire current Stadtbahn fleet. The first of these arrived in 2024.

== Expansion plans ==
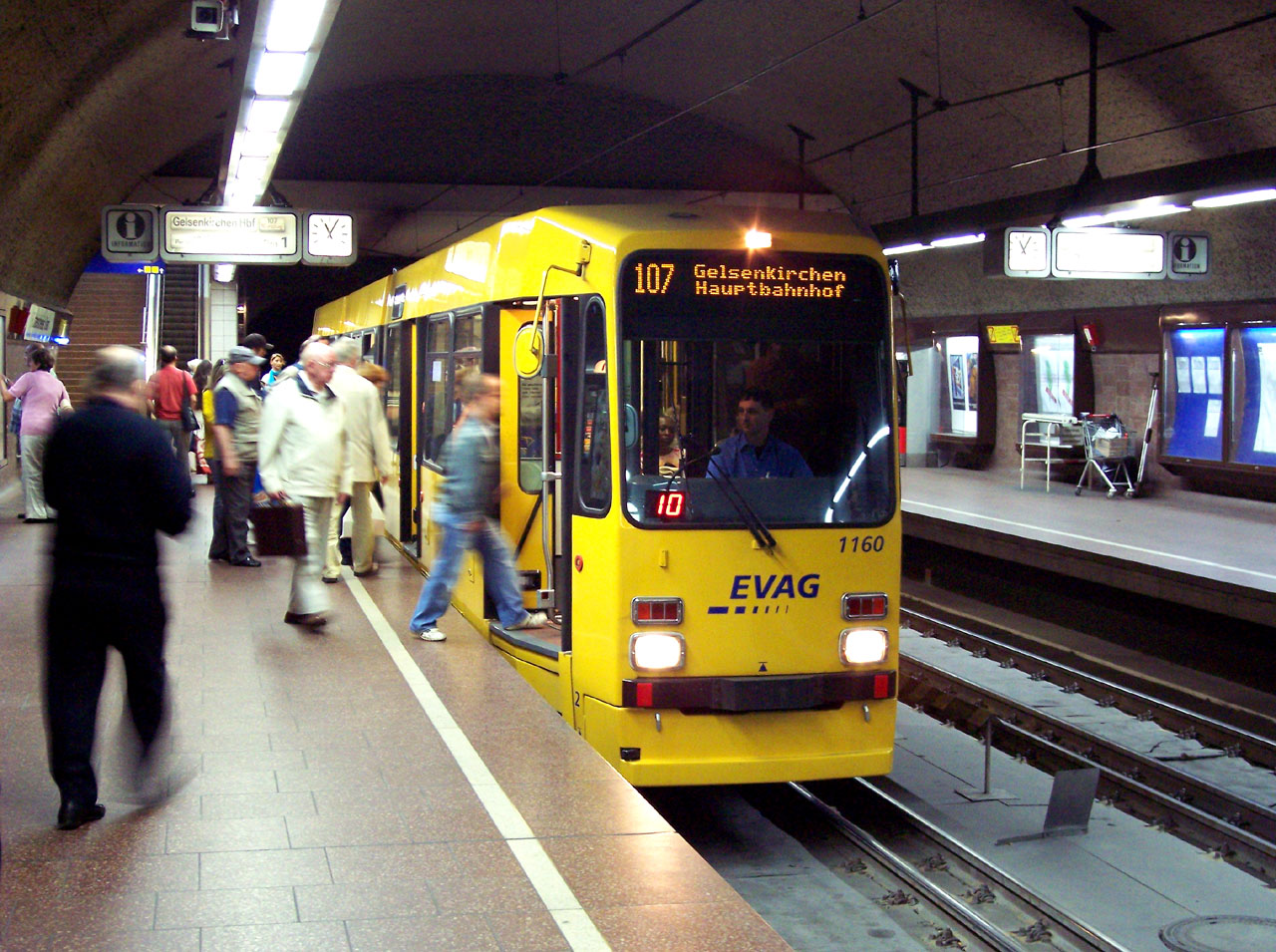
Tram with undeployed folding steps for boarding and alighting at Rüttenscheider Stern

One project is the above-ground extension of line U17 from the current terminus of Margarethenhöhe to the south through three stations. An alternative extension of line U11 to the south has also been examined.

In addition, there are plans to replace the old high-floor tram cars with their folding steps which are used on lines 101 and 107, which share the line with U11 from Essen Hauptbahnhof to Martinstraße. It was proposed to upgrade the southern section to Bredeney to standard gauge as Stadtbahn line U12, but this was eventually rejected by the city of Essen. The current plans envisage the partial lowering of the platforms in the southern tunnel. This would allow the tram on lines 101 and 107 to continue to operate to Bredeney and the future operation of low-floor trams. The high-floor platforms would be slightly elevated and thus would provide stepless entries and exits for line U11 services. However, the operation of three-car sets to the Messe on line U11 through these stations would no longer be possible. A change to low-floor trams on line 107 would be possible in the medium term and the purchase of new of low-floor vehicles is planned from 2012.

== Underground stations in pre-metro mode ==
East-West link
Station	Tramline	Pictures	Connections	Opening date
Berliner Platz (underground)^{1}	101, 103, 105, 109		U11, U17, U18; bus SB16, 145, 147, 166	28 September 1991
Rheinischer Platz	101, 103, 105, 109		Bus 145, 147, 196	28 September 1991
Schützenbahn – Innenstadt
Station	Tramline	Pictures	Connections	Opening date
Viehofer Platz	106, 107		Bus 145, 147, 154, 155, 196	27 September 1985
Rathaus Essen (formerly Porscheplatz)	101, 103, 105, 106, 107, 109		Bus SB16, 145, 147, 154, 155, 166, 196	28 May 1977
Essen Hbf^{3}	101, 103, 105, 106, 107		S1, S2, S3, S6, S9, RE1, RE2, RE6, RE11, RE14, RE16, RB40, RB42; U11, U17, U18; Bus SB15, SB16, SB19, 145, 146, 154, 155, 166, 196	28 May 1977
Southern line
Station	Tramline	Pictures	Connections	Opening date
Philharmonie/Saalbau^{2}	101, 107		U11	5 October 1967
Rüttenscheider Stern^{2}	101, 107		U11, 106	1 June 1986
Martinstraße^{2}	101, 107		U11; Bus 142, 160, 161	1 June 1986
Florastraße	101, 107			1 June 1986

^{1} Interchange station: U-Stadtbahn above, tram under
^{2} Shared by U-Stadtbahn and trams at same platform
^{3} Shared by U-Stadtbahn and trams at different platforms

As part of the planning for the Stadtbahn in the 1970s other tunnels would have been built, including an underground east–west connection, that would have involved existing tram routes. The project as a whole consisted of about 30 kilometres of tunnels, the complete re-gauging of all lines to standard gauge and the elimination of all tram lines that were not covered by these plans. The plan was targeted for completion in 2008. Up to this point, the stations that had already been built in the city centre and in Ruettenscheid would still be operated by trams in pre-metro mode (Stadtbahn-Vorlaufbetrieb). However, these plans were found to be too financially ambitious and could not be pursued. The construction of underground railway in Essen officially ended with the inauguration of the northern line in 2001. The stations built and used by trams in pre-metro mode remain, with all their shortcomings.

== Tickets and fares ==
The fares of the Verkehrsverbund Rhein-Ruhr (Rhine-Ruhr transport association, VRR) apply to journeys on the Essen Stadtbahn, as well as on the trams and other public transport in the city.

== See also ==
- Trams in Essen
- Rhine-Ruhr Stadtbahn
- Verkehrsverbund Rhein-Ruhr
