= Essen-Altenessen station =

Railway station in Essen, Germany

Essen Altenessen
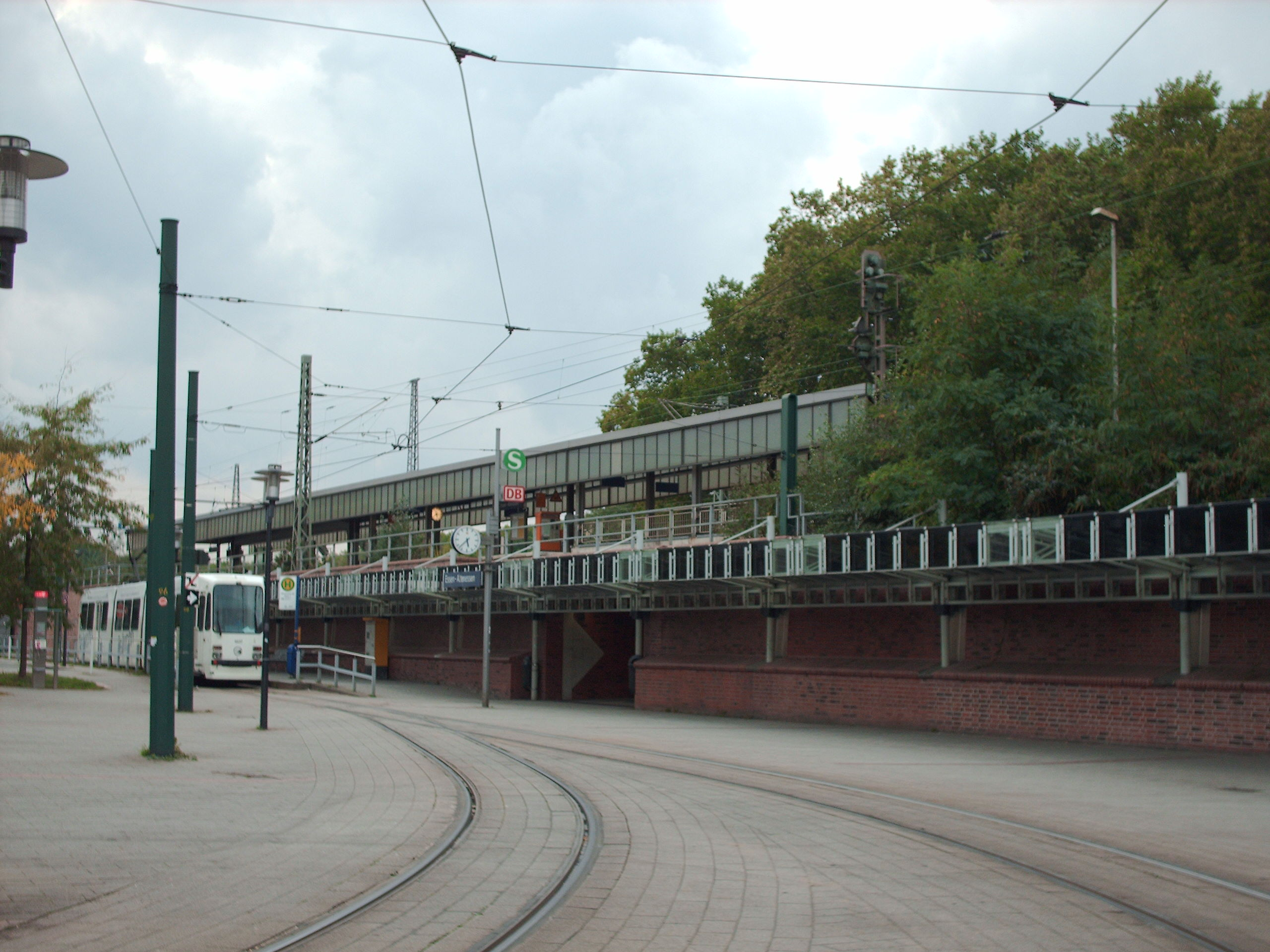
- Tram (left) and elevated S-Bahn tracks (right) in 2006

General information
- Location: Hövelstraße 8, Essen, NRW; Germany
- Coordinates: 51°29′3″N 7°0′27″E
- Owner: Deutsche Bahn
- Operator: DB Netz; DB Station&Service
- Lines: Duisburg–Dortmund (KBS 416)
- Platforms: 2
- Train operators: DB Regio NRW eurobahn

Construction
- Accessible: Yes

Other information
- Station code: 1694
- DS100 code: EEAL
- IBNR: 8001900
- Category: 5
- Fare zone: VRR: 354
- Website: www.bahnhof.de

History
- Opened: 1847

Services
Preceding station		Following station
Oberhausen Hbf towards Düsseldorf Hbf	RE 3	Gelsenkirchen Hbf towards Hamm (Westf) Hbf
Preceding station	DB Regio NRW	Following station
Essen-Bergeborbeck towards Duisburg Hbf	RB 32	Essen Zollverein Nord towards Dortmund Hbf
Preceding station	VIAS	Following station
Essen-Bergeborbeck towards Mönchengladbach Hbf	RB 35	Essen Zollverein Nord towards Gelsenkirchen Hbf
Preceding station	Rhine-Ruhr Stadtbahn	Following station
Bäuminghausstraße towards Messe West-Süd Gruga	U11	Kaiser-Wilhelm-Park towards Buerer Straße
Bäuminghausstraße towards Margarethenhöhe	U17	Kaiser-Wilhelm-Park towards Karlsplatz
Location

Essen-Altenessen (Bahnhof Essen-Altenessen—"Old Essen") is a railway station situated in Essen in western Germany. It is served by Regional-Express service RE3 (Rhein-Emscher-Express), Regionalbahn lines RB32 (Rhein-Emscher-Bahn) and RB35 (Emscher-Niederrhein-Bahn) and lines U11 and U17 of the Essen Stadtbahn.

== History ==
The station was opened on 15 May 1847 on the trunk line of the former Cologne-Minden Railway Company (Cöln-Mindener Eisenbahn-Gesellschaft, CME). under the name of Essen CM. It and Essen-Bergeborbeck are the oldest stations in modern Essen.

A railway association was founded in 1841 by the community of Essen to persuade the Cologne-Minden Railway Company to move its proposed route further south to run through Essen. Even the offer of a subsidy of 2,000 Prussian thalers failed to persuade the CME to change its route because it wanted to avoid hills where possible, running roughly along the course of the Emscher. As a result of this rejection, the city of Essen later spent over 16,000 thalers to establish a road connecting to Altenessen station.

Until the establishment of Essen BM (Bergisch-Märkische) station (which later became Essen Hauptbahnhof) in 1862, Altenessen station served as Essen station. The freight sector was of particular importance to the station, especially the transport of coal from numerous mines in the two communities. In 1872, the station was renamed Altenessen.

=== Integration in the station in the rail network ===
A nearly two-kilometre long line the station connected via Helene junction to Essen-Stoppenberg was opened on 27 April 1874. A line opened in 1880, connecting this station to Essen BM, which was renamed Essen Hauptbahnhof in 1897. In addition, connections existed to Essen-Nord (renamed Essen Rh in 1885 after its builder, the Rhenish Railway Company) and Essen-Segeroth station, which since 1868 had also been called Essen CM and Essen-Altenessen Rheinisch station (Altenessen Rh, from 1912). After the incorporation of Altenessen in Essen in 1915, the Altenessen station was renamed Essen-Altenessen in 1920.

The station was built as a "wedge" station with central station building between the Cologne-Minden line and the line to Stoppenberg.

By 1887 the tracks were at ground level, with a nearby level crossing over Essen-Horster Strasse, now Altenessener Strasse. The approximately 170–180 trains running per day (not including shunting) meant that the crossing was closed for up to seven hours each day. That made it necessary to rebuild the station, the street and the line. Altenessener Strasse was lowered by 2.64 meters, while the rail lines were raised and three bridges were built. The bridge over Altenessener Strasse and Lierfeldstraße on the line to Stoppenberg was opened on 30 September 1901. The bridge over Altenessener Strasse on the main line was opened on 10 November 1901.

=== The Second World War and later ===
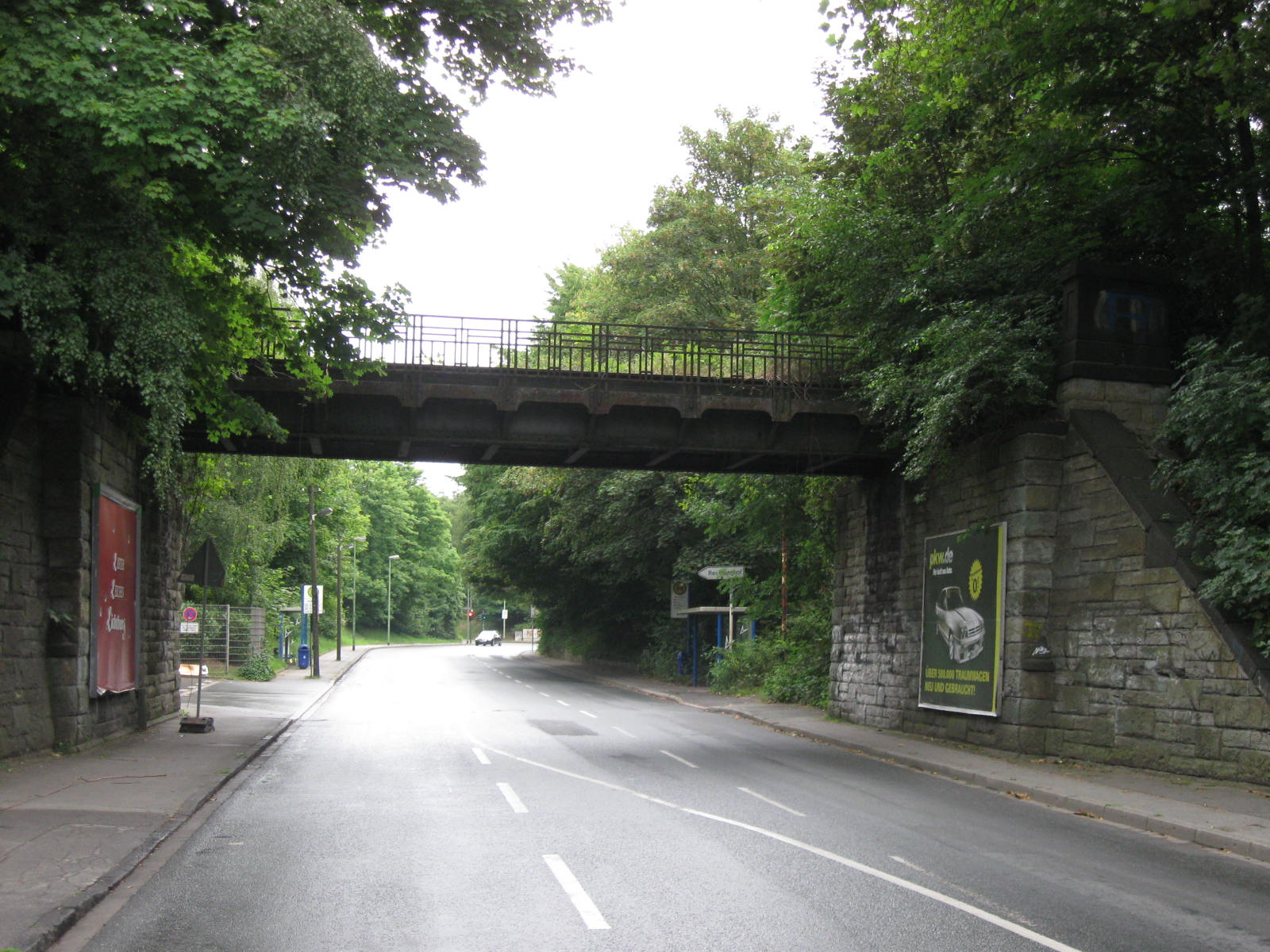
The rail bridge over Lierfeldstraße linking Altenessen with Essen

In the Second World War there was a slave labour camp of the railway division (Reichsbahndirektion) of Essen/Ruhr at the station for 27 French prisoners. Heavy air raids in October 1944 destroyed the railway tracks, stopping train operations run through Altenessen. Several bombs also hit the station.

The station was renovated in 1999, following the demolition of the station building.

== Current services ==
Today the station serves only as a stop for local traffic on the route between Oberhausen and Gelsenkirchen. It is served every hour by Regional-Express service RE3, Rhein-Emscher-Express (Düsseldorf–Duisburg–Oberhausen–Altenessen–Gelsenkirchen–Herne–Dortmund–Hamm) Regionalbahn lines RB32 (Rhein-Emscher-Bahn) and RB35 (Emscher-Niederrhein-Bahn) and lines U11 and U17 of the Essen Stadtbahn.

The station is also a hub for urban transport. It is served by tram line 108 (via Essen Hbf, Rüttenscheid, Holsterhausen to Bredeney), bus line 140 (from Borbeck to Stoppenberg), 162/172 (Altenessen ring line) and 183 (Karlsplatz via Stoppenberg to Katerberg) and Essen Stadtbahn lines U11 (Gelsenkirchen-Horst via Essen Hbf to Messe/Gruga) and U17 (Karlsplatz via Essen Hbf to Margarethenhöhe).
