= Rüttenscheider Stern station =

Underground station in Essen, Germany

Coordinates: 51°26′16″N 7°0′20″E

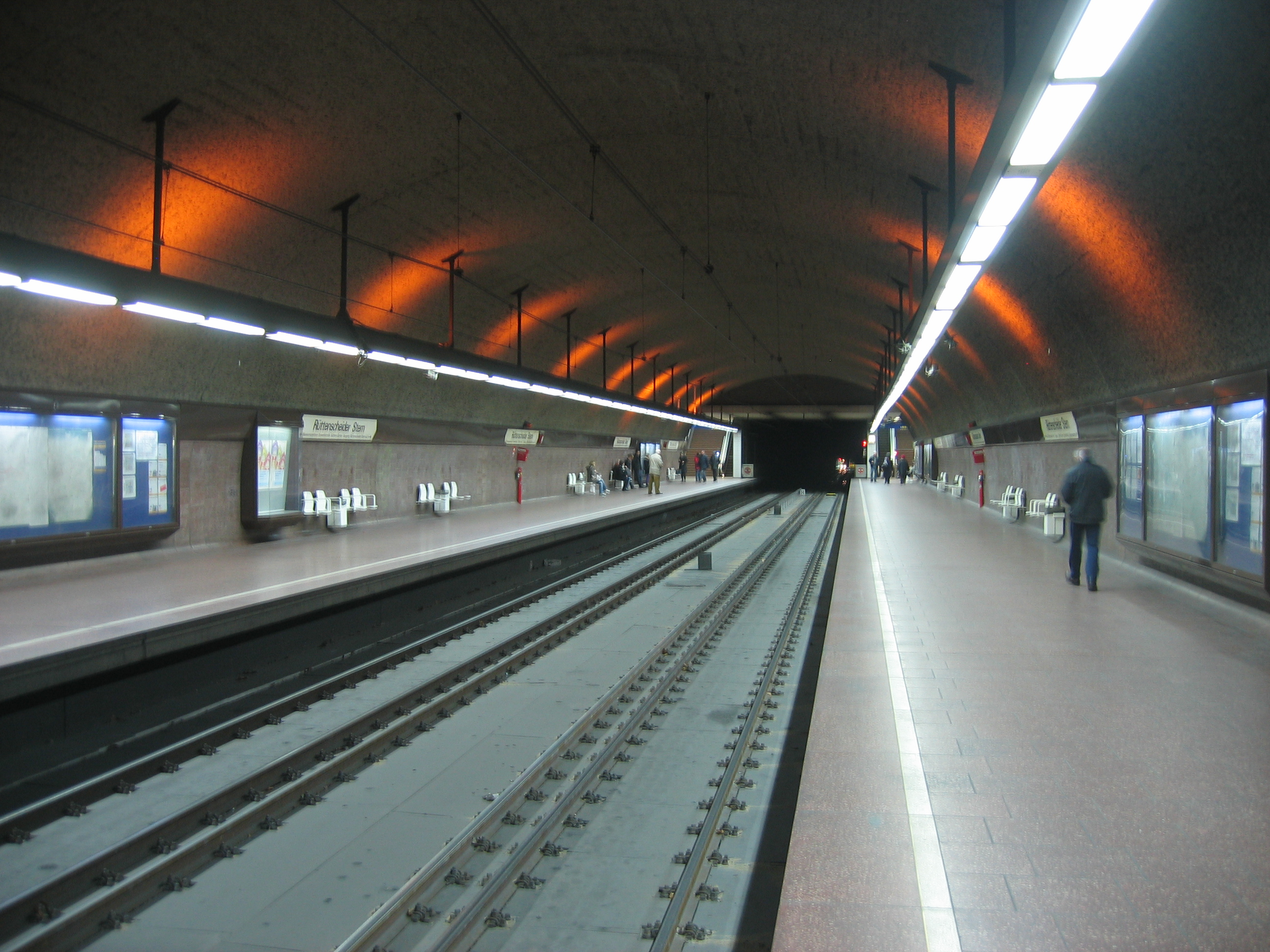
Rüttenscheider Stern station in 2009

Rüttenscheider Stern is an underground station on the Essen Stadtbahn line U11 in Essen. The station lies on Rüttenscheider Stern in the district of Rüttenscheid. It is equipped with three-rail tracks to allow tramway cars of the lines 101 and 107 to stop at the station as well.

The station was opened on June 1, 1986 and consists of two side-platform with two rail tracks. On the surface, it provides connection to the 106 tramway line.

Preceding station	Rhine-Ruhr Stadtbahn	Following station
Martinstraße towards Messe West-Süd Gruga	U11	Philharmonie towards Buerer Straße
