= Trams in Essen =

Tramway network in Germany

Coordinates: 51°26′14″N 07°00′04″E

Essen tramway network
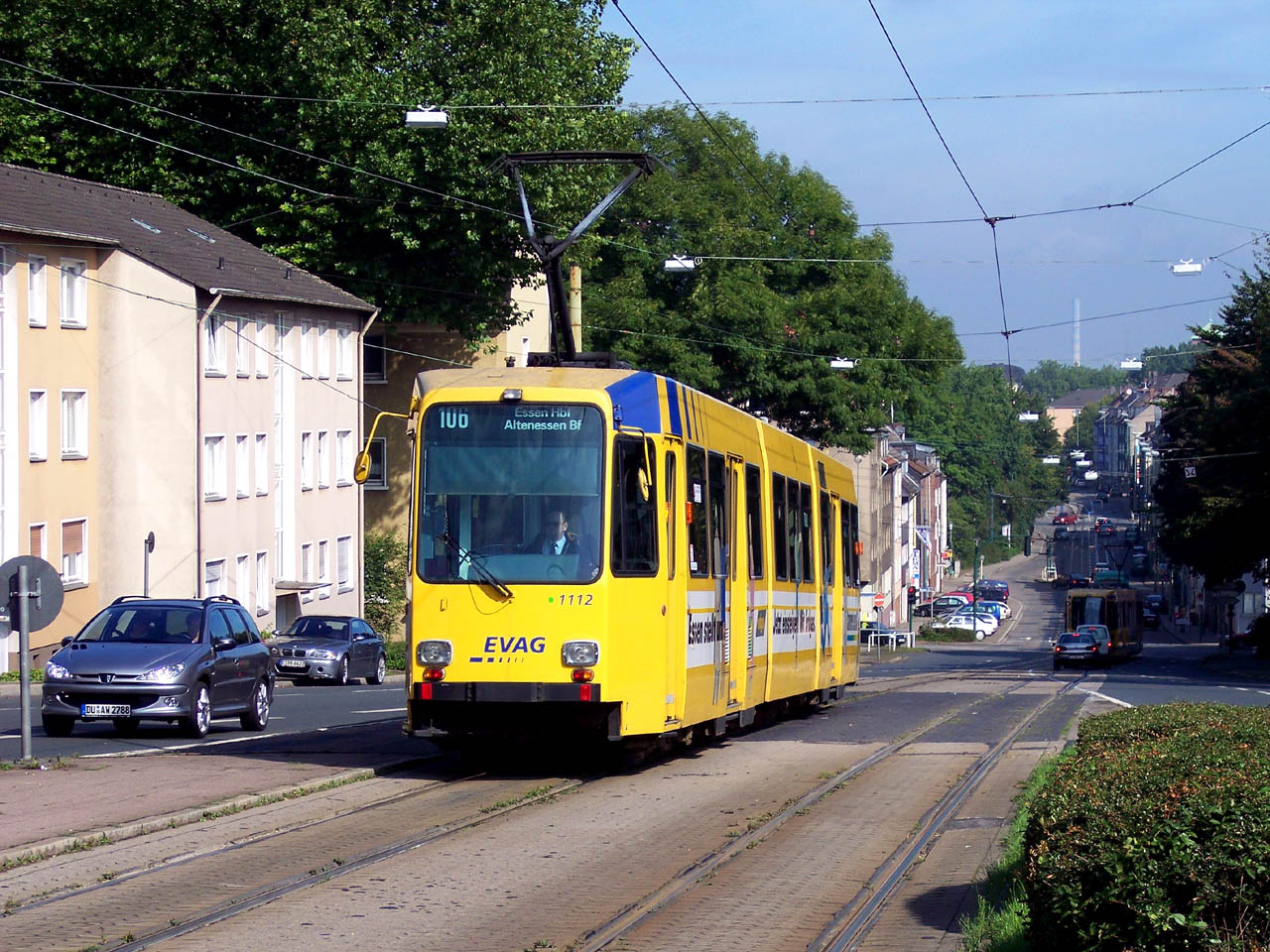
- An M8C tram at Hobeisenbrücke

Operation
- Locale: Essen, North Rhine-Westphalia, Germany
- Open: 23 August 1893
- Status: Operational
- Lines: 7
- Operator: Ruhrbahn

Infrastructure
- Track gauge: 1,000 mm (3 ft 3 3/8 in)
- Propulsion system: Electricity
- Electrification: 750 V DC

Statistics
- Route length: 52.4 km (32.6 mi)
Overview
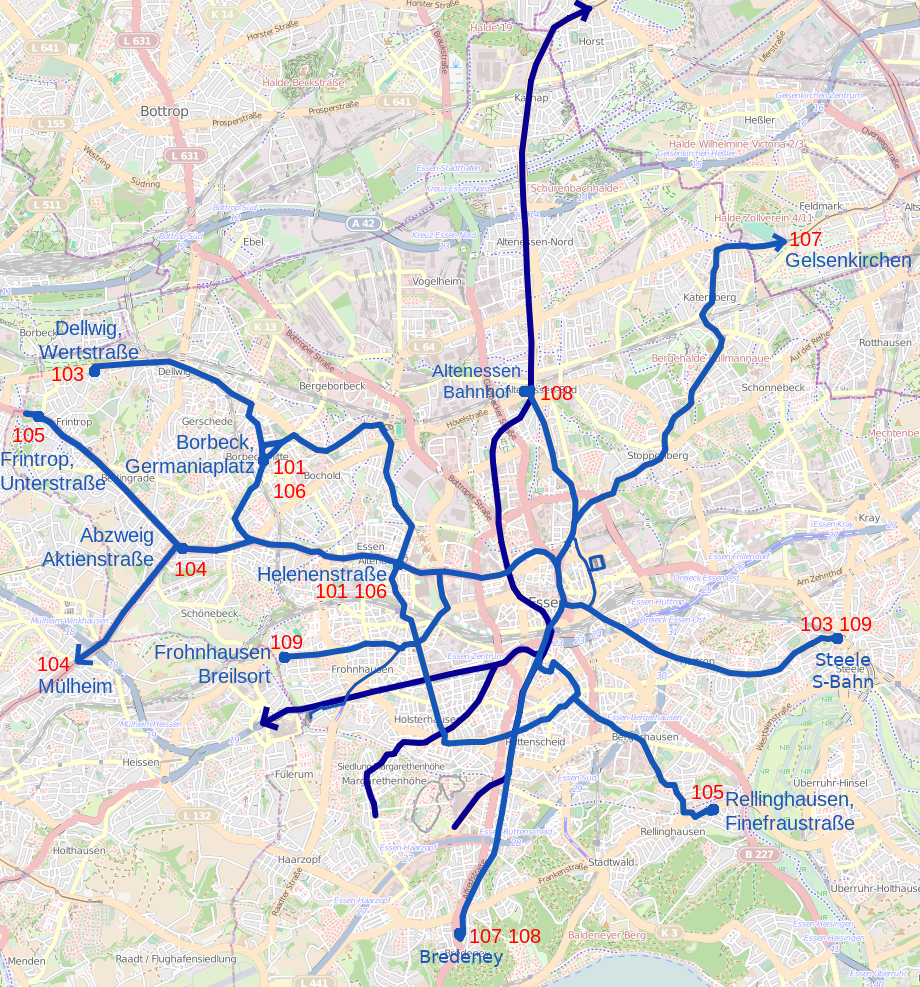
The network in 2013 (dark blue: Stadtbahn Essen)
- Website: http://www.ruhrbahn.de/ Ruhrbahn (in German)

The Essen tramway network (German: Straßenbahnnetz Essen) is a 52.4-kilometer (32.6 mi) network of tramways forming part of the public transport system in Essen, a city in the federal state of North Rhine-Westphalia, Germany. Parts of the system also serve the neighbouring city of Gelsenkirchen.

Opened in 1893, the network has been operated since 1954 by Ruhrbahn (formerly Essener Verkehrs-AG), and is integrated in the Verkehrsverbund Rhein-Ruhr (VRR).

The network is complemented by the three light rail lines of the Essen Stadtbahn.

== Lines ==
As of November 2010, the 52.4-kilometer (32.6 mi) tram network consisted of the following seven lines:

Line	Route	Headway Mon.-Fri.	Headway Sat.	Headway Sun.
101	(Bredeney – Rüttenscheid –) Essen Hbf – Bergeborbeck Bf – Borbeck Germaniaplatz	10	15	30/15
103	Dellwig Wertstr. – Borbeck – Altendorf – Rathaus Essen – Essen Hbf/Hollestraße (– Huttrop – Steele (S))^{1}	10	15	30/15
104	MH-Flughafen – Stadtmitte – MH-Grenze Borbeck – E-Schönebeck Abzw. Aktienstr.	10/20	15/30	30
105	Frintrop Unterstr. – Altendorf – Essen Hbf – Bergerhausen – Rellinghausen Finefraustr.	10	15	30/15
106	Altenessen Bf – Rathaus Essen – Essen Hbf – Rüttenscheid – Essen West (S) – Helenenstr. (– Bergeborbeck Bf)	10	15	15
107	Gelsenkirchen Hbf – Feldmark – E-Katernberg – **Abzweig Katernberg – Zollverein – Stoppenberg – Rathaus Essen** – Hollestr./Essen Hbf – Rüttenscheid – Bredeney (KulturLinie 107)^{2/3}	20/10/5	30/15	30/15
109	Frohnhausen Breilsort – Alfred Krupp Schule – Berliner Platz – Rathaus Essen – Huttrop – Steele (S)	10	15	15

Sections with shorter headways in Bold, sections with longer headways in italics.
^{1} During rush hour via Hollestraße to Steele, at shoulder times only to Hollestraße. and in off peak times Rathaus Essen to Essen Hbf.
^{2} Line is operated jointly by Ruhrbahn/BOGESTRA (almost exclusively with Ruhrbahn rolling stock).
^{3} Extra services during rush hour from Rathaus Essen to Hollestraße, other services from Rathaus via Hbf. to Bredeney.

== Rolling stock ==
Current fleet:

Fleet #	Image	Type	Year	Make	Model
1501–1534		M8D-NF1	1999–2001	ADtranz/Bombardier	Flexity Classic
1601–1627		M8D-NF2	2013–15	Bombardier	Flexity Classic
8001–8015		M8D-NF2	2015–16	Bombardier	Flexity Classic
1051–1052		M8D-NF4	2021	Bombardier	Flexity Classic
1053–1063(+19 on order)		M8D-NF4	2022–23	Alstom	Flexity Classic

== See also ==
- Essen Stadtbahn
- Trams in Germany
- List of town tramway systems in Germany
