= Altenessen =

Borough of Essen, Germany

Coordinates: 51°29′N 7°01′E

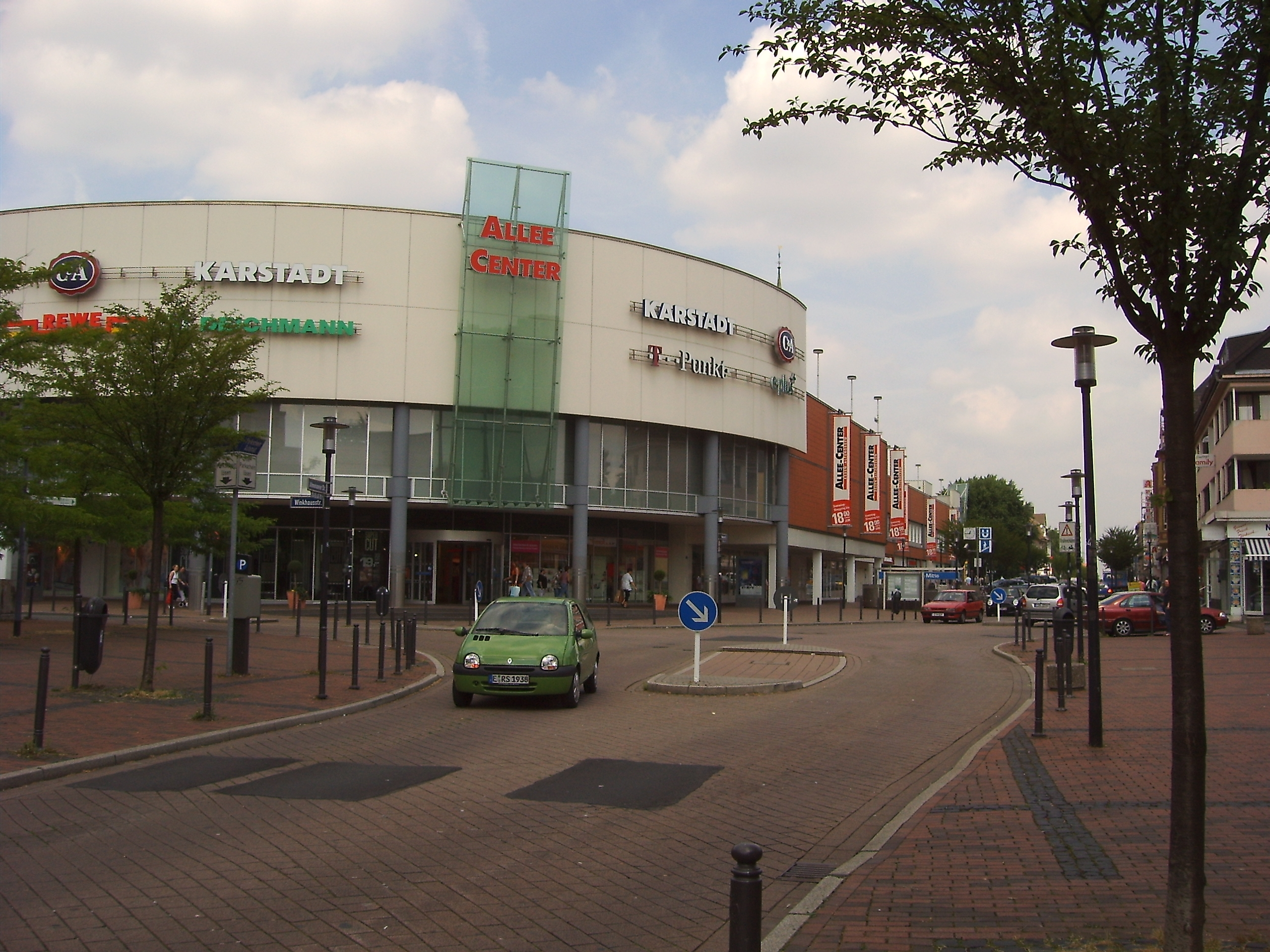
The shopping mall of AlleeCenter in Altenessen

Altenessen (German pronunciation: [ˈaltn̩ˌʔɛsn̩], lit. 'Old Essen') is a northern borough of the city of Essen, Germany. Officially it is divided into the two boroughs of Altenessen-Nord (Altenessen-North) and Altenessen-Süd (Altenessen-South). Because of its size, Altenessen was divided into two parts, when it was incorporated into the city of Essen in 1915. Around 44.000 people live here.

The cultural centre Zeche Carl is located in Altenessen.

== Geography ==
Altenessen borders the boroughs of Vogelheim and Bochold to the west, the Nordviertel to the south, Katernberg and Stoppenberg in the east and Karnap in the north. The Emscher River and the parallel Rhein-Herne-Kanal are forming the boundaries here.
