= Karlsplatz station (Essen) =

Underground station in Altenessen, Essen

Coordinates: 51.5°N 7°E

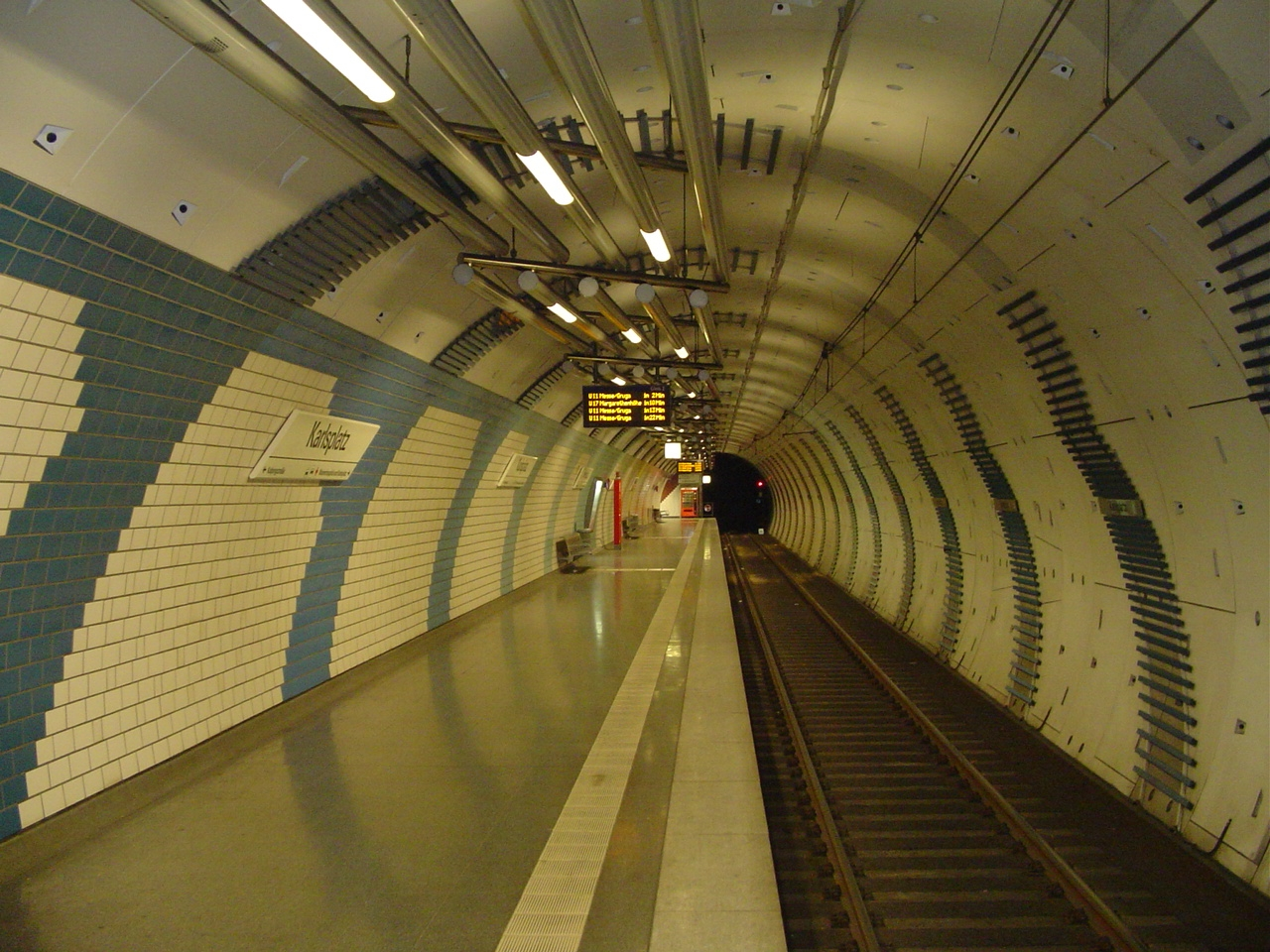
Karlsplatz station

Karlsplatz is an underground station of the Essen Stadtbahn in Altenessen, Essen. Lines U11 and U17 call the station as well as buses 172, 173, and 183. It is located below Altenessener Straße at the crossroads of Johanniskirchstraße. The station has two tracks. There is a lift in operation. Line U17 terminates here.

The station opened on 30 September 2001. The Marienhospital is located nearby.

| Preceding station | Rhine-Ruhr Stadtbahn | Following station |
|---|---|---|
| Altenessen Mitte towards Messe West-Süd Gruga | U11 | II. Schichtstraße towards Buerer Straße |
| Altenessen Mitte towards Margarethenhöhe | U17 | Terminus |
