= Essen-Frohnhausen station =

Railway station in Essen, Germany

Essen Frohnhausen
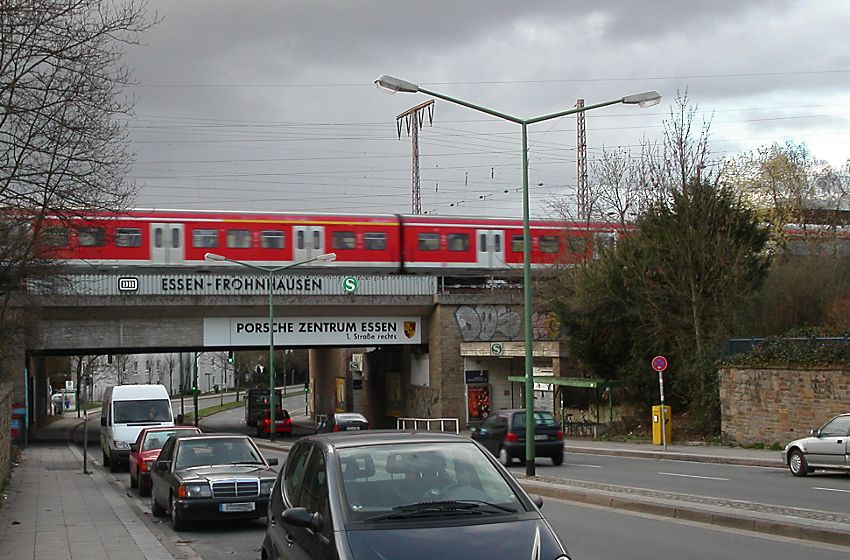
- Entrance to Essen-Fronhausen from Onckenstraße in 2006

General information
- Location: Onckenstraße 61, Essen, NRW; Germany
- Coordinates: 51°27′18″N 6°57′55″E
- Line: Dortmund–Duisburg
- Platforms: 2
- Train operators: DB Regio NRW

Construction
- Accessible: No

Other information
- Station code: 1701
- DS100 code: EEFO
- IBNR: 8001906
- Category: 4
- Fare zone: VRR: 350
- Website: www.bahnhof.de

History
- Opened: 26 May 1974

Services
Preceding station	Rhine-Ruhr S-Bahn	Following station
Mülheim (Ruhr) Hbf towards Solingen Hbf	S1	Essen West towards Dortmund Hbf
Mülheim (Ruhr) Hbf towards Oberhausen Hbf	S3	Essen West towards Hattingen (Ruhr) Mitte
Location
- Location within North Rhine-Westphalia

Essen-Frohnhausen station is situated in Essen in western Germany. It is served by lines S1 and S3 of the Rhine-Ruhr S-Bahn.

== History ==
The Essen-Frohnhausen S-Bahn station was built with the introduction of the two S-Bahn lines on 26 May 1974. It was on the S1 line, initially running between Bochum and Duisburg-Großenbaum, and the S3, running between Oberhausen and Hattingen.

The southern platform track then, as now, serves trains towards Essen and the northern platform track serves trains towards Duisburg and Oberhausen.

Between them is double track without access to platforms, which forms part of the line to Essen-Borbeck, used by the Regional-Express service RE14 (Der Borkener), and S-Bahn line S9, which replaced the regional service N9, which ran until 1998.

== Current situation ==
The station is exclusively used by lines S1 and S3 of the Rhine-Ruhr S-Bahn (timetable routes 450.1 and 450.3).

It is classified by Deutsche Bahn as a category 4 station. The two platforms are both accessible by stairs from the east and from the west. To the north of the station there is a station parking area.

== Transport services ==
Currently, the station is served by line S 1 and S 3 of the Rhine-Ruhr S-Bahn.

Line	Route	Frequency
S1	Dortmund – Bochum – Essen – Essen-Frohnhausen – Mülheim (Ruhr) – Duisburg – Düsseldorf Flughafen – Düsseldorf – Hilden – Solingen	20 min
S3	Hattingen – Bochum-Dahlhausen – Essen – Essen-Frohnhausen – Oberhausen	20 min
