= Essen-Gerschede station =

Railway station in Germany

Essen Gerschede
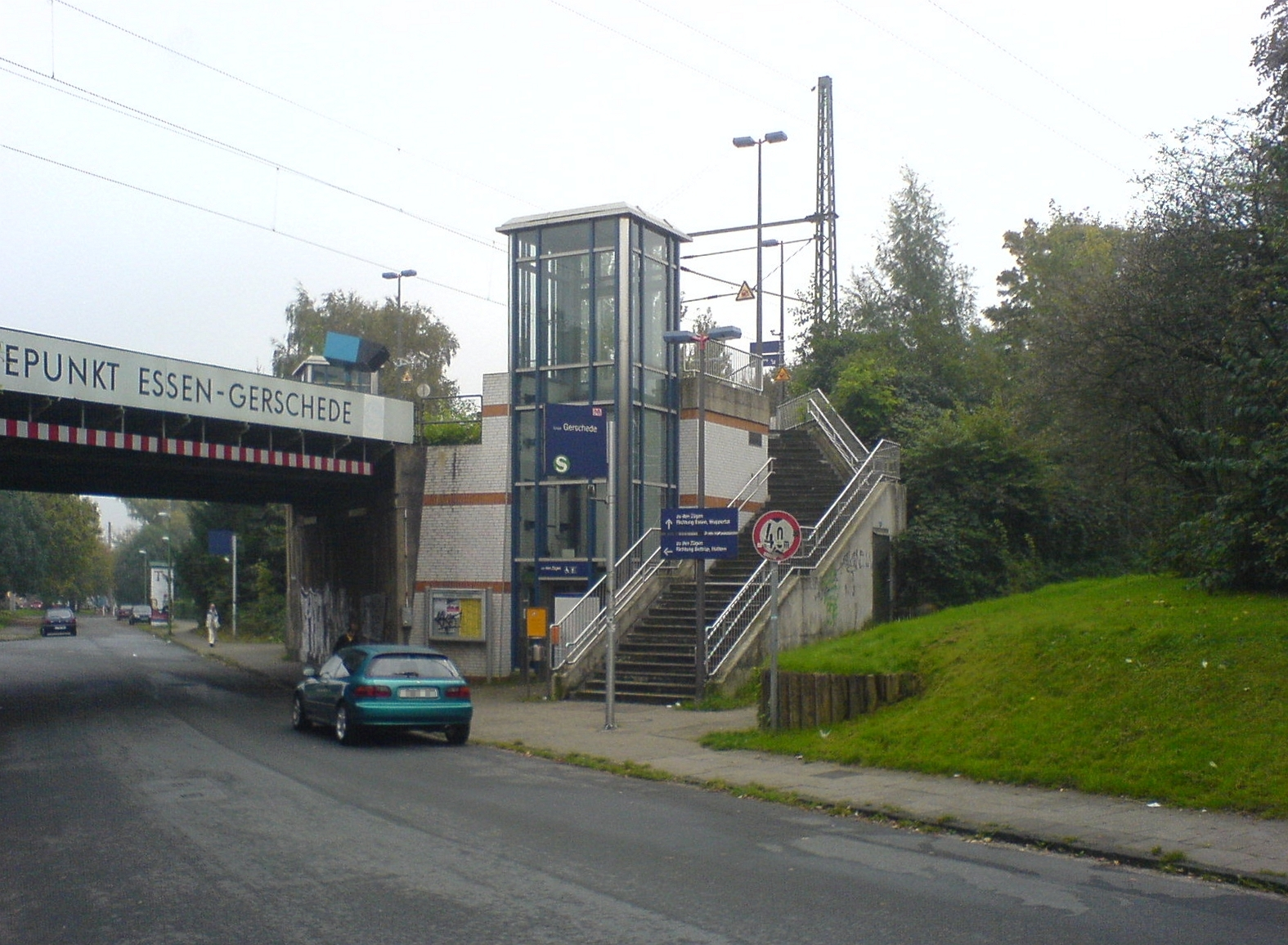

General information
- Location: Münstermannstraße 2, Essen, NRW
- Coordinates: 51°28′58″N 6°56′37″E
- Owner: Deutsche Bahn
- Line: Essen–Bottrop
- Platforms: Side platforms
- Tracks: 2

Construction
- Accessible: yes

Other information
- Fare zone: VRR: 352
- Website: www.bahnhof.de

Services
Preceding station	Rhine-Ruhr S-Bahn	Following station
Essen-Dellwig Ost towards Haltern am See or Recklinghausen Hbf	S9	Essen-Borbeck towards Hagen Hbf
Location

Essen-Gerschede is a railway station in Essen, North Rhine-Westphalia, Germany. The station is located on the Essen–Bottrop railway and is served by S-Bahn services operated by DB Regio.

== Tram service ==
- 103
