= Essen West station =

Railway station in Essen, Germany

Essen West
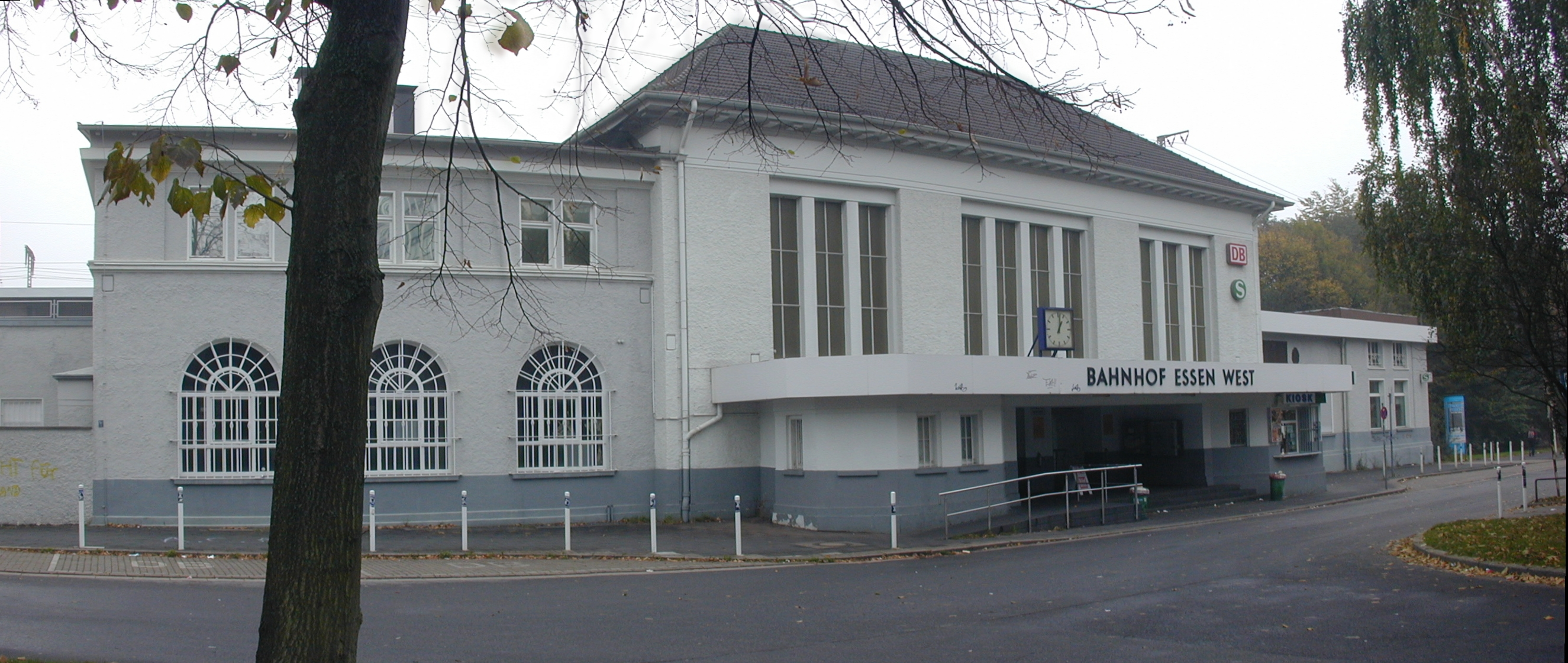
- Essen West station in 2007

General information
- Location: Am Westbahnhof 1, Essen, NRW, Germany
- Coordinates: 51°27′15″N 6°58′48″E
- Owner: Deutsche Bahn
- Lines: Duisburg-Dortmund railway; Essen–Bottrop railway
- Platforms: 4
- Tracks: 8

Construction
- Accessible: yes

Other information
- Station code: 1693
- DS100 code: EENW
- IBNR: 8001898
- Category: 4
- Fare zone: VRR: 350
- Website: www.bahnhof.de

History
- Opened: 1880 to 1889

Services
Preceding station	NordWestBahn	Following station
Essen-Borbeck towards Borken (Westf) or Coesfeld (Westf)	RE 14	Essen Hbf Terminus
Preceding station	DB Regio NRW	Following station
Mülheim (Ruhr) Hbf towards Wesel	RE 49	Essen Hbf towards Wuppertal Hbf
Preceding station	Rhine-Ruhr S-Bahn	Following station
Essen-Frohnhausen towards Solingen Hbf	S1	Essen Hbf towards Dortmund Hbf
Essen-Frohnhausen towards Oberhausen Hbf	S3	Essen Hbf towards Hattingen (Ruhr) Mitte
Essen-Borbeck Süd towards Haltern am See or Recklinghausen Hbf	S9	Essen Hbf towards Hagen Hbf
Location

Essen West station is situated in Essen on the Witten/Dortmund–Oberhausen/Duisburg railway in the German state of North Rhine-Westphalia. It is served by lines S1, S3 and S9 of the Rhine-Ruhr S-Bahn.

== History ==
The section of the Witten/Dortmund–Oberhausen/Duisburg railway between Essen and Mülheim an der Ruhr was opened by the Bergisch-Märkische Railway Company on 1 March 1862.

The location of the station was selected as a result of its proximity to coal mines and in particular to the Krupp cast steel works. In the 1880s, it was opened as Altendorf station. Later it was renamed Altendorf-Cronenberg, in 1898 it was renamed Altendorf Essen-Süd. In 1901, with the incorporation of Altendorf and Frohnhausen into the city of Essen, the station was renamed Essen West.

Originally a former residence of the workers colony of Kronenberg on the north side of the former railway line and east of the present station served as the station building.

In 1912 and 1913, the current station building was built south of the line and a few hundred metres west of the old station. At times, it contained a station restaurant. After severe war damage to the entire station precinct in the Second World War, the not yet repaired Essen West station was mocking called Wasserbahnhof (“water station”). The station building was repaired with changes. The completely rebuilt station restaurant opened in March 1949.

Essen West Station has been served by two S-Bahn lines S1 and S3 since 1974 and also by line S9 since 1998.

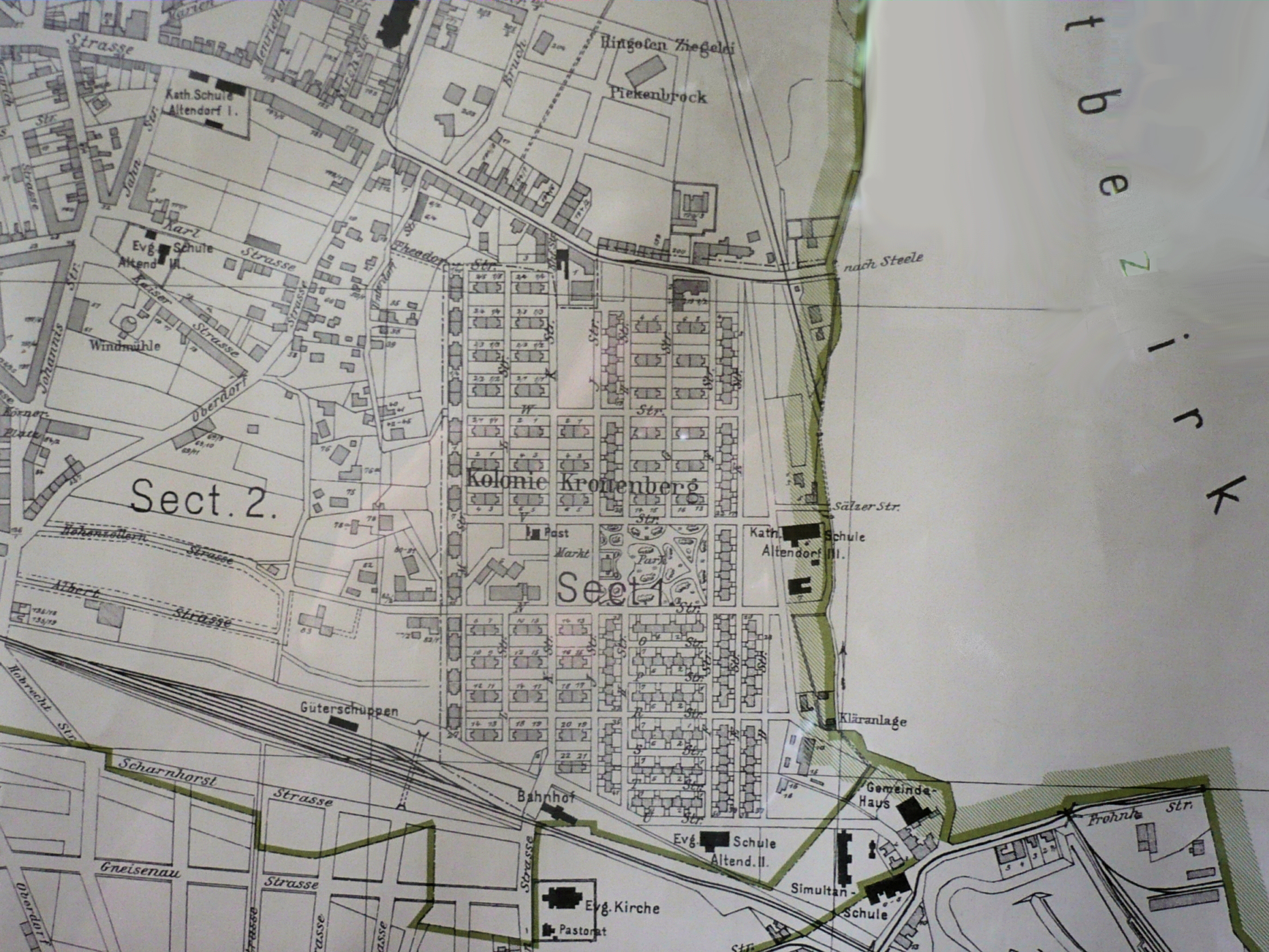
Location of the old Altendorf Essen-Süd station on a map of 1898

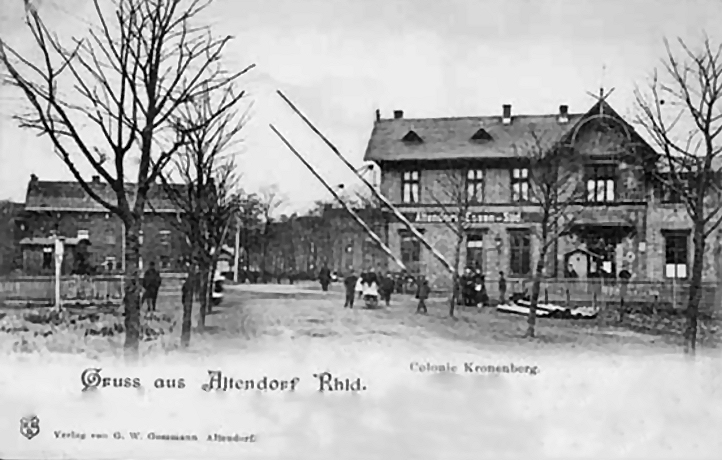
Altendorf Essen-Süd station between 1898 and 1901

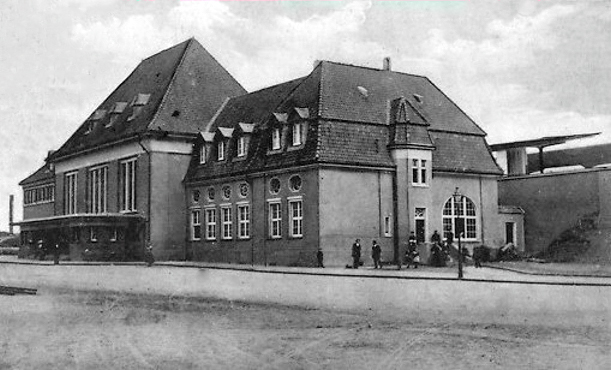
Entrance building about 1913

== Current situation ==
The station is exclusively served by the Rhine-Ruhr S-Bahn. It lies on the Witten/Dortmund–Oberhausen/Duisburg railway and the Mülheim-Heißen–Oberhausen-Osterfeld Nord railway. It is classified by Deutsche Bahn as a category 4 station. An underpass leads from the station building, which was built in 1913, under the four tracks. The platforms were renovated in 2012 and 2013. A kiosk has replaced the former restaurant.

== Transport services ==
The station is served by two Regional-Express services: the RE 14 (Der Borkener) and the RE 49 (Wupper-Lippe-Express). It is served by lines S 1, S 2 and S 9 of the Rhine-Ruhr S-Bahn.

Line	Route	Frequency
RE 14	Dorsten – Gladbeck West – Bottrop – Essen West – Essen – Essen-Steele	60 mins
RE 49	Wesel – Oberhausen – Mülheim – Essen West –Essen – Wuppertal-Vohwinkel – Wuppertal	60 mins
S1	Dortmund – Bochum – Essen – Essen West – Mülheim (Ruhr) – Duisburg – Düsseldorf Flughafen – Düsseldorf – Hilden – Solingen	30 min
S3	Hattingen – Bochum-Dahlhausen – Essen – Essen West – Oberhausen	30 min
S9	Hagen - Wuppertal – Wuppertal-Vohwinkel – Velbert-Langenberg – Essen – Essen West – Bottrop – Gladbeck West – Recklinghausen / Haltern am See	30 min
