= Essen-Dellwig Ost station =

Rhine-Ruhr S-Bahn station

Essen Dellwig Ost
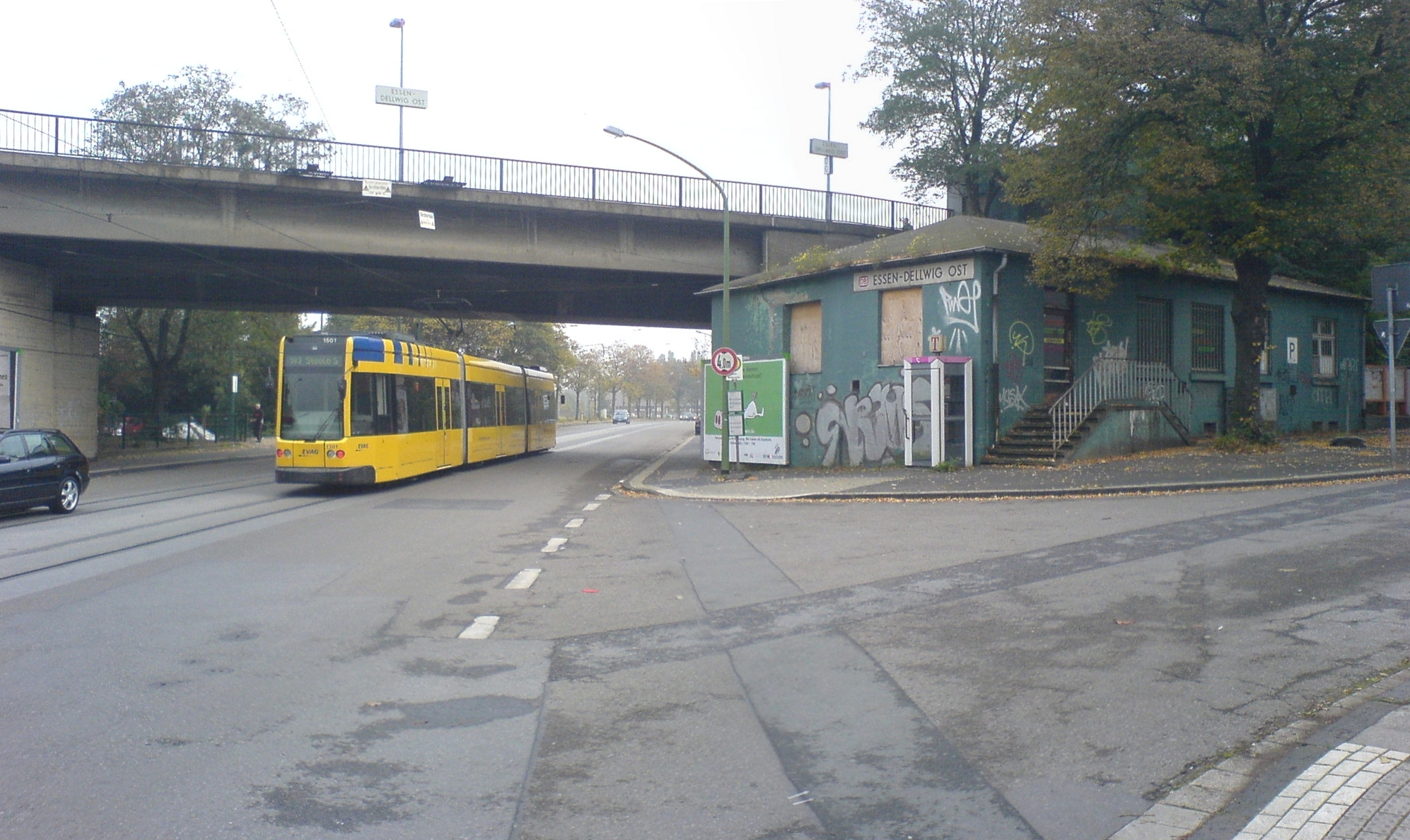

General information
- Location: Essen, NRW; Germany
- Coordinates: 51°29′15″N 6°55′37″E
- Owner: DB Netz
- Operator: DB Station&Service
- Line: Essen-Bottrop railway
- Platforms: 1 side platform
- Tracks: 1
- Train operators: Abellio Rail NRW

Construction
- Accessible: Yes

Other information
- Station code: 1711
- DS100 code: EEDO
- IBNR: 8001913
- Category: 4
- Fare zone: VRR: 352
- Website: www.bahnhof.de

Services
Preceding station	Rhine-Ruhr S-Bahn	Following station
Bottrop Hbf towards Haltern am See or Recklinghausen Hbf	S9	Essen-Gerschede towards Hagen Hbf
Location
- Location within North Rhine-Westphalia

Essen-Dellwig Ost is a railway station in Essen, North Rhine-Westphalia, Germany. The station is located on the Essen–Bottrop railway and is served by S-Bahn services operated by DB. The station is located 300m away from Essen-Dellwig station.
