= Witten/Dortmund–Oberhausen/Duisburg railway =

Railway in Germany

Witten–Bochum/Dortmund railway
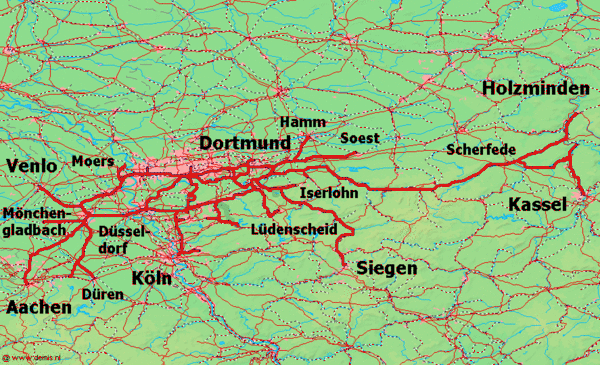
- Bergisch-Märkische Eisenbahn-Gesellschaft network

Overview
- Line number: 2140 (Witten–Bochum-Langendreer); 2125 (Witten–Dortmund)
- Locale: North Rhine-Westphalia

Service
- Route number: 440 (Witten–Essen); 427 (Witten–Dortmund)

Technical
- Track gauge: 1,435 mm (4 ft 8 1/2 in) standard gauge
- Electrification: 15 kV/16.7 Hz AC overhead catenary
- Operating speed: 160 km/h (99.4 mph) (maximum)

Dortmund–Duisburg railway

Overview
- Line number: 2184 (Duisburg–Mülheim-Styrum); 2300 (mainline: Mülheim-Styrum–Essen); 2160 (mainline: Essen–Bochum); 2158 (mainline: Bochum–Dortmund); 2290 (S-Bahn: Duisburg–Mülheim-Styrum); 2291 (S-Bahn: Mülheim-Styrum–Bochum); 2190 (S-Bahn: Bochum–Dortmund)

Service
- Route number: 415 (Duisburg–Dortmund); 440 (Essen–Witten); 450.1 (S-Bahn: Duisburg–Dortmund); 450.3 (S-Bahn: Oberhausen–Essen-Steele Ost); 450.9 (S-Bahn: Essen-West–Essen-Steele)

Mülheim-Styrum–Oberhausen/Duisburg-Ruhrort

Overview
- Line number: 2183 (Oberhausen–Mülheim-Styrum); 2188 (Altstaden–Mülheim-Styrum); 2300 (Duisburg-Ruhrort–Mülheim-Styrum)

Service
- Route number: 450.3 (Oberhausen–Essen-Steele Ost)

The Witten/Dortmund, Oberhausen/Duisburg railway is one of the most important railways in Germany. It is the main axis of long distance and regional rail transport on the east–west axis of the Ruhr and is served by Intercity-Express, InterCity, Regional-Express, Regionalbahn and S-Bahn trains.

Strictly speaking, the line today consists of two parallel two-track lines, one for mainline trains and the other for S-Bahn trains. On several sections of the line the long-distance tracks and S-Bahn tracks follow separate routes. The long-distance tracks follows the historical route built between 1860 and 1862 by the Bergisch-Märkische Railway Company as an extension of its trunk line between Elberfeld and Dortmund.

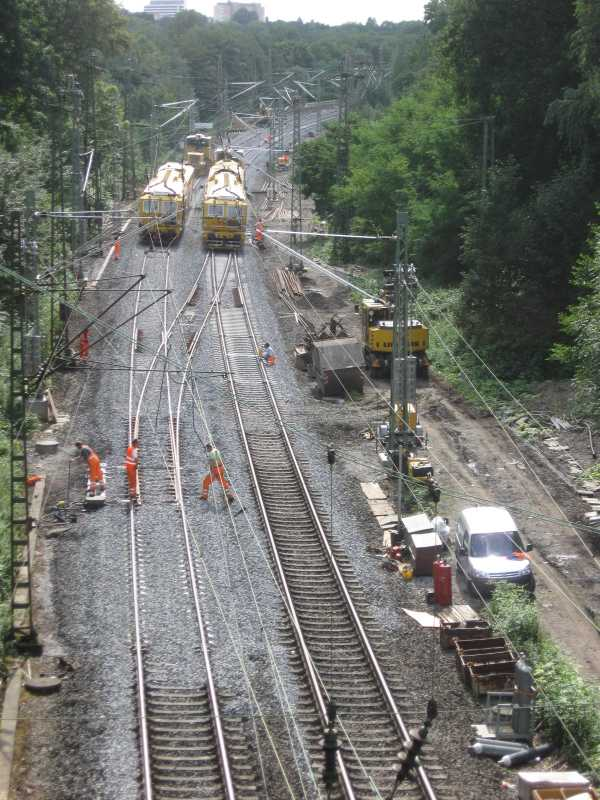
Work at Essen-Kray Süd junction

== History ==
The Cologne-Minden Railway Company (German, old spelling: Cöln-Mindener Eisenbahn-Gesellschaft, CME) planned the route of its trunk line, built from 1845 to 1847, to avoid the construction costs of a line through the very hilly land along the valleys of the Ruhr and Wupper rivers and in order to minimise operating costs. It was thus cut off from the coal mines, which is the mid-19th Century were found on the north bank of the Ruhr.

Between 1847 and 1849 Bergisch-Märkische Railway Company (Bergisch-Märkische Eisenbahn-Gesellschaft, BME) built its own trunk line in the highly industrialised area in the Wupper valley and the Bergisches Land and decided to extend it to the west through the area between the Ruhr and the Emscher rivers. In particular it wanted to connect the coal mines north of the Ruhr with a port on the Rhine.

=== Construction of the original line ===
On 26 October 1860, the first section was opened from Witten BME to Bochum BME (at one time called Bochum Sud station). On 1 March 1862 the section from Bochum to Steele, Essen BME Mülheim BME, Styrum and Oberhausen BME was opened. A few weeks later on 1 May 1862, the section from Styrum to Duisburg BME opened. In the same year, the route from Langendreer BME east to Dortmund BME was rebuilt and opened for passenger traffic on 5 October 1862.

=== Styrum—Ruhrort line ===
In later years the line was steadily improved and branches were built. In 1864 the BME took over the management of the lines of the Aachen-Dusseldorf-Ruhrort Railway Company (formally the Königliche Direction der Aachen-Düsseldorf-Ruhrorter Eisenbahn). On 8 January 1866, it took over the company, including the Ruhrort-Homberg train ferry. It opened a line on 4 December 1867 to Ruhrort from Styrum via Meiderich (Sud), partly parallel with the older line of the CME from Oberhausen crossing the Rhine-Herne Canal on a bridge constructed with gauntlet track.

=== Essen—Bochum—Herne line ===
On 1 November 1874 the BME opened an additional line parallel to the existing track from Essen BME to Wattenscheid BME and Bochum BME and from there to Riemke, Herne Rottbruch and Herne BME (Bochum–Essen/Oberhausen line). The line was initially used for freight with passenger services commencing on 1 January 1875. After the transfer of the station from the former Bochum BME station to the current Bochum Hauptbahnhof in 1957 the connection from Bochum West to the line to Herne was closed. Instead, a connecting line was built a kilometre east in 1979 from the new Hauptbahnhof to Bochum West.

The route is now divided into two completely different sections. The western section is now used by long-distance services between Duisburg and Dortmund (other services follow the original route), while the northern section is now only used by regional trains to Gelsenkirchen via the Bochum–Gelsenkirchen railway and freight trains.

=== Redevelopment for the S-Bahn ===
As part of the establishment of the Rhine-Ruhr S-Bahn in the early 1970s, the line was rebuilt to have at least four-tracks continuously. On 23 September 1973, the four line section between Mülheim and Mülheim-Styrum was inaugurated and on 10 December 1973 it was extended to Duisburg Hbf. After the opening of two more sections on 11 March 1974 between Essen Hbf and Essen-Steele and between Essen Hbf and Essen West, the service between Duisburg Großenbaum Bochum Hbf was designated as S-Bahn line S1 and the service between Oberhausen Hbf and Hattingen designated as S3.

When the Technical University of Dortmund was established in 1968, it was deemed necessary to connect it to the S-Bahn network and on 24 September 1983 a completely new route—partly underground—was opened from Bochum-Langendreer to Dortmund-Dorstfeld, where the line joins the historic route to Dortmund Hauptbahnhof.

=== Redevelopment for long-distance services ===
To relieve the congested Elberfeld-Dortmund line between Witten and Dortmund a new line (route number 2125) was opened on 29 May 1988 from a flying junction at Stockumer Straße junction in Bochum-Langendreer to Lütgendortmund junction, including a 565-metre-long tunnel, and connecting to the long-distance lines to Dortmund. Since then, all InterCity Express, InterCity and RE4 Regional-Express trains running between Wuppertal and Dortmund use the new line.

=== Partial closure ===
At the beginning of the 20th century the line had up to four parallel tracks used exclusively for freight. With the decline of rail freight traffic after World War II on the line much of this track was subsequently abandoned. Some of it was brought back into operation as part of the S-Bahn or with the construction of the new long-distance tracks between Witten and Dortmund. In recent years only series 515 battery railcars ran on the section between Duisburg-Meiderich Sud and Mülheim (Ruhr)-Styrum, but these services stopped on 1 April 1995 and the line was closed on 1 May 1996. The southern platform of Duisburg-Meiderich Sud station, the embankment to the east and the bridge over the Rhine-Herne Canal were immediately removed.

== Current situation ==
The Witten/Dortmund–Oberhausen/Duisburg railway since its opening has been of immense importance for the railways of the Ruhr area and has therefore been constantly expanded and modernized; six-line sections were not uncommon. Electrification of the line with overhead lines began in the late 1950s. Today, the main route between Dortmund and Duisburg is a four-track line with a maximum line speed generally between 150 and 160 km/h.

The routes to and from Witten are double track and electrified. Its western access is cleared for 120 km/h and the eastern approach through the Oberstraße Tunnel is cleared for up to 140 or 155 km/h.

== Services ==
All of the various categories of German rail passenger services operate between Dortmund and Duisburg.

=== Long-distance services ===
InterCity Express line 10 services (between Berlin and Cologne) operate hourly on the main east–west ICE line. Line 42 (between Dortmund and Munich) operates every two-hours on the north–south ICE line. Additional ICE services are operated as line 31, line 41 (every hour between Duisburg and Essen) and line 91.

Every two hours InterCity trains operate over lines 30 and 51, as well as various services of lines 26, 32, and 55.

=== Regional railways ===
The line is the main axis of the Ruhr Regional-Express. Three Regional-Express services run every hour between Dortmund and Duisburg: the NRW-Express (RE 1) between Aachen and Hamm, continuing every two hours to Paderborn; the Rhein-Weser-Express (RE 6) between Minden and Düsseldorf and the Rhein-Hellweg-Express (RE 11) between Düsseldorf and Hamm.

Line S1 of the Rhine-Ruhr S-Bahn runs at 15-minute intervals between Dortmund and Essen and at 30-minute intervals between Essen and Duisburg on the whole line between Dortmund and Duisburg, using the old line via Steele between Essen and Bochum and the new route opened in 1983 between Bochum and Dortmund. Line S3 runs on the section between Essen-Steele, and Mülheim-Styrum on its route between Hattingen Mitte and Oberhausen, providing a 15-minute interval S-Bahn service on this section in combination with S1.

The section between Witten and Essen is served by Regional Express service RE16 Ruhr-Lenne-Express (Essen to Iserlohn via Hagen) and Regionalbahn service RB40 Ruhr-Lenne-Bahn (Essen–Hagen). The line between Duisburg and Essen is used by the RE2 Rhein-Haard-Express, with the trains returning to the old Rhenish line between Duisburg and Mönchengladbach and between Essen and Münster.

RE14 Emscher-Münsterland-Express (Essen–Bottrop–Gladbeck–Dorsten–Borken / Coesfeld) and Line S9 (Recklinghausen / Haltern am See–Gladbeck–Bottrop–Essen–Wuppertal–Hagen) connect Bottrop with Essen Dellwig on the former Mülheim-Heißen–Oberhausen-Osterfeld Nord line and then connect to the line to Essen at Essen West station (but not at the same platforms). RE14 terminates at Essen-Steele, while S9 continues to the Wuppertal-Vohwinkel–Essen-Überruhr line to Wuppertal and Hagen. A 15-minute frequency is provided jointly by the RE14 and S9: Gladbeck West–Bottrop Hbf–Essen-Borbeck–Essen Hbf–Essen-Steele.
