= Essen-Borbeck Süd station =

Railway station in Essen, Germany

Essen Borbeck Süd
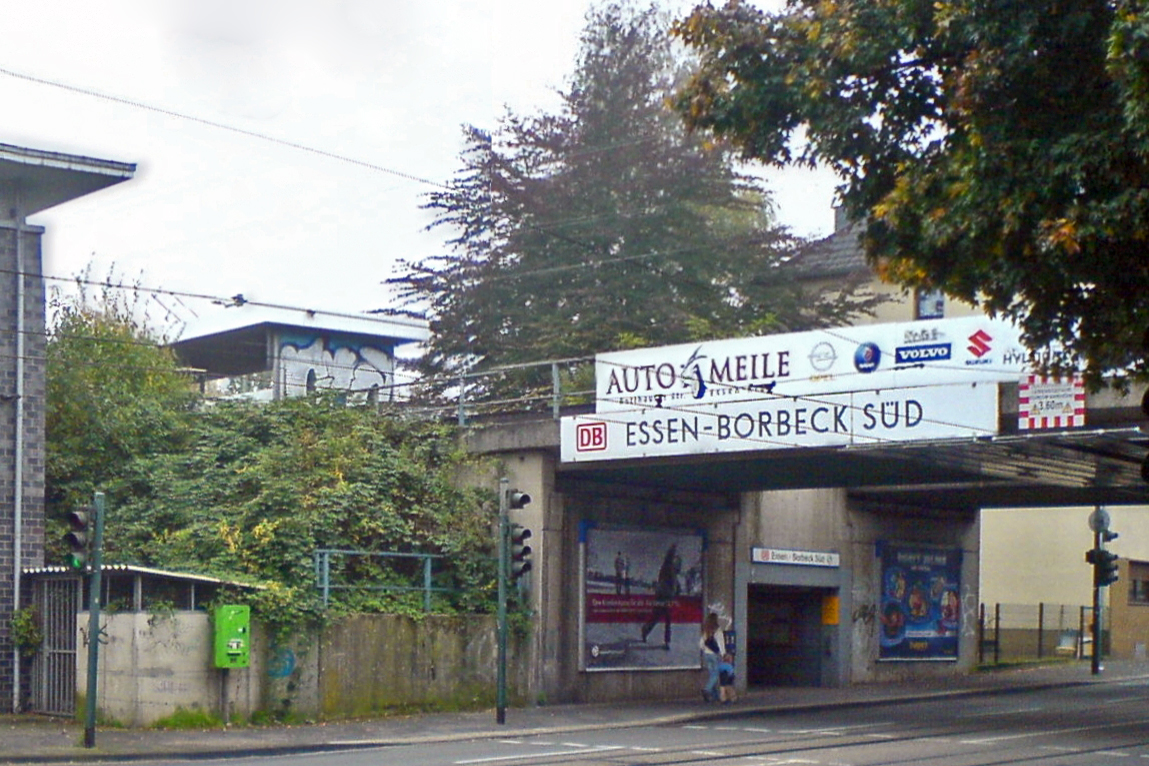

General information
- Location: Altendorfer Straße 532, Essen, NRW
- Coordinates: 51°27′45″N 6°57′13″E
- Owner: Deutsche Bahn
- Line: Essen–Bottrop railway
- Platforms: 2
- Tracks: 2

Construction
- Accessible: No

Other information
- Fare zone: VRR: 352
- Website: www.bahnhof.de

Services
Preceding station	Rhine-Ruhr S-Bahn	Following station
Essen-Borbeck towards Haltern am See or Recklinghausen Hbf	S9	Essen West towards Hagen Hbf
Location

Essen-Borbeck Süd is a railway station in Essen, North Rhine-Westphalia, Germany. The station is located on the Essen–Bottrop railway and is served by S-Bahn services operated by DB Regio.

== Tram service ==
- 103
- 105
