= Mülheim (Ruhr) Hauptbahnhof =

Railway station in Mülheim an der Ruhr, Germany

Mülheim (Ruhr) Hbf
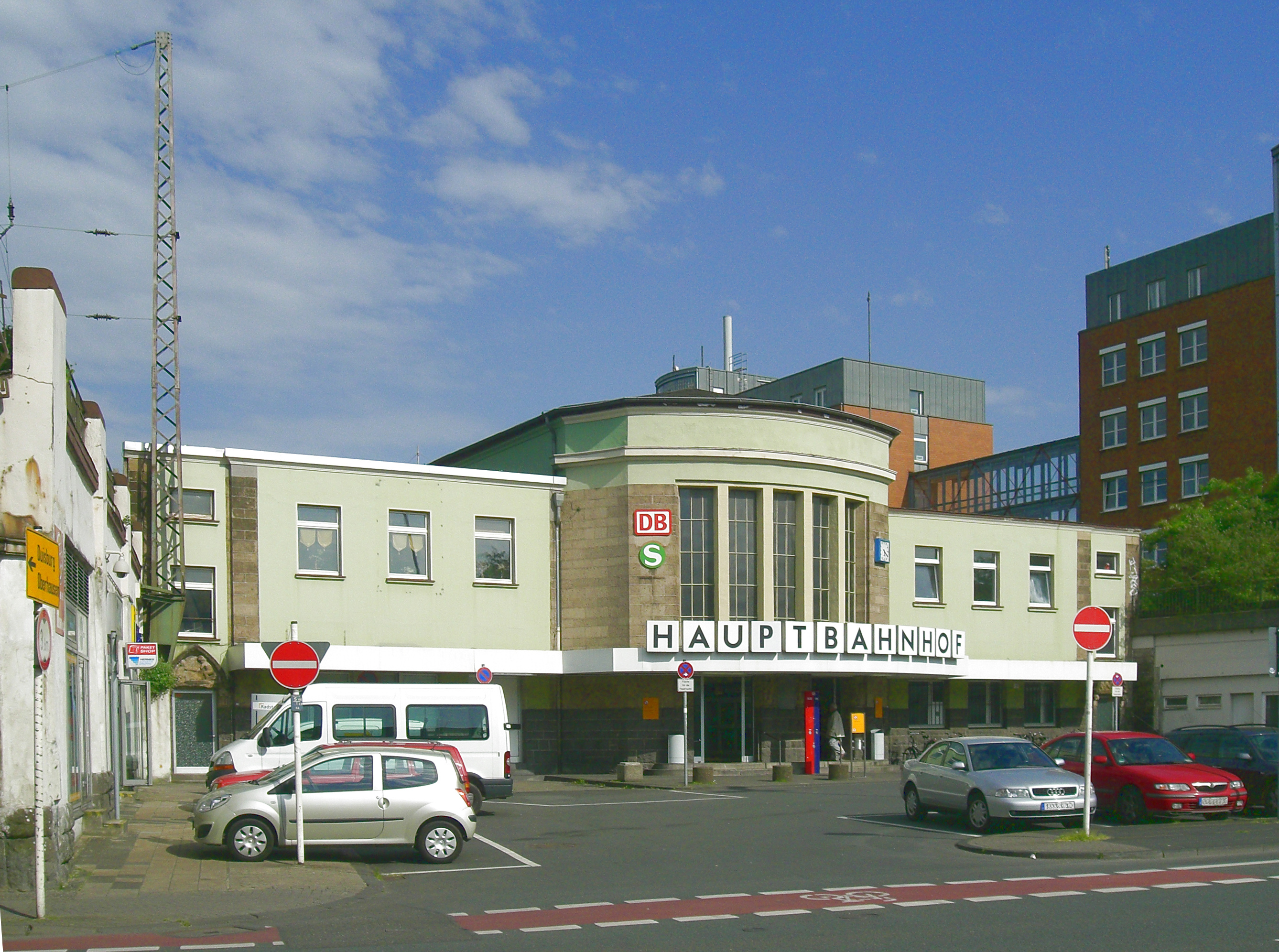
- Entrance of station

General information
- Location: Dieter aus dem Siepen Platz 3 Mülheim an der Ruhr, NRW; Germany
- Coordinates: 51°25′53″N 06°53′11″E
- Owner: Deutsche Bahn
- Operator: DB Netz; DB Station&Service
- Lines: Dortmund–Duisburg (KBS 415, 425, 427, 450.1, 450.3); Rhine-Ruhr S-Bahn S1, S3 (KBS 450.1, 450.3)
- Platforms: 4

Construction
- Accessible: Yes

Other information
- Station code: 4219
- DS100 code: EMLR
- Category: 3
- Fare zone: VRR: 340, 342, and 344
- Website: www.bahnhof.de

History
- Opened: 1 September 1866
Services
Preceding station	National Express Germany	Following station
Duisburg Hbf towards Aachen Hbf	RE 1 (NRW-Express)	Essen Hbf towards Hamm (Westf) Hbf
Duisburg Hbf towards Cologne/Bonn Airport	RE 6 (Rhein-Weser-Express)	Essen Hbf towards Minden
Duisburg Hbf towards Düsseldorf Hbf	RE 11 (Rhein-Hellweg-Express)	Essen Hbf towards Kassel-Wilhelmshöhe
Preceding station	DB Regio NRW	Following station
Duisburg Hbf towards Düsseldorf Hbf	RE 2	Essen Hbf towards Osnabrück Hbf
Duisburg Hbf towards Mönchengladbach Hbf	RE 42	Essen Hbf towards Münster Hbf
Mülheim-Styrum towards Wesel	RE 49	Essen West towards Wuppertal Hbf
Mülheim-Styrum towards Aachen Hbf	RB 33	Essen Hbf towards Essen-Steele
Preceding station	Rhine-Ruhr S-Bahn	Following station
Mülheim-Styrum towards Solingen Hbf	S1	Essen-Frohnhausen towards Dortmund Hbf
Mülheim West towards Oberhausen Hbf	S3	Essen-Frohnhausen towards Hattingen (Ruhr) Mitte
Preceding station	Rhine-Ruhr Stadtbahn	Following station
Terminus	U18	Von-Bock-Straße towards Berliner Platz
Preceding station	Trams in Mülheim/Oberhausen	Following station
Mülheim Stadtmitte towards Uhlenhorst	102	Aktienstraße towards Oberdümpten
Preceding station	Straßenbahn Duisburg	Following station
Mülheim Stadtmitte towards Obermarxloh Schleife	901	Terminus
Location

Mülheim (Ruhr) Hauptbahnhof is a railway station for the city of Mülheim in the German state of North Rhine-Westphalia. It was renamed as a Hauptbahnhof in 1974 at the time of the rebuilding of the Dortmund–Duisburg line as part of the establishment of the Rhine-Ruhr S-Bahn. It is classified by Deutsche Bahn as a category 3 station.

The original station is unusual in that it was built as two adjoining stations by the two main private railways buildings lines in the Ruhr area, the Rhenish Railway Company (Rheinische Eisenbahn-Gesellschaft, RhE) and the Bergisch-Märkische Railway Company (Bergisch-Märkische Eisenbahn Gesellschaft, BME).

== History ==
The station was opened as Mülheim RhE as part of a section of the RhE's mainline through the Ruhr opened on 1 September 1866 between Osterath and Essen. Just to the north of the RhE's station, the BME opened its own station in 1867 as Mülheim-Eppinghofen BME on its own main line opened in 1862 between Dortmund and Duisburg. Although the two railways were nationalised in 1880 and 1882 the two stations were not linked.

On 1 June 1888, the station was renamed Mülheim (Ruhr), but on 11 August 1892 it was again renamed as Mülheim-Eppinghofen because another station (now called Mülheim (Ruhr) West) was then renamed as Mülheim (Ruhr), but it was never popularly accepted as the main station in Mülheim. Between 1905 and 1910 a common station with a peaked roof was built to serve both lines, but it was destroyed during World War II and never rebuilt. During the electrification of the Cologne-Hamm line in the 1950s the stopping place for long-distance trains was moved back to the Eppinghofen station and on 22 May 1955 it was renamed Mülheim (Ruhr) Stadt ("city"). In 1974 the station was relocated with the opening of Rhine-Ruhr S-Bahn and finally renamed Mülheim (Ruhr) Hbf.

During the renovations in 2010 and 2011, the main building was almost completely modernised, the pedestrian tunnels were redesigned, and the station forecourt was renovated. A total of €2.1 million was invested in the renovation of the main building.

With the commissioning of the electronic interlocking system for the Mülheim-Styrum to Essen West area in May 2021, Mülheim Hbf station lost its last set of points. So it is now considered a Haltepunkt (halt) not a bahnhof (station), despite being a Hauptbahnhof (main station).

== Rail services ==
The current station consists of four tracks to the east and west located on the site of the BME station. The RhE lines have been closed and dismantled. No long-distance services have stopped at the station since 14 December 2025. In the 2026 timetable the following lines stop at the station:

Line	Route	Frequency
RE 1 NRW-Express	Aachen – Eschweiler – Düren – Horrem – Cologne – Düsseldorf – Düsseldorf Airport – Duisburg – Mülheim – Essen – Bochum – Dortmund – Hamm	60 min
RE 2 Rhein-Haard-Express	Düsseldorf – Duisburg – Mülheim – Essen – Gelsenkirchen – Recklinghausen – Münster	60 min
RE 6 Rhein-Weser-Express	Minden – Herford – Bielefeld – Hamm – Dortmund – Essen – Mülheim – Duisburg – Düsseldorf Airport – Düsseldorf – Neuss – Cologne – Cologne/Bonn Airport	60 min
RE 11; Rhein-Hellweg-Express	Düsseldorf – Düsseldorf Airport – Duisburg – Mülheim – Essen – Dortmund – Hamm – Paderborn Hbf – Kassel-Wilhelmshöhe	60 min
RE 42; Niers-Haard-Express	Münster – Haltern am See – Recklinghausen – Gelsenkirchen – Essen – Mülheim – Duisburg – Krefeld – Viersen – Mönchengladbach	60 min
RE 49; Wupper-Lippe-Express	Wesel – Oberhausen – Mülheim –Essen – Wuppertal-Vohwinkel – Wuppertal	60 mins
RB 33; Rhein-Niers-Bahn	Essen – Mülheim – Duisburg – Krefeld – Mönchengladbach – Aachen	60 mins
S1	Dortmund – Bochum – Essen – Mülheim – Duisburg – Düsseldorf Flughafen – Düsseldorf – Hilden – Solingen	30 min
S3	Oberhausen – Mülheim – Essen – Hattingen (Ruhr) Mitte	30 min

=== Public transport ===
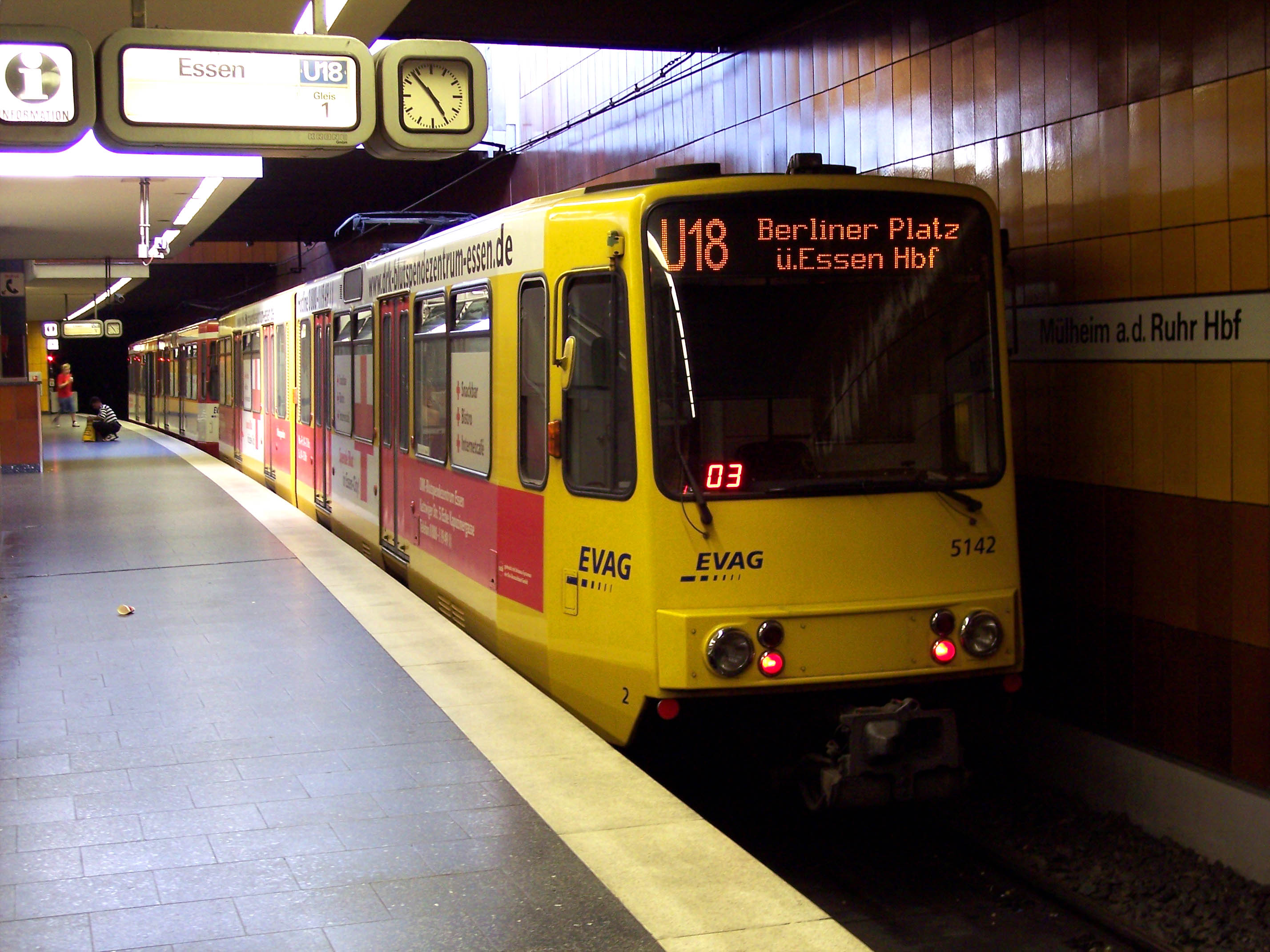
Mülheim U-Bahn station under the main station, 2005

An underground station for line U18 of the Essen Stadtbahn, line 112 of Mülheim/Oberhausen trams, line 102 of the Ruhrbahn and line 901 of Duisburg trams lies adjacent to the former RhE station and is connected to the current station by a corridor.

In addition, the station is served by several bus lines.
