= Essen Hauptbahnhof =

Railway station in Essen, Germany

Essen Hbf
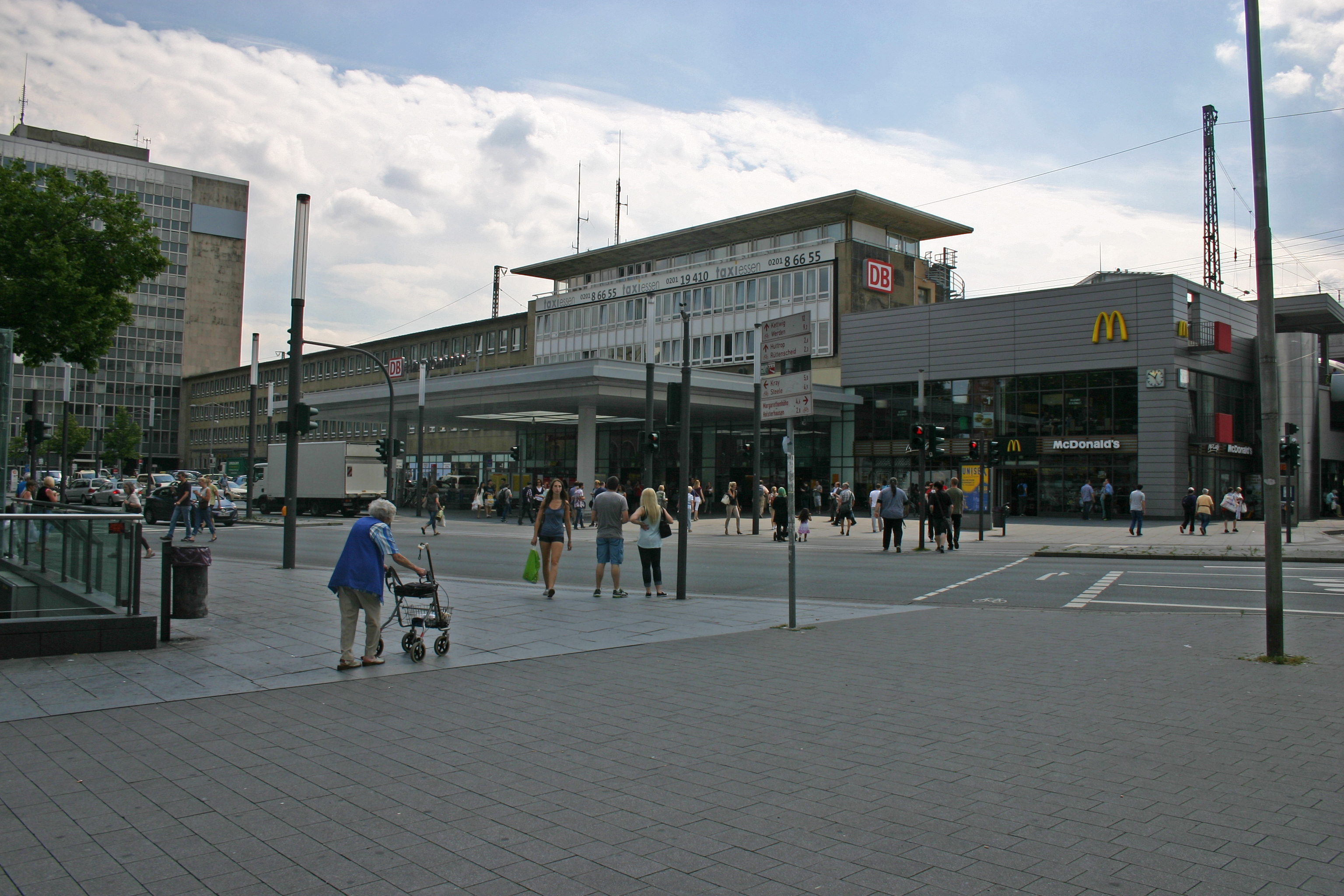
- 2014

General information
- Location: Am Hauptbahnhof 1; 45127 Essen; Stadtkern, Essen, NRW; Germany
- Coordinates: 51°27′06″N 7°00′52″E
- Owner: DB Netz
- Operator: DB Station&Service
- Lines: Witten/Dortmund–Oberhausen/Duisburg (KBS 415, 425, 427, 450.1, 450.3 and 450.9); Essen–Gelsenkirchen (KBS 425 and 450.2); Essen–Essen-Werden (KBS 450.6); Rhine-Ruhr S-Bahn lines S1, S2, S3, S6 and S9 (KBS 450.1, 450.2, 450.3, 450.6 and 450.9)
- Platforms: 13

Construction
- Accessible: Yes
- Architect: 1902: Fritz Klingholz; 1959: Kurt Rasenack, Bernd Figge
- Architectural style: 1902: Gothic Revival; 1959: New Objectivity

Other information
- Station code: 1690
- DS100 code: EE
- IBNR: 8000098
- Category: 1
- Fare zone: VRR: 350
- Website: www.bahnhof.de

History
- Opened: 1862 rebuilt 1902 and 1959

Passengers
- 170,000
Services
Preceding station	Eurostar	Following station
Duisburg Hbf towards Paris-Nord	Eurostar	Dortmund Hbf Terminus
Preceding station	DB Fernverkehr	Following station
Duisburg Hbf towards Passau Hbf	ICE 1 Sprinter	Hamburg Hbf towards Hamburg-Altona
Duisburg Hbf towards Köln Hbf	ICE 10	Bochum Hbf towards Berlin Ostbahnhof
Duisburg Hbf towards Aachen Hbf	ICE 14	Bochum Hbf towards Berlin Ostbahnhof
Duisburg Hbf towards Aachen Hbf	ICE 14	Wanne-Eickel Hbf towards Berlin Ostbahnhof
Duisburg Hbf towards Köln Hbf	ICE 33	Gelsenkirchen Hbf towards Westerland (Sylt)
Duisburg Hbf towards München Hbf	ICE 41	Bochum Hbf towards Dortmund Hbf
Duisburg Hbf towards München Hbf	ICE 42	Bochum Hbf towards Münster Hbf, Recklinghausen Hbf or Dortmund Hbf
Duisburg Hbf towards Basel SBB	ICE 43	Bochum Hbf towards Hamburg-Altona
Duisburg Hbf towards Stuttgart Hbf	ICE 47	Gelsenkirchen Hbf towards Münster Hbf
Duisburg Hbf towards Köln Hbf	IC 51	Bochum Hbf towards Gera Hbf
Duisburg Hbf towards Oberstdorf	IC 55 Allgäu	Bochum Hbf towards Dortmund Hbf
Duisburg Hbf towards Graz Hbf	ICE 62	Gelsenkirchen Hbf towards Münster Hbf
Duisburg Hbf towards Innsbruck Hbf	ICE 62 Bodensee	Bochum Hbf towards Dortmund Hbf
Düsseldorf Hbf towards Wien Hbf	ICE 91	Bochum Hbf towards Dortmund Hbf
Preceding station		Following station
Duisburg Hbf towards Köln Hbf	FLX 20	Gelsenkirchen Hbf towards Hamburg Hbf
Duisburg Hbf towards Aachen Hbf	FLX 30	Dortmund Hbf towards Leipzig Hbf
Preceding station	National Express Germany	Following station
Mülheim (Ruhr) Hbf towards Aachen Hbf	RE 1 (NRW-Express)	Wattenscheid towards Hamm (Westf) Hbf
Mülheim (Ruhr) Hbf towards Cologne/Bonn Airport	RE 6 (Rhein-Weser-Express)	Wattenscheid towards Minden
Mülheim (Ruhr) Hbf towards Düsseldorf Hbf	RE 11 (Rhein-Hellweg-Express)	Wattenscheid towards Kassel-Wilhelmshöhe
Preceding station	DB Regio NRW	Following station
Mülheim (Ruhr) Hbf towards Düsseldorf Hbf	RE 2	Gelsenkirchen Hbf towards Osnabrück Hbf
Mülheim (Ruhr) Hbf towards Mönchengladbach Hbf	RE 42	Gelsenkirchen Hbf towards Münster Hbf
Essen West towards Wesel	RE 49	Essen-Steele towards Wuppertal Hbf
Mülheim (Ruhr) Hbf towards Aachen Hbf	RB 33	Essen-Steele Terminus
Terminus	RB 40	Essen-Kray Süd towards Hagen Hbf
Preceding station	NordWestBahn	Following station
Essen West towards Borken (Westf) or Coesfeld (Westf)	RE 14	Terminus
Preceding station	VIAS	Following station
Terminus	RE 16	Wattenscheid towards Iserlohn
Preceding station	Rhine-Ruhr S-Bahn	Following station
Essen West towards Solingen Hbf	S1	Essen-Steele towards Dortmund Hbf
Terminus	S2	Essen-Kray Nord towards Dortmund Hbf
Essen West towards Oberhausen Hbf	S3	Essen-Steele towards Hattingen (Ruhr) Mitte
Essen Süd towards Köln-Nippes	S6	Terminus
Essen West towards Haltern am See or Recklinghausen Hbf	S9	Essen-Steele towards Hagen Hbf
Preceding station	Rhine-Ruhr Stadtbahn	Following station
Philharmonie towards Messe West-Süd Gruga	U11	Hirschlandplatz towards Buerer Straße
Bismarckplatz towards Margarethenhöhe	U17	Hirschlandplatz towards Karlsplatz
Bismarckplatz towards Mülheim (Ruhr) Hbf	U18	Hirschlandplatz towards Berliner Platz
Location

Essen Hauptbahnhof (German for "Essen main station") is a railway station in the city of Essen in western Germany. It is situated south of the old town centre, next to the A 40 motorway. It was opened in 1862 by the Bergisch-Märkische Eisenbahn. However, the station was not the first in Essen: as the station called Essen (today Essen-Altenessen) on the Köln-Mindener Eisenbahn was opened in 1847.

The station suffered extensive damage in World War II and was almost completely rebuilt in the 1950s and 1960s. During the following years, the Essen Stadtbahn and the A 40 were other construction projects affecting the station. Today it is an important hub for local, regional and long-distance services, with all major InterCityExpress and InterCity trains, as well as RegionalExpress and Rhein-Ruhr S-Bahn services calling at the station.

Trains of all kinds call at the station, from long distance to local services. It used to be one of the Metropolitan stops on the Hamburg to Cologne line before the service was discontinued in 2002. There are night services by EuroNight trains to cities such as Moscow and Brussels, and DB NachtZug trains to Zurich and Vienna, among others.

Some 400 trains pass through the station each day, making Essen Hauptbahnhof the third busiest railway station in the Ruhr Area after Dortmund Hauptbahnhof and Duisburg Hauptbahnhof.

== Station facilities ==
Essen Hauptbahnhof is a "separation" station, where trains divide to run on several different routes. Its platforms have individual platform canopies. In addition to through platforms, the station has some bay platforms for trains on the line towards Gelsenkirchen and Münster and lines to Hagen and Borken.

A centrally located concourse runs across and under the railway tracks on two levels, and are connected by stairs and escalators. On the lower level there are shops and, south of the entrance hall, a travel centre; on both levels there are restaurants. The lower level allows passage from central Essen to the north of the station to Essen-Südviertel in the south. The upper level serves as the circulation level giving access to the tracks. Direct access to the platforms is possible via lifts from the lower level. A pedestrian tunnel at the eastern end of the platforms also allows passage from central Essen to the Südviertel district.

Below the station is an underground station on two levels (one a circulation level and below that, four platform tracks), serving the trams and the Essen Stadtbahn, which are operated by Ruhrbahn. It has an unusual appearance with its pervasive blue light.

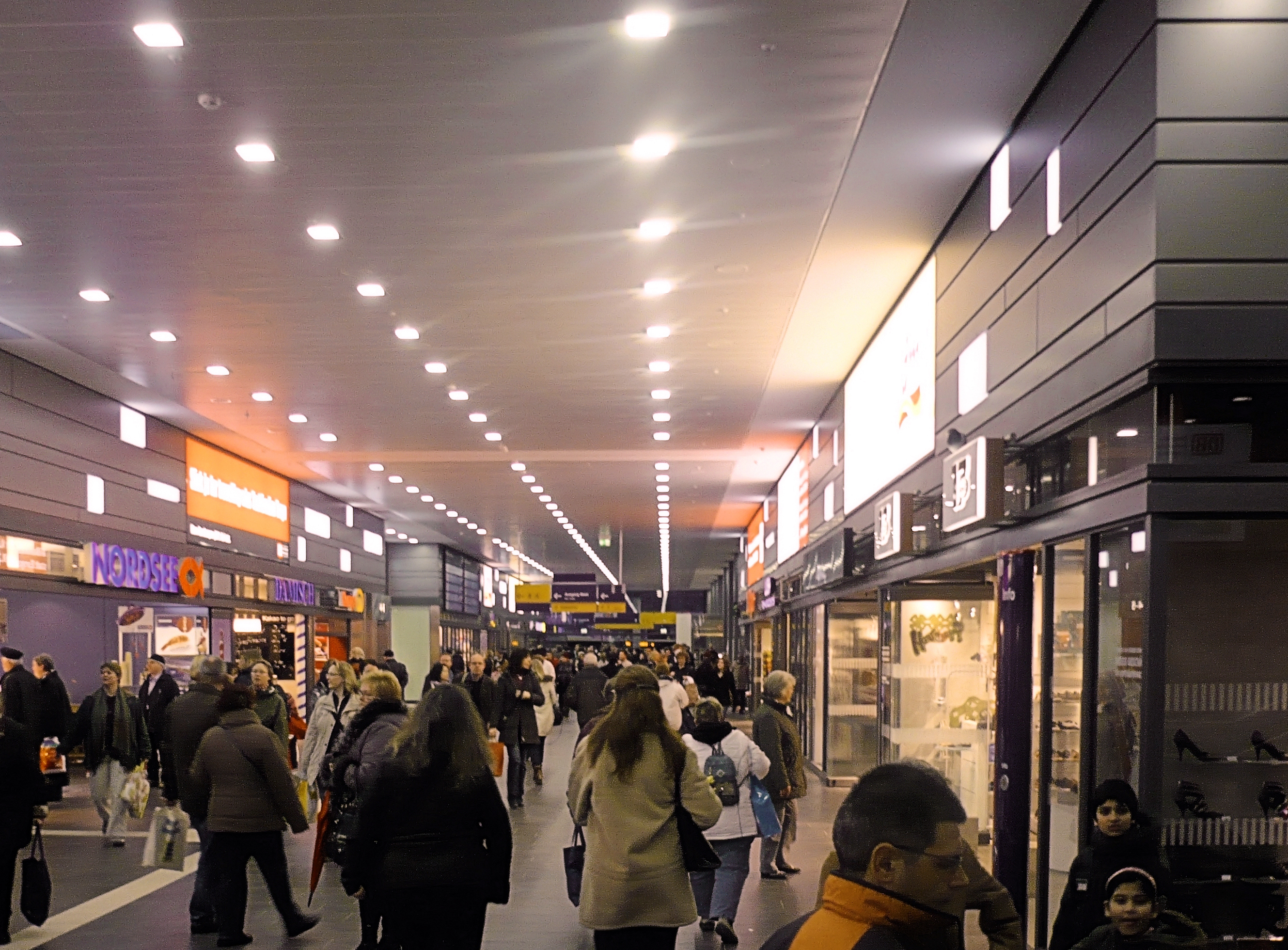
Entrance hall in 2010

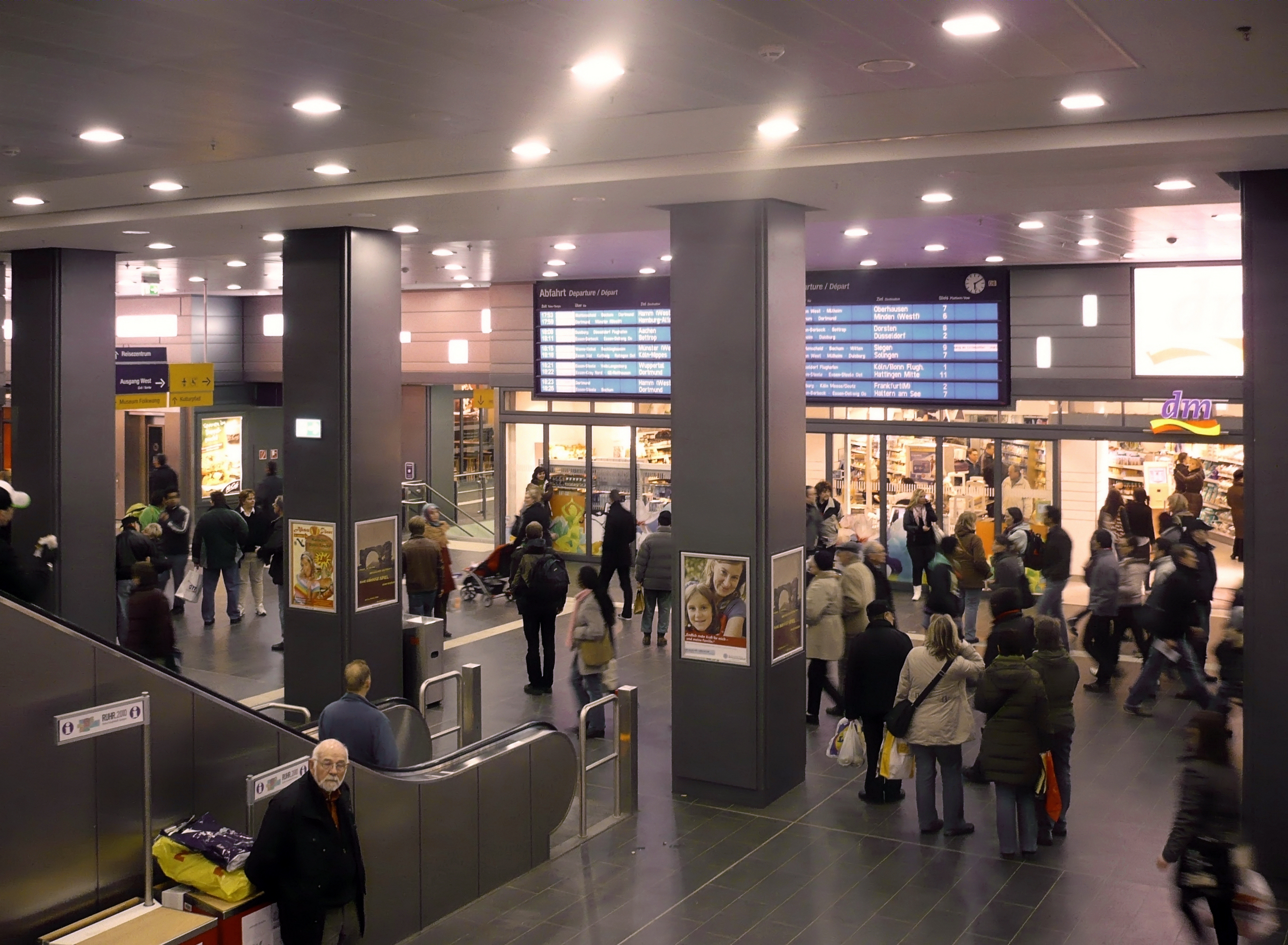
Entrance hall with display panel - 2010

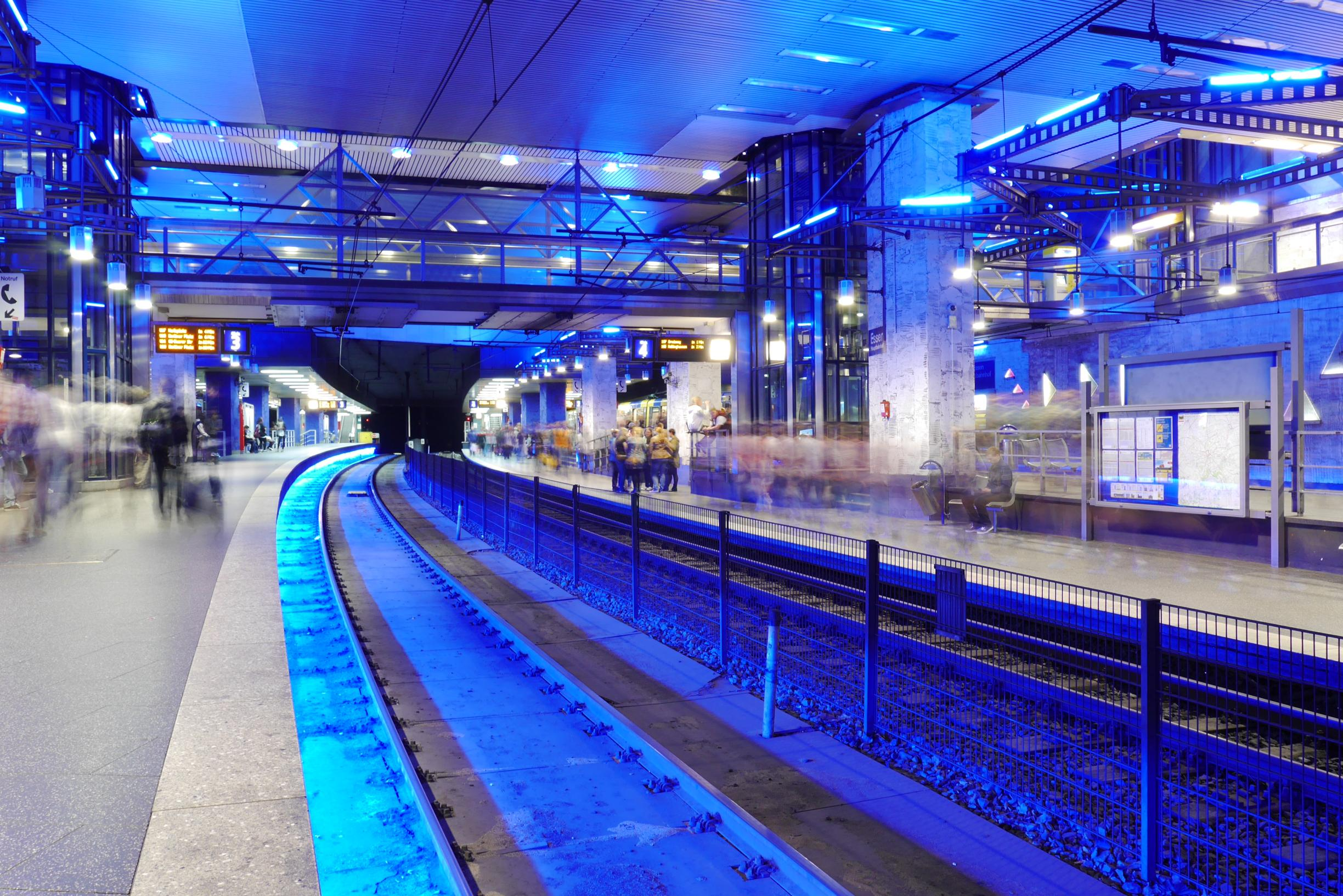
Stadtbahn station in 2014

== History ==
On 1 March 1862 the Bergisch-Märkische Railway Company (Bergisch-Märkische Eisenbahn-Gesellschaft) opened the section of the Witten/Dortmund–Oberhausen/Duisburg railway between Bochum and Mülheim an der Ruhr. The station that developed into Essen Hauptbahnhof, but was known until 1897 as Essen BM station, was opened on this line. It was not the first station in Essen. In 1846 Berge-Borbeck station (known since 1914 as Essen-Bergeborbeck) was opened on the Duisburg–Dortmund railway of the Cologne-Minden Railway Company (Cöln-Mindener Eisenbahn-Gesellschaft, CME) as the first station in the current city of Essen. In 1847, the CME opened the then major station of Essen CME (now Essen-Altenessen station) on the Duisburg–Dortmund railway (part of its trunk line).

=== The two earlier station buildings ===
==== Entrance building of 1862 ====
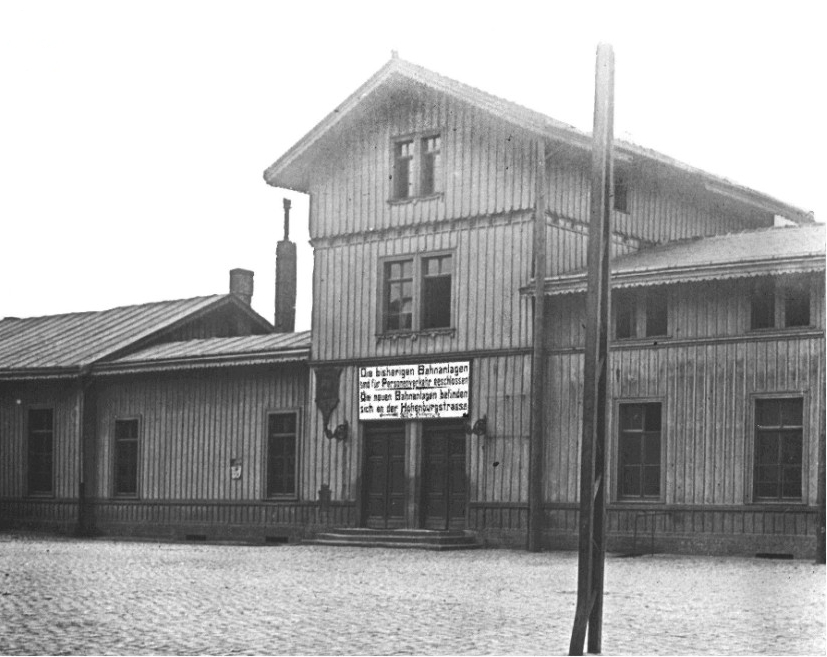
Essen BM station, 1862–1897, forerunner of the first Hauptbahnhof

The first entrance building of the station, originally called Essen BM, at today's Hachestrasse, a partly half-timbered building from 1862, was unable to cope with the rapidly growing city of Essen during the period of industrialisation in the late 19th century and was closed in 1897. The construction of a temporary wooden hall on the station roof and smaller auxiliary buildings did not provide any significant improvement for increasing passenger flows.

The Essen station mission (Bahnhofsmission, a charity providing assistance at stations) opened in 1897, making it one of the oldest in Germany.

The station tracks still crossed Kettwiger Straße at a level crossing. An elevated, grade-separated system of tracks was put into operation on 15 June 1899 so that Kettwiger Strasse now passed underneath.

==== Entrance building of Fritz Klingholz ====
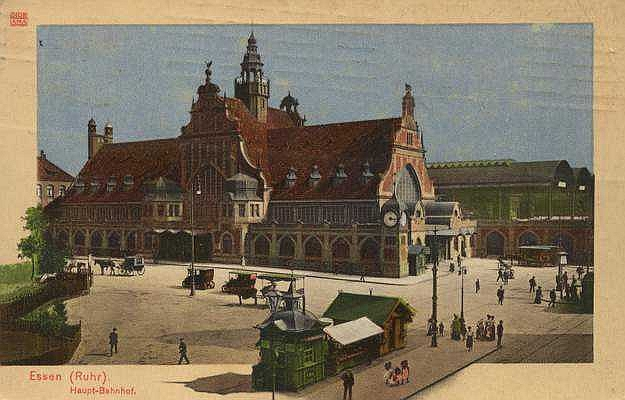
Postcard of Fritz Klingholz's station, which opened in 1902, in 1910

The wooden station building was replaced by a stately entrance building based on plans by the architect Fritz Klingholz and plans of parts by other architects. It was erected under the direction of the Prussian construction director Alexander Rüdell. Further work was carried out by the Königlichen Eisenbahndirektion zu Essen (Royal Railway Directorate at Essen) and especially the iron structures under the direction of Ministerialdirektor Schroeder. Between 1897 and 1905, the station was renamed from Essen BM to its present name of Essen Hauptbahnhof as the Bergisch-Märkische Railway Company had been dissolved and nationalised in 1886.

The basic structure of the new entrance building was an iron structure that was visible on the interior of the ceilings and walls. The reason for the erection of iron girders was the fear of mining subsidence as a result of the deep coal mining in Essen. The surrounding walls of the side aisles, the gable ends and the transverse walls of the central hall were built of bricks. The structure of the outer walls was made from Lauterecken sandstone as a veneer over red brick. The gable roof was covered with interlocking tiles. The clock tower on the northwest corner of the building had an illuminated dial. The design of the building, which had a Renaissance Revival style with Gothic Revival elements, primarily catered for its transport function. All routes for passengers and luggage were on one level, with a passenger tunnel leading to the platforms. The entrance and exit areas in the station building were clearly separated. The waiting rooms, equipped with a ladies' room and a non-smoking room, were located in the eastern wing of the building. The walls of the waiting rooms for the first and second class passengers were two metres high with red-brown and dark green tiles, while those of the third and fourth class had dark yellow bricks. This station building's wing had a basement for the station management. There were also cellars under the central hall and the ticket hall, which was located in the western wing of the building. The central or main hall had a square floor plan with a side length of 18.42 metres. An externally accessible staircase on the eastern side of the building led to the upper attic and to the extended attic, both of which were used by the railway company. The stairs also reached the attic.

Platform 1 had its own platform canopy. The two island platforms, on the other hand, were spanned by a two-span train shed, the construction of which was carried out by the August Klönne company of Dortmund. The train shed was 130 m-long, 10.7 m-high and was carried by arch trusses with a span of 21.33 m on cast iron columns spaced 8.6 m apart. Another, southern platform had a barrel roof arranged at right angles to the track.

The station was completed in December 1902. On the platform there was a branch of the main post office, including a telegraph office, and on the northern station forecourt there was a stopping place for cabs. By 1930, the Kettwiger Straße underpass had been widened with the installation of an extra span.

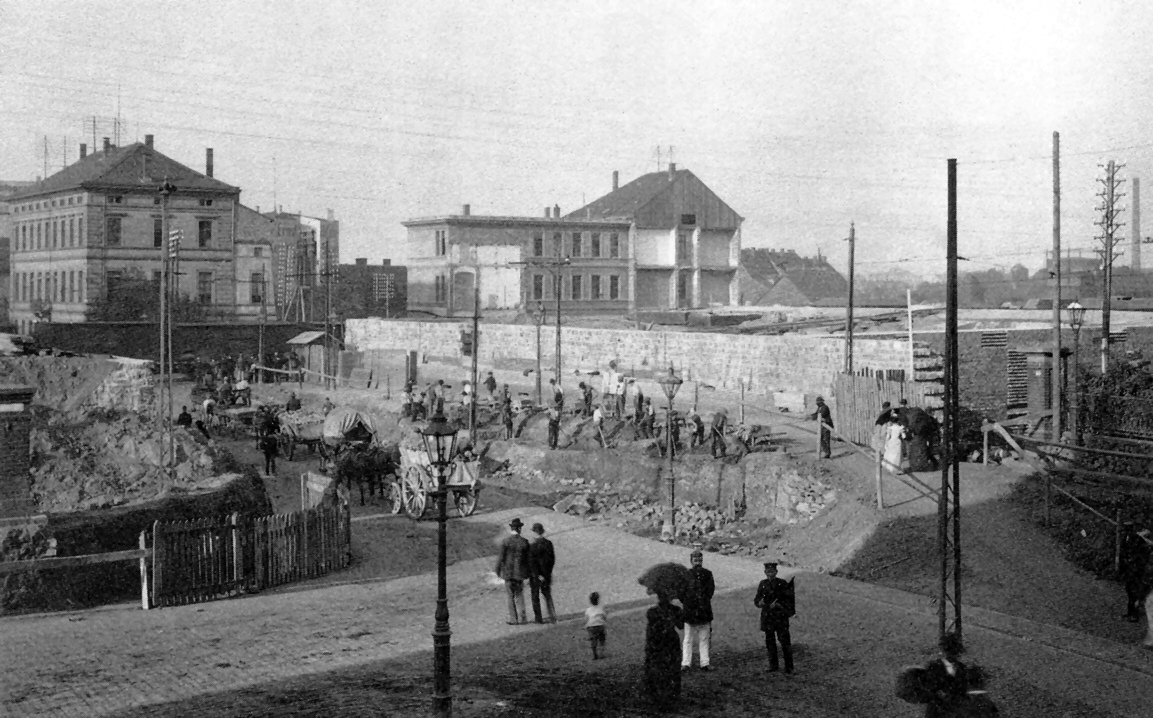
View from Freiheit: The underpass of the station was built around 1900 to enable grade-separated tracks

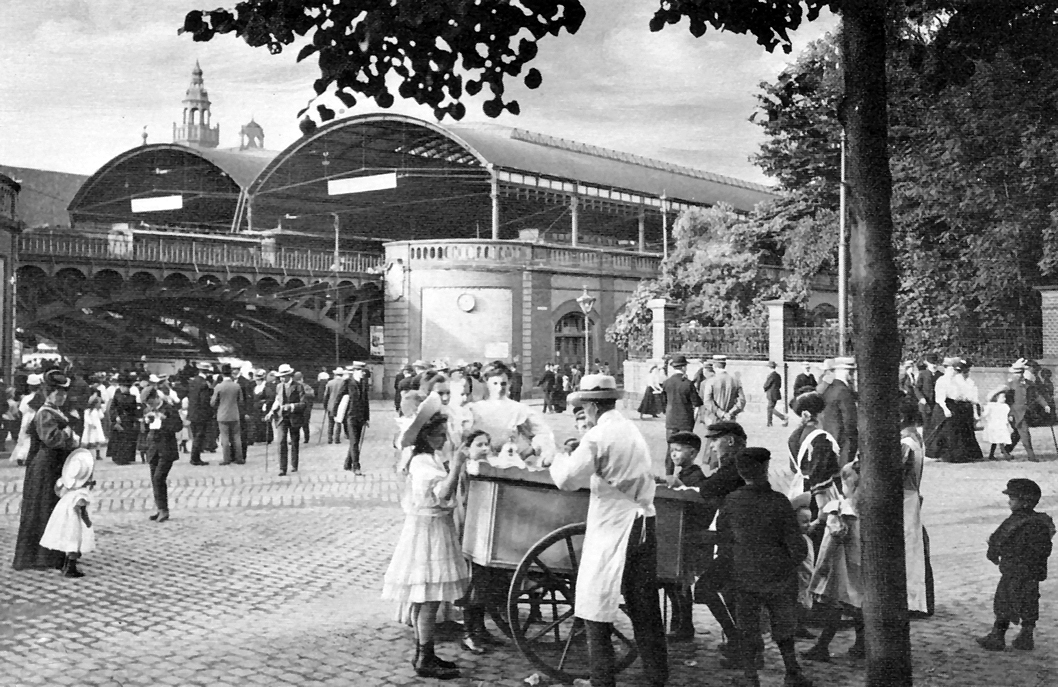
Same view with the completed station area around 1910

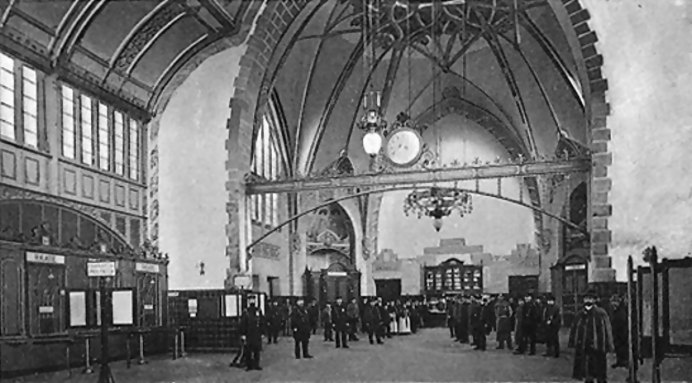
View from the ticket office to the central hall around 1905

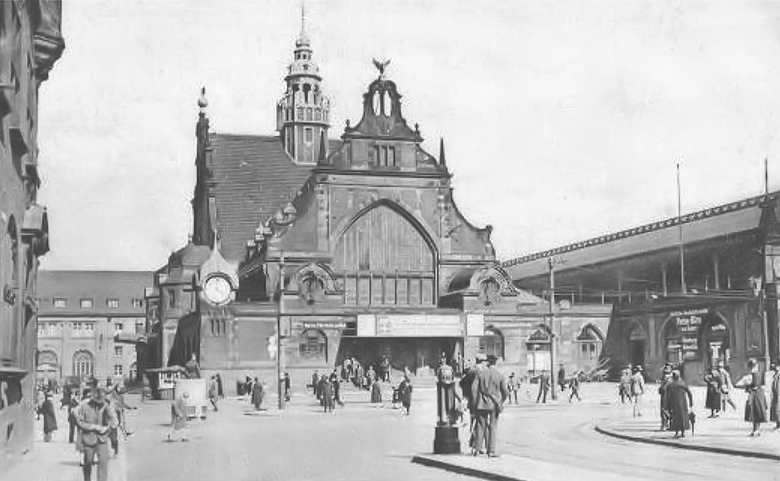
View from the west with clock tower around 1916

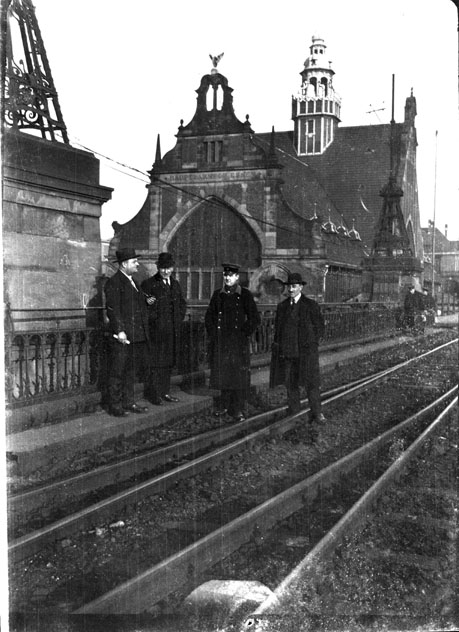
Track 1 with the station in the background

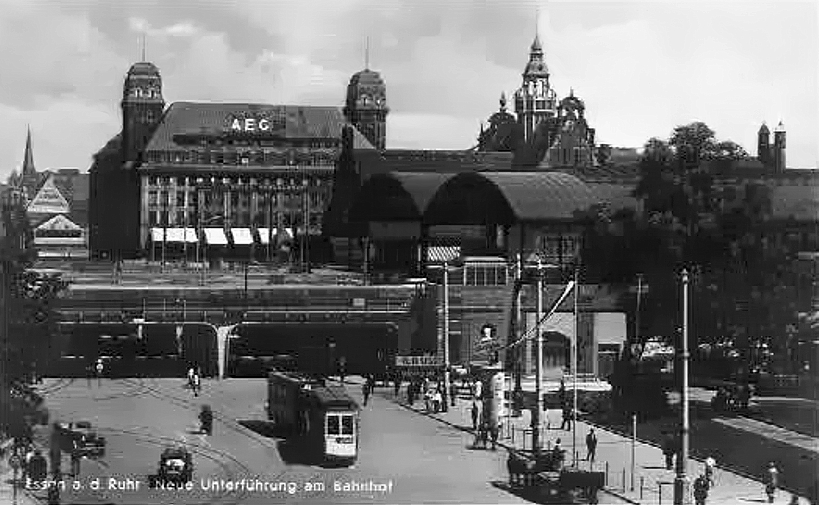
View from the south after 1932 after the underpass had been widened

=== First World War ===
At the outbreak of the First World War, many troop transport trains ran through the station in August 1914 and continued west to the front. The trains stopped briefly and the soldiers were given refreshments.

A help centre had been set up in the main station by the Red Cross to receive those arriving by the hospital trains. Two hospital trains commuted between the Western Front and the Ruhr to bring the wounded home between 1914 and 1918. The first train arrived at Essen Hauptbahnhof with around 300 wounded troops on 30 August 1914. By the end of the war, around 150,000 wounded had reached Essen. The train, the Julius von Waldthausen, named after a member of a patrician family from Essen, had 25 wagons hauled by a Prussian P 8.

The nail man Schmied von Essen (blacksmith of Essen) by the Berlin sculptor, Ludwig Nick (1873–1936), was erected on 25 July 1915 in a pavilion on the station forecourt designed by Essen architect Edmund Körner. The figure was considered a symbol of the willingness to donate in the First World War. Anyone who paid an amount of money could hammer an iron, silver, or gold nail into the smith or one of the side panels. The blacksmith's relief was moved to the Stadtgarten (city garden) after the war and was installed in a light well in the Grugapark in 1934, where it was destroyed in an Allied air raid in World War II.

=== Occupation of the Ruhr ===
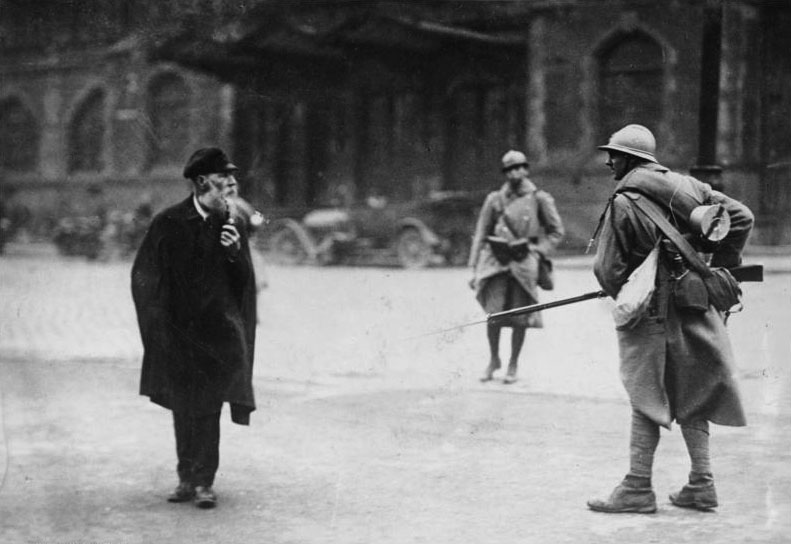
French troops during the occupation of the Ruhr in 1923 in front of the station

After the occupation of the Ruhr, a special train brought six hundred police back to Essen on 1 August 1925. They were expelled by the French in 1923 and had served in Münster and Gliwice (then called Gleiwitz) in the meantime. The returning police officers were welcomed at the station by a crowd, who accompanied them on a triumphal procession to their accommodation on Lührmannstrasse in Rüttenscheid.

=== Second World War ===
In the Second World War nine trains ran from Essen Hauptbahnhof and Segeroth station, taking a total of around 1200 Essen Jews to extermination camps in Nazi-occupied Central Europe, mostly the General Government and Protectorate of Bohemia and Moravia. The first train transported around 200 people to the Łódź Ghetto and another eight ran to the Auschwitz concentration camp and to the Theresienstadt Ghetto. Hardly anyone survived. These trains departed Essen between 27 October 1941 and 9 September 1943. Surrounded by armed guards, these trains were operated in broad daylight in front of other passengers and the rest of the train traffic was not interrupted.

The Essen station mission, like the other station missions, was suppressed during the Second World War.

Allied air raids in 1944 and 1945 destroyed Fritz Klingholz's station building, along with the two-span train shed.

=== Postwar period ===
After the war, the station was replaced with a new building in the typical style of the 1950s, partly designed by the architects Kurt Rasenack and Bernd Figge. The entrance hall that was completed on 15 November 1959 no longer exists. The west wing of the north entrance was adorned with a distinctive cafe in a glass rotunda, which was originally occupied by the station cafe and was most recently a travel agency. A curved roof allowed light to fall on the northern entrance hall. However, this was replaced later by a larger, prefabricated flat roof. This meant, in combination with the later installation of additional shops, that the station lost its former spaciousness and openness.

=== 2008–2010 reconstruction ===
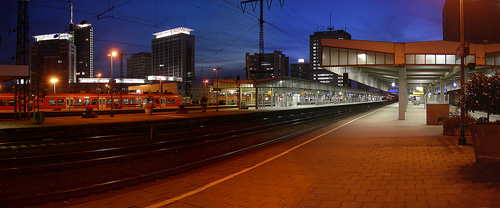
Part of the track field in 2007

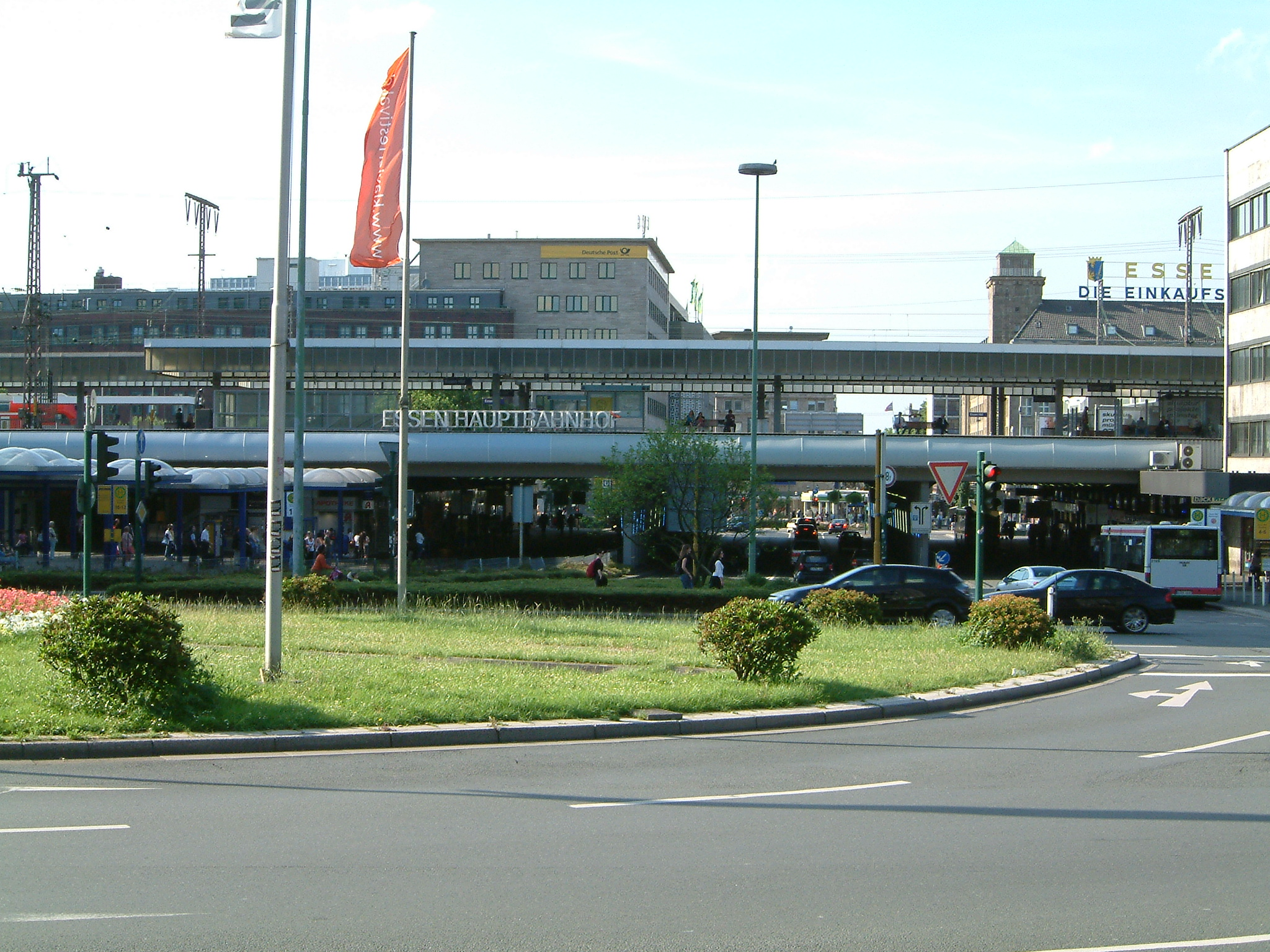
Southern entrance in 2007

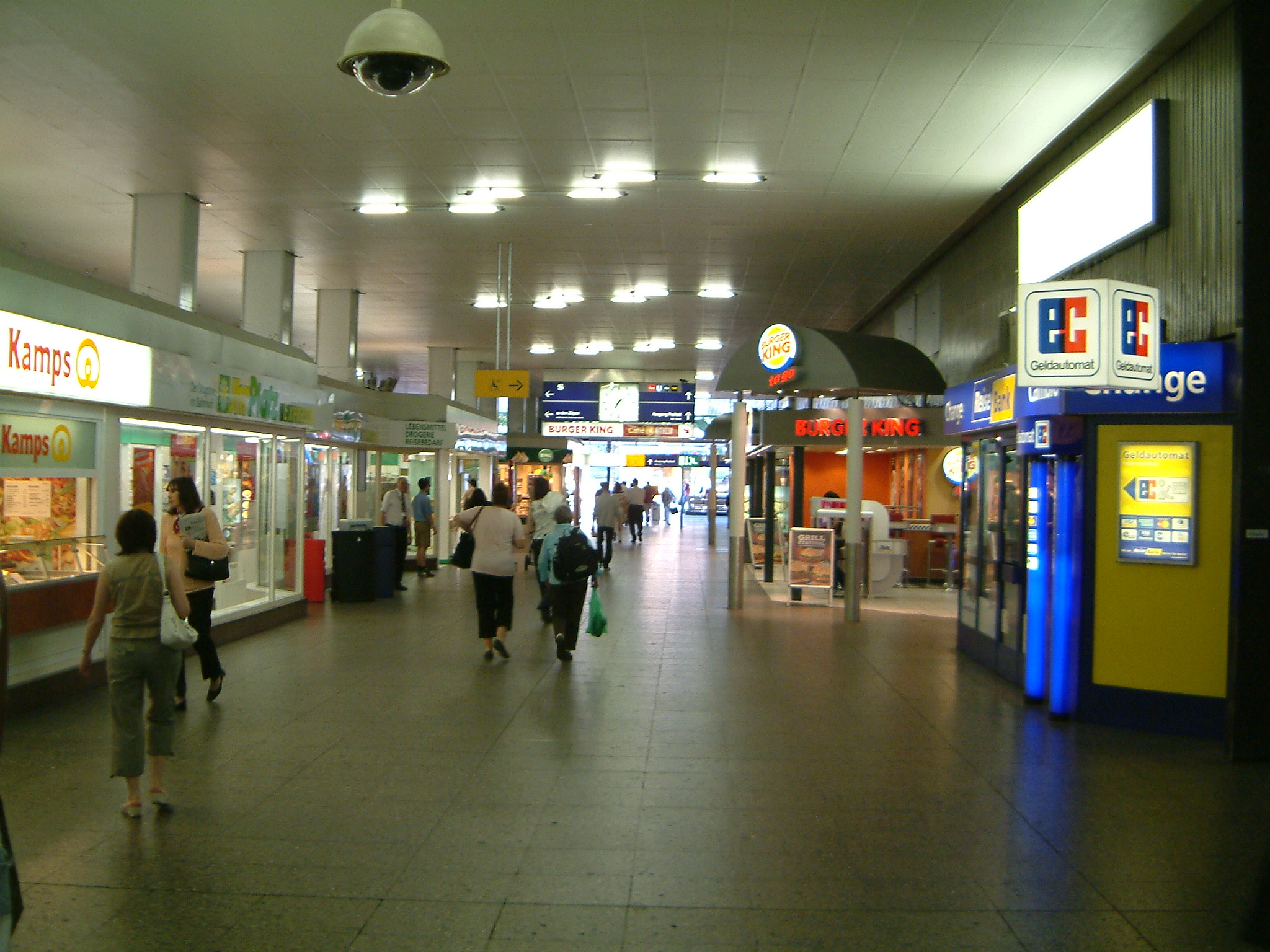
Entrance hall in 2007

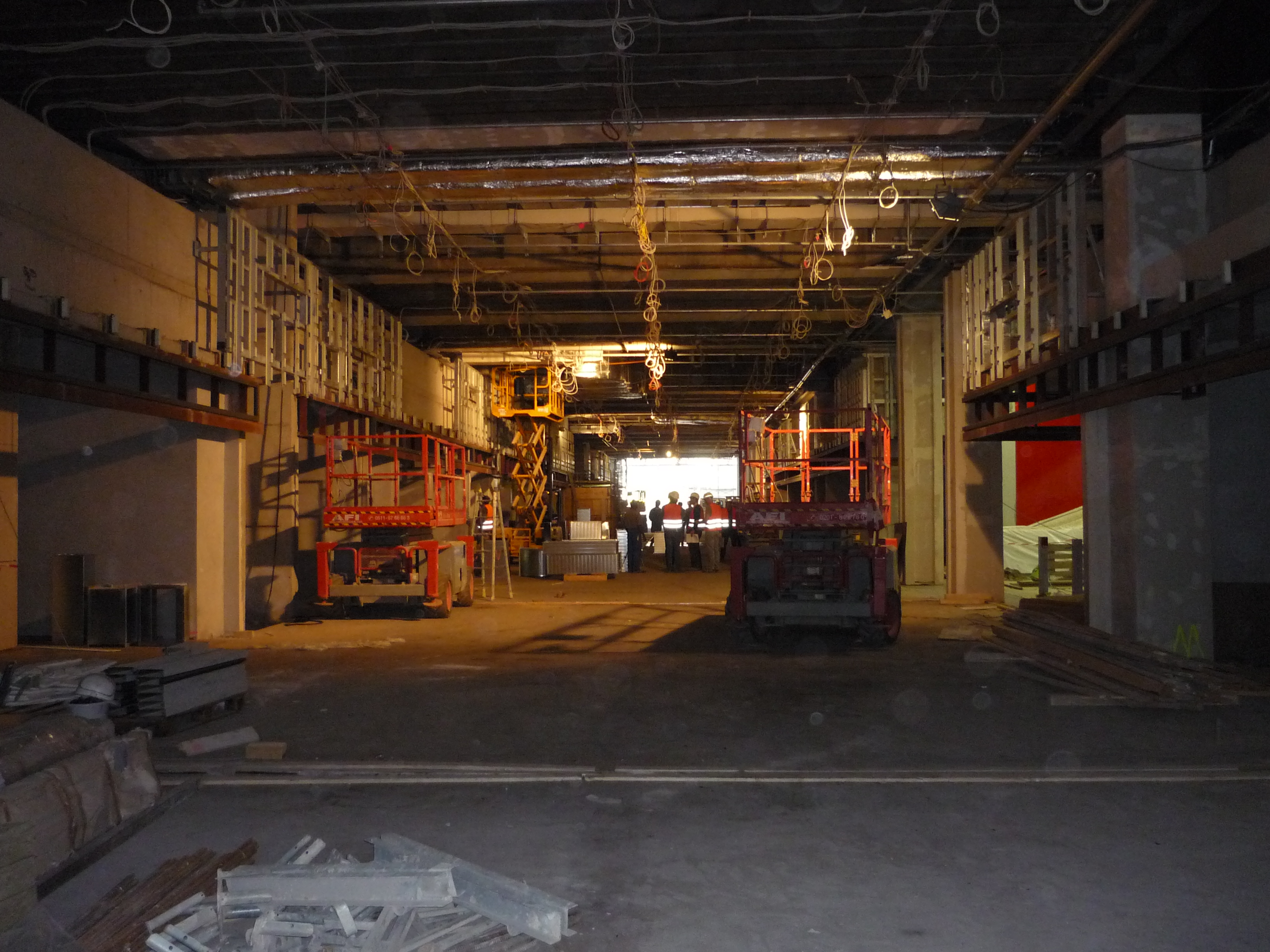
Entrance hall during reconstruction in September 2009

The groundbreaking ceremony for reconstruction of the station was held in September 2008. Prior to this Essen Hauptbahnhof was crowded and dilapidated. Since only a few expansion options were available, temporary relocation of station operations to Essen-West was considered. Instead, it was found to be cost-effective to renovate and modernise the existing station. The state of North Rhine-Westphalia developed a funding package that provided a total of €350 million for stations in the five cities of Essen, Duisburg, Dortmund, Münster and Wuppertal. DB Station&Service intended to call tenders the first work in July 2007.

However, the actual renovation project was not a package for several cities, but only affected Essen Hauptbahnhof. This was partly a response to the need for the renovation to be completed by the middle of 2010 at the latest, as Essen was designated as one of the European Capitals of Culture for the year. The Essen council was awarded the contract to rebuild the station. The former funding gap of €18 m was jointly covered by the federal government, the state government and Deutsche Bahn. Of the total costs of around €57 m, the federal government assumed €35 m, the state of North Rhine-Westphalia €5.1 m and Deutsche Bahn almost €17 m. In addition, the then Essener Verkehrs-AG (EVAG) invested almost €5.3 m in the project.

On 11 February 2008, Essener Verkehrsgesellschaft began to rebuild the approximately one hundred metre-long passage built in 1977 at the first basement level between Willy-Brandt-Platz, which was named after him in 1994, and the street called Freiheit. It replaced the electrical systems according to new fire protection regulations and modernised the ventilation. In addition, new shops were built. From 11 August until 21 November 2008 the passage to the city centre was closed and was then modernised and reopened before work was complete. However, the underground station was always accessible via the entrance from the street of Freiheit, as it still is.

The entire concourse of the station building was gutted and rebuilt with 5,700 square metres of retail space. The facades were renovated and the main passage widened. The southern entrance was rebuilt with two glass pavilions, which now house the Deutsche Bahn travel centre and the Ruhrbahn customer service centre. The former glass cafe rotunda was demolished in 2009 and replaced by a rectangular, glass extension, which is used by a fast food restaurant. Lifts were installed on the five platforms to give them barrier-free access for the disabled. Similarly, the platform surfaces and platform canopies were repaired and the sound system and lighting were replaced. The Bahnhofsmission (station mission) was given a larger office at the taxi waiting area on the north side, outside the entrance building. There is also a "kids lounge" for children travelling alone.

The station concourse was out of use from September 2008. It was reopened to the public on 21 December 2009. The official opening took place on 16 January 2010 in the presence of Federal Minister of Transport Peter Ramsauer, Minister-President of North Rhine-Westphalia Jürgen Rüttgers, and Deutsche Bahn Chief Rüdiger Grube. During the renovation of the lobby, the platforms were only accessible via tunnels from the west (station underpass/Freiheit) and east (side entrance opposite the Haus der Technik). In addition Essener Verkehrs-AG relocated the bus stops from the underpass to the north and south exits. The then Essener Verkehrs-AG (now Ruhrbahn) opened its €7.8 m customer centre at the southern entrance on 12 April 2010. There is a photovoltaic system on the roof that can generate up to 23,300 kilowatt-hours of electricity per year. Furthermore, the two pedestrian underpasses in the east and west and the long-distance bus station in the south were renewed. In addition, the plazas north and south of the station were rebuilt. The eastern tunnel, which had been closed for the installation of a lift, was reopened in October 2011.

== Services ==
According to DB information, 123 long-distance trains, 198 local trains and 403 S-Bahn trains served the station every day in 2010.

=== Long distance trains ===
In the 2026 timetable, the following long-distance services stopped at the station:

Line	Route	Frequency
ICE 1	Hamburg-Altona – Hamburg – Essen – Duisburg – Düsseldorf – Cologne – Bonn – Koblenz – Mainz – Frankfurt Airport – Frankfurt – Würzburg – Nuremberg – Regensburg – Passau	Three times a day
ICE 10	Cologne – Düsseldorf – Duisburg – Essen – Bochum – Dortmund – Hamm – Bielefeld – Hanover – Wolfsburg – Berlin – Berlin Ostbahnhof	Hourly
ICE 14	Aachen – Cologne – Düsseldorf – Essen – Hanover – Berlin – Berlin Ostbahnhof	Every two hours
ICE 33	Westerland – Niebüll – Itzehoe – Hamburg – Bremen – Osnabrück – Münster – Gelsenkirchen – Essen – Duisburg – Düsseldorf – Cologne	1 train pair
ICE 41	Dortmund – Essen – Duisburg – Düsseldorf – Cologne – Frankfurt – Würzburg – Nuremberg – Munich	60 min
ICE 42	Hamburg-Altona – Hamburg – Bremen – Münster – Dortmund – Essen – Duisburg – Düsseldorf – Cologne – Frankfurt Airport – Mannheim – Stuttgart – Munich	120 min
ICE 43	Hamburg-Altona – Hamburg – Bremen – Osnabrück – Münster – Dortmund – Bochum – Essen – Duisburg – Düsseldorf – Cologne – Frankfurt Airport – Mannheim – Karlsruhe – Freiburg – Basel	120 min
ICE 47	Münster – Recklinghausen – Gelsenkirchen – / Dortmund – Essen – Duisburg – Düsseldorf – Cologne – Frankfurt Airport – Mannheim – Stuttgart	120 min
IC 51	Düsseldorf / Cologne – Essen – Bochum – Dortmund – Kassel – Eisenach – Erfurt – Weimar – Jena West – Jena-Göschwitz – Gera	1 train pair
ICE 55	Dortmund – Essen – Duisburg – Düsseldorf – Cologne – Bonn – Koblenz – Mannheim – Stuttgart – Ulm – Oberstdorf	1 train pair
ICE 62	Münster – Wanne-Eickel – Gelsenkirchen – Essen – Duisburg – Düsseldorf – Köln Messe/Deutz – Frankfurt Airport – Mannheim – Stuttgart – Ulm – Augsburg – Munich – Salzburg – Villach – Klagenfurt – Graz	1 train pair
ICE 62	Dortmund – Bochum – Essen – Duisburg – Düsseldorf – Köln Messe/Deutz – Frankfurt Airport – Mannheim – Heidelberg – Stuttgart – Ulm – Friedrichshafen Stadt – Lindau-Reutin – Bregenz – St. Anton – Innsbruck	1 train pair
ICE 91	Hamburg – Hamburg-Harburg – Bremen – Münster – Dortmund – Essen – Duisburg – Düsseldorf – Cologne – Bonn – Koblenz – Mainz – Frankfurt Airport – Frankfurt – Würzburg – Nuremberg – Regensburg – Passau – Linz – Vienna	Some trains
Eurostar	Paris-Nord – Brussels – Liège-Guillemins – Aachen – Cologne – Düsseldorf – (Düsseldorf Airport –) Duisburg – Essen – Dortmund	Some trains
FLX 20	Hamburg – Hamburg-Harburg – Osnabrück – Münster – Gelsenkirchen – Essen – Duisburg – Düsseldorf – Cologne	Some trains
FLX 30	Leipzig – Lutherstadt Wittenberg – Berlin Südkreuz – Berlin Hbf – Berlin-Spandau – Hannover – Bielefeld – Dortmund – Essen – Duisburg – Düsseldorf – Cologne – Aachen	Some trains

=== Regional services ===
In the 2026 timetable, the following regional services stopped at the station:

Line	Route	Frequency
RE 1 NRW-Express	Aachen – Eschweiler – Düren – Horrem – Cologne – Düsseldorf – Düsseldorf Airport – Duisburg – Mülheim – Essen – Bochum – Dortmund – Hamm	60 min
RE 2 Rhein-Haard-Express	Düsseldorf – Duisburg – Mülheim – Essen – Gelsenkirchen – Recklinghausen – Münster	60 min
RE 6 Rhein-Weser-Express	Minden – Herford – Bielefeld – Hamm – Dortmund – Essen – Mülheim – Duisburg – Düsseldorf Airport – Düsseldorf – Neuss – Cologne – Cologne/Bonn Airport	60 min
RE 11; Rhein-Hellweg-Express	Düsseldorf – Düsseldorf Airport – Duisburg – Mülheim – Essen – Dortmund – Hamm – Paderborn (– Kassel-Wilhelmshöhe)	60 min
RE 14; Emscher-Münsterland-Express	Essen – Bottrop – Gladbeck - Dorsten (– Borken / Coesfeld)	30 min (60 mins to Borken / Coesfeld)
RE 16; Ruhr-Lenne-Express	Essen – Bochum – Witten – Hagen – Iserlohn-Letmathe – Iserlohn	60 min
RE 42; Niers-Haard-Express	Münster – Haltern am See – Recklinghausen – Gelsenkirchen – Essen – Mülheim – Duisburg – Krefeld – Viersen – Mönchengladbach	60 min
RE 49; Wupper-Lippe-Express	Wesel – Oberhausen – Mülheim –Essen – Wuppertal-Vohwinkel – Wuppertal	60 mins
RB 33; Rhein-Niers-Bahn	Essen-Steele – Essen – Mülheim – Duisburg – Krefeld – Mönchengladbach – Aachen	60 mins
RB 40; Rhein-Niers-Bahn	Essen – Wattenscheid – Bochum – Witten – Wetter – Hagen	60 mins
S1	Dortmund – Bochum – Essen – Mülheim – Duisburg – Düsseldorf Airport – Düsseldorf – Hilden – Solingen	30 min (15 mins to Dortmund)
S2	Dortmund – Castrop-Rauxel – Herne – Wanne-Eickel – Gelsenkirchen – Essen	60 min
S3	Oberhausen – Mülheim – Essen – Hattingen (Ruhr) Mitte	30 min
S6	Essen – Kettwig – Ratingen Ost – Düsseldorf – Langenfeld – Leverkusen Mitte – Köln-Mülheim – Köln-Messe/Deutz – Cologne – Köln-Hansaring – Köln-Nippes (– Köln-Chorweiler – Köln-Worringen)	20 min
S9	Recklinghausen / Haltern am See – Gladbeck West – Bottrop – Essen – Essen-Steele – Velbert-Langenberg – Wuppertal-Vohwinkel – Wuppertal - Hagen	30 min Gladbeck West - Wuppertal Hbf 60 min Recklinghausen Hbf, Haltern am See, Hagen Hbf

=== Stadtbahn and Tram ===
The station is served by the following Stadtbahn and Tram services (as of 2020):

Line	Route	Frequency
U11	GE-Horst, Buerer Straße – Schloss Horst – GE-Horst, Fischerstraße – E-Karnap, Alte Landstraße – Boyer Straße – E-Karnap, Arenbergstraße – E-Altenessen, Heßlerstraße – II. Schichtstraße – Karlsplatz – Altenessen Mitte – Kaiser-Wilhelm-Park – Altenessen – Bäuminghausstraße – Bamlerstraße – Universität Essen – Berliner Platz – Hirschlandplatz – Essen Hbf – Philharmonie – Rüttenscheider Stern – Martinstraße – Messe Ost/Gruga – Essen, Messe West/Süd/Gruga	10 min
U17	E-Altenessen, Karlsplatz – Altenessen Mitte – Kaiser-Wilhelm-Park – Altenessen – Bäuminghausstraße – Bamlerstraße – Universität Essen – Berliner Platz – Hirschlandplatz – Essen Hbf – Bismarckplatz – Planckstraße – Gemarkenplatz – Holsterhauser Platz (Klinikum) – Halbe Höhe – Laubenweg – E-Margarethenhöhe	10 min
U18	Essen, Berliner Platz – Hirschlandplatz – Essen Hbf – Bismarckplatz – Savignystraße/ETEC – Hobeisenbrücke – E-Frohnhausen, Wickenburgstraße – Mülheim (Ruhr), Rhein-Ruhr-Zentrum – Rosendeller Straße – Eichbaum – Heißen Kirche – Mühlenfeld – Christianstraße – Gracht – Von-Bock-Straße – Mülheim (Ruhr) Hbf	10 min
101/106	Borbeck Germaniaplatz – Bergeborbeck Leimgartsfeld – Bergeborbeck station – Helenenstraße – Berliner Platz – Rheinischer Platz – Rathaus Essen – Essen Hbf – Rüttenscheider Stern – Holsterhauser Platz – Hobeisenbrücke – Alfred-Krupp-Schule – Essen West station – Helenenstraße	10 min
103	Dellwig Wertstraße – Essen-Dellwig station – Gerschede – Borbeck Germaniaplatz – Essen-Borbeck station – Schloss Borbeck – Essen-Borbeck Süd station – Helenenstraße – Berliner Platz – Rheinischer Platz – Rathaus Essen – Essen Hbf	10 min
105	Frintrop Unterstraße – Bedingrade – Abzweig Aktienstraße – Essen-Borbeck Süd station – Helenenstraße – Berliner Platz – Rheinischer Platz – Rathaus Essen – Essen Hbf – Essen Süd station – Bergerhausen – Rellinghausen Finefraustraße	10 min
107	Gelsenkirchen Hauptbahnhof – Heinrich-König-Platz – Musiktheater – Gelsenkirchen-Feldmark – Essen-Katernberg – Essen Zollverein Nord station – Zollverein – Stoppenberg – Viehofer Platz – Rathaus Essen – Essen Hbf (– Philharmonie – Rüttenscheider Stern – Martinstraße – Florastraße – Bredeney)	10 min
108	Altenessen – Viehofer Platz – Rathaus Essen – Essen Hbf – Philharmonie – Rüttenscheider Stern – Martinstraße – Florastraße – Bredeney	10 min

== See also ==
- Rail transport in Germany
- Railway stations in Germany
