= Essen-Borbeck station =

Railway station in Essen, Germany

Essen Borbeck
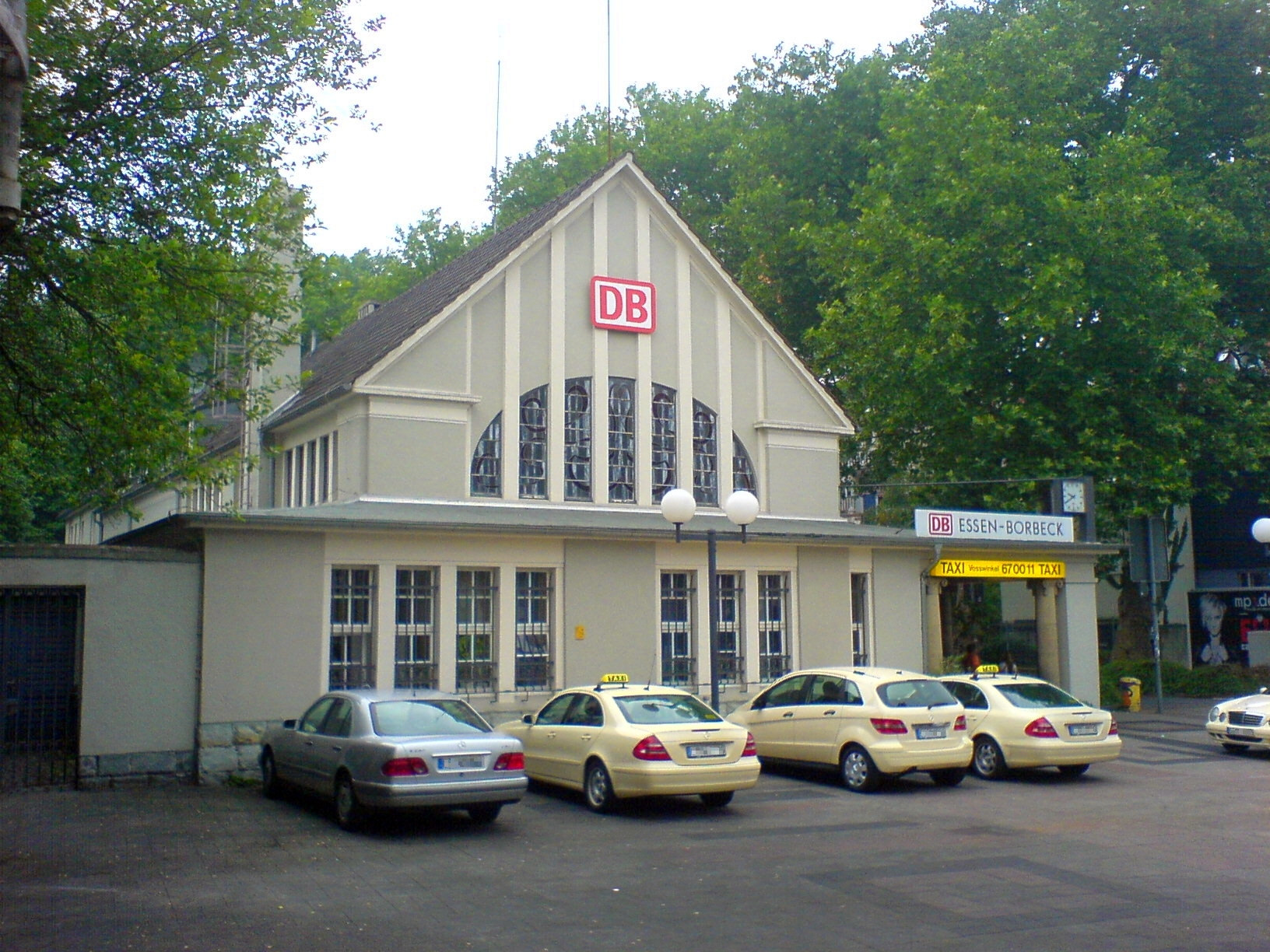

General information
- Location: Marktstraße 11, Essen, NRW; Germany
- Coordinates: 51°28′23″N 6°56′54″E
- Lines: Essen–Bottrop (KBS 423)
- Platforms: 2

Construction
- Accessible: Yes

Other information
- Station code: 1696
- DS100 code: EEBB
- Category: 4
- Fare zone: VRR: 352
- Website: www.bahnhof.de

History
- Opened: 1 March 1862

Services
Preceding station	NordWestBahn	Following station
Bottrop Hbf towards Borken (Westf) or Coesfeld (Westf)	RE 14	Essen West towards Essen Hbf
Preceding station	Rhine-Ruhr S-Bahn	Following station
Essen-Gerschede towards Haltern am See or Recklinghausen Hbf	S9	Essen-Borbeck Süd towards Hagen Hbf
Location

Essen-Borbeck is a railway station in Essen, North Rhine-Westphalia, Germany. The station is located on the Essen–Bottrop railway and is served by RE and S-Bahn services operated by NordWestBahn and Abellio Rail NRW .

== Train services ==
Special 15 minutes-tact RE14 / S9 : Gladbeck - Bottrop - Essen-Borbeck - Essen Hbf

The following services currently call at Essen Borbeck:

Series	Operator	Route	Material	Frequency
RE 14 Emscher-Münsterland-Express	NordWestBahn	Coesfeld (Westf) / Borken (Westf) - Marbeck-Heiden - Rhade - Deuten - Dorsten-Hervest - Dorsten - Feldhausen - Gladbeck-Zweckel - Gladbeck West - Bottrop Hbf - Essen-Borbeck - Essen Hbf	NWB Talent	2x per hour

== Tram service ==
- 103 at 10-minute intervals.

== Bus services ==
It is served by routes 140, 143, 160, 170, 185 and 186 at 20-minute intervals, operated by Ruhrbahn.
