= Mülheim-Heißen–Oberhausen-Osterfeld Nord railway =

Railway line in Germany

Mülheim-Heißen–Oberhausen-Osterfeld Nord

Overview
- Line number: 2182 Mülheim-Heißen–Schönebeck; 2280 (Essen West–)Schönebeck–Frintrop; 2261 Frintrop–OB-Osterfeld Nord
- Locale: North Rhine-Westphalia, Germany

Service
- Route number: 423, 450.9

Technical
- Line length: 10 km (6.2 mi)
- Track gauge: 1,435 mm (4 ft 8 1/2 in) standard gauge
- Electrification: 15 kV/16.7 Hz AC overhead catenary
- Operating speed: 80 km/h (50 mph)

The Mülheim-Heißen–Oberhausen-Osterfeld Nord railway is a line that formerly ran continuously in the western Ruhr region from Heißen (now a district of Mülheim an der Ruhr) to Osterfeld (now part of Oberhausen) in the German state of North Rhine-Westphalia.

Several sections have been closed, leaving two sections, which are now used as parts of other routes. Between Essen-Borbeck and Essen-Dellwig Ost it is used by line S9 of the Rhine-Ruhr S-Bahn and the Regional-Express service RE 14, Der Borkener.

== History ==
The line was built by the Rhenish Railway Company (German: Rheinische Eisenbahn-Gesellschaft, RhE) as a connecting line between Heißen station on its Ruhr line (Osterath–Dortmund Süd) and RhE Osterfeld (now Oberhausen-Osterfeld Nord) station on its North Sea line (Duisburg–Quakenbrück, opened on 1 December 1872 initially for freight from Heißen to Frintrop. On 1 July 1879, the whole route to North Osterfeld was opened for passenger operations.

== Closures ==
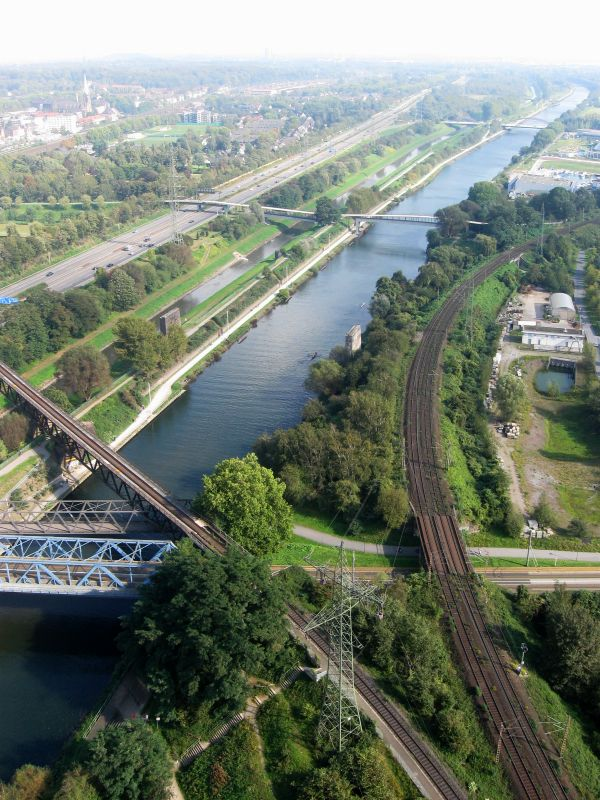
The Heißen–Osterfeld Nord line once joined the Duisburg–Bottrop Nord line here (to the left) with the Duisburg–Bottrop Süd line (to the right) on its own bridge (Rhine-Herne Canal, Emscher). At a triangular junction there was a connection to the Gutehoffnungshütte works; the bridge piers are visible in the center.

During the Second World War, on 27 March 1945 the bridges over the Emscher and the Rhine-Herne Canal were blown up and passenger services were abandoned on the entire line. The footings of the bridges over the Rhine–Herne Canal are still visible.

The section between Osterfeld junction (old) and Osterfeld Nord was not restored to operation and it was formally closed on 16 March 1967. The line was connected on the south side of the Rhine–Herne Canal with the Duisburg–Quakenbrück railway, creating the current Osterfeld junction.

After the Second World War, passenger services were restored between Mülheim-Heißen and Schönebeck junction between 1946 and 1948; the last freight train ran on 28 May 1967, two years later the line was finally decommissioned on 1 May 1969.

== Current situation ==
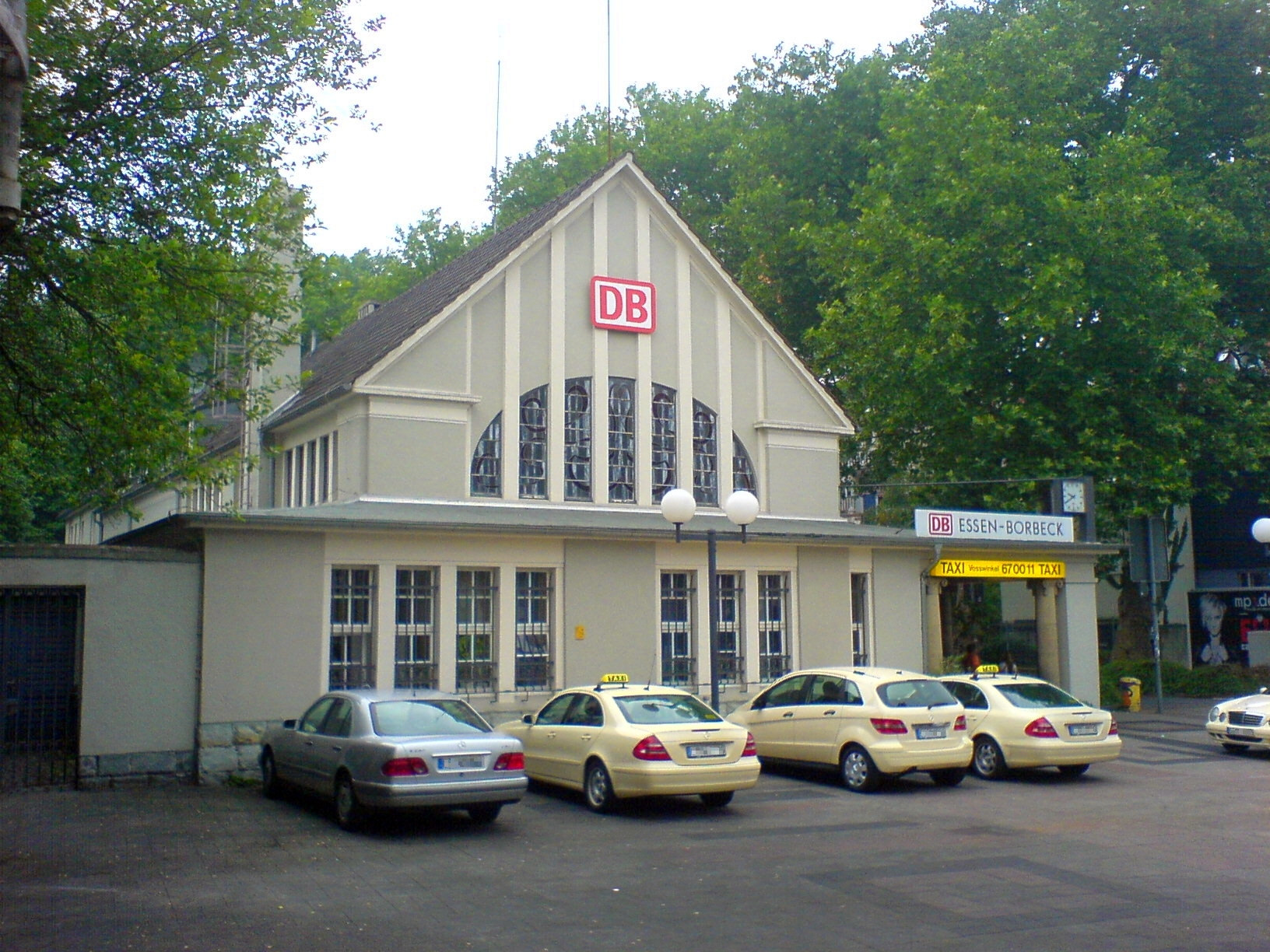
Essen-Borbeck station

Today, a 2.5 km long section of the line is open for freight traffic only and used a 4 km long section is used for passenger operations.

In 1976, the double-track line between Osterfeld junction and Essen-Frintrop junction was electrified and now serves as a major freight route. On 1 March 1996, the connection between Essen-Frintrop and Essen-Dellwig Ost was closed and dismantled. Freight traffic from Oberhausen West has since then moved only via Prosper Levin junction and Geschede junction to Bottrop Hauptbahnhof or Bottrop Süd (bypassing Oberhausen-Osterfeld Süd marshalling yard).

The middle section between Schönebeck junction and Essen-Dellwig Ost junction was electrified in 1980 and is now classified as a double-track main line passenger railway. In the north it now connects by the single-track line (line 2248) to the Oberhausen-Osterfeld Süd–Hamm. In the south it continues as to Essen West, where it connects with the main S-Bahn line to Essen. This is also the reason why the Regional-Express service RE 14, Der Borkener runs to and from the S-Bahn platform in Essen Hauptbahnhof, because there is no rail connection to the main line track. Only the S-Bahn services S 1 and S 3 services, running on the main line stop at the Essen-Frohnhausen station, because even though the line passed in the middle between the two platforms, it has no access to these platforms.

Between Essen-Borbeck and Essen-Dellwig Ost, the line it is used by line S 9 at thirty-minute intervals between Gladbeck and Wuppertal Hauptbahnhof and by Regional-Express service RE 14, Der Borkener, at thirty intervals between Essen and Dorsten. Special 15 minutes tact RE14 / S9 Gladbeck - Bottrop - Essen-Borbeck - Essen Hbf - Essen-Steele
