= Essen-Horst station =

Railway station in Essen, Germany

Essen Horst
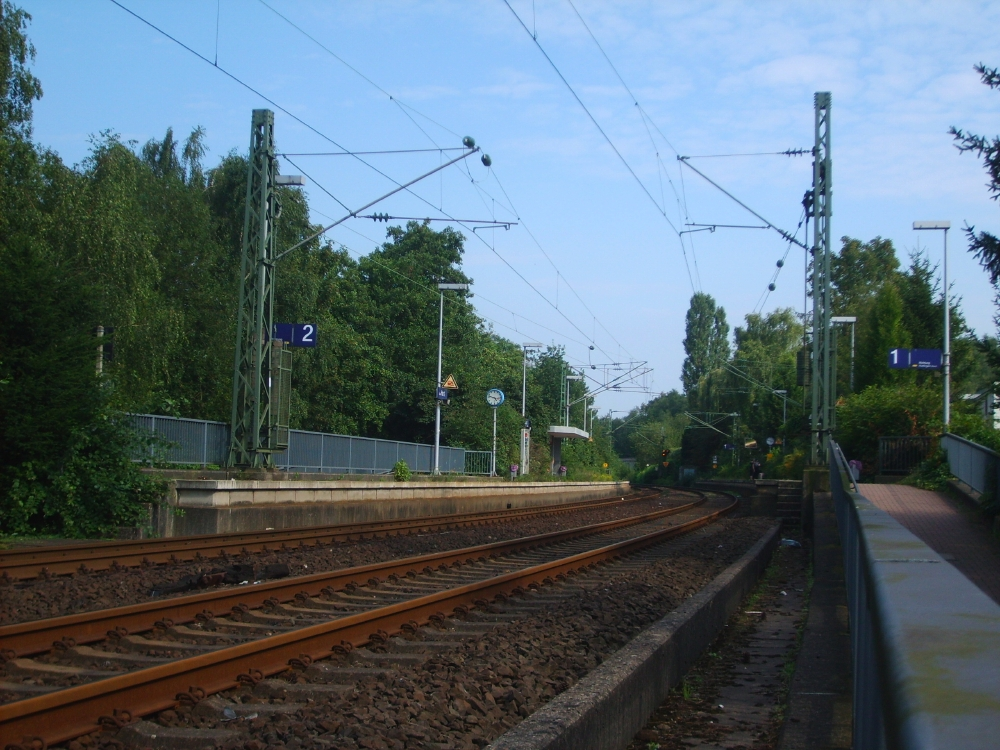

General information
- Location: Fleherweg 1, Essen, NRW; Germany
- Coordinates: 51°25′52″N 7°06′10″E
- Lines: Essen–Bochum (KBS 450.3)

Construction
- Accessible: Yes

Other information
- Station code: 1704
- DS100 code: EEHT
- IBNR: 8006194
- Category: 6
- Fare zone: VRR: 356
- Website: www.bahnhof.de

History
- Opened: 10 May 1986

Services
Preceding station	Rhine-Ruhr S-Bahn	Following station
Essen-Steele Ost towards Oberhausen Hbf	S3	B-Dahlhausen towards Hattingen (Ruhr) Mitte
Location

Essen-Horst station is located in the district of Horst in the German city of Essen in the German state of North Rhine-Westphalia. It is on the Essen-Überruhr–Bochum-Langendreer line and is classified by Deutsche Bahn as a category 6 station. It is served by Rhine-Ruhr S-Bahn line S 3 every 30 minutes and one bus routes, 167, every 10 minutes, operated by Ruhrbahn.
