= Bochum-Dahlhausen station =

Railway station in Bochum, Germany

Bochum Dahlhausen
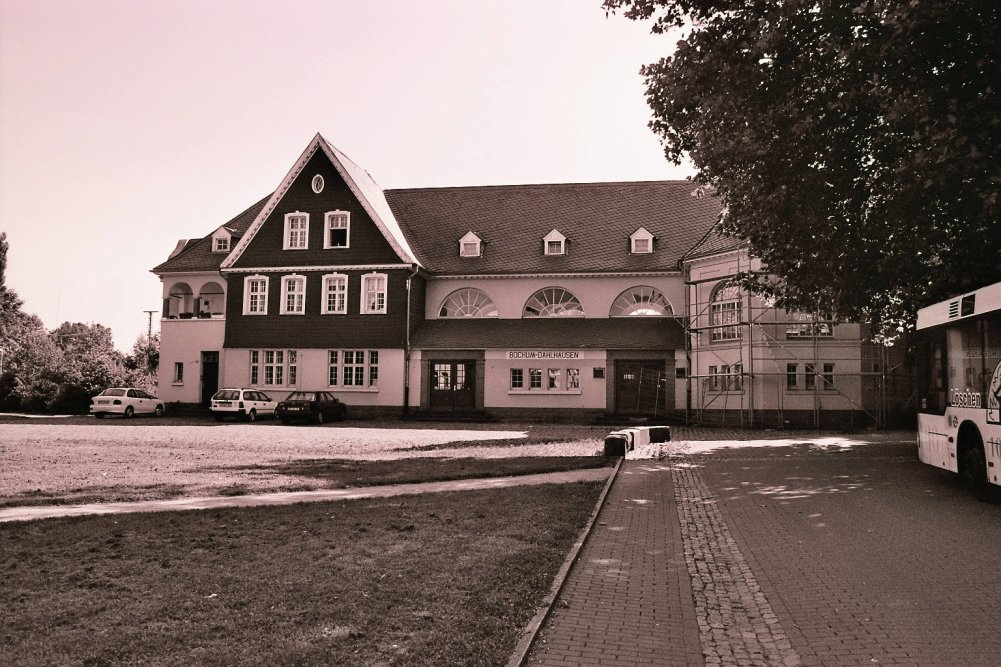

General information
- Location: Dahlhausen, NRW; Germany
- Coordinates: 51°25′35″N 7°8′32″E
- Owner: DB Netz
- Operator: DB Station&Service
- Lines: E-Überruhr–B-Langendreer (KBS 450.3)
- Platforms: 3
- Train operators: DB Regio NRW

Construction
- Accessible: Yes

Other information
- Station code: 0727
- DS100 code: EBDA
- Category: 5
- Fare zone: VRR: 366
- Website: www.bahnhof.de

History
- Opened: 21 September 1863

Services
Preceding station	Rhine-Ruhr S-Bahn	Following station
Essen-Horst towards Oberhausen Hbf	S3	Hattingen (Ruhr) towards Hattingen (Ruhr) Mitte
Location
- Location within North Rhine-Westphalia

Bochum-Dahlhausen station is located in the Dahlhausen district of Bochum in the German state of North Rhine-Westphalia. The station building dates from the time of the First World War.

== History ==
The origins of this station date back to 1863, when the Bergisch-Märkische Railway Company opened a branch line from Essen-Überruhr via Essen-Steele Ost station (originally Steele station) to Dahlhausen on 21 September 1863. This line is now considered to be part of the Wuppertal-Vohwinkel–Essen-Überruhr railway, between Überruhr and Essen-Steele Ost junction, and the Essen-Überruhr–Bochum-Langendreer railway between Essen-Steele Ost and Dahlhausen.

It was primarily used for freight, but on weekdays, passenger carriages were also attached. When the line was extended to Hattingen in 1866, a small station building was built in Dahlhausen. On 10 October 1870, the Bochum-Dahlhausen–Bochum Langendreer line (also known as the Hasenwinkel coal line) was opened as a standard-gauge railway. The communities of Dahlhausen and Linden were involved in the construction of a new station building that was completed in 1875. By this time, the Ruhr Valley Railway was already open to Hagen. Therefore, the building soon proved to be too small.

Consequently, in 1913 the Prussian state railways division at Essen (Königlich-Preußische Eisenbahndirektion Essen) began building a larger station that it had been planning since 1910 on the double-track Dahlhausen–Steele line behind a levy bank to prevent flooding by the Ruhr. During the First World War, the station was built using prisoners of war, and inaugurated on 28 February 1917.

=== Post-war period ===
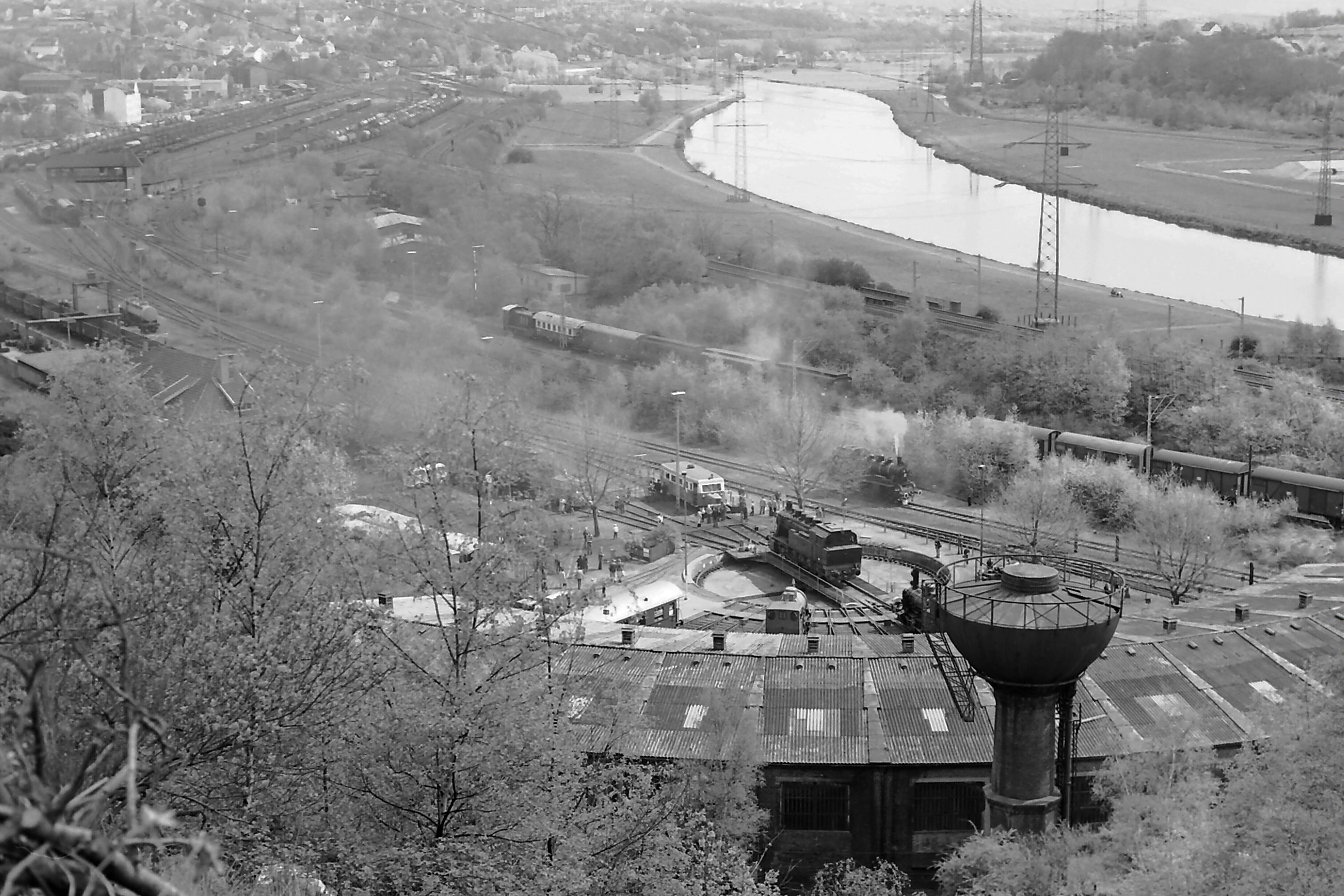
Bochum-Dahlhausen freight yard with locomotive depot, now a rail museum

With the end of the mining industry in the Ruhr valley, the Ruhr Valley Railway lost its significance. A depot that was 800 metres west of Bochum-Dahlhausen closed in 1969.

Since 1977, the former locomotive depot has housed the Bochum Dahlhausen Railway Museum, the last fully preserved steam locomotive depot in Germany.

The station building was closed in 1979, because only S-Bahn trains have operated on the line to Hattingen since 1974. Finally, in 1994, the building was heritage-listed. An investor has been allowed to restore the facade and roof in the Art Nouveau style. The main hall has been restored to the style of the 1920s. In the late 1990s, the building housed a hotel, which operated under the name of Dampflok (steam engine). It was damaged by a fire, and since then, the historic station building was unused until 2009.

Since 1 September 2009, the former station building has been operated as "One World Station", a forum for cultural activities, by a non-profit organisation, ProKulturgut.Net.

In addition to the passenger station, Dahlhausen had a marshalling yard, which is now completely dismantled. On one part of the former railway tracks, a housing estate ("Ruhrauenpark"), has been created, with the first houses going on sale in 2005.

== Future ==
It is planned to modernise and rebuild Bochum-Dahlhausen station to make it accessible for the disabled from 2014, at a cost of €4.3 million. The renovation will also improve links between buses and trains.

== Services ==
Dahlhausen station today consists of three tracks on two platforms. Tracks 1 and 2 are primarily used for normal S-Bahn traffic, while track 3 is used for museum services operated by the Bochum Dahlhausen Railway Museum.

line	line name	route
S3	S-Bahn Rhein-Ruhr	Oberhausen – Mülheim (Ruhr) – Essen – Bochum-Dahlhausen – Hattingen (Ruhr) Mitte
RTB-R	Ruhrtal	Bochum-Dahlhausen – Hattingen (Ruhr) – Witten – Hagen

In the immediate vicinity of the station building, a single-track tram line of the Bochum tram network terminates in the pedestrian zone near the station. Line 318 is the only direct tram connection from Dahlhausen to Bochum Hauptbahnhof.

line	route
318	Bochum-Gerthe Schürbankstraße – Bochum Hbf – Weitmar – Linden – Dahlhausen Bf

It is also served by four bus lines (345, 352, 359 and 390). The trams and buses are operated by BOGESTRA.
