= Essen-Steele Ost station =

Railway station in Essen, Germany

Essen Steele Ost
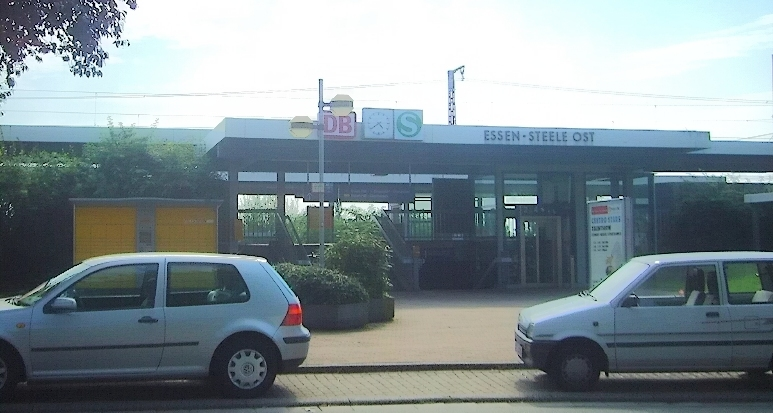

General information
- Location: Bochumer Landstr. 122a, Steele, Essen, NRW; Germany
- Coordinates: 51°26′39″N 7°05′20″E
- Lines: Dortmund–Duisburg (KBS 450.1); Essen–Bochum
- Platforms: 3

Construction
- Accessible: Yes

Other information
- Station code: 1711
- DS100 code: EESO
- IBNR: 8001913
- Category: 4
- Fare zone: VRR: 356
- Website: www.bahnhof.de

History
- Opened: 1 March 1862

Services
Preceding station	Rhine-Ruhr S-Bahn	Following station
Essen-Steele towards Solingen Hbf	S1	Essen-Eiberg towards Dortmund Hbf
Essen-Steele towards Oberhausen Hbf	S3	Essen-Horst towards Hattingen (Ruhr) Mitte
Location

Essen-Steele Ost station is located in the district of Essen-Steele in the German city of Essen in the German state of North Rhine-Westphalia. It is on the Witten/Dortmund–Oberhausen/Duisburg line and is classified by Deutsche Bahn as a category 4 station. It is served by Rhine-Ruhr S-Bahn lines S1 and S3.

== History ==
The section of the Witten/Dortmund–Oberhausen/Duisburg railway between Essen and Bochum via Wattenscheid was opened by the Bergisch-Märkische Railway Company on 1 March 1862. The then Mayor of Steele, Theodor Märcker, made a contribution to the construction of the line through the purchase of shares on condition that Steele would get a connection to the line. So finally Royal Steele (Königssteele) station was opened on the same day as the section of line at the current location of Essen-Steele Ost station. It had a freight shed and an entrance building with a station restaurant.

Carl Humann, discoverer of the Pergamon Altar and later an honorary citizen of Steele, was involved in the surveying of the line. They had to overcome, among others, the problem of the steep grade from Steele towards Essen for the still weak steam locomotives. This required large embankments to be built in Steele. As a result, the construction of a station was only possible in lower Freisenbruch. In addition, good access was possible here to mines and industry.

The opening of the Ruhr bridge in Steele on 1 June 1863 connected the Wuppertal-Vohwinkel–Essen-Überruhr railway with the new Royal Steele station. This line had been operated by the Bergisch-Märkische Railway Company to the Ruhr opposite Steele since 1854, when it had taken over the Prince William Railway Company. Another connection came on 21 September 1863 with the opening of the Ruhr Valley Railway to Bochum-Dahlhausen, which was duplicated in 1910. It served freight traffic to and from the coal mines in the Ruhr valley. Royal Steele station, which had been called just Steele since 1864, was extended by a roundhouse in 1868, which was used by rolling stock until 1935. In addition, there was a rail triangle east of the station that connected the Ruhr Valley Railway with a curve directly to the line to Bochum allowing trains to avoid the station. This line was already disused before it was finally dismantled in the 1990s. The rail triangle located at Bw (locomotive depot) Steele-Nord had been closed by 1931.

The lines were electrified by Deutsche Bundesbahn in 1957, with the exception of the line to Wuppertal. The remaining part of the station building that was built from 1862 was demolished in 1972. On its site, the current signalling centre was built. The two S-Bahn lines S1 and S3 have run to Essen-Steele Ost station since May 1974.

The opening of the viaduct between Essen-Steele station (then known as Essen-Steele West) and Überruhr on 1 February 1978 shortened the train running time between Wuppertal and Essen because previously all trains on this route had to reverse in Essen-Steele Ost station. Local transport service N9 was operated by push-pull trains because the line to Wuppertal via Steele Ost was not electrified until 2003. The tracks from Essen-Steele Ost over the Ruhr bridge are now only very rarely used by freight traffic.

In the meantime, Regional-Express service RE14 (called Der Borkener) ended in Essen-Steele Ost on platform track 2 until December 2006; since then it has ended Essen Hauptbahnhof.

=== Seven names ===
Opened with the name of Königssteele (Royal Steele), the station was renamed Steele in 1864. It was renamed Steele BM in 1879, with BM standing for the Bergisch-Märkische Railway Company. In 1893 it was renamed Steele Nord (north). In contrast, Steele Süd station was opened on the former Mülheim-Heißen–Altendorf (Ruhr) railway to the south on the right bank of the Ruhr in 1878.

In June 1926 Steele Nord was renamed Steele Hauptbahnhof (main or central station). After Steele was incorporated in the city of Essen in 1929, the station was renamed Essen-Steele in 1950. It has had its current name of Essen-Steele Ost since 27 May 1979. The station of Essen-Steele West was renamed Essen-Steele at the same time, because it is at the centre of modern Steele.

== Current situation ==
Essen-Steele Ost station is actually located in the westernmost corner of the district of Freisenbruch and is served only by lines S 1 and S 3 of the Rhine-Ruhr S-Bahn. It lies on the Witten/Dortmund–Oberhausen/Duisburg railway (timetable route 450.1) and connects to the Ruhr Valley Railway to Hattingen (Ruhr) Mitte (timetable route 450.3).

In Deutsche Bahn's directory of operating points, the station is given the abbreviation of EESO and it is classified by Deutsche Bahn as a category 4 station.

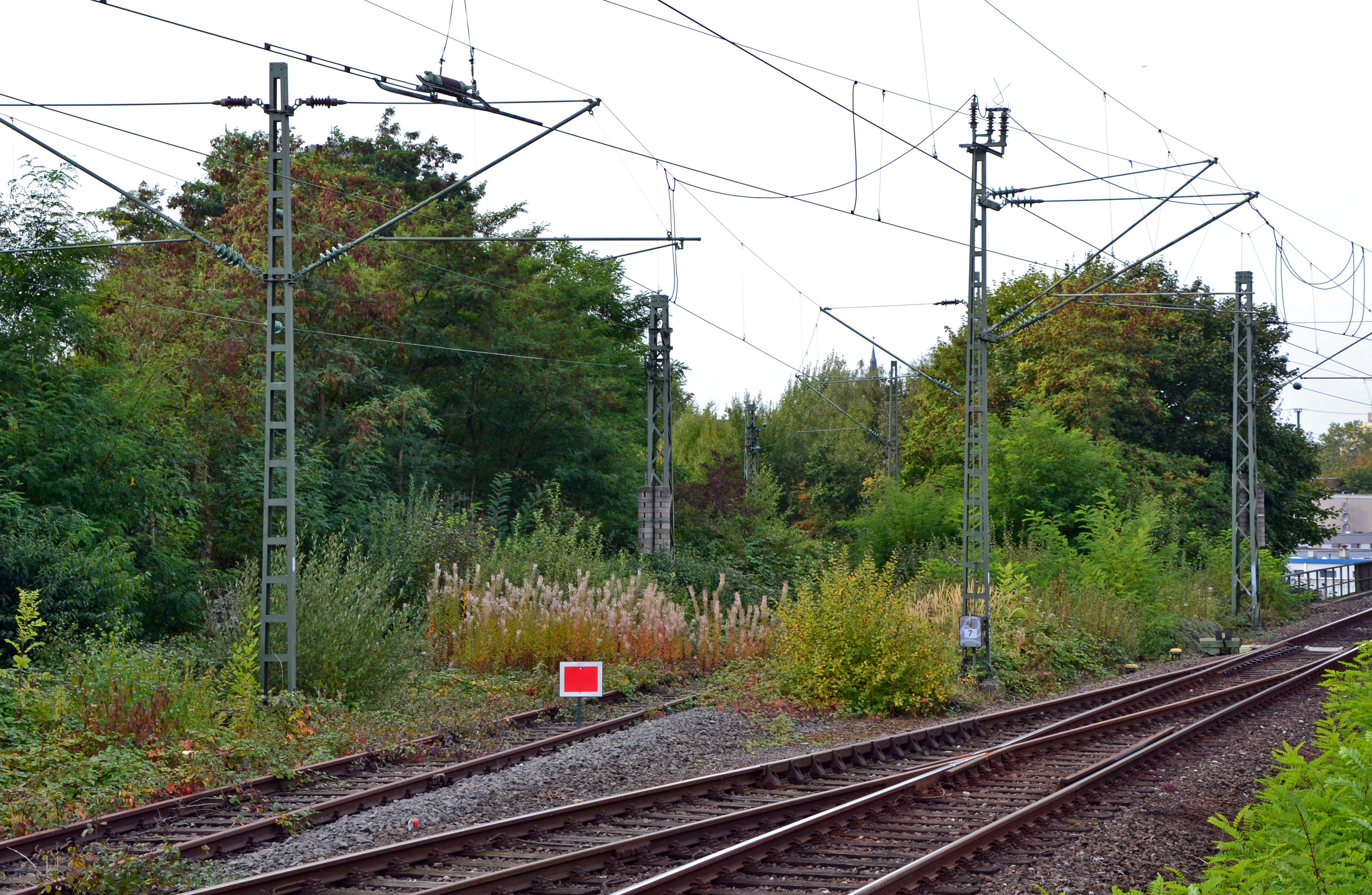
Left: old curve towards Wuppertal

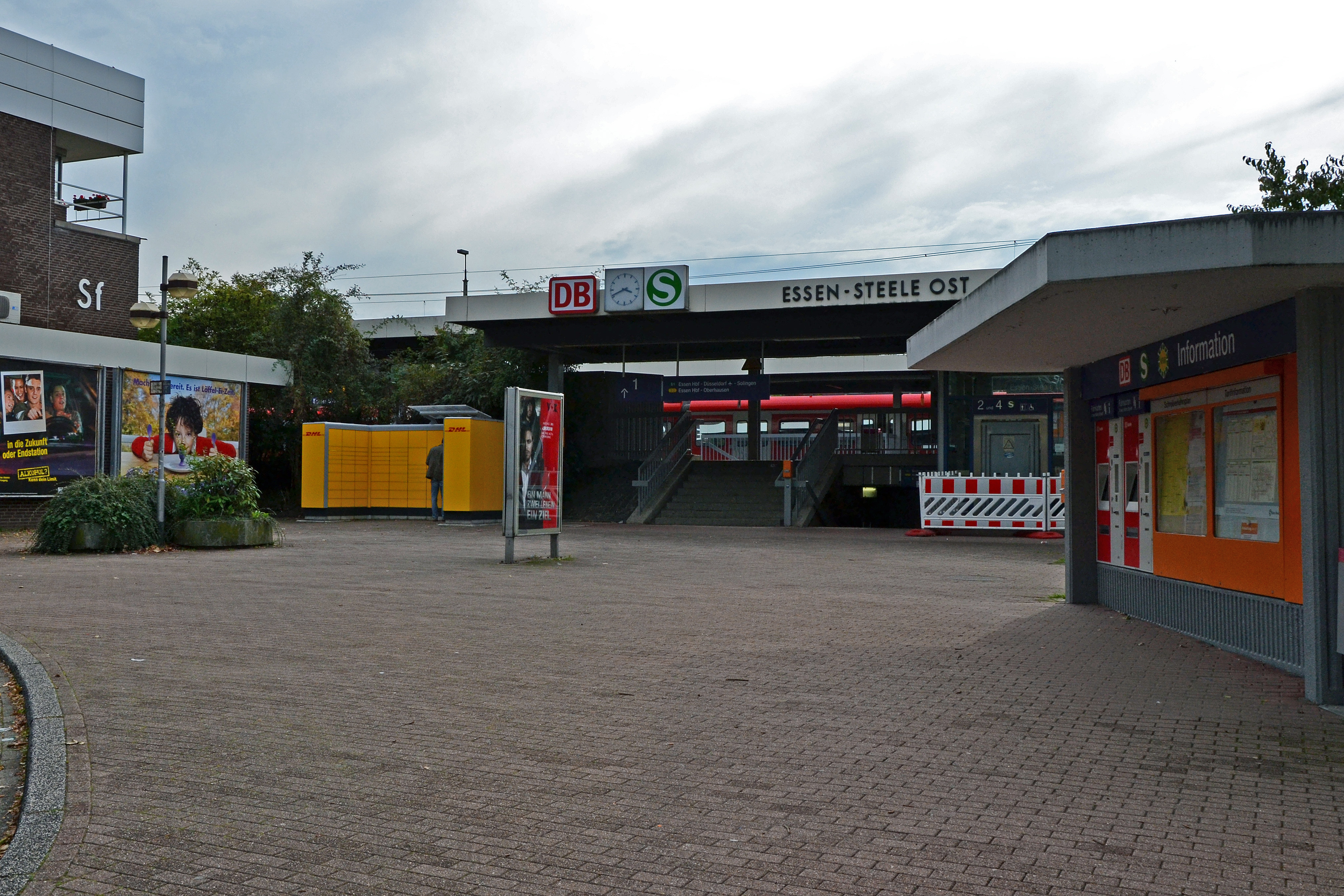
Entrance area

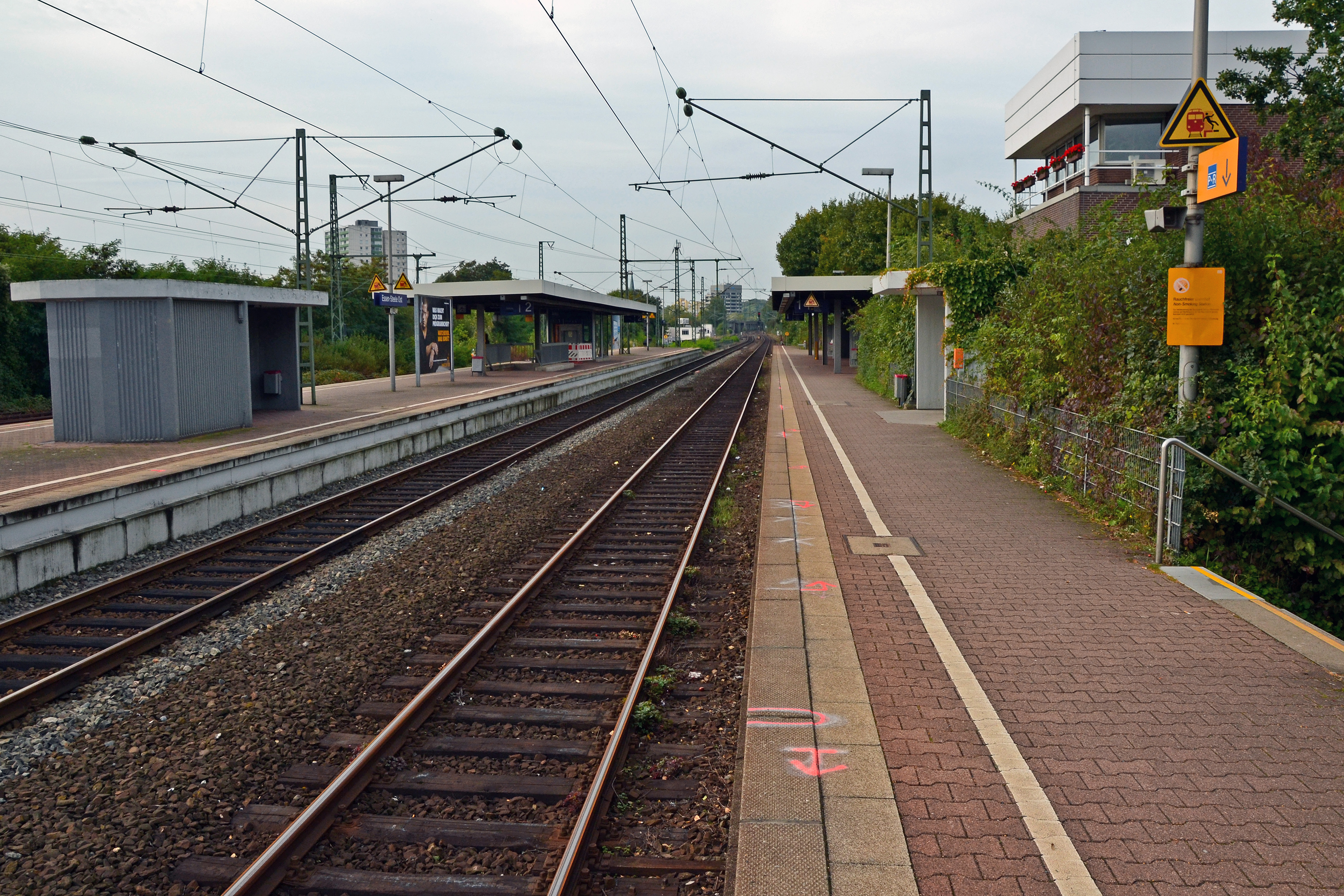
Tracks and platforms

== Services ==
It is served by Rhine-Ruhr S-Bahn lines S 1 (Dortmund–Solingen) on week days every 15 minutes during the day between Dortmund and Essen and line S 3 (Oberhausen–Hattingen) every 30 minutes.

It is also served by five bus routes: 164 (every 10 minutes), 170 (every 20 minutes) 174 (every 10–20 minutes) 184 (every 10 minutes) and 363 (every 30 minutes), operated by Ruhrbahn.
