= Essen-Steele station =

Railway station in Essen, Germany

Essen Steele
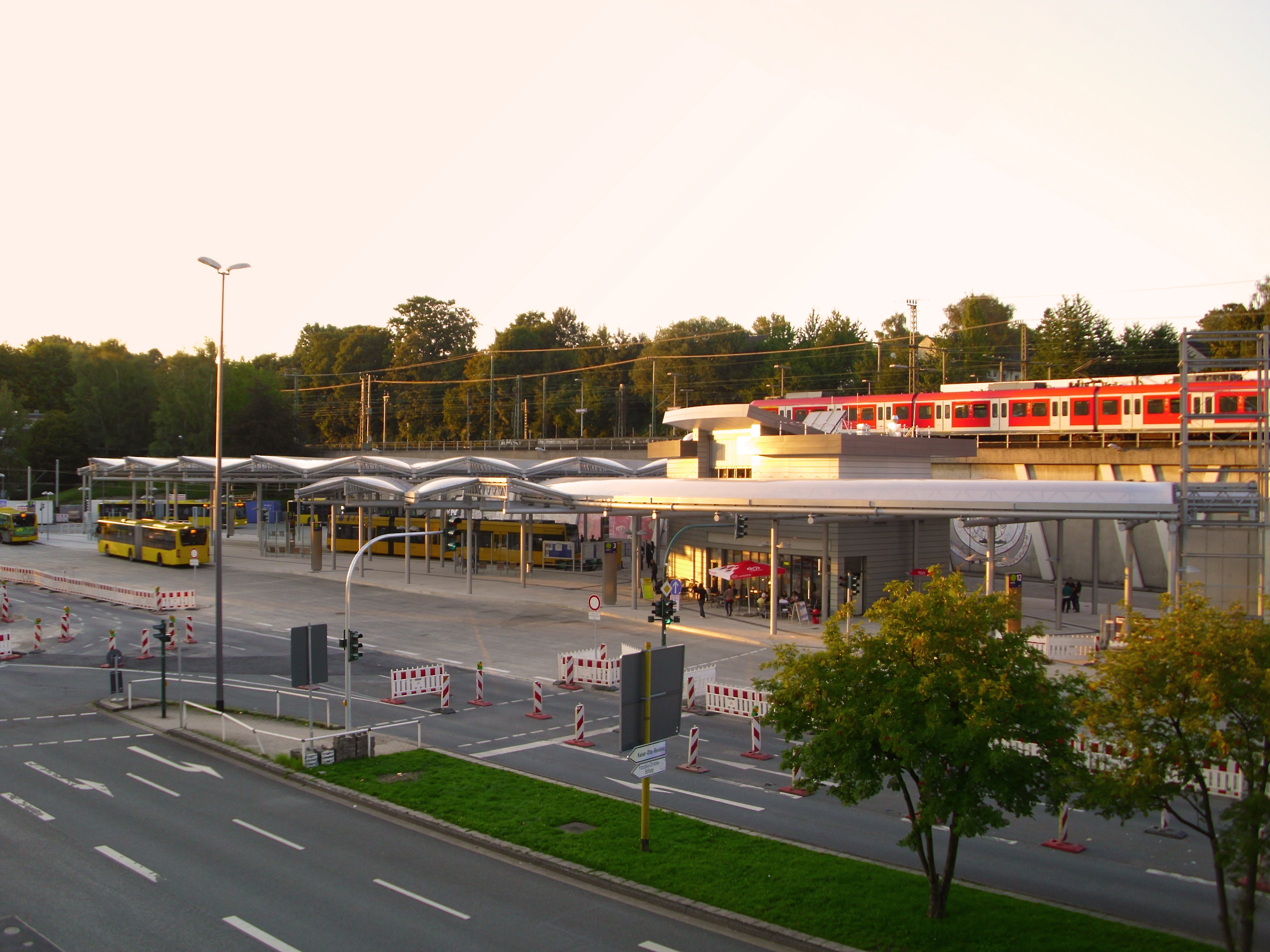
- Elevated railway tracks in the background

General information
- Location: Steeler Platz 1, Steele, Essen, NRW; Germany
- Coordinates: 51°27′1″N 7°4′33″E
- Owner: DB Netz
- Operator: DB Station&Service
- Lines: Dortmund–Duisburg (KBS 450.1); Wuppertal–Essen; Essen–Bochum
- Platforms: 2 island platform
- Tracks: 4
- Train operators: DB Regio - RheinRuhrBahn

Construction
- Accessible: Yes

Other information
- Station code: 1710
- DS100 code: EEST
- IBNR: 8000099
- Category: 4
- Fare zone: VRR: 356
- Website: www.bahnhof.de

History
- Opened: 1901

Services
Preceding station	DB Regio NRW	Following station
Essen Hbf towards Wesel	RE 49	Essen-Kupferdreh towards Wuppertal Hbf
Essen Hbf towards Aachen Hbf	RB 33	Terminus
Preceding station	Rhine-Ruhr S-Bahn	Following station
Essen Hbf towards Solingen Hbf	S1	Essen-Steele Ost towards Dortmund Hbf
Essen Hbf towards Oberhausen Hbf	S3	Essen-Steele Ost towards Hattingen (Ruhr) Mitte
Essen Hbf towards Haltern am See or Recklinghausen Hbf	S9	Essen-Überruhr towards Hagen Hbf
Location
- Location within North Rhine-Westphalia

Essen-Steele is located in the district of Essen-Steele in the German city of Essen in the German state of North Rhine-Westphalia. It is on the Witten/Dortmund–Oberhausen/Duisburg line and is classified by Deutsche Bahn as a category 4 station. It is served by the RB 33 (Rhein-Niers-Bahn) Aachen / Heinsberg, RE 49 (Wupper-Lippe-Express) and Rhine-Ruhr S-Bahn lines S1, S3 and S9.

== History ==
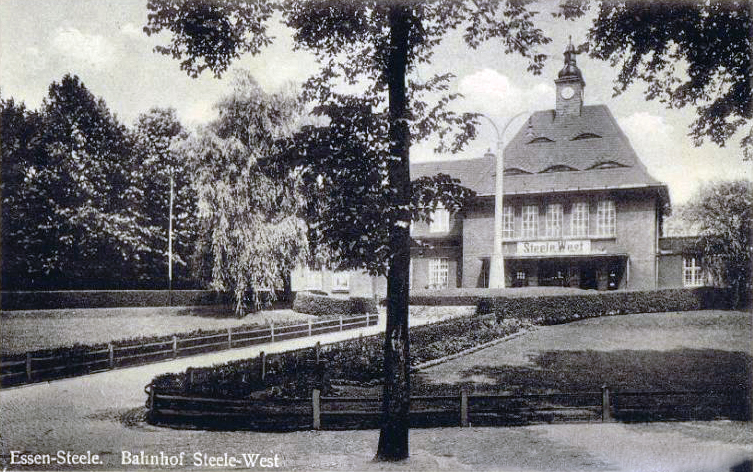
Steele West station about 1929, after the war it lacked a clock tower and the roof was much flatter

The section of the Witten/Dortmund–Oberhausen/Duisburg railway between Essen and Bochum via Wattenscheid was opened by the Bergisch-Märkische Railway Company on 1 March 1862. A station was built in the town of Steele, which is now called Essen-Steele Ost station.

The opening of the Ruhr bridge in Steele on 1 June 1863 connected the Wuppertal-Vohwinkel–Essen-Überruhr railway to Steele. This line had been operated by the Bergisch-Märkische Railway Company to the Ruhr opposite Steele since 1854, when it had taken over the Prince William Railway Company.

In 1901, Steele West station was opened, serving passengers only. The station building was completed in 1912. The station was renamed Essen-Steele West (then with the abbreviation of ESTW) on 14 May 1950 and it has been called Essen-Steele since 27 May 1979. The former Essen-Steele station was renamed Essen-Steele Ost.

The old station building was demolished in the early 1970s during the establishment of the plaza in front of the station and the rearrangement of transport arrangements.

The opening of the viaduct between Steele West and Überruhr on 1 February 1978 shortened the train running time between Wuppertal and Essen because previously all trains on this route had to reverse in Essen-Steele Ost station. Local transport service N9 was operated by push-pull trains because the line to Wuppertal was not electrified until 2003. It has been served by Rhine-Ruhr S-Bahn line S 9 since December 2003. It has been served by lines S 1 and S 3 since 1974.

== Current situation ==
The station is only served by the Rhine-Ruhr S-Bahn. It lies on the Witten/Dortmund–Oberhausen/Duisburg railway (timetable route 450.1) and connects to the Ruhr Valley Railway to Hattingen (Ruhr) Mitte (timetable route 450.3).

In Deutsche Bahn's directory of operating points, the station is given the abbreviation of EEST and it is classified by Deutsche Bahn as a category 4 station.

Since the opening of the transport plaza south of Steele station in 1978, it forms together with Essen-Steele Station one of the main transport hubs in Essen. It was designed to connect bus and tram passengers with Steele station so that they can quickly continue into the centre of Essen and to the neighbouring towns over the S-Bahn. From the beginning of 2009, the whole area was renovated, optimising pedestrian routes between modes and improving general accessibility, including to the S-Bahn platforms, so that the area, after being temporarily closed, was restored to operation on 28 August 2010. Two thirds of the reconstruction costs of approximately €9 million was met by the state of North Rhine-Westphalia and the remaining costs were divided between the city of Essen and the transport operators.

== Services ==
It is served by two Regional-Express services: the RB 33 (Rhein-Niers-Bahn) Aachen / Heinsberg (every 60 minutes) and the RE 49 (Wupper-Lippe-Express), Wuppertal Hbf – Wesel (every 60 minutes). It is also served by Rhine-Ruhr S-Bahn lines S1 (every 15 minutes), S3 (every 30 minutes), S9 (every 30 minutes).

It is served by Essen tram lines 103 (peak hours only to Hollestr, Borbeck and Dellwig) and 109 (to Porscheplatz, Altendorf and Frohnhausen), both at 10-minute intervals. It is also served by 10 bus routes.
