= Hattingen (Ruhr) station =

Railway station in Hattingen, Germany

Hattingen (Ruhr)
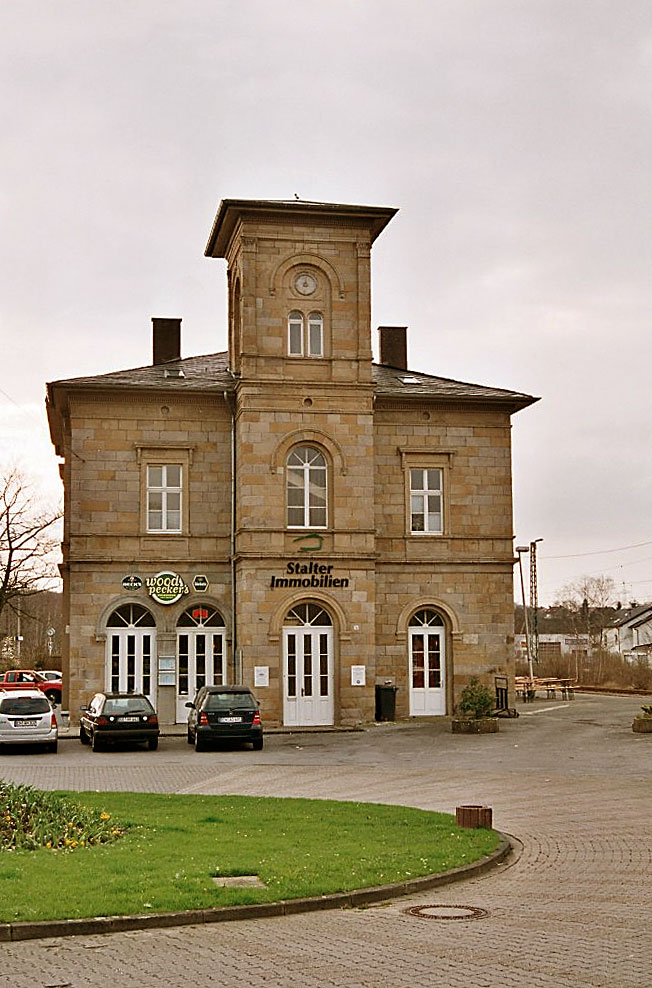

General information
- Location: Bahnhofstr. 79, Essen, NRW; Germany
- Coordinates: 51°24′02″N 7°10′10″E
- Owner: DB Netz
- Operator: DB Station&Service
- Lines: Ruhr Valley Railway (KBS 450.3)
- Platforms: 1
- Train operators: DB Regio NRW

Construction
- Accessible: Yes

Other information
- Station code: 2592
- DS100 code: EHAT
- IBNR: 8002639
- Category: 5
- Fare zone: VRR: 460
- Website: www.bahnhof.de

History
- Opened: 15 February 1870

Services
Preceding station	Rhine-Ruhr S-Bahn	Following station
B-Dahlhausen towards Oberhausen Hbf	S3	Hattingen (Ruhr) Mitte Terminus
Location
- Location within North Rhine-Westphalia

Hattingen station is located in the town of Hattingen on the Ruhr river in the German state of North Rhine-Westphalia and is classified by Deutsche Bahn as a category 5 station.

== History ==
Construction of the station building started on 15 August 1868 and it was officially opened on 15 February 1870. The building is constructed out of Ruhr sandstone with a three-storey tower on the entrance side. Like many monumental buildings of the Gründerzeit, it is based on the style of Karl Friedrich Schinkel. The station is located on a section of the Ruhr Valley Railway opened on the 28 December 1869 by the Bergisch-Märkische Railway Company.

Bahnhofsstraße connects the station, which is situated close to the Ruhr, with the town of Hattingen. At the end of the 19th century, this street was the axis of an extension of the town to the west. The former Henrichshütte steel works, founded in 1854, is a short distance up the river. Near the station is the former Birschel mill.

The end of mining in the region reduced the significance of the Ruhr Valley Railway. Regular passenger services in Hattingen ended on 30 November 1979. Even freight traffic no longer had much significance. On 20 May 1984, electrification of the line to Hattingen was completed and on 25 May 1985 the first electric train of the regional S-bahn network ran. The S-bahn uses only one platform, and it continues to a new underground terminus for the line in Hattingen-Mitte.

Hattingen station's main use now is as a stop on the heritage railway of the Bochum Dahlhausen Railway Museum. The station building has been renovated as an inn.

== Services ==
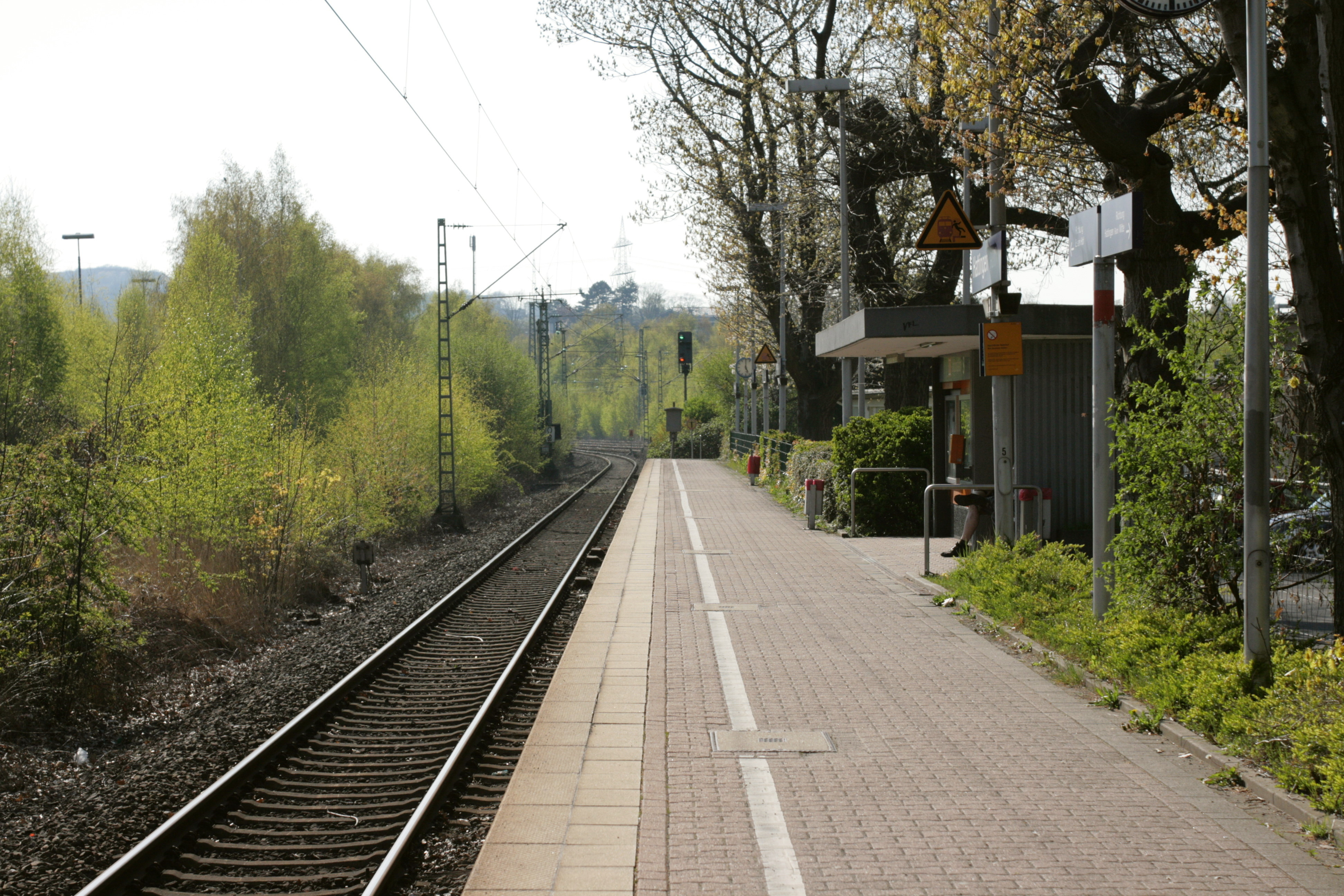
Platform

The station is served by Rhine-Ruhr S-Bahn line S3 every 30 minutes and two bus routes: 359 (operated every 30 minutes by BOGESTRA) and 558 (operated every 60 minutes by Verkehrsgesellschaft Ennepe-Ruhr).
