= Essen-Überruhr–Bochum-Langendreer railway =

Railway line in Germany

Coordinates: 51°26′16″N 7°10′33″E

Overview
- Line number: 2165
- Locale: North Rhine-Westphalia, Germany

Service
- Route number: 450.3 (Essen-Steele–Bochum-Dahlhausen)

Technical
- Line length: 21 km (13 mi)
- Track gauge: 1,435 mm (4 ft 8 1/2 in) standard gauge
- Operating speed: 80 km/h (50 mph)

The Essen-Ruhr-Bochum-Langendreer railway is a railway line in the Ruhr region of the German state of North Rhine-Westphalia. Part of it is now disused.

== Essen-Ruhr–Bochum-Dahlhausen ==
This section between Essen-Steele Ost and Bochum-Dahlhausen is used by S-Bahn line S 3 trains. The connecting curve from Essen-Überruhr to Essen-Steele Ost was used until 1978 by passenger trains, when a new bridge was built in Steele to allow a direct connection between the Wuppertal-Vohwinkel–Essen-Überruhr railway and Essen-Steele station. Since then the curve to Essen-Steele Ost is used only as required by freight trains.

== Bochum-Dahlhausen–Bochum Langendreer (Hasenwinkel coal line) ==
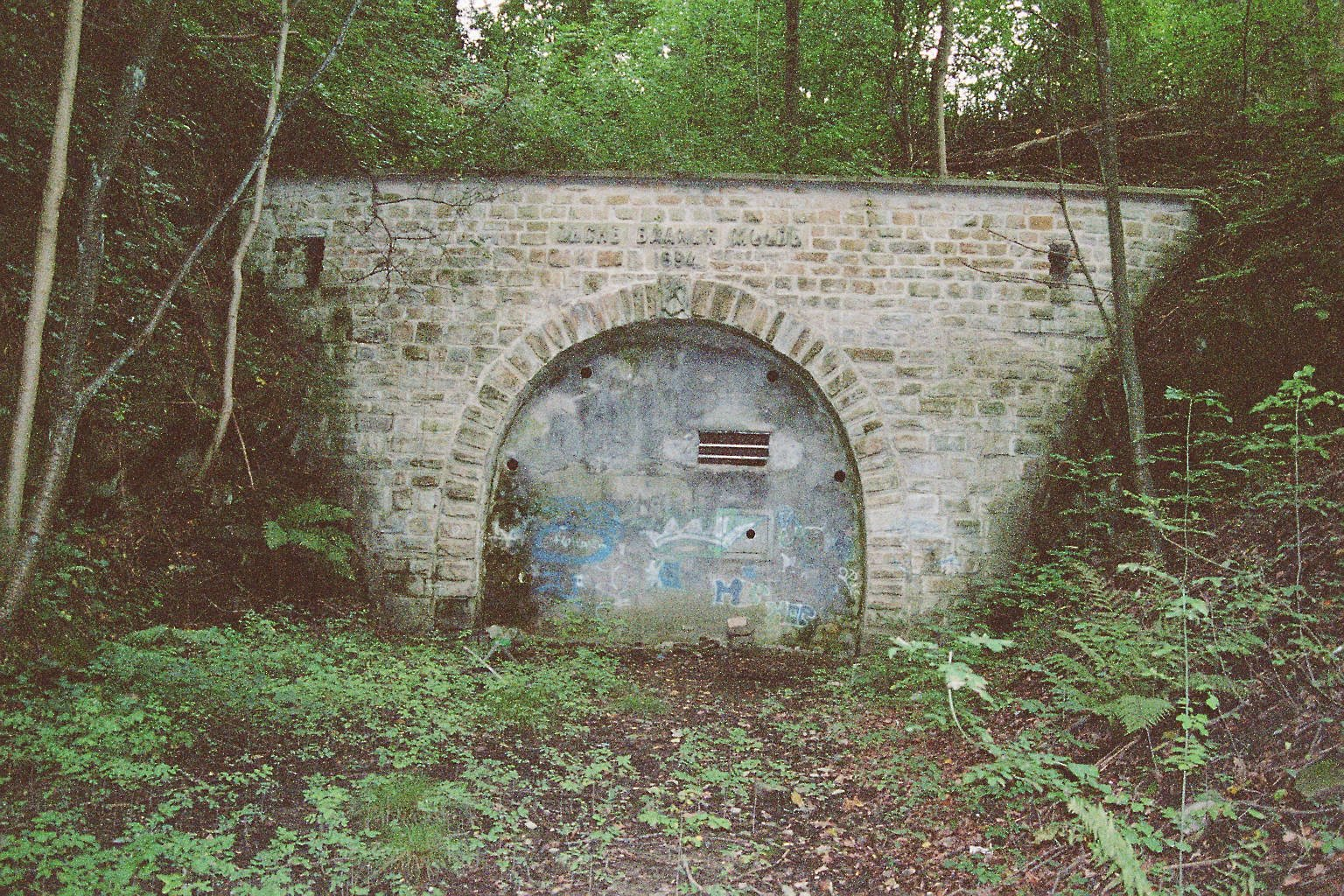
Portal of the only tunnel on the Hasenwinkel coal line.

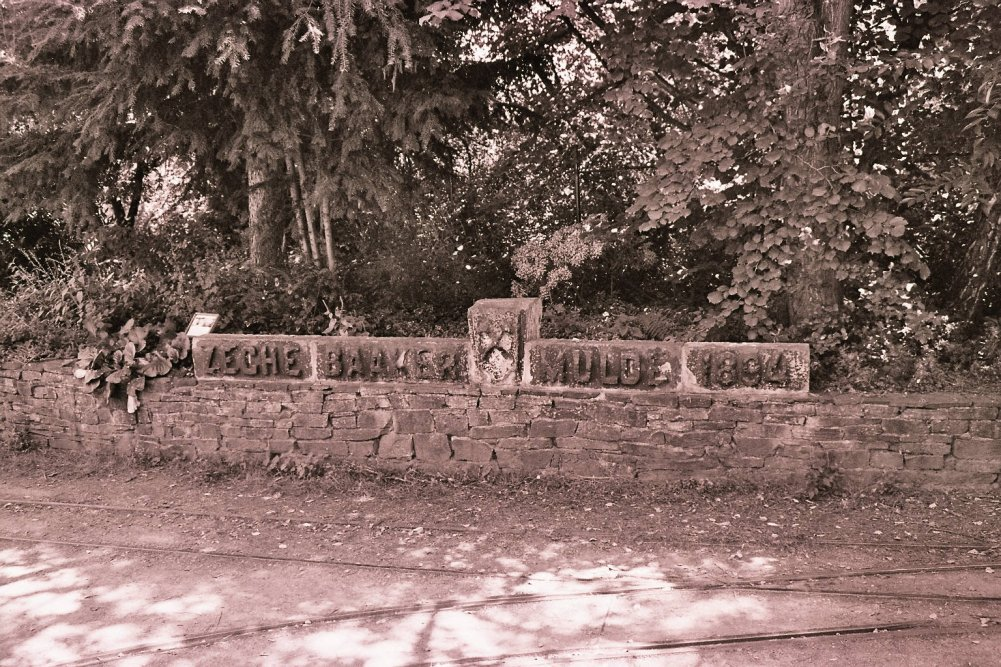
Tunnel keystone.

The Hasenwinkel coal line (German: Hasenwinkeler Kohlenweg) was a network of coal lines that was used for freight transport in Bochum. It ran from Bochum-Laer to the Dannenbaum colliery (later the site of the Bochum I plant of Opel), the Prinz Regent colliery and Haus Weitmar (a stately house) on the way to Bochum-Dahlhausen station in Dahlhausen on the Ruhr Valley Railway, which runs next to the Ruhr river.

The line started as a horse-hauled line from the Sonnenschein and Hasenwinkel mines. In 1811, the Gute Hoffnung iron works provided the cast-iron rails and wagons for the line, which was referred to as the englische Kohlenbahn ("English Coal Railway").

As part of the construction of the Ruhr Valley Railway from 1863, a section of the line was converted to standard gauge in 1865 and in 1868 conversion started on a further 10.2 kilometres to Laer (opened on 10 October 1870) and Bochum-Weitmar station was built. It was incorporated in 1870 into the Bergisch-Märkische Railway Company.

A siding to the Friedlicher Nachbar colliery, opened in 1894, included the only railway tunnel on the network; it was 350 metres long. The tunnel was filled in, a few years ago, because it was in acute danger of collapse. The keystone of one of the two tunnel portals is now in the Bochum Dahlhausen Railway Museum.

The end of the Ruhr mining industry led to the closure of the section from Bochum-Dahlhausen in 1969, but until 1979 the line was used as a siding to an industrial company. The power plant in Weitmar was still supplied in 1984 from Langendreer. Parts of the route are now used as a cycling and hiking trail. The further conversion of a disused branch on the edge of central Bochum is approved and construction will begin in the coming months. It will then be possible to cross the entire city, except the central city, from north to south along former railway lines, using the Bochum Erzbahn (iron ore railway) and the Hasenwinkel coal line.
