= Steele, Essen =

Suburb of Essen

Coordinates: 51°26′58″N 7°4′35″E

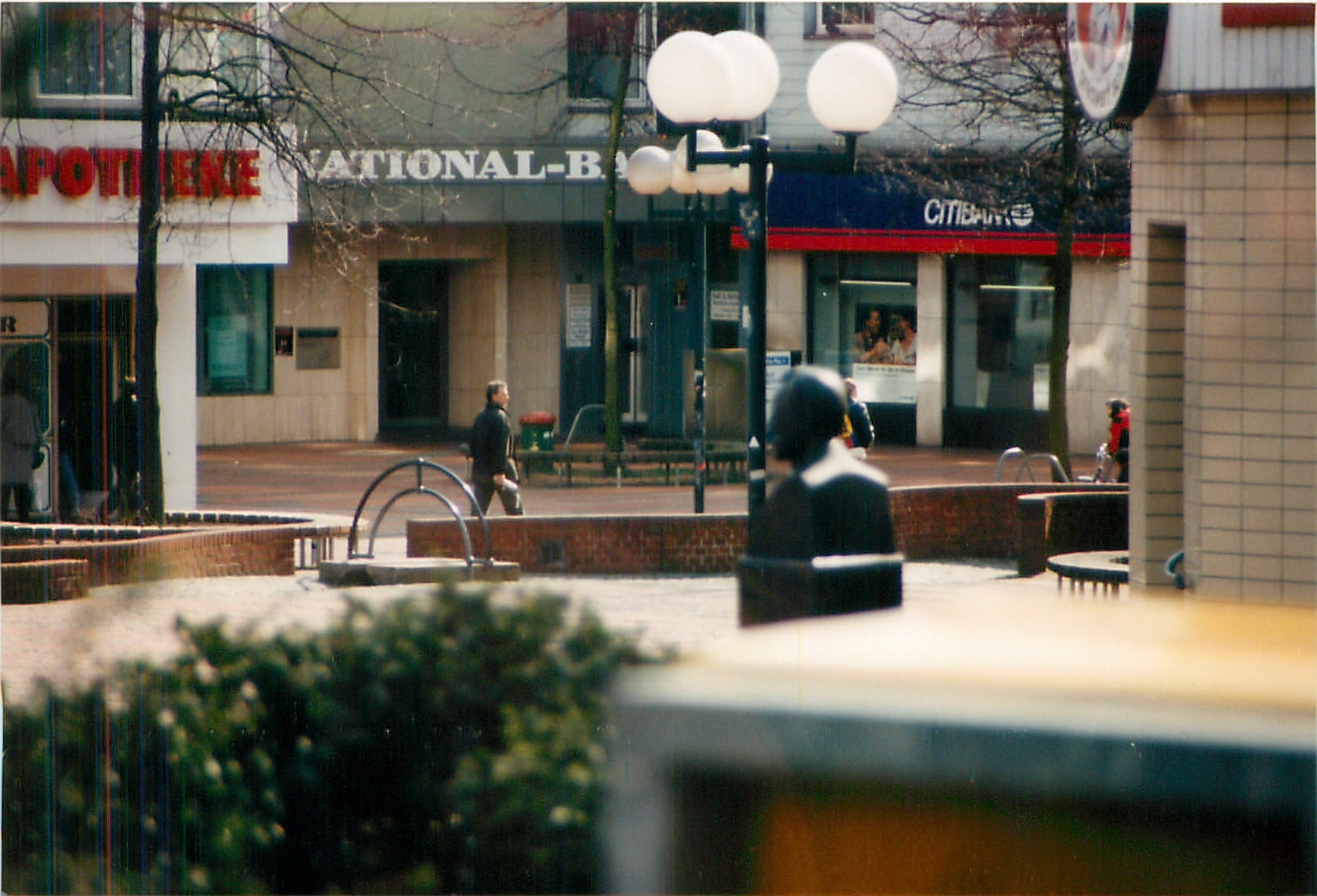
Street in modern Steele

Steele (German pronunciation: [ˈʃteːlə]) is a suburb of Essen, Germany. It is bordered on the south by the Ruhr river, and by the suburbs of Kray in the north, Leithe in the northeast, Freisenbruch in the east, Horst in the southeast, Überruhr in the south, Bergerhausen in the southwest, and Huttrop in the west. It has two railway stations, Essen-Steele station and Essen-Steele Ost station.

Steele became a city in the Ruhrgebiet (Ruhr area) in 1578, and in 1905 its population was 12,988. In 1929 it became a suburb of Essen.

A Diet of the Holy Roman Empire was held here in the year 938 by the emperor Otto I.
