= Bergerhausen =

Central borough of Essen, Germany

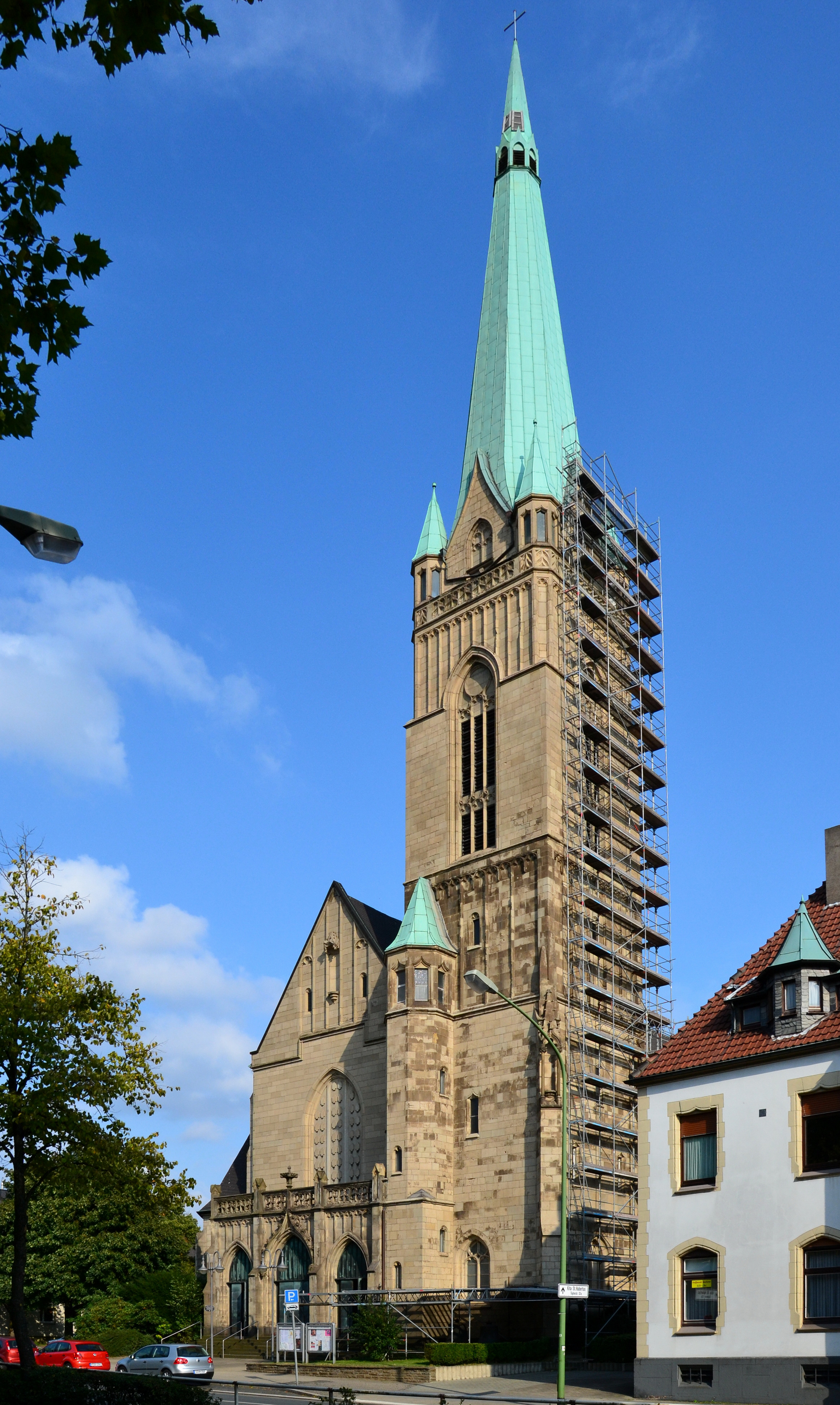
Church of St. Hubertus in 2012

Bergerhausen (German pronunciation: [bɛʁɡɐˈhaʊzn̩]) is a central borough of the city of Essen, Germany, located south of the city centre (Stadtkern). It was incorporated into the city in 1910. Before it had been part of the Bürgermeisterei Rellinghausen (Rellinghausen district). Around 11.700 people live here.

Bergerhausen was first mentioned in 943 as Bergarahuson.

== Geography ==
Bergerhausen borders the boroughs of Steele and Überruhr-Hinsel to the east, Rellinghausen and Stadtwald to the south, Rüttenscheid in the west, and Huttrop in the north.
