= Wattenscheid-Höntrop station =

Railway station in Bochum, Germany

Wattenscheid Höntrop
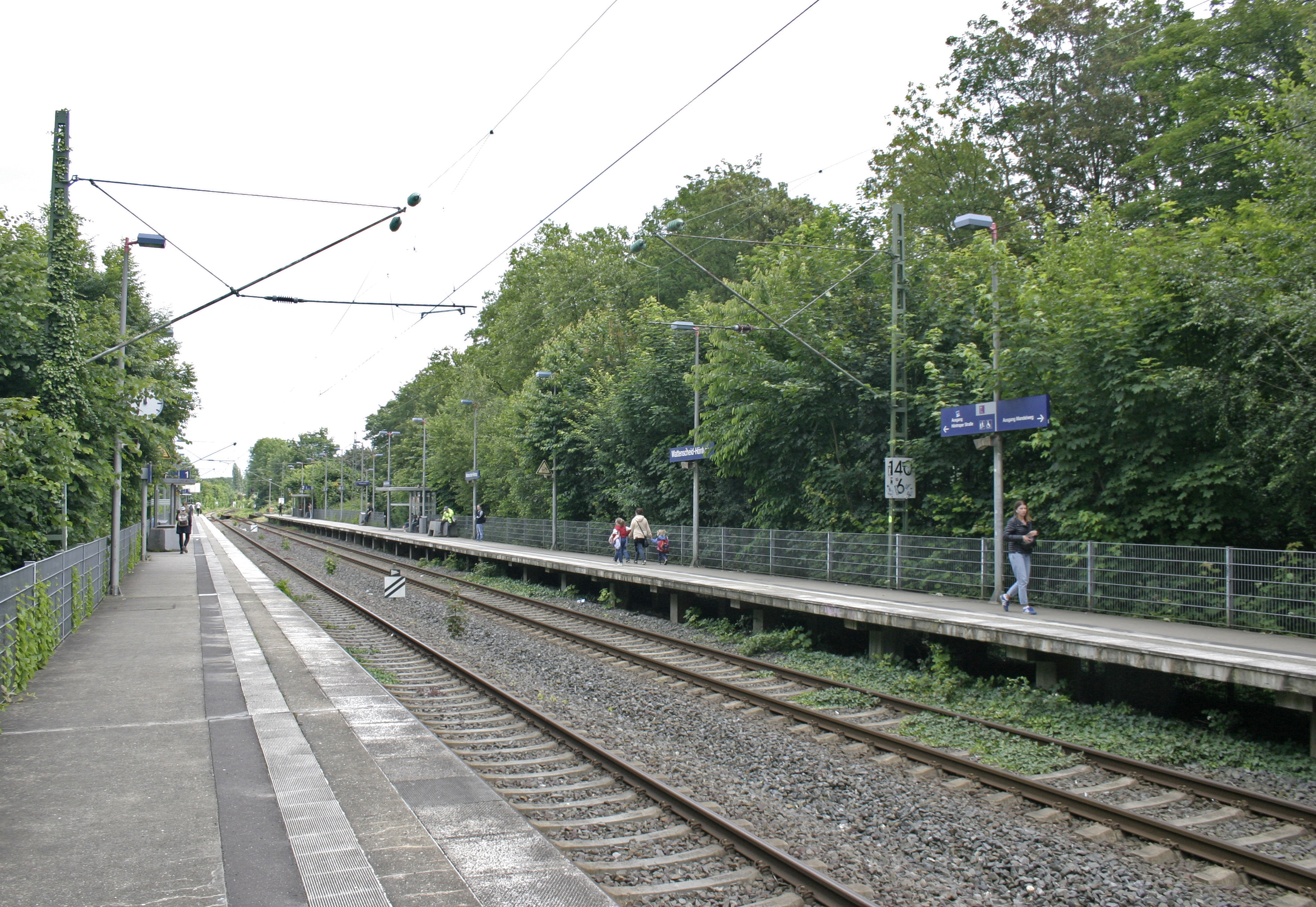

General information
- Location: Höntroperstr. 48, Langendreer, NRW; Germany
- Coordinates: 51°27′37″N 7°09′16″E
- Lines: Dortmund–Duisburg (KBS 450.1)
- Platforms: 2
- Tracks: 2

Construction
- Accessible: Yes

Other information
- Station code: 6569
- DS100 code: EWHP
- IBNR: 8006227
- Category: 5
- Fare zone: VRR: 368
- Website: www.bahnhof.de

History
- Opened: 1 March 1862

Services
Preceding station	Rhine-Ruhr S-Bahn	Following station
Essen-Eiberg towards Solingen Hbf	S1	B-Ehrenfeld towards Dortmund Hbf
Location

Wattenscheid-Höntrop station is a railway station in the district of Wattenscheid of the city of Bochum in the German state of North Rhine-Westphalia. It is on the 97 km-long (60 mi) route of Rhine-Ruhr S-Bahn line S1 from Dortmund to Solingen. Wattenscheid station, which is more than a kilometre to the northwest is only served by regional trains.

== History ==
The Witten/Dortmund–Oberhausen/Duisburg line of the Bergisch-Märkische Railway Company (German: Bergisch-Märkischen Eisenbahn-Gesellschaft) was put into operation from the former Bochum Süd station to Mülheim on 1 March 1862. A waiting room with a ticket office was opened in Höntrop on 1 June 1886. On 1 October 1910, an entrance building was opened.

S-Bahn line S 1 has served the station since 26 May 1974. The entrance building has since been used as a shop or as a restaurant. Most recently it has housed a health food store.

== Services ==
Wattenscheid-Höntrop S-Bahn station is on the Witten/Dortmund–Oberhausen/Duisburg line and is classified by Deutsche Bahn as a category 5 station. It is served by Rhine-Ruhr S-Bahn line S1 (Dortmund–Solingen) every 15 minutes during the day on week days between Dortmund and Essen.

The Wattenscheid-Höntrop S bus stop is located in close proximity to the station on Höntroper Straße. It is served by bus lines 365 (every 30 minutes), 389 (every 20 minutes) and 390 (every 20 minutes), operated by BOGESTRA. In walking distance you can reach the stop Höntrop Kirche. There are connections to other bus lines as well as to tram line 310 via the city centres of Bochum and Witten to Witten-Heven.

Unlike Wattenscheid station, this station has been completely renovated, making it accessible for the disabled. A wheelchair-accessible entrance is available for all trains. Wattenscheid Höntrop has park-and-ride facilities and parking space for bicycles.
