= Rellinghausen =

Borough of Essen, Germany

Coordinates: 51°25′31″N 7°03′06″E

Rellinghausen (German pronunciation: [ʁɛlɪŋˈhaʊzn̩]) is a borough located in the central-southern part of Essen, Germany. It was incorporated into Essen in 1910. As of 31 March 2025, it has a population of 3,545 residents.

Rellinghausen borders the Essen boroughs of Bergerhausen to the north, Überruhr-Hinsel to the east, Heisingen to the south, and Stadtwald to the west.

== History ==
Rellinghausen was first mentioned in 860 and originally consisted of an Oberhof (a central farmstead), a church, and presumably several additional farmhouses. The inhabitants of that time are believed to have been of Frankish or Saxon origin. However, as the border of the Frankish Kingdom ran through the area, a clear cultural distinction cannot be definitively established.

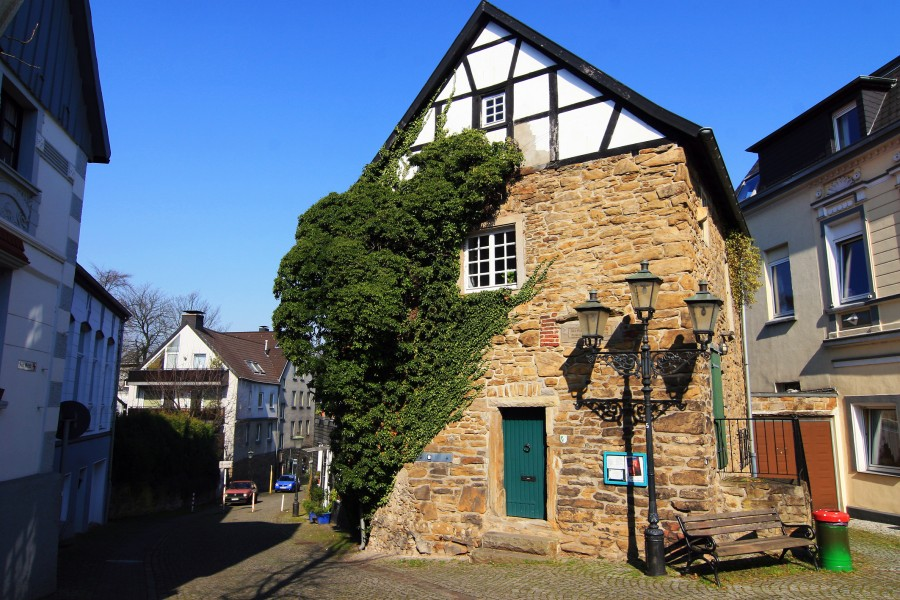
Blücherturm in the historic center, formerly used as a court tower

In 996 or 998, Abbess Mathilde of Essen established an abbey for noblewomen in Rellinghausen.

Throughout the Middle Ages, the village remained a relatively quiet place with little through traffic. Most trade and activity occurred in the larger city of Essen to the north, which was situated directly on the renowned Hellweg trade route.

In 1240, Dietrich von Altena-Isenberg built a castle in the Rellinghausen area, now known as Isenburg. However, he lost it to the Archbishop of Cologne in 1244. Heinrich von Vittinghof continued to claim Isenburg, but since it was already occupied, the Archbishop of Cologne permitted him in 1273 to expand a nearby farm into a castle. In 1452, the Vittinghof (Schell) family relocated to the nearby Castle Schellenberg.

The Vittinghofs were a noble family who held rights over the land. In 1909, they left the region due to a dispute over the newly constructed Zeche Gottfried-Wilhelm site. During their time in Rellinghausen, the family maintained close ties with the local population and established schools and social institutions, including a poorhouse where the needy could live rent-free and receive meals.

Today, Rellinghausen consists predominantly of residential areas.
