= Dahlhausen =

Coordinates: 51°25′35″N 7°08′38″E

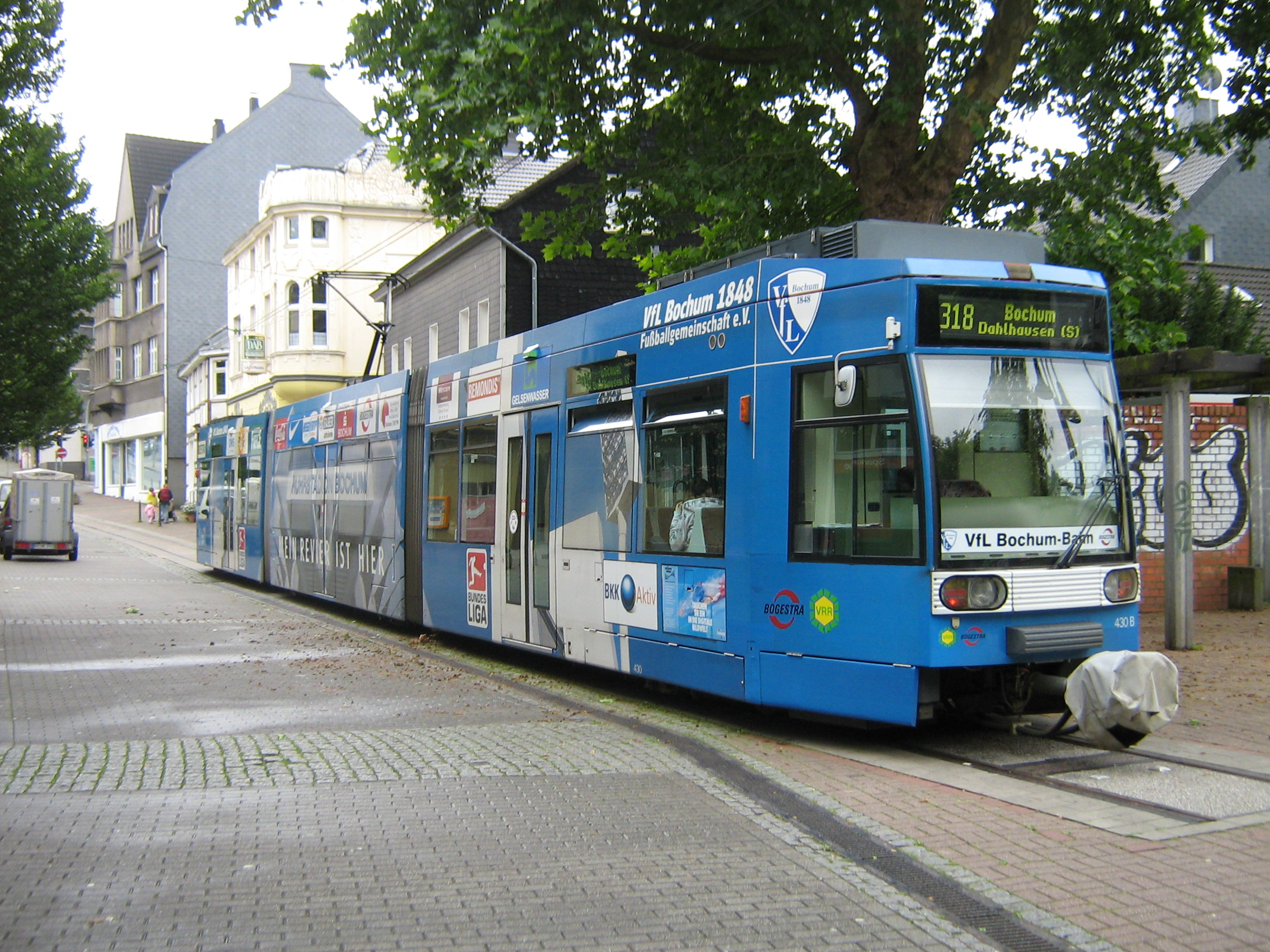
Tram in Dahlhausen

Dahlhausen is a South-Western district of the city of Bochum in North Rhine-Westphalia in Germany. It borders Essen and Hattingen. A large part of the border of Dahlhausen is formed by the river Ruhr. South of the Ruhr is the district of Burgaltendorf of the city of Essen. Dahlhausen houses the well known railway museum of Dahlhausen. The Dr. C. Otto & Comp. is an old company of international importance.

Bochum-Dahlhausen station is served by Line S 3 of the Rhine-Ruhr S-Bahn. Tram line 318 of the Bochum Stadtbahn connects Dahlhausen to the historical centre of Bochum, which is similar in extent to the district of Gleisdreieck. Dahlhausen is in a way separate from the rest from the city, keeping a greater continuity than other parts of the city
