= Bochum-Ehrenfeld station =

Railway station in Germany

Bochum Ehrenfeld
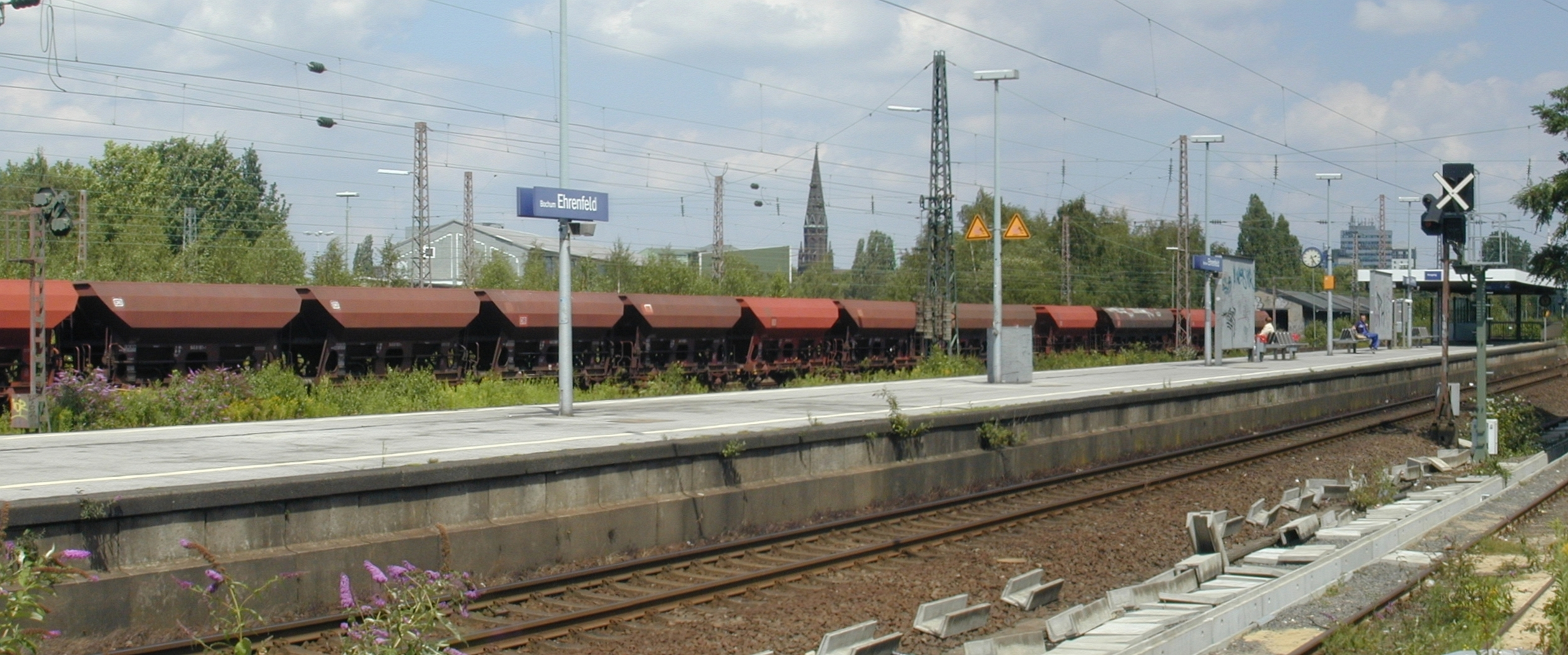

General information
- Location: Bessemerstr. 100, Bochum, NRW; Germany
- Coordinates: 51°28′21″N 7°12′35″E
- Lines: Dortmund–Duisburg (KBS 450.1)
- Platforms: 2

Construction
- Accessible: No

Other information
- Station code: 0728
- DS100 code: EBOE
- IBNR: 8001039
- Category: 5
- Fare zone: VRR: 360
- Website: www.bahnhof.de

History
- Opened: 25 September 1977

Services
Preceding station	Rhine-Ruhr S-Bahn	Following station
Wattenscheid-Höntrop towards Solingen Hbf	S1	Bochum Hbf towards Dortmund Hbf
Location

Bochum-Ehrenfeld station is a station in the district of Ehrenfeld of the city of Bochum in the German state of North Rhine-Westphalia. It is on the Witten/Dortmund–Oberhausen/Duisburg railway and it is classified by Deutsche Bahn as a category 5 station. The station was opened on 25 September 1977.

The station is served by line S 1 of the Rhine-Ruhr S-Bahn (Dortmund–Solingen), running between Dortmund and Essen, every 15 minutes during the day on weekdays.
