= Bochum-Linden =

Coordinates: 51°25′32″N 7°09′38″E

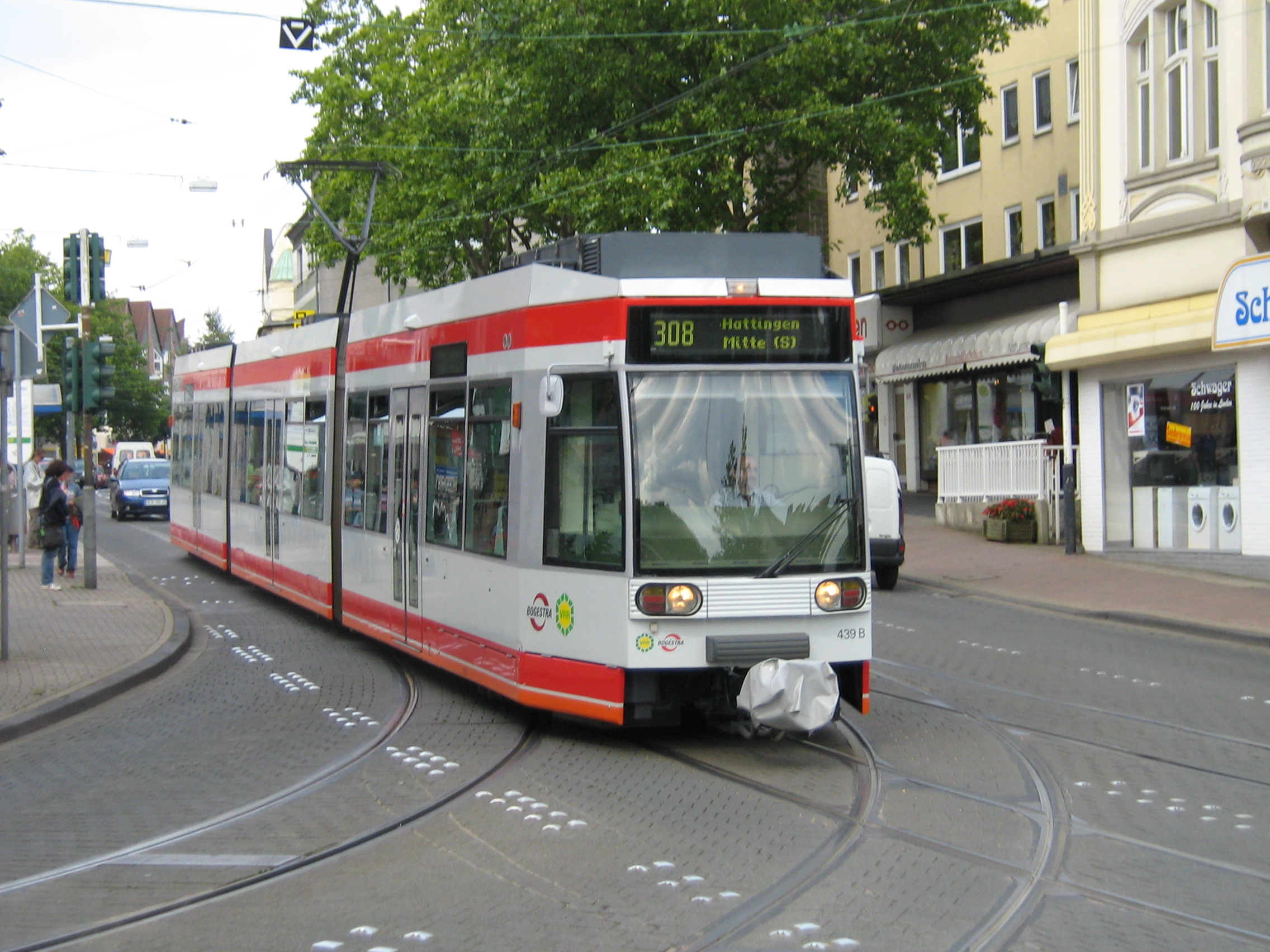
Tram in Bochum-Linden

Bochum-Linden is a district of the City of Bochum in the Ruhr area in North Rhine-Westphalia in Germany. The population's main language was once Westphalian, but it has since been replaced by High German. Bochum-Linden is located in the south west of Bochum, between Dahlhausen and Stiepel. It shares a border with Hattingen, a city of Ennepe-Ruhr-Kreis.
