= Essen-Eiberg station =

Railway station in Essen, Germany

Essen Eiberg
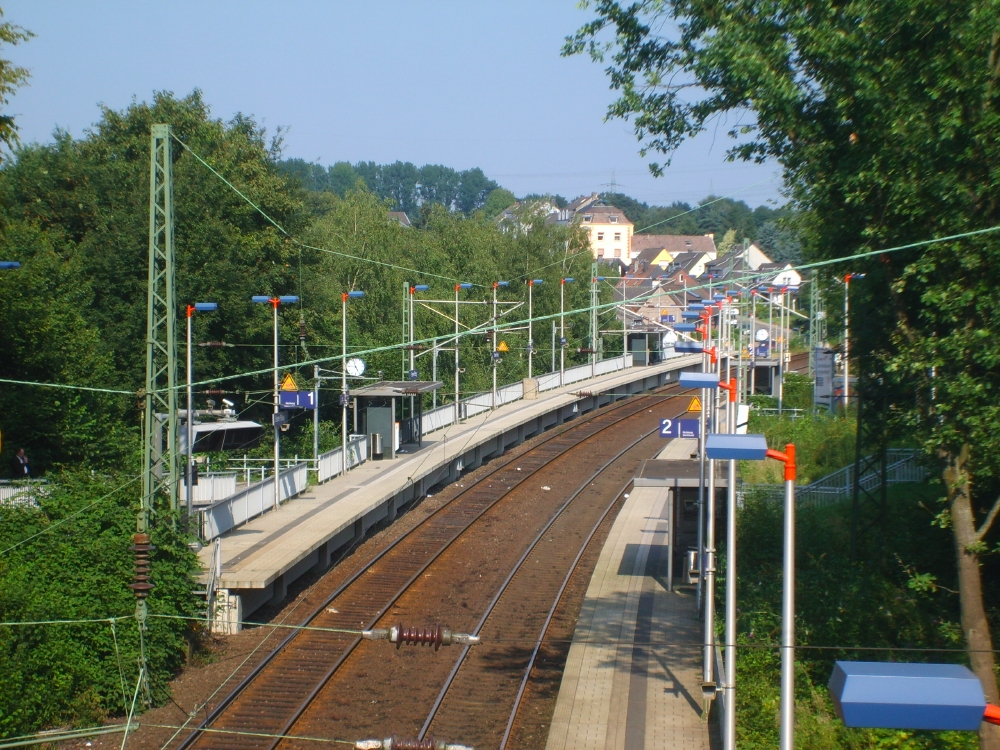

General information
- Location: Sachsenring 1, Essen, NRW; Germany
- Coordinates: 51°26′30″N 7°06′35″E
- Lines: Dortmund–Duisburg (KBS 450.1)
- Platforms: 2

Construction
- Accessible: Yes

Other information
- Station code: 1700
- DS100 code: EEIB
- IBNR: 8001905
- Category: 5
- Fare zone: VRR: 356
- Website: www.bahnhof.de

History
- Opened: 1968/69

Services
Preceding station	Rhine-Ruhr S-Bahn	Following station
Essen-Steele Ost towards Solingen Hbf	S1	Wattenscheid-Höntrop towards Dortmund Hbf
Location

Essen-Eiberg station is a station in the district of Eiberg of the city of Essen in the German state of North Rhine-Westphalia. It is on the Witten/Dortmund–Oberhausen/Duisburg railway.

== History ==
The name of the station refers to the former municipality of Eiberg, which extended over the western parts of modern Bochum and the eastern parts of the Essen suburbs of Freisenbruch and Horst. At the end of the 1960s the station was established lies in the southeastern part of Freisenbruch on the Witten/Dortmund–Oberhausen/Duisburg railway, which is part of the main east–west trunk line of the Ruhr, opened in this area in 1874.

== Current situation ==
The station is only served by line S1 of the Rhine-Ruhr S-Bahn and lies on the Witten/Dortmund–Oberhausen/Duisburg railway (timetable route 450.1). In Deutsche Bahn's directory of operating points, the station is given the abbreviation of EEIB and it is classified by Deutsche Bahn as a category 5 station.

== Rail services ==
The station is served by S1 of the Rhine-Ruhr S-Bahn (Dortmund–Solingen) on week days every 15 minutes during the day between Dortmund and Essen.

It is also served by three bus routes, operated by Ruhrbahn at 10 or 20 minute intervals: 164, 174 and 184.
