= S3 (Rhine-Ruhr S-Bahn) =

Railway service of the Rhine Ruhr S-Bahn network

Line S3 is a S-Bahn in the Rhein-Ruhr network. It runs from Oberhausen over Essen to Hattingen Mitte. It is operated at 30-minute intervals, using Stadler FLIRT 3XL units.

Line S 3 mainly runs over three lines built or acquired by the Bergisch-Märkische Railway Company:

- from Oberhausen Hauptbahnhof to Essen-Steele Ost over the Witten/Dortmund–Oberhausen/Duisburg railway, opened in 1862,
- from Essen-Steele Ost to Bochum-Dahlhausen over the Essen-Überruhr–Bochum-Langendreer railway, which was a former coal railway that was converted to standard gauge in 1865 and taken over by the Bergisch-Märkische Railway in 1870,
- from Bochum-Dahlhausen to Hattingen over the Ruhr Valley Railway, opened in 1869.

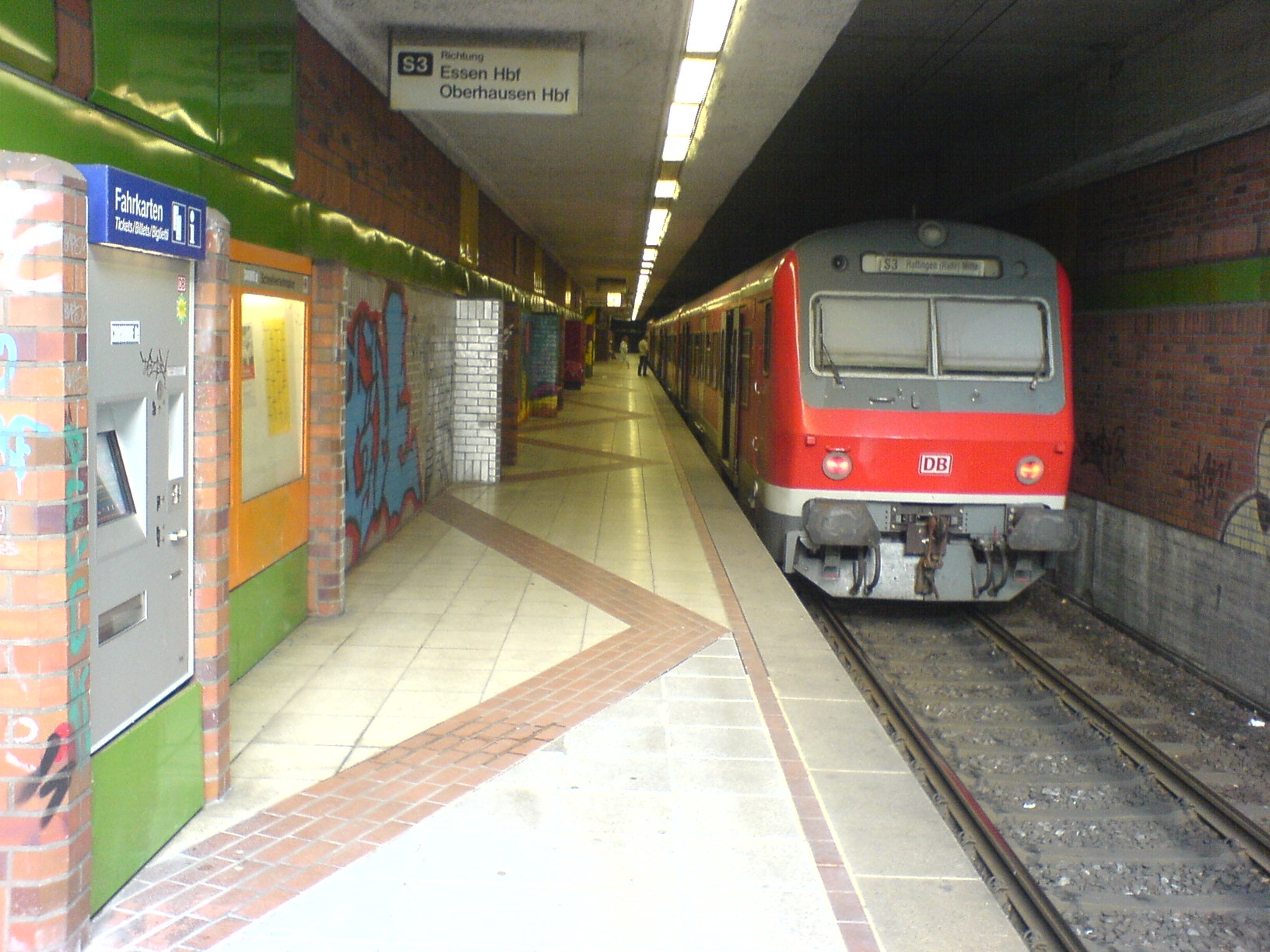
Hattingen (Ruhr) Mitte station

Its last 1.2 km to Hattingen Mitte runs over the Wuppertal-Wichlinghausen–Hattingen railway opened by the Prussian state railways in 1884 and a short section of line opened by Deutsche Bundesbahn in 1987, including a 100 metre long tunnel.

S-Bahn services commenced between Oberhausen and Hattingen on 26 May 1974. Services were extended from Hattingen to Hattingen Mitte on 3 July 1987.
