= Hattingen (Ruhr) Mitte station =

Railway station in Hattingen, Germany

Hattingen (Ruhr) Mitte
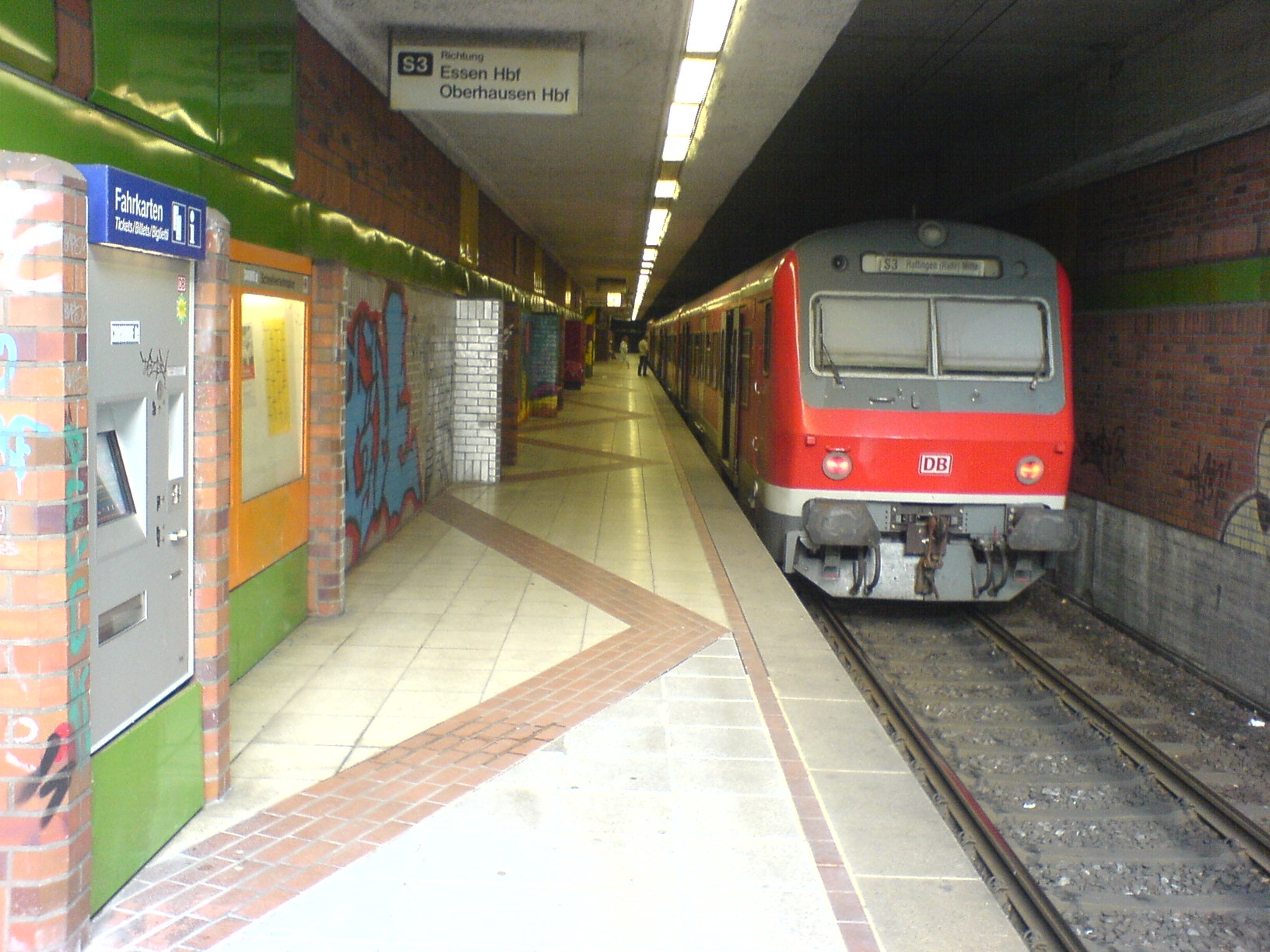
- Underground S-Bahn platform in 2007

General information
- Location: Martin-Luther-Str. 18, Hattingen, Essen, NRW; Germany
- Coordinates: 51°23′50″N 7°10′48″E
- Owner: Deutsche Bahn
- Operator: DB Netz; DB Station&Service
- Lines: Ruhr Valley Railway (KBS 450.3)
- Platforms: 1
- Train operators: DB Regio NRW

Construction
- Accessible: Yes

Other information
- Station code: 2593
- DS100 code: EHTM
- IBNR: 8002640
- Category: 6
- Fare zone: VRR: 460
- Website: www.bahnhof.de

History
- Opened: 3 July 1987

Services
Preceding station	Rhine-Ruhr S-Bahn	Following station
Hattingen (Ruhr) towards Oberhausen Hbf	S3	Terminus
Location

Hattingen (Ruhr) Mitte is a railway station situated in Hattingen in western Germany. It is a terminus station for line S3 of the Rhine-Ruhr S-Bahn and is classified by Deutsche Bahn as a category 6 station.

The station was opened by Deutsche Bundesbahn on 3 July 1987.

It is served by Rhine-Ruhr S-Bahn line S3 every 30 minutes, tram route 308 (every 10 minutes) and 12 daytime bus routes: SB37 (every 30/60 minutes), SB38 (every 60 minutes), 141 (every 30 minutes), 330 (every 120 minutes), 331 (every 60–120 minutes), 332 (every 60 minutes), 350 (every 15 minutes), 359 (every 30 minutes), 554 (every 60 minutes), 558 (every 60 minutes), 559 (every 60 minutes) and 647 (every 20/40 minutes), in addition to one night bus route on weekends: NE4 (every 60 minutes), operated by BOGESTRA, Verkehrsgesellschaft Ennepe-Ruhr and WSW mobil.
