= Bochum Dahlhausen Railway Museum =

Railway museum in Bochum Dahlhausen

Coordinates: 51°25′55″N 7°07′28″E

Ruhr Industrial Heritage Trail

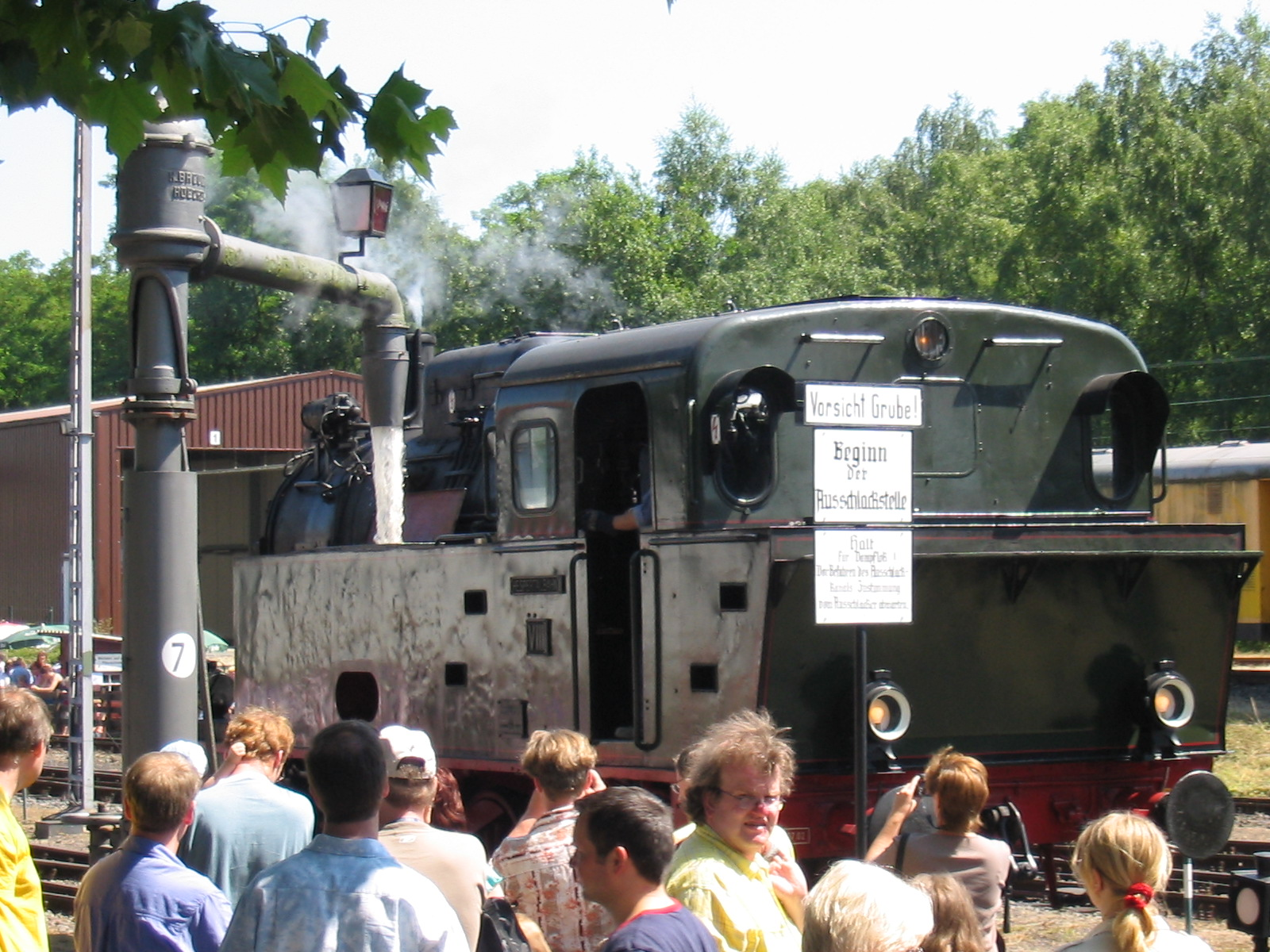
Family Day in the museum

Bochum Dahlhausen Railway Museum, North Rhine-Westphalia

The Eisenbahnmuseum Bochum-Dahlhausen is a railway museum situated south of the city of Bochum in the state of North Rhine-Westphalia, Germany. It was founded by DGEG, the German Railway History Company in 1977 and is based in a locomotive depot that was built between 1916 and 1918 and ceased operation in 1969. Then DGEG took over the whole area of 46,000 square metres and built up the biggest railway museum in Germany. In the middle of the museum, there is an engine shed with fourteen tracks. A preserved turntable, coaling, watering, and sanding facilities are still in operation. This museum is integrated into The Industrial Heritage Trail (Route der Industriekultur) a route of monuments from the history of the industry.

== Exhibits ==
The origins of the vehicle collection go back to 1967. A variety of steam locomotives and other technically interesting railway vehicles from different epochs are displayed. There are over 200 exhibits in total. The stars of the exhibition are the heavy locomotives.

Examples include:

- DRG Class 01
- DRG Class 44
- DRG Class 50
- DRG Class 80 (in grey photo livery)
- Bavarian S 3/6 (cut-away model; currently exhibit at Deutsches Museum, Munich)
- Prussian P 8
- Prussian T 9.1 (currently exhibit at Starlight Express musical hall, Bochum)
- Prussian T 20
- Württemberg Hz
- DB Class 66
- DRG Class E 32
- DRB Class E 94
- Wehrmacht locomotive WR 360 C 14
- DB Class 212
- DB Class V 65
- Wismar Railbus
- DB Class ETA 150

Amongst the exhibits there is even a collection of signals with a functioning Prussian signal box, that stood in Cologne-Mülheim until 1982. The exhibits are looked after by 130 mainly voluntary employees, who are also involved in the museum railway services where they wear historical uniforms.

At present the museum is busy refurbishing locomotive number 66 002 with the help of donations.

Museum vehicles and installations are often used for film and television productions. For example, a large part of the railway scenes in the film "Das Wunder von Bern" took place in Dahlhausen.

A highlight in the history of the railway museum was the large vehicle show put on in 1985 as part of the 150th anniversary of the German railways.

== Museum railway ==
In summer, regular museum train services are operated by the Ruhr Valley Railway (Ruhrtalbahn) along the banks of the river Ruhr to Hagen using usually a Uerdingen railbus, but sometimes a variety of locomotives, including a steam engine. A Prussian P 8 (38 2267) owned by the museum is usually used for the steam services. When there is steam service on the Ruhrtalbahn (usually every first Sunday of a month), the Uerdingen railbus operate another abandoned railway, the Teckel from Hagen to Ennepetal Klutert cave. In addition, from 2009 there were regular trips to the Zollverein coal mine (Zeche Zollverein) via Mülheim and Essen.

Part of the museum train to Hagen includes a restored passenger coach by MAN from 1921 belonging to the Essen Model Railway Club (Modell-Eisenbahn-Club Essen & Umgebung e.V.) founded in 1949.

== Gallery ==
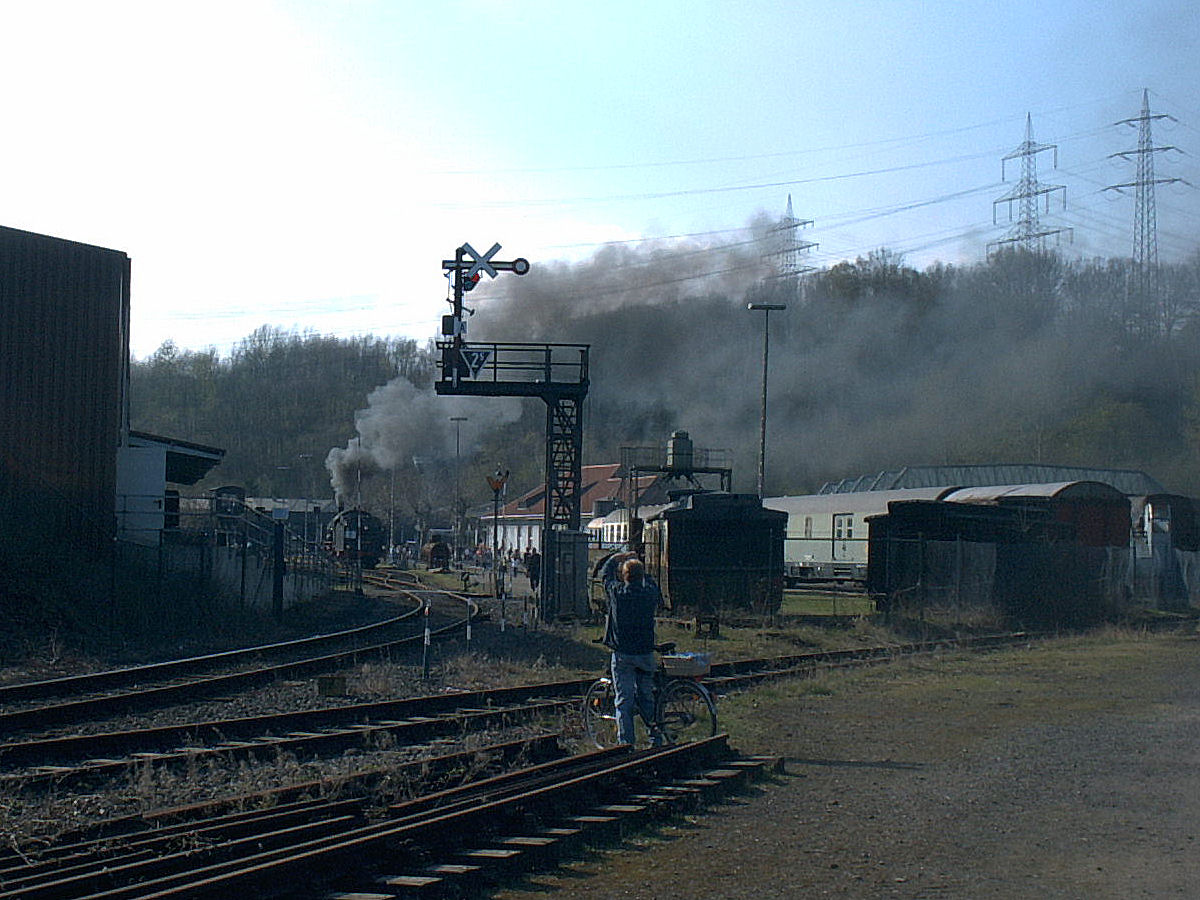
Steam loco in operation

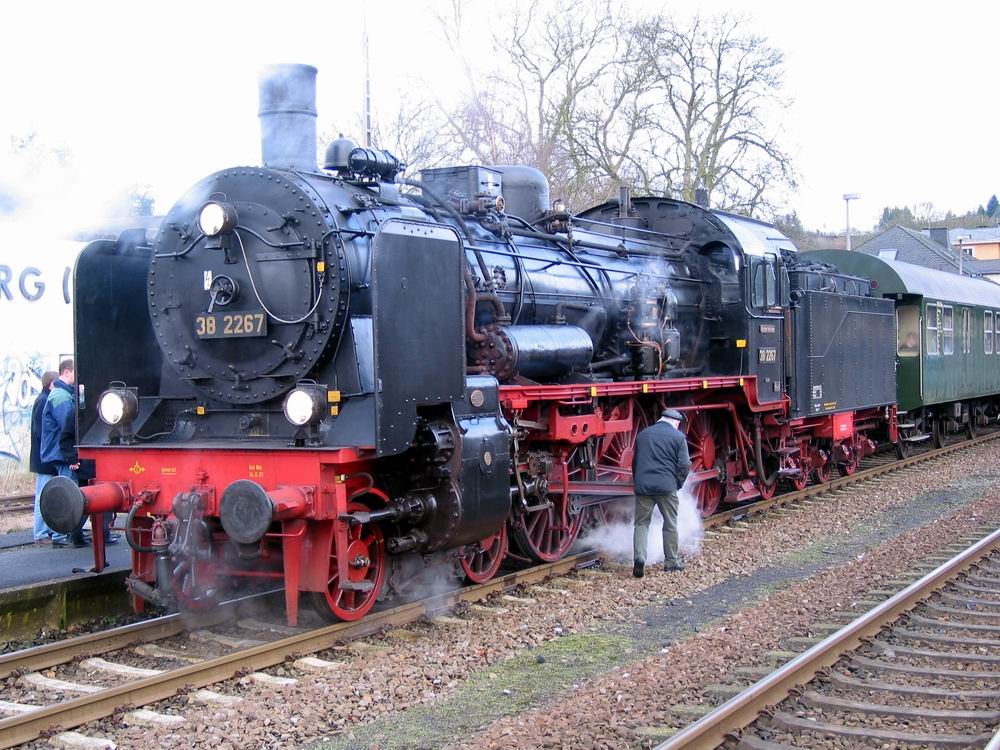
Prussian P 8 of the museum – built in 1918

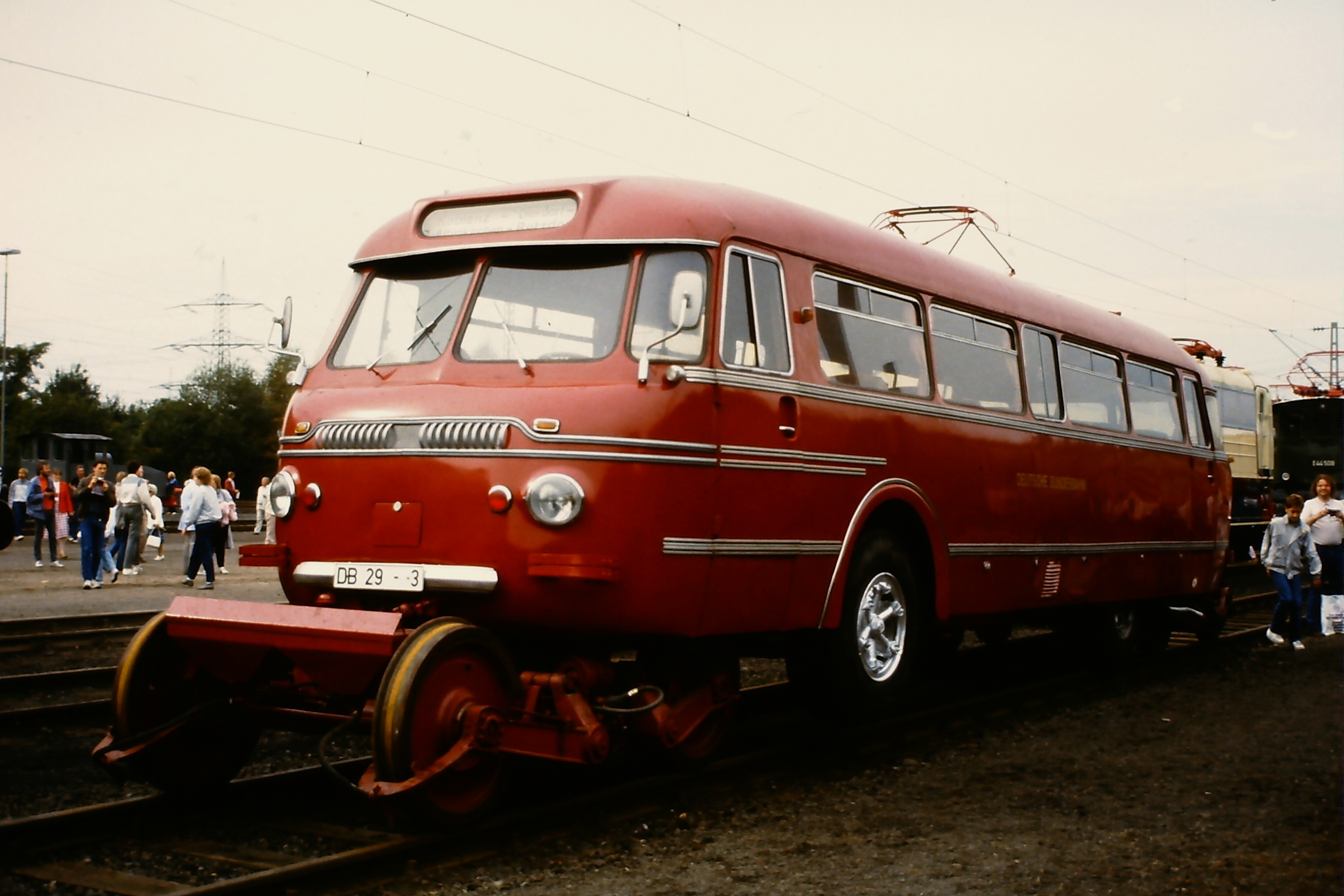
The railbus in the Bochum-Dahlhausen Railway Museum

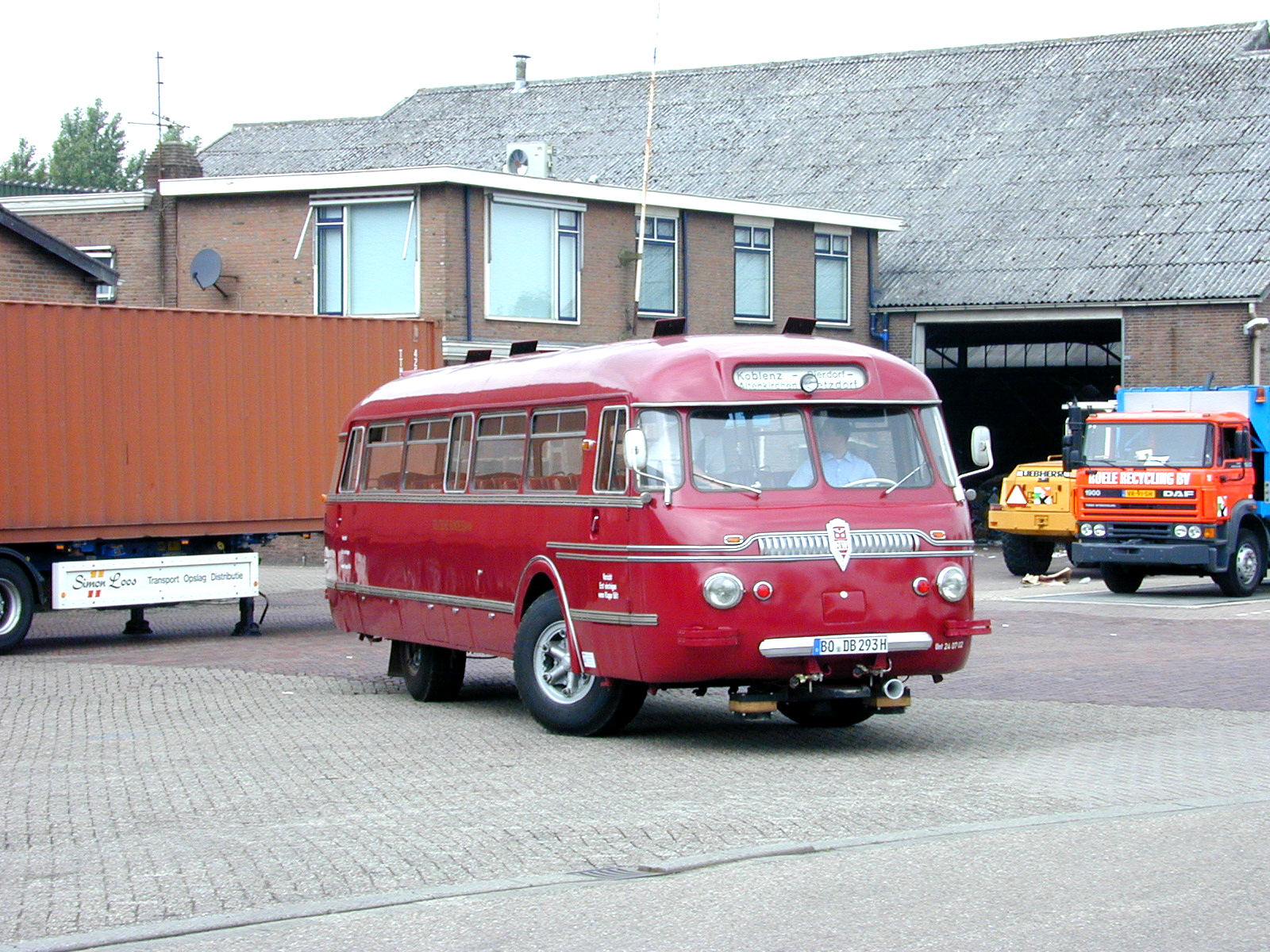
The museum vehicle on the road

== See also ==
- History of rail transport in Germany
- DGEG (Deutsche Gesellschaft für Eisenbahngeschichte), the German Railway History Company
- Neustadt/Weinstrasse Railway Museum

== Literature ==
- Vogelsang, Harald (2002) – Die Fahrzeuge und Anlagen des Eisenbahnmuseums Bochum-Dahlhausen : Museumsführer. Bochum : DGEG-Eisenbahnmuseum Bochum-Dahlhausen gGmbH. ISBN 3-921700-99-X
- Vogelsang, Harald. Das BW Bochum-Dahlhausen und die Eisenbahn im mittleren Ruhrtal. Eisenbahnkurier Verlag, ISBN 3-88255-430-4
