= Kaarster Bahnhof station =

Railway station in Kaarst, Germany

Kaarster Bahnhof
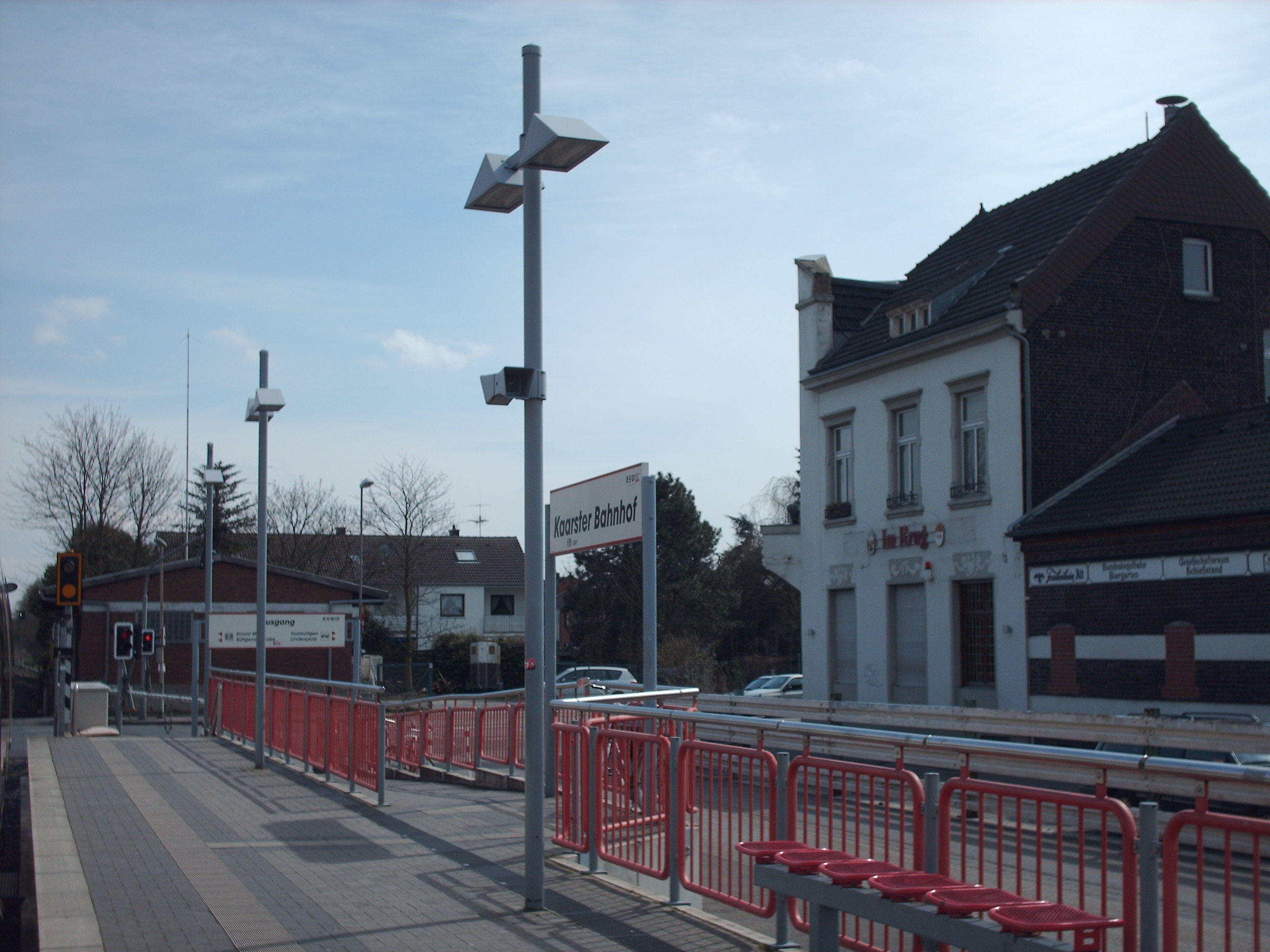
- Kaarster Bahnhof railway station

General information
- Location: Kaarst, North Rhine-Westphalia, Germany
- Coordinates: 51°13′22″N 6°36′25″E
- System: Kaarst
- Line: Neuss–Viersen railway
- Platforms: 1
- Tracks: 1

Construction
- Accessible: Yes

Other information
- Fare zone: VRR: 528; VRS: 1520 (VRR transitional tariff)
- Website: www.regiobahn.de

Services
Preceding station	Rhine-Ruhr S-Bahn	Following station
Kaarster See Terminus	S28	Kaarst Mitte/Holzbüttgen towards Wuppertal Hbf
Location

Kaarster Bahnhof (German: Kaarster Bahnhof) (formerly Kaarst railway station) is a railway station in the town of Kaarst, North Rhine-Westphalia, Germany. The station lies on the Neuss–Viersen railway and the train services are operated by Regiobahn.

== Train services ==
The station is served by the following services:

- Rhine-Ruhr S-Bahn S28 Kaarster See - Neuss - Düsseldorf - Mettmann Stadtwald
