= Kaarst Mitte/Holzbüttgen station =

Railway station in Germany

Kaarst Mitte/Holzbüttgen
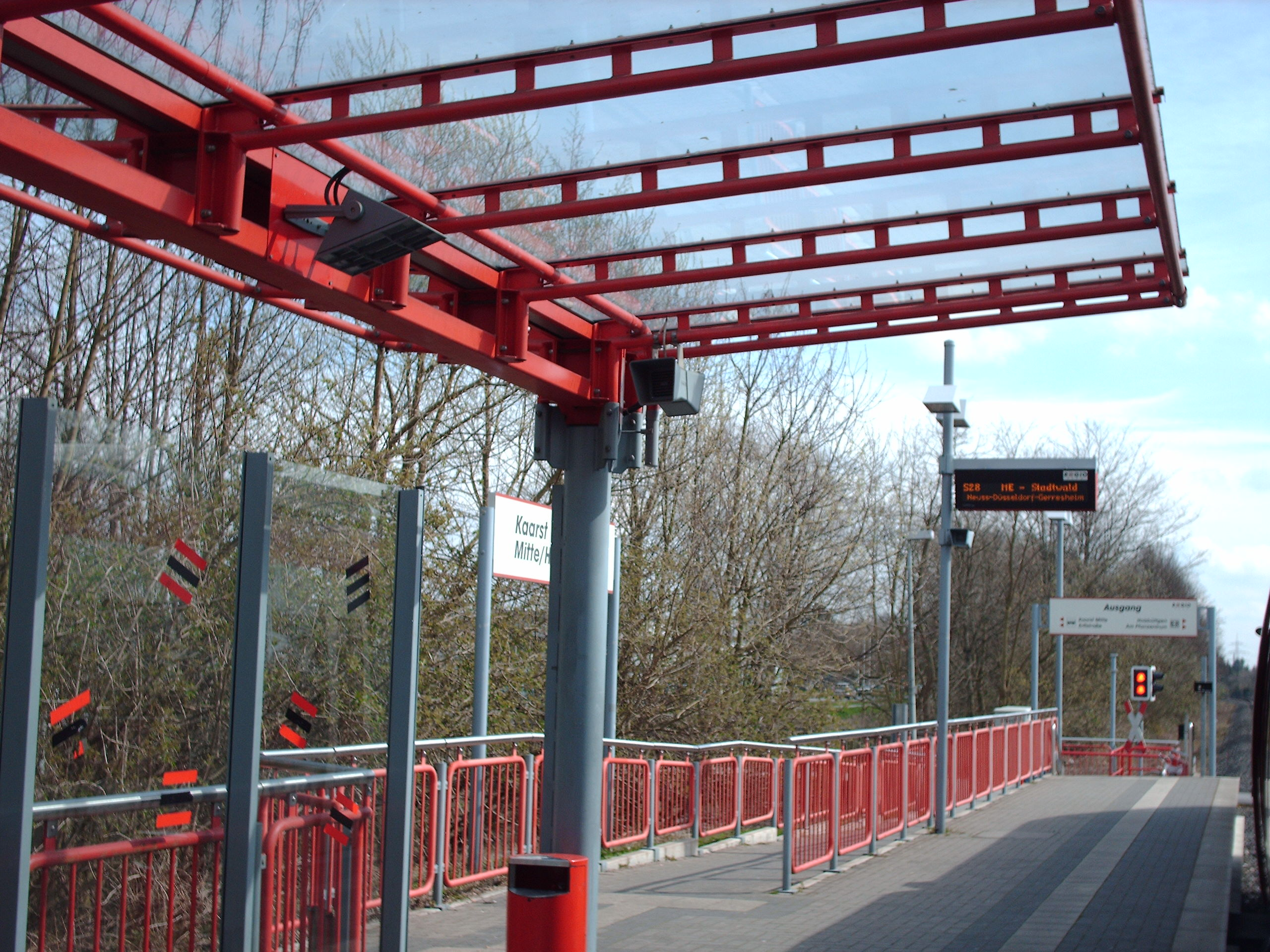

General information
- Location: Kaarst, North Rhine-Westphalia; Germany
- Coordinates: 51°13′10″N 6°37′03″E
- System: Through station
- Line: Neuss–Kaarster See S28
- Platforms: 1

Construction
- Accessible: Yes

Other information
- Station code: n/a
- DS100 code: KKMI
- IBNR: 8000432
- Fare zone: VRR: 528; VRS: 1520 (VRR transitional tariff)
- Website: www.regiobahn.de

History
- Opened: 1985/87

Services
Preceding station	Rhine-Ruhr S-Bahn	Following station
Kaarster Bahnhof towards Kaarster See	S28	Kaarst IKEA towards Wuppertal Hbf
Location

Kaarst Mitte/Holzbüttgen is a Rhine-Ruhr S-Bahn station in the town of Kaarst in the German state of North Rhine-Westphalia. It was opened as Kaarst Erftstr between 1985 and 1987 on the remaining part of the Neuss–Viersen railway, which was opened by the Rhenish Railway Company on 15 November 1877. It was given its current name on 26 September 1999.

The station is served by Rhine-Ruhr S-Bahn line S 28 at 20-minute intervals

The station is served by one bus service, SB51 (Neersener Str), operated by Rheinbahn at 30- to 60-minute intervals and one taxibus service, 861 (Sandberg – Neusser Str), operated by Busverkehr Rheinland at 60-minute intervals.
