= Kaarst IKEA station =

Railway station in Kaarst, Germany

Kaarst IKEA
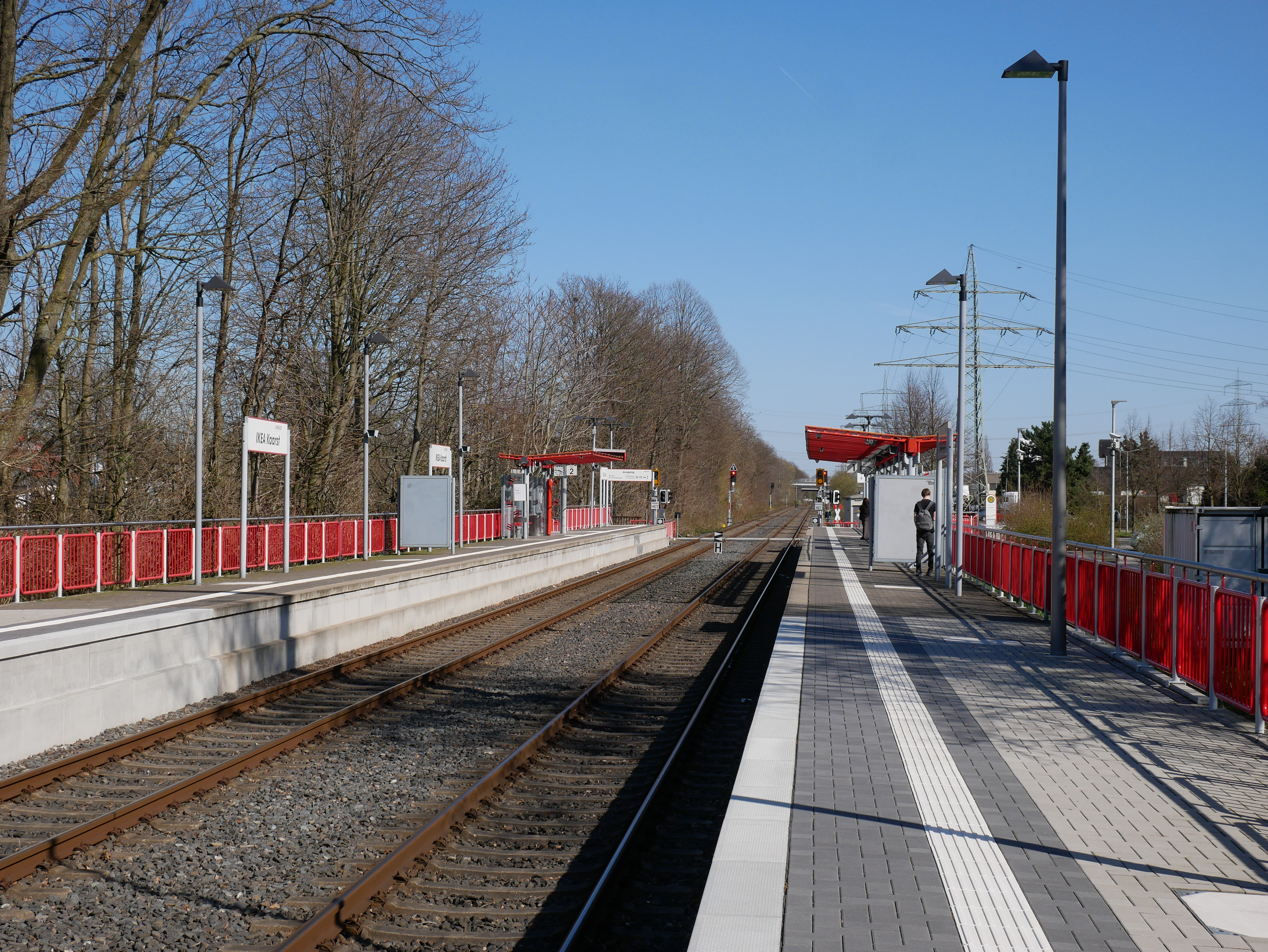

General information
- Location: Kaarst, North Rhine-Westphalia; Germany
- Coordinates: 51°13′00″N 6°37′47″E
- System: Through station
- Line: Neuss–Kaarster See S28
- Platforms: 2

Construction
- Accessible: Yes

Other information
- Station code: n/a
- DS100 code: KKAI
- IBNR: 8000438
- Fare zone: VRR: 528; VRS: 1520 (VRR transitional tariff)
- Website: www.regiobahn.de

History
- Opened: 1954/57 \

Services
Preceding station	Rhine-Ruhr S-Bahn	Following station
Kaarst Mitte/Holzbüttgen towards Kaarster See	S28	Neuss Hbf towards Wuppertal Hbf
Location

Kaarst IKEA station is a Rhine-Ruhr S-Bahn station in the town of Kaarst in the German state of North Rhine-Westphalia. It was opened as Holzbüttgen between 1954 and 1957 on the remaining part of the Neuss–Viersen railway, which was opened by the Rhenish Railway Company on 15 November 1877. It was reopened as IKEA Kaarst (after the nearby IKEA store) on 26 September 1999 and given its current name on 16 June 2002.

The station is served by Rhine-Ruhr S-Bahn line S 28 at 20-minute intervals

The station is served by one taxibus service, 861 (Holzbüttgen/Sandfeld – Neusser Str), operated by Busverkehr Rheinland at 60-minute intervals.

After the IKEA store moved its location in 2017, the station was not renamed, but started to offer a shuttle bus service to the new IKEA store.
