= Hahnenfurth/Düssel station =

Railway station in Wuppertal, Germany

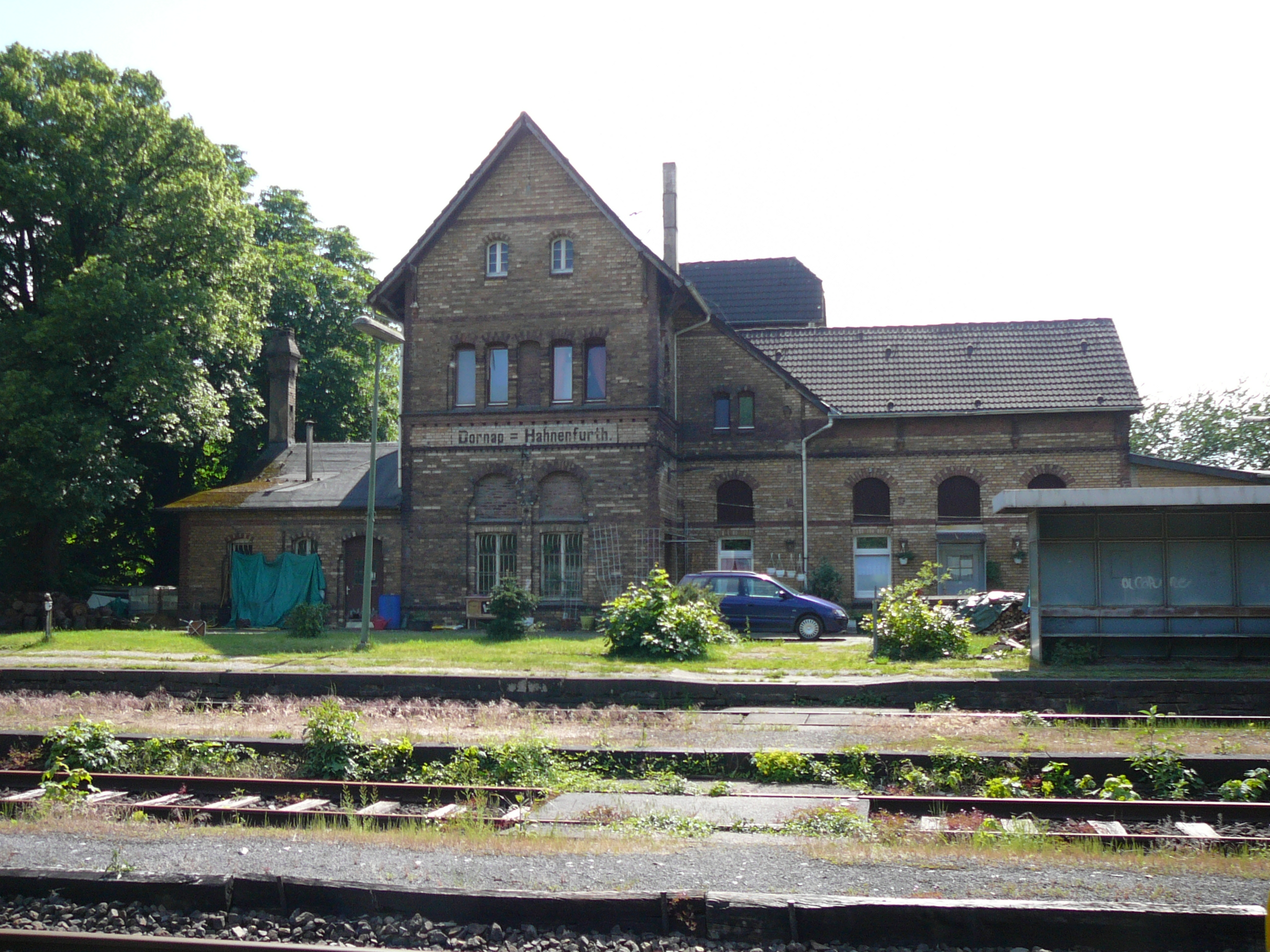
- Former Dornap-Hahnenfurth station from the tracks

General information
- Location: Dornap, Wuppertal, North Rhine-Westphalia; Germany
- Coordinates: 51°15′14″N 7°03′19″E
- Lines: Düsseldorf-Derendorf–Dortmund Süd (KBS 450.28)
- Platforms: 2

Construction
- Accessible: Yes

Other information
- Station code: n/a
- Category: N/A
- Website: www.regiobahn.de

History
- Opened: 13 December 2020

Services
Preceding station	Rhine-Ruhr S-Bahn	Following station
Mettmann Stadtwald towards Kaarster See	S28	Wuppertal-Vohwinkel towards Wuppertal Hbf
Location
- Location within North Rhine-Westphalia Location within Germany Location within Europe

Hahnenfurth/Düssel station is located in the district of Dornap, Wuppertal, in the German state of North Rhine-Westphalia. The station was opened on a new section of line connecting Mettmann Stadtwald and the Wuppertal-Vohwinkel–Essen-Überruhr railway on 13 December 2020. There was formerly a nearby station called Dornap-Hahnenfurth on the Düsseldorf-Derendorf–Dortmund Süd railway, which was opened by the Rhenish Railway Company on 15 September 1879 and closed on 23 August 1991.

The station is served by line S 28 of the Rhine-Ruhr S-Bahn, running between Wuppertal Hauptbahnhof and Kaarster See, operating every 20 or 40 minutes, alternatively, during the day.
