= Neuss Hauptbahnhof =

Railway station in Neuss, North Rhine-Westphalia

Neuss Hbf
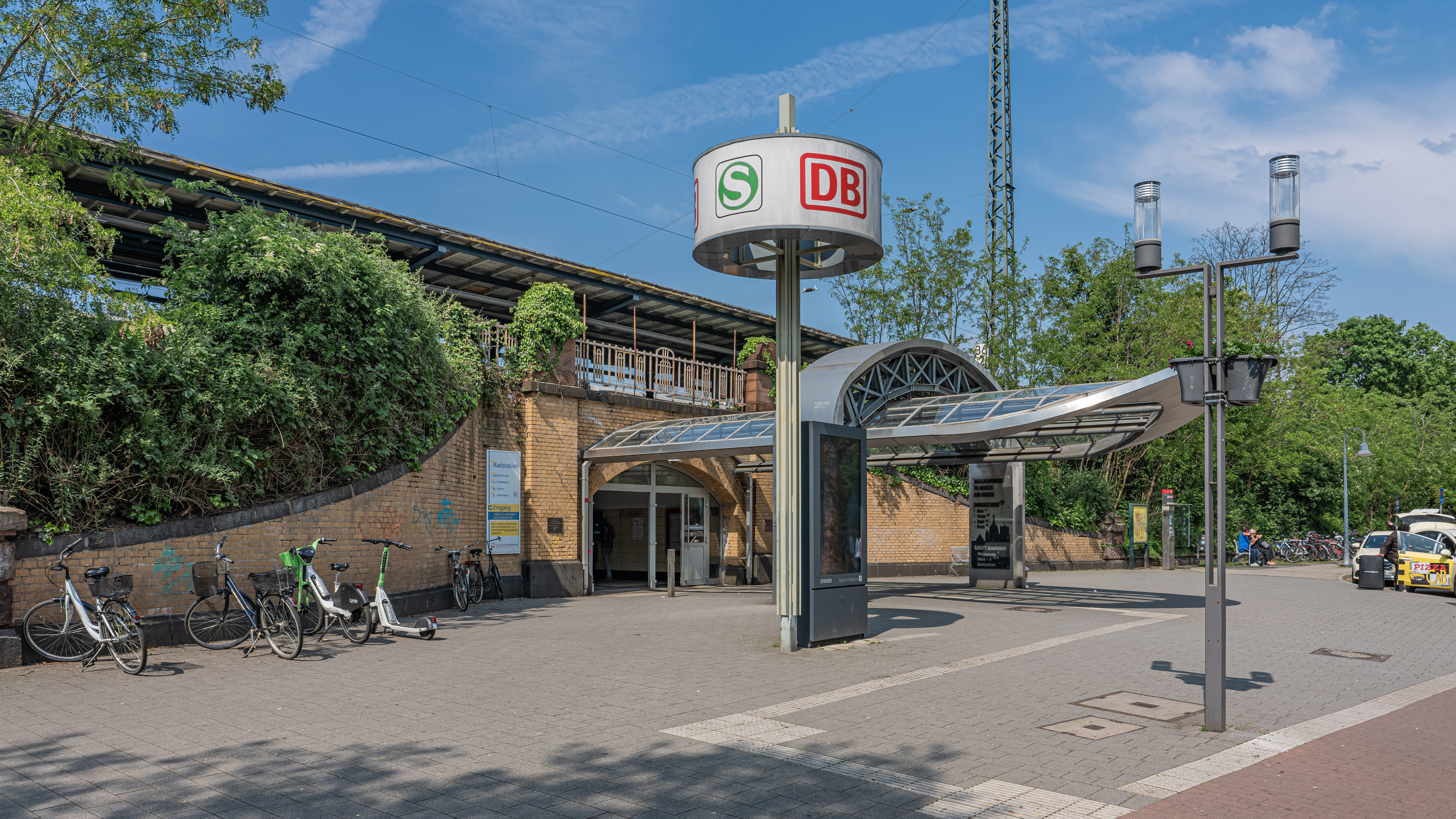
- Station exit

General information
- Location: Further Str. 1 Neuss, Rhein-Kreis Neuss, NRW; Germany
- Coordinates: 51°12′14″N 6°41′02″E
- Lines: Mönchengladbach–Düsseldorf; Cologne–Kleve; Düren–Neuss; Neuss–Kaarst
- Platforms: 4
- Tracks: 8

Construction
- Accessible: Yes

Other information
- Station code: 4440
- DS100 code: KN
- IBNR: 8000274
- Category: 2
- Fare zone: VRR: 520; VRS: 1520 (VRR transitional zone)
- Website: www.bahnhof.de

History
- Opened: 1853

Services
Preceding station	DB Fernverkehr	Following station
Mönchengladbach Hbf towards Aachen Hbf	ICE 10	Düsseldorf Hbf One-way operation
Preceding station	National Express Germany	Following station
Mönchengladbach Hbf towards Aachen Hbf	RE 4 (Wupper-Express)	Düsseldorf-Bilk towards Dortmund Hbf
Dormagen towards Cologne/Bonn Airport	RE 6 (Rhein-Weser-Express)	Düsseldorf-Bilk towards Minden
Dormagen towards Rheine	RE 7 (Rhein-Münsterland-Express)	Meerbusch-Osterath towards Krefeld Hbf
Preceding station		Following station
Mönchengladbach Hbf towards Venlo	RE 13	Düsseldorf-Bilk towards Hamm (Westf) Hbf
Preceding station	VIAS	Following station
Holzheim towards Bedburg	RB 39	Düsseldorf-Bilk towards Düsseldorf Hbf
Preceding station	Rhine-Ruhr S-Bahn	Following station
Büttgen towards Mönchengladbach Hbf	S8	Neuss Am Kaiser towards Hagen Hbf
Kaarst IKEA towards Kaarster See	S28	Neuss Am Kaiser towards Wuppertal Hbf
Preceding station	Cologne S-Bahn	Following station
Neuss Süd towards Bergisch Gladbach	S11	Neuss Am Kaiser towards Düsseldorf Airport Terminal
Preceding station	Rhine-Ruhr Stadtbahn	Following station
Terminus	U75	Blücherstraße towards Eller Vennhauser Allee
Location

Neuss Central Station (Neuss Hauptbahnhof) is the railway station for the city of Neuss in the German state of North Rhine-Westphalia. The main station building is built on a platform between the tracks and it is located at the junction of the Lower Left Rhine Railway (Linksniederrheinische Strecke, Cologne–Kleve) and the Mönchengladbach–Düsseldorf railway. These lines also connect with the Düren–Neuss railway and the Neuss–Viersen railway; the latter has ended since 1984 at Kaarster See station and is operated by the private Regiobahn company.

The station is a transport hub, served by various rail services, a Stadtbahn line, a tram line and a bus station with eight bays in the station forecourt. Neuss station houses several shops, including a restaurant, a snack bar and a kiosk. In 2006, it was modernised, with two of its four platforms equipped with lifts for wheelchair users. It is classified by Deutsche Bahn as a category 2 station.

== History ==
Neuss station was opened in 1853, along with the line from Aachen. A rail connection to Cologne followed in 1855. In 1875/76, the second station building was built. The current station building was opened at the same location in 2003. The station was extensively remodelled with the opening of the Rhine-Ruhr S-Bahn lines S11 (opened in 1985) and S 8 (1988).

=== Remodelling ===
The planning firm of Jaspert, Steffens, Watrin und Drehsen of Cologne was commissioned with the development of a concept design for the development of the station in cooperation with the city of Neuss. The focus was mainly on the station forecourt, the entrance building, the transport facilities of the station itself and its environment. The concept consists of eight modules, which could be realised independently. The so-called Masterplan NRW also provided for the development of the rail infrastructure. Deutsche Bahn, the Verkehrsverbund Rhein-Ruhr and the state of North Rhine-Westphalia signed up to the plan was on 11 December 2008. The modernisation plan was funded with €767,000. In the second stage of the operation, Modernisierungsoffensive (modernisation drive) 2, Neuss station was rebuilt in the 2nd half of 2012. Among other things, all platforms gained a lift, the floor covering was renewed and auxiliary systems for the visually impaired were installed.

== Operations ==
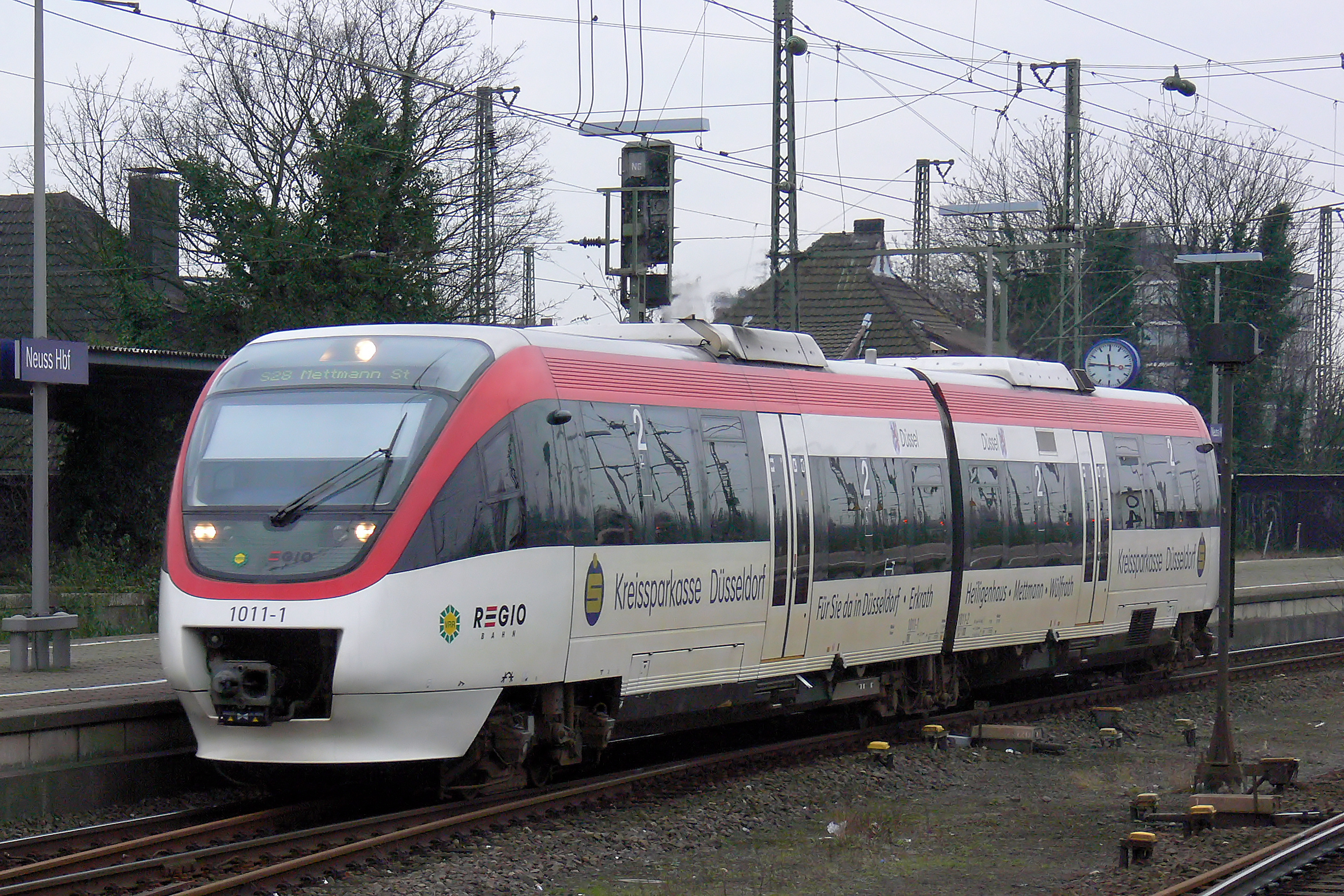
Talent of Regiobahn in Neuss station

=== Long-distance services ===
Since the timetable change in December 2009, Neuss Hauptbahnhof has again been served by long-distance services:

- An Intercity-Express connects Neuss with Berlin Ostbahnhof (and Mönchengladbach in the other direction) on Fridays and Sundays.
- An Intercity from Aachen stops in Neuss on its journey to Berlin Südkreuz. The return trip runs from Leipzig via Neuss and continues via Mönchengladbach and Aachen to Cologne.

=== Regional services ===
The station is served by the following seven regional services (January 2017):

Line	Line name	Route
RE 4	Wupper-Express	Aachen – Mönchengladbach – Neuss – Düsseldorf – Wuppertal – Hagen – Dortmund
RE 6	Rhein-Münsterland-Express	Minden – Herford – Bielefeld – Hamm – Dortmund – Essen – Duisburg – Düsseldorf Airport – Düsseldorf Hbf – Neuss – Cologne Hbf – Cologne/Bonn Airport
RE 7	Rhein-Münsterland-Express	Krefeld – Neuss – Cologne – Solingen – Wuppertal – Hagen – Hamm (Westf) – Münster (Westf) – Rheine
RE 13	Maas-Wupper-Express	Venlo – Viersen – Mönchengladbach – Neuss – Düsseldorf Hbf – Wuppertal – Hagen – Hamm (Westf)
RB 39	Düssel-Erft-Bahn	Düsseldorf – Neuss – Grevenbroich – Bedburg
S8	S 8	Mönchengladbach – Neuss – Düsseldorf – Wuppertal – Hagen
S11	S 11	Düsseldorf Airport Terminal – Düsseldorf – Neuss – Dormagen – Cologne – Bergisch Gladbach
S28	S 28	Kaarster See – Neuss – Düsseldorf – Mettmann Stadtwald – Wuppertal Hbf

=== Platform usage ===
In general, rail services use the platforms as follows:

Platform	Line	Use
Platforms south of the island building
1	RE 6 RE 7	to Düsseldorf and Krefeld
2	RB 39	to Düsseldorf
3	RB 39	to Grevenbroich and Bedburg
4	RE 6 RE 7	to Cologne (via Dormagen)
Platforms north of the island building
5		
5/6	RE 4 RE 13 S8 S11 S28	to Düsseldorf
7/8	RE 4 RE 13 S8 S11 S28	to Mönchengladbach, Kaarst and Cologne
8	1919 (only Sunday)	to Cologne

=== Local services ===
Neuss station is served by a Stadtbahn line, a tram line, twelve bus routes and six night bus routes.

Line	Route
U75	Neuss Hauptbahnhof– Handweiser – Belsenplatz – Heinrich-Heine-Allee – Düsseldorf Hbf – Schlesische Straße (U) – Eller, Vennhauser Allee
709	Gerresheim, Krankenhaus – Grafenberg – Düsseldorf Hbf – Südfriedhof – Neuss Hauptbahnhof–Neuss Theodor-Heuss-Platz
828	Stadthalle - Neuss Hauptbahnhof - Weißenberg - Meerbusch Büderich - Heerdt-Belsenplatz
830	Stadthalle - Neuss Hauptbahnhof - Neuss Am Kaiser - Meerbusch Büderich - Haus Meer
841	Rosellerheide - Norf - Gnadental - Stadthalle - Neuss Hauptbahnhof - Neusserfurth - Handweiser
842	Rheinparkcenter - Hafen - Neuss Hauptbahnhof - Lukaskrankenhaus
843	Grefrath - Skihalle - Holzheim - Reuschenberg - Neuss Süd - Neuss Hauptbahnhof - Neusserfurth
844	Hoisten - Weckhoven - Reuschenberg - Neuss Süd - Neuss Hauptbahnhof - Neusserfurth
848	Johanna-Etienne-Krankenhaus - Neuss Hauptbahnhof - Schulzentrum - Lukaskrankenhaus
849	Erftal - Gnadental - Stadthalle - Neuss Hauptbahnhof - Lukaskrankenhaus
851	Uedesheim - Grimlinghausen - Gnadental - Stadthalle - Neuss Hauptbahnhof - Neusserfurth - Kaarst
852	Norf - Grimlinghausen - Stadthalle - Neuss Hauptbahnhof - Neusserfurth - Kaarst
854	Weckhoven - Selikum - Gnadental - Stadthalle - Neuss Hauptbahnhof - Weißenberg - Vogelsang
857T	Neuss Hauptbahnhof - Bauerbahn
NE1	Neuss Hauptbahnhof - Stadthalle - Alexianerplatz - Gnadental - Grimlinghausen - Neuss Wehl - Neuss Speck
NE2	Neuss Hauptbahnhof - Pomona - Reuschenberg - Holzheim - Grefrath über Skihalle
NE3	Grefrath über Skihalle - Holzheim - Reuschenberg - Pomona - Neuss Hauptbahnhof - Vogelsang - Böhmerstr.
NE4	Stadthalle - Neuss Hauptbahnhof - Neusserfurth - Kaarst Maubisstr.
NE5	Neuss Hauptbahnhof - Stadthalle - Alexianerplatz - Gnadental - Grimlinghausen - Taubental - Neuss Uedesheim Deichstraße
NE6	Neuss Hauptbahnhof - Stadthalle - Alexianerplatz - Gnadental - Reuschenberg - Weckhoven - Hoisten Schleife

==== Planning ====
The new Düsseldorf Stadtbahn line, U81, is planned from the commercial area of Hammelfeld or possibly from Rheinpark-Center station via Neuss station and continuing via Lörick, the Messe Düsseldorf and the Düsseldorf Airport to Ratingen. This project is currently postponed due to lack of funding.
