= Mettmann Stadtwald station =

Railway station in Mettmann, Germany

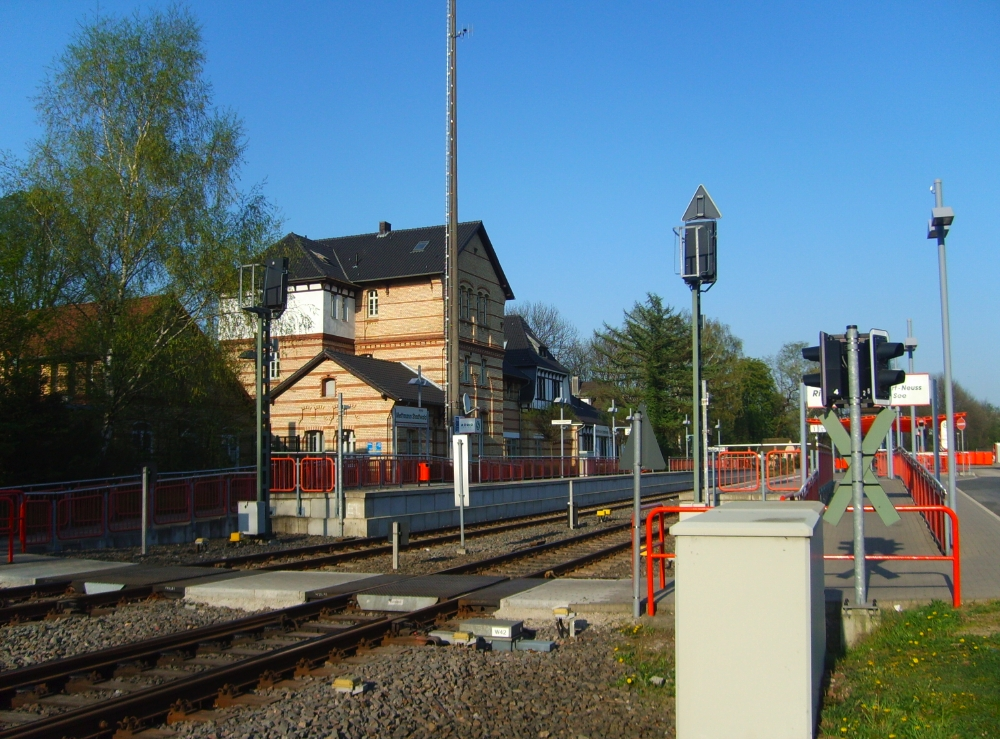

General information
- Location: Mettmann, North Rhine-Westphalia; Germany
- Coordinates: 51°15′03″N 6°59′16″E
- Lines: Düsseldorf-Derendorf–Dortmund Süd (KBS 450.28) S28
- Platforms: 2

Construction
- Accessible: Yes

Other information
- Station code: n/a
- DS100 code: KME
- Category: N/A
- Fare zone: VRR: 540
- Website: www.regiobahn.de

History
- Opened: 26 September 1999

Services
Preceding station	Rhine-Ruhr S-Bahn	Following station
Mettmann Zentrum towards Kaarster See	S28	Hahnenfurth/Düssel towards Wuppertal Hbf
Location
- Location within North Rhine-Westphalia Location within Germany Location within Europe

Mettmann Stadtwald station is located in the town of Mettmann in the German state of North Rhine-Westphalia at the end of a fragment of the Düsseldorf-Derendorf–Dortmund Süd railway, opened by the Rhenish Railway Company. The line and the station were opened on 15 September 1879. It was originally called Mettmann, but was renamed to its current name on 26 September 1999. The line is served by line S 28 of the Rhine-Ruhr S-Bahn.

The station is served by line S 28, running between Mettmann Stadtwald and Kaarster See, operating every 20 minutes during the day. Two out of three services run to/from Wuppertal Hauptbahnhof.

It is also served by eight bus routes operated by Rheinbahn (some with Kreisverkehrsgesellschaft Mettmann): SB68 (60 minute intervals), O10 (60), O11 (irregular), O13 (20), 742 (20–60), 745 (30–60), 746 (20) and 749 (60).
