= Integral (train) =

German diesel-multiple-unit train type

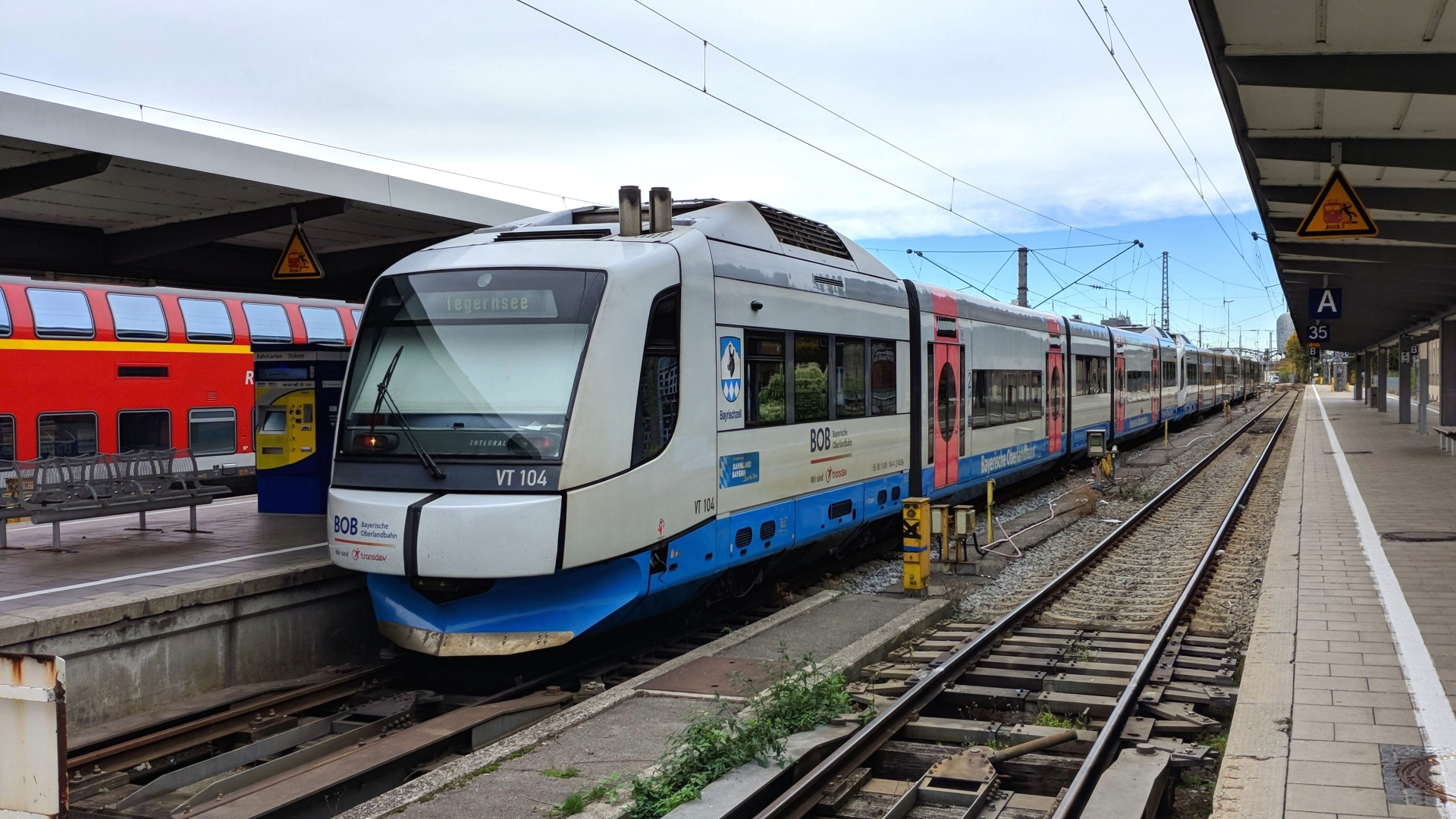
- Integral set VT 104 at München Hauptbahnhof in November 2018
- In service: November 1998 – July 2020; December 2020 – present
- Manufacturer: Jenbacher Werke
- Number built: 17 sets
- Formation: 5 sections per trainset
- Operators: Bayerische Oberlandbahn (-2020); Regiobahn GmbH (2020-)

Specifications
- Prime mover(s): Diesel-hydraulic
- Bogies: 6 single wheelsets
- Track gauge: 1,435 mm (4 ft 8 1/2 in)

The Integral is a diesel multiple unit (DMU) train type operated by Regiobahn GmbH on commuter services in North Rhine-Westphalia. Between 1998 and 2020, they were operated by the Bayerische Oberlandbahn on regional services between Munich, Bayrischzell, Lenggries and Tegernsee. They were built by the now defunct Jenbacher Werke.

== Formation ==
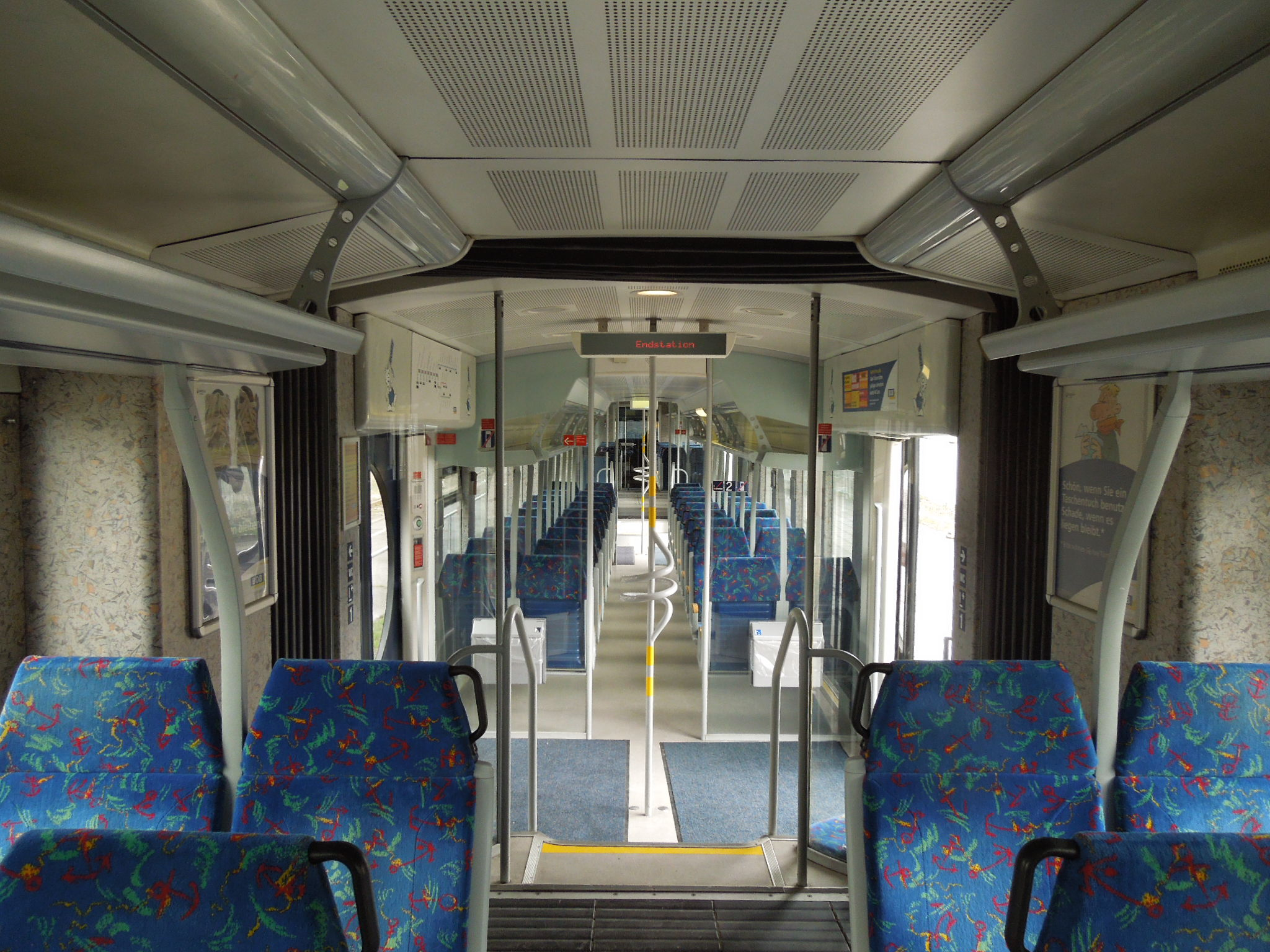
Interior view

Each Integral unit consists of five sections, formed as shown in table below. The two "FGZ" sections are suspended between the end- and intermediate cars.

Car	Endwagen 2 end car 2	Fahrgastzelle passenger section	Mittelwagen intermediate car	Fahrgastzelle passenger section	Endwagen 1 end car 1
Designation	EW2	FGZ	MW	FGZ	EW1
Equipment	Diesel-hydraulic motor		Two unpowered wheelsets		Diesel-hydraulic motor
Wheelsets	2	none	2	none	2

== Technical specifications ==
The trains are powered by diesel-hydraulic motors. One end car has all wheelsets powered, the other end car has only one powered wheelset. All six wheelsets use active radial steering. The trains are able to run in multiple unit formation.

== History ==
The trains entered service in November 1998. Following problems and malfunctions, the fleet was returned to its manufacturer in Jenbach, and was overhauled, which increased their reliability.

One unit was used at the Test- and Validationcenter Wegberg-Wildenrath for testing of an anti-collision system by the Deutsches Zentrum für Luft- und Raumfahrt (DLR).

The Integral trains were withdrawn by Bayerische Oberlandbahn after their last day of service on July 25, 2020, being replaced by LINT 54 units.

After their withdrawal from service in Bavaria, Integral trains were transferred to the Regiobahn GmbH in North Rhine-Westphalia, where they entered service on VRR S-Bahn line S28 in December 2020.

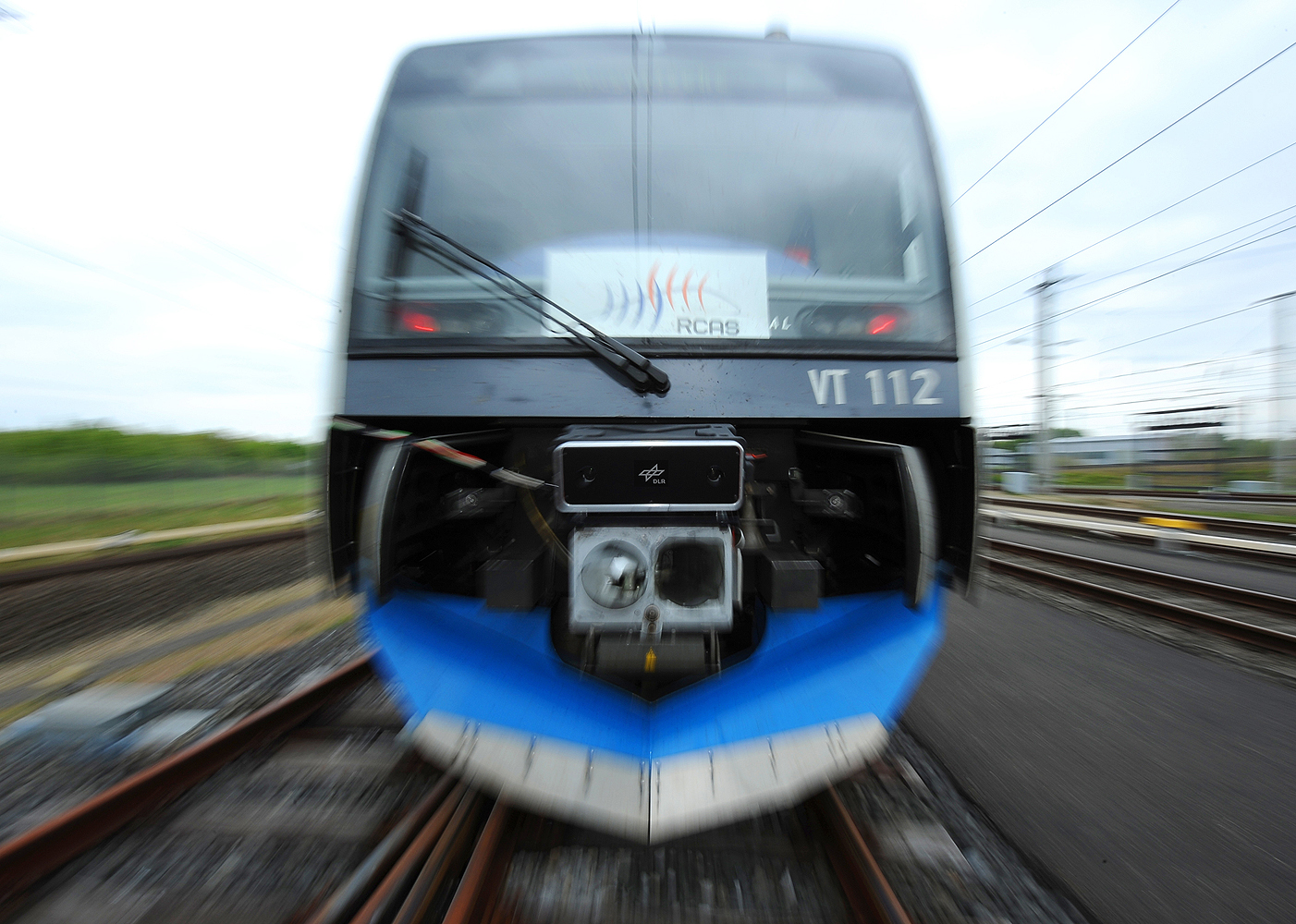
Anti-collision device experimentally fitted to an Integral unit

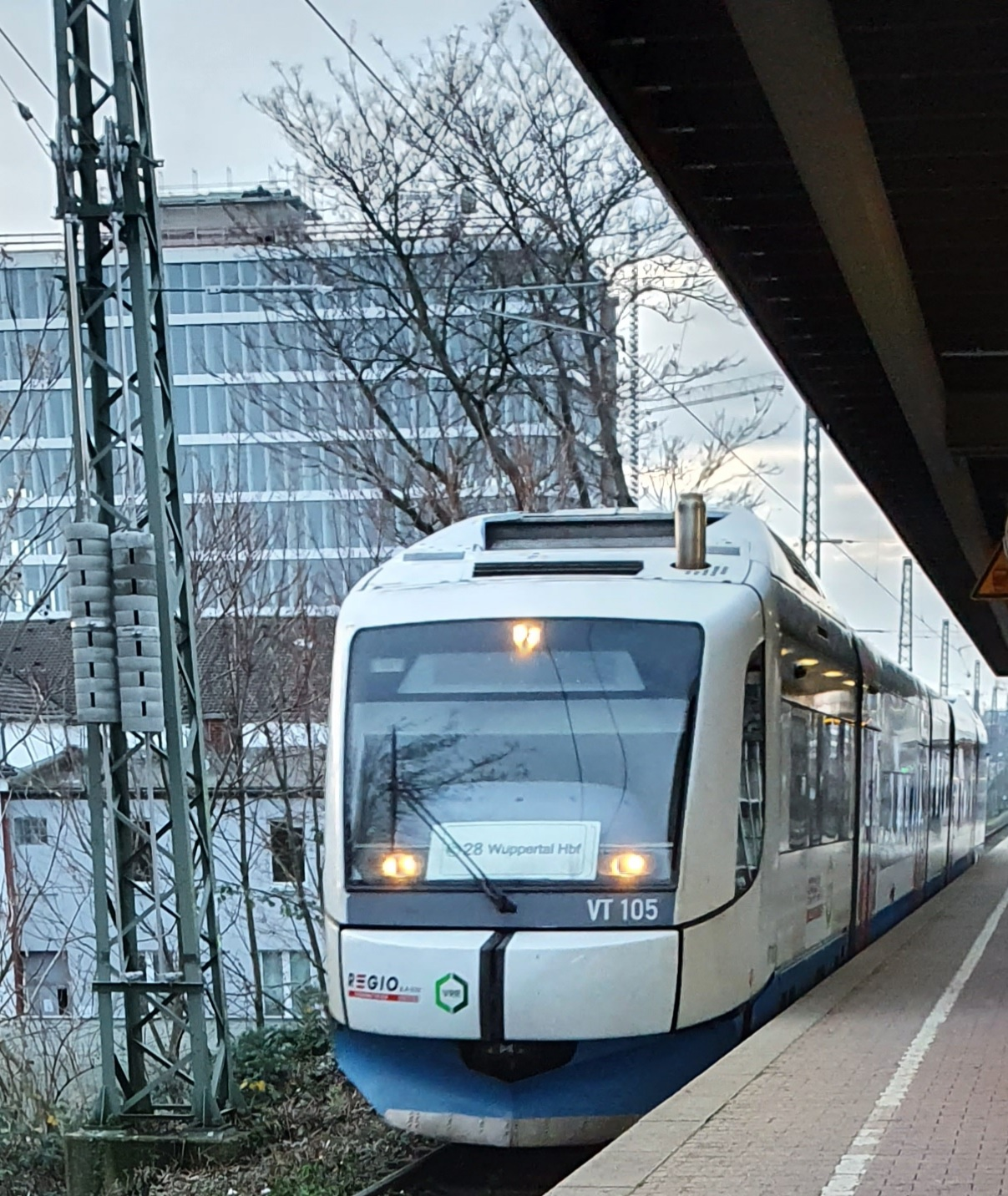
Regiobahn Integral on an S28 service to Wuppertal
