= Neuss–Viersen railway =

Railway line in Germany

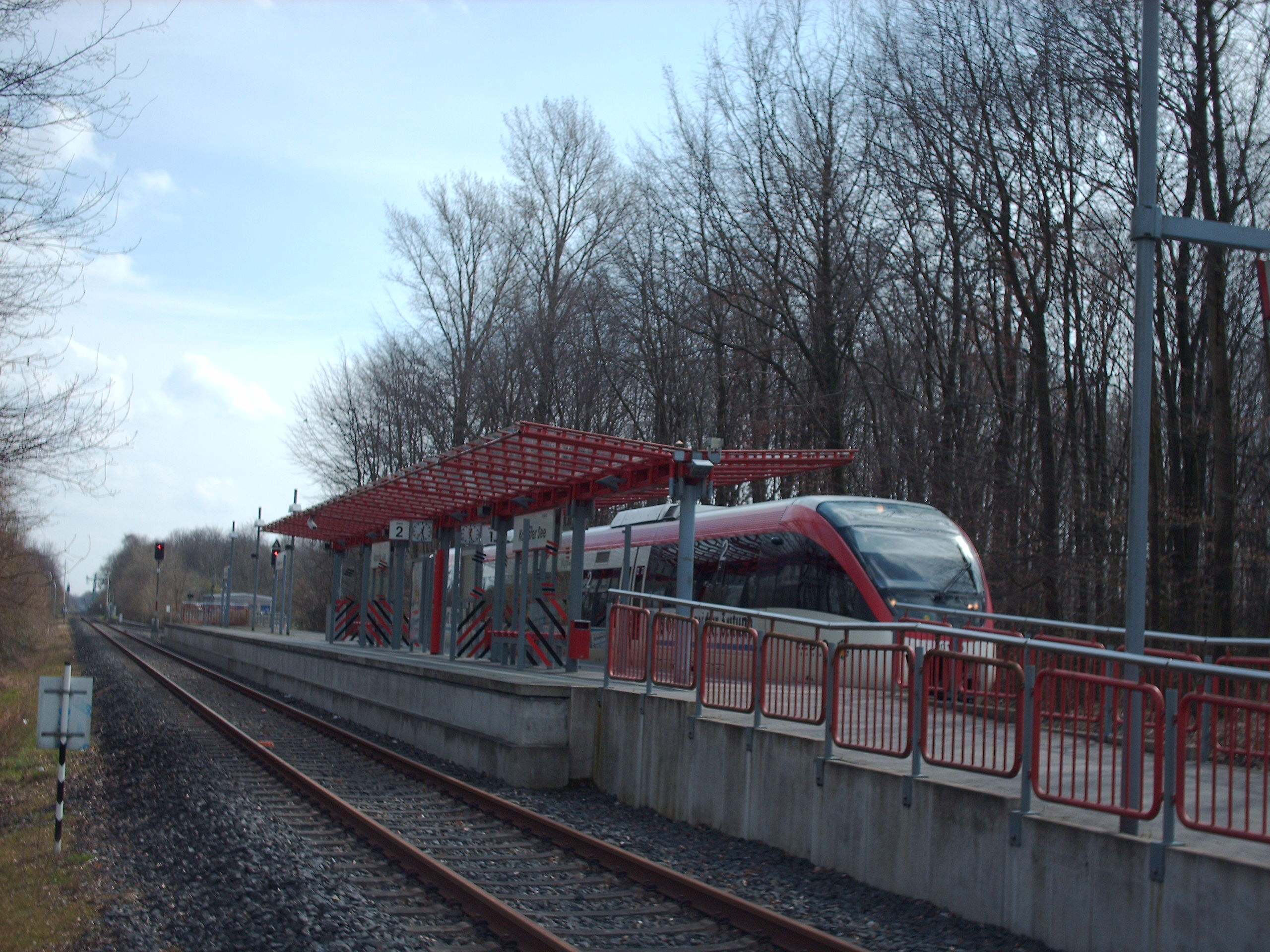
- Kaarster See station

Overview
- Line number: 2530 (Neuss – Neersen); 2511 (Neersen – Viersen)
- Locale: North Rhine-Westphalia, Germany

Service
- Route number: 450.28 (Neuss – Kaarst)

Technical
- Line length: 22 km (14 mi)
- Track gauge: 1,435 mm (4 ft 8 1/2 in) standard gauge
- Operating speed: 110 km/h (68 mph)

The Neuss–Viersen railway is a mostly disused railway line in the German state of North Rhine-Westphalia. It formerly ran from Neuss via Kaarst and Neersen to Viersen, but now ends in Kaarst.

Most of the line still in operation is a single track and non-electrified branch line. A shorter section, however, is operated as part of the Duisburg-Ruhrort–Mönchengladbach line and is a two-track, electrified mainline railway.

== History ==
The Rhenish Railway Company (German: Rheinische Eisenbahn-Gesellschaft, RhE) built a line from its Lower Left Rhine Railway at Neuss station to Viersen largely parallel with the Mönchengladbach–Düsseldorf and the Duisburg-Ruhrort–Mönchengladbach lines of the Bergisch-Märkische Railway Company (Bergisch-Märkische Eisenbahn-Gesellschaft, BME), which had taken over the Aachen-Düsseldorf-Ruhrort Railway Company (Königliche Direction der Aachen-Düsseldorf-Ruhrorter Eisenbahn), which built the Duisburg-Ruhrort–Mönchengladbach line. On 15 November 1877, the section from Neuss to Neersen was completed on the same day as the Krefeld–Rheydt line. The remaining section to Viersen RhE station was opened on 1 November 1878.

== Economic importance ==
As with many of the RhE’s other projects, the route was built as directly as possible in order to provide a shorter travel time than the already established lines in order to gain market share. Only limited traffic was attracted to the new line, especially passenger traffic, because the line did not connect with Mönchengladbach BME station (now Mönchengladbach Hauptbahnhof), which was very important for rail traffic. The low passenger traffic, in particular, meant that the line could not be operated economically, even after the opening of a connecting line between the Krefeld–Rheydt line at Mönchengladbach-Neuwerk and Mönchengladbach Hauptbahnhof in 1909. Passenger services were closed from Kaarst on 29 September 1968 and freight operations ended in 1984.

== Integration of lines ==
Since the opening of the Rhenish station in 1878 in Viersen, the RhE and BME stations were near each other. For the first few years after the nationalisation of the two railway companies nothing changed, then in 1887 passenger operations were moved from the RhE station to the BME station.

30 years later, all passenger operations at the Viersen station were moved back to the location of the former Rhenish station, after the former straight line of the BME route between Mönchengladbach and Viersen was abandoned in favour of a new curved route built further east. This connected to the former Rhine route between Viersen RhE station and Neersen at the 4.6 km mark. The line from this point to Viersen station is still a two-track main line and has been electrified since 1964.

== Current operations ==
The section between Neuss Hauptbahnhof and Kaarster See is operated by Regiobahn GmbH as line S 28 of the Rhein-Ruhr S-Bahn using Bombardier Talent diesel multiple units. From the terminus at Kaarster See to the former junction with the rerouting of the line in 1917 between Mönchengladbach and Viersen the line is completely closed and mostly dismantled. The Nordkanal bike path was built on part of the disused section. The section that is still in operation is owned by Regiobahn.

== Future ==
Currently there are plans to reactivate the former line and extend S-Bahn services to Neersen. In addition, there are plans and ideas for two different versions:

1. Complete reactivation of the line and the extension of line S 28 via Neersen to Viersen and Venlo. A planning report on this project was supported by the Rhein-Maas-Nord Euroregion with a grant of € 34,000.
1. Reconstruction of the section of the former Krefeld–Rheydt line between Neersen and Mönchengladbach-Neuwerk and restoring the line from there to Mönchengladbach Hauptbahnhof.

Furthermore, the feasibility of a station at Neuss Nord or Neuss Morgensternheide between Neuss Hauptbahnhof and Kaarst IKEA is being examined.
