= Regiobahn GmbH =

- Company type: GmbH
- Founded: 1992
- Headquarters: Mettmann, Germany
- Area served: Germany
- Services: Passenger transportation
- Website: www.regio-bahn.de

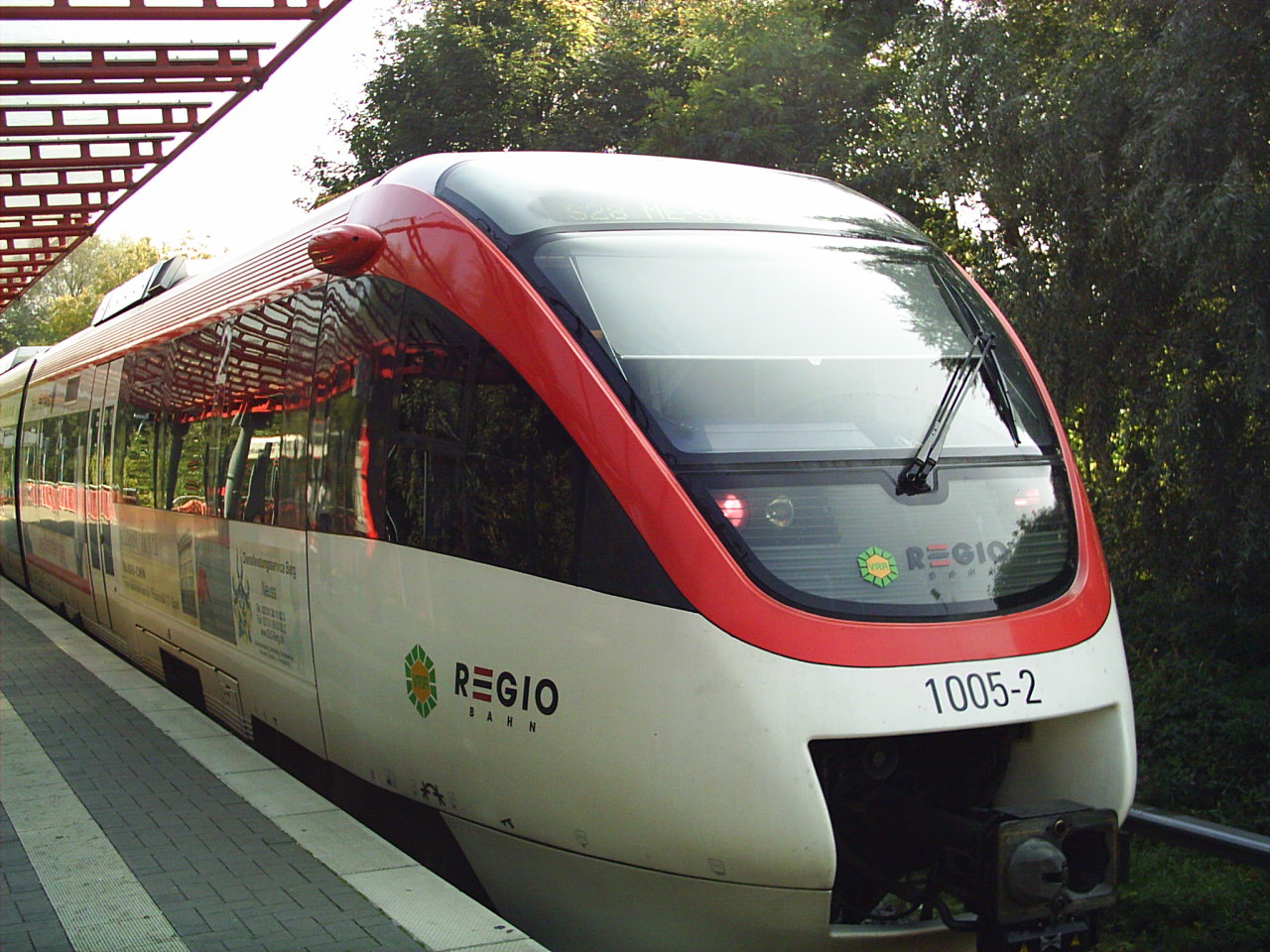
Regiobahn train at Kaarster See

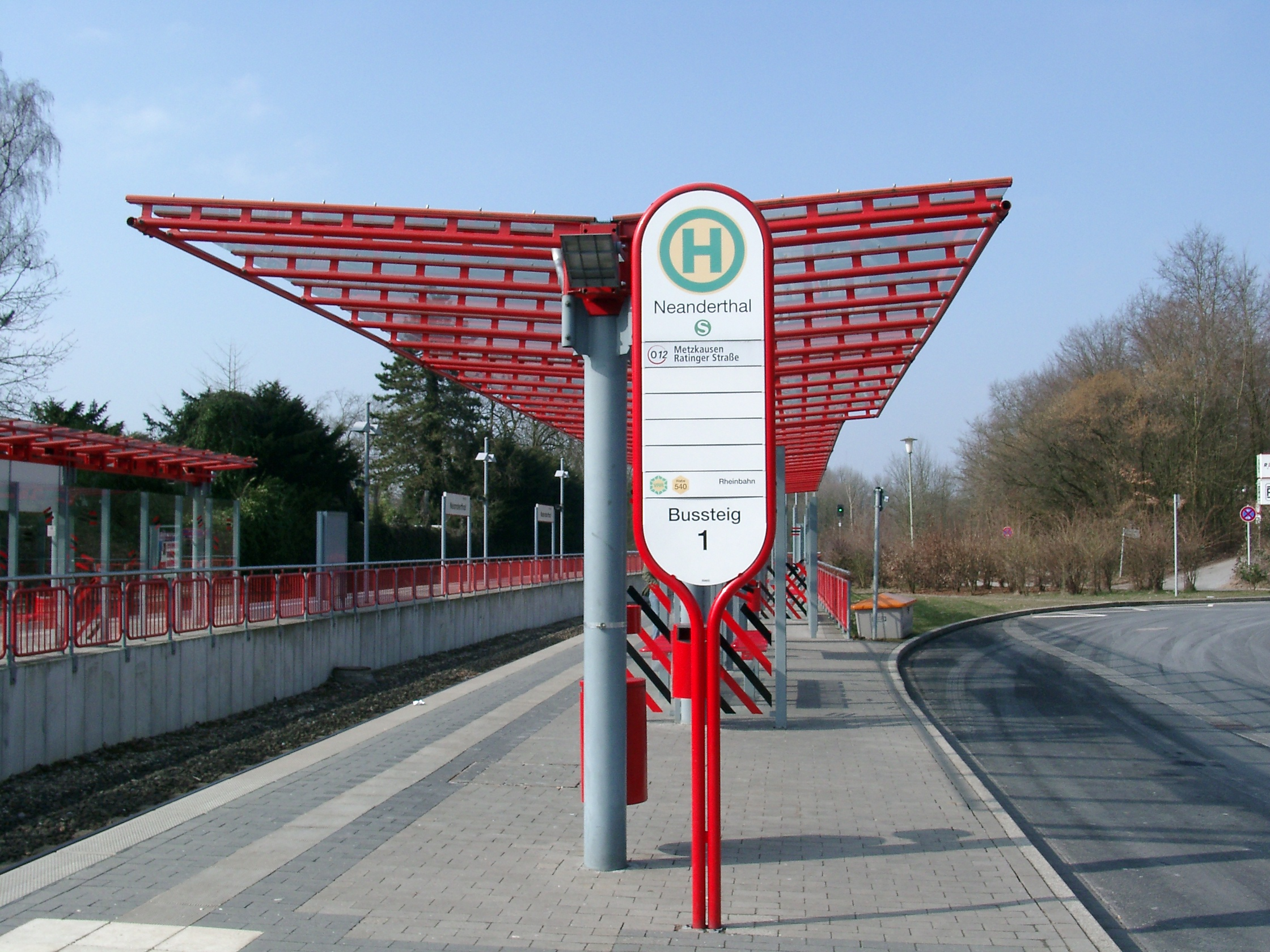
Neanderthal train (and bus) station of the S28 Mettmann - Düsseldorf - Kaarst RegioBahn

The Regiobahn is the operator of the S28 line of the Rhine-Ruhr S-Bahn between Kaarst, Düsseldorf, Mettmann and Wuppertal and the RE 47 between Düsseldorf and Remscheid-Lennep in the state of North Rhine-Westphalia, Germany.

There are three companies involved in the Regiobahn operations:

- Regionale Bahngesellschaft Kaarst-Neuss-Düsseldorf-Erkrath-Mettmann-Wuppertal mbH (shortened as Regiobahn GmbH) is the railway infrastructure manager between Kaarst and Neuss, and between Düsseldorf-Gerresheim and Wuppertal-Dornap junction.
- Regiobahn Fahrbetriebsgesellschaft mbH is the company that holds the contract with Verkehrsverbund Rhein-Ruhr to operate the S28 and RE 47 services as public service obligations.
- RBE Rheinisch-Bergische Eisenbahn is the brand name of Transdev Rheinland GmbH, which has been contracted to operate the train service on behalf of Regiobahn Fahrbetriebsgesellschaft mbH.

== History ==
The Regionale Bahngesellschaft Kaarst-Neuss-Düsseldorf-Erkrath-Mettmann-Wuppertal mbH was incorporated on 8 August 1992 by its constituent cities and districts. The company is owned as follows:

- 35 %: city of Düsseldorf
- 20.0 %: city of Mettmann
- 11.8 %: Rhein-Kreis Neuss
- 11.6 %: Stadtwerke Neuss (the public transport operator and supplier of natural gas, district heating and water of the city of Neuss)
- 11.6 %: city of Kaarst
- 10.0 %: Wuppertaler Stadtwerke (the public transport operator and supplier of electricity, natural gas, district heating and water of the city of Wuppertal)

On 1 January 1998 Regiobahn GmbH took over the infrastructure of the railway lines from Neuss to Kaarst and from Düsseldorf-Gerresheim to Mettmann from Deutsche Bahn.

From 24 September 1998, it renovated the western section and operated it as a regional line. Passenger services continued to be operated on the eastern section until 2 January 1999. The foundation stone for the new service was laid at Mettmann station on 13 March 1999.

On 26 September 1999 operations commenced on the route between Mettmann and Kaarst initially running hourly (at 60 minute intervals) and from 28 May 2000, running at 20 minute intervals.

On 7 November 2005, Regiobahn Fahrbetriebsgesellschaft mbH was incorporated as a company to hold the PSO train operations contract with Verkehrsverbund Rhein-Ruhr. Regiobahn Fahrbetriebsgesellschaft mbH is a company owned by 39% city of Düsseldorf, 26% Rhein-Kreis Neuss, 22% Mettmann district, 12,8 % city of Kaarst. It subcontracts the operations of the trains to Transdev Rheinland GmbH. Formerly, Rheinisch-Bergische Eisenbahngesellschaft mbH was a separate company from 1999 until 2006, when it was merged with Veolia Verkehr Rheinland, laterly becoming Transdev.

In December 2013, the state of North Rhine-Westphalia agreed to finance 33.7 million of 41.1 million euros to extend the railway from Mettmann Stadtwald to Wuppertal-Vohwinkel via a new connecting curve to the Wuppertal-Vohwinkel–Essen-Überruhr railway, including a new station at Wuppertal-Hahnenfurth/Düssel. On 13 December 2020, that extension opened.

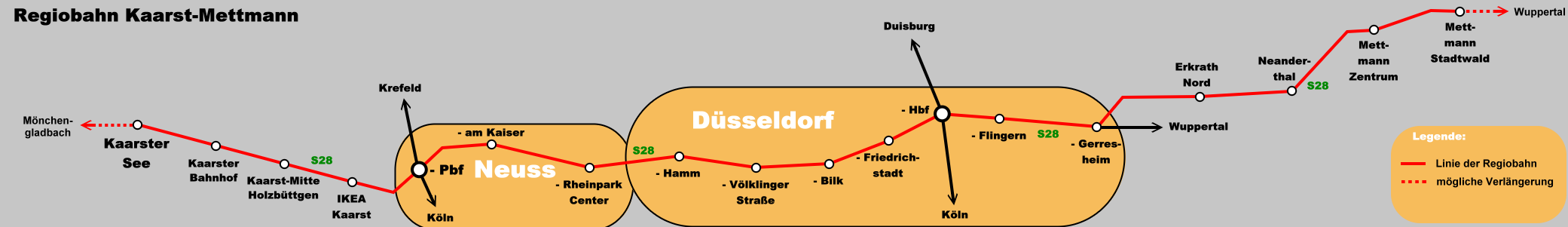
Route map

== See also ==
- S28 (Rhine-Ruhr S-Bahn)
- Transdev Germany
