= Rhine-Ruhr S-Bahn =

German railway network covering the Rhine-Ruhr region

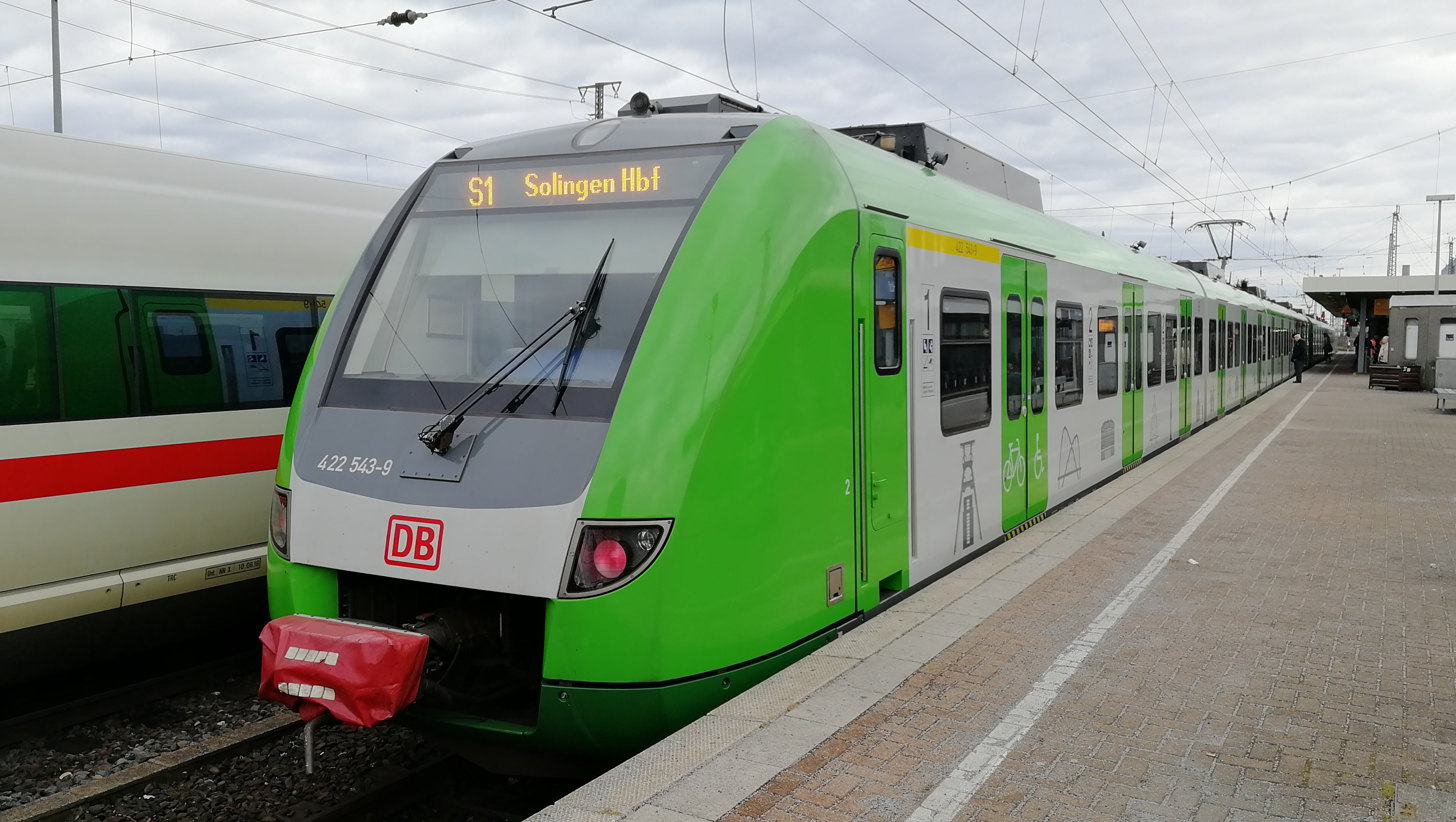
- DBAG Class 422 type at Dortmund Hauptbahnhof

Overview
- Locale: Rhine-Ruhr, North Rhine-Westphalia, Germany
- Transit type: S-bahn
- Number of lines: 11
- Number of stations: 181
- Annual ridership: 130 million Düsseldorf/Rhine-Ruhr: 98 million Cologne: 32 million
- Headquarters: Düsseldorf, Germany
- Website: www.s-bahn-rhein-ruhr.de www.s-bahn-koeln.de

Operation
- Began operation: 1967
- Operators: DB Regio NRW, Regiobahn (S28), RheinRuhrBahn (S7)
- Headway: 15/20/30 min.

Technical
- System length: 475 km (295.15 mi)
System map
Rhine-Ruhr S-Bahn network map including the Cologne S-Bahn

The Rhine-Ruhr S-Bahn (German: S-Bahn Rhein-Ruhr) is a polycentric S-bahn network covering the Rhine-Ruhr Metropolitan Region in the German federated state of North Rhine-Westphalia. This includes most of the Ruhr (and cities such as Dortmund, Duisburg and Essen), the Berg cities of Wuppertal and Solingen and parts of the Rhineland (with cities such as Cologne and Düsseldorf). The easternmost city within the S-Bahn Rhine-Ruhr network is Unna, the westernmost city served is Mönchengladbach.

The S-Bahn operates in the areas of the Verkehrsverbund Rhein-Ruhr and Verkehrsverbund Rhein-Sieg tariff associations, touching areas of the Aachener Verkehrsverbund (AVV) at Düren and Westfalentarif at Unna. The network was established in 1967 with a line connecting Ratingen Ost to Düsseldorf-Garath. Its coverage overlaps with the Cologne S-Bahn.

The system consists of 11 lines. Most of them are operated by DB Regio NRW, while line S28 is operated by Regiobahn and S7 by RheinRuhrBahn. S28 and S7 are two non-electrified lines of the network. The S1 runs 24/7 between Dortmund and Dusseldorf, while the S2 has a 24/7 service between Dortmund and Essen.

== Rolling stock history ==
=== Age of steam ===
The predecessor of the S-Bahn was the so-called Bezirksschnellverkehr between the cities of Düsseldorf and Essen, which consisted of steam-powered push-pull trains, mainly hauled by Class 78, since 1951 also Class 65 engines.

=== Early electric years ===
The first S-Bahn lines were operated using Silberling cars and Class 141 locomotives. However these were not suited for operations on a rapid transit network and were soon replaced by Class 420 electric multiple units.

Originally designed for the Munich S-Bahn, the Class 420 was judged in the mid-1970s to be unsuitable for the network, mainly due to being uncomfortable and lacking on-board toilets.

=== The x-Wagen era ===
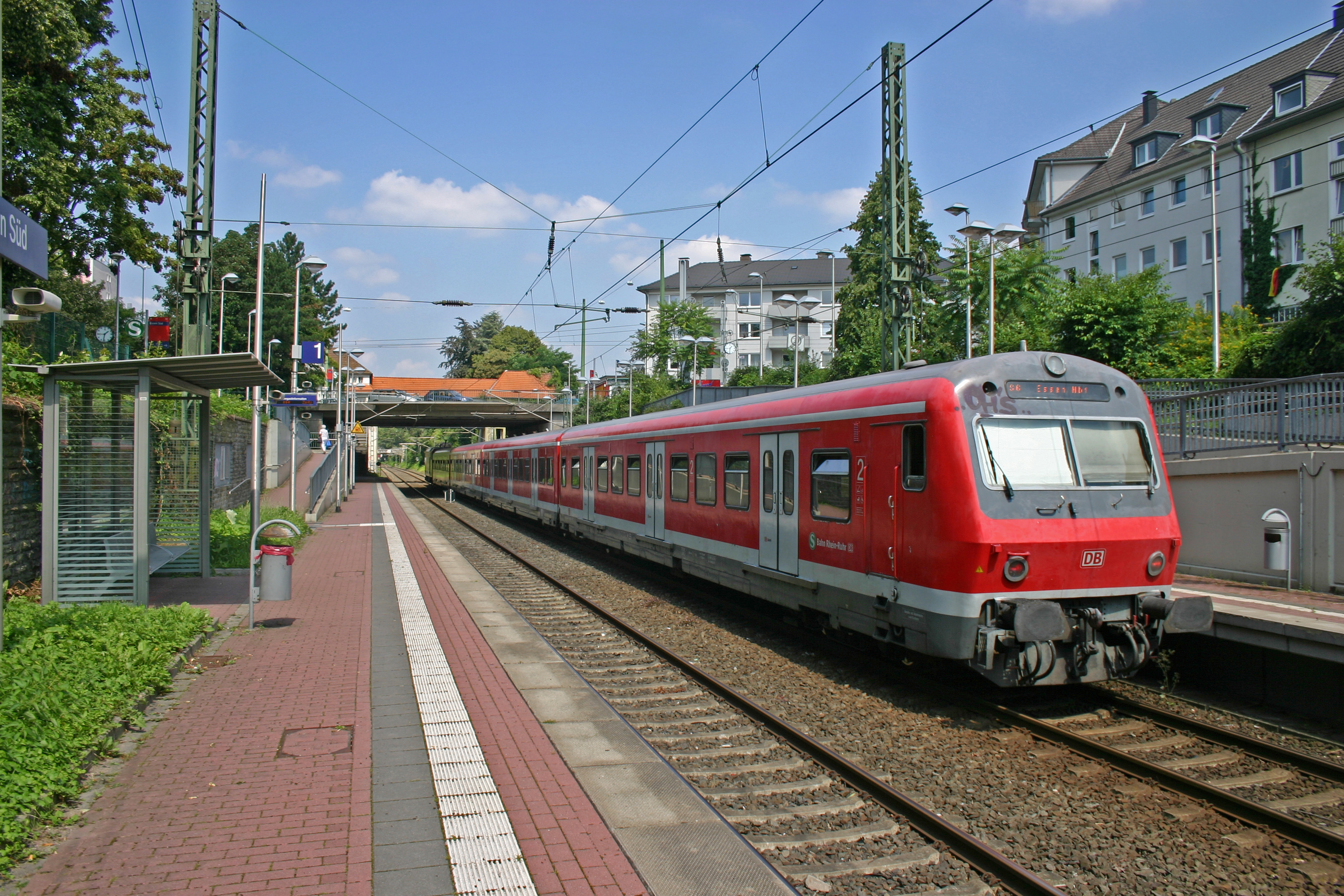
An X-Wagen control car at Essen Süd in July 2014

Constructing an improved version of the 420 with the tentative designation Class 422 was discussed, but in 1978 the Deutsche Bundesbahn commissioned a batch of coaches from Duewag and MBB. These lightweight and modern coaches were designated as x-Wagen ("x-car") after their classification code Bx. Among the design elements inherited from the recent LHB prototype carriages were the bogies with disc brakes and rubber airbag shock absorbers that also included automated level control, ensuring level boarding from S-Bahn platforms with a standard height of 96 cm regardless of varying passenger loading.

In late 1978, the first prototypes of 2nd class type Bx ^{794.0} cars and Bxf ^{796.0} control cars were handed over to DB, followed by split first/second class cars type ABx ^{791.0} in early 1979. The prototypes were successful, so from 1981 to 1994 several series were commissioned, with some going to the Nuremberg S-Bahn system.

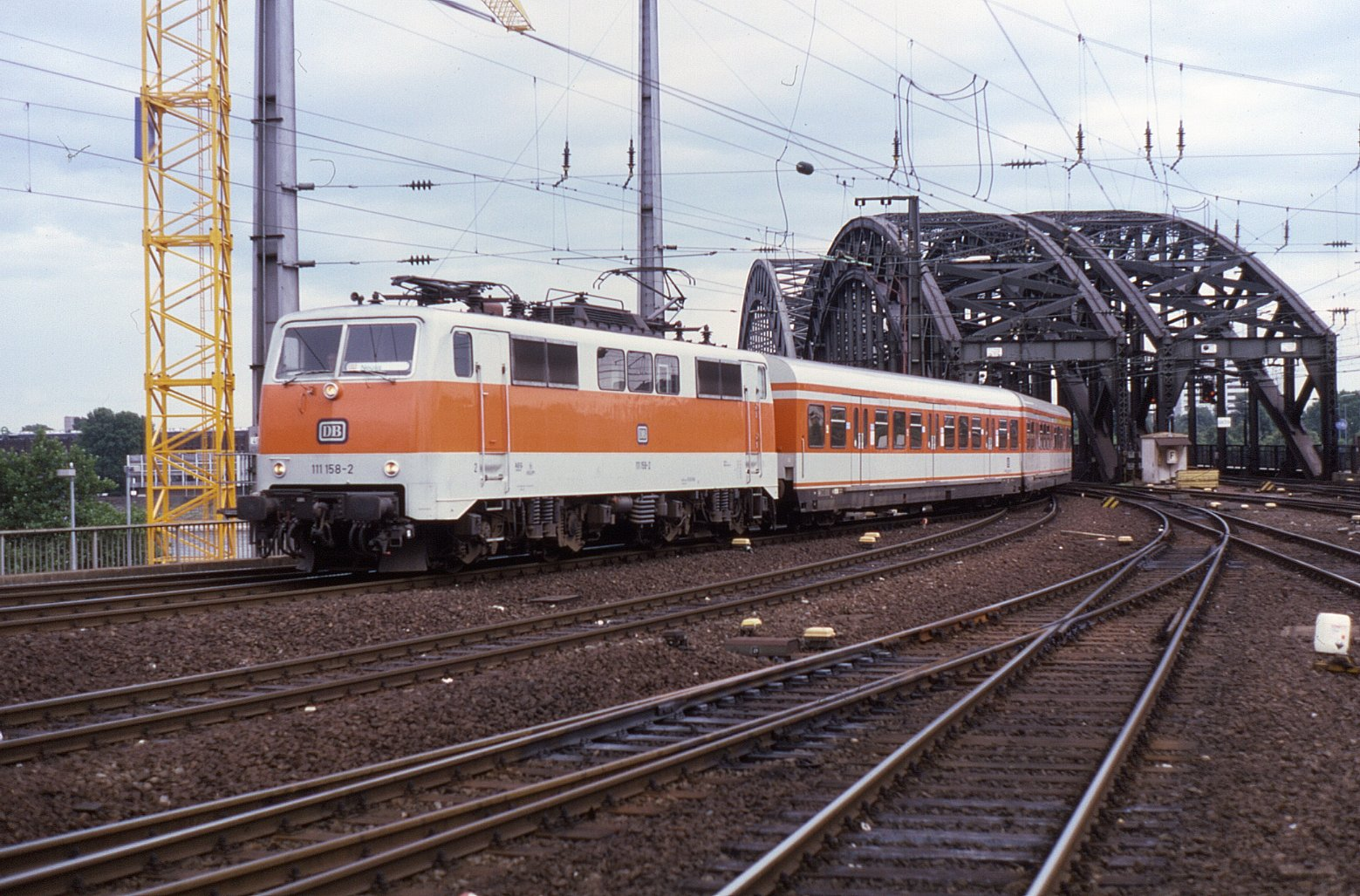
A Class 111 locomotive leads an orange-and-white S-Bahn service across the Hohenzollernbrücke into Köln Hauptbahnhof in 1985

The x-Wagen were mechanically coupled to form fixed sets of typically one ABx car, one or two Bx cars and one Bxf control car. This way a train offered seating for a total of 222 to 302 passengers and standing room for another 429 to 539 passengers. A few five-car sets ran on peak time services. All cars were of a walk-through design with mechanical doors at each end. Initially the ABx car ran on the loco end to keep passengers looking for a seat from disturbing first-class passengers. The orientation of trains was not predictable in practice however, so the ABx car was instead put in the middle of the train. In later years, when insufficient numbers of Bx cars were ready for service, some trains ran with two ABx cars.

Traction was provided by the Class 111 locomotives produced locally by Krupp in Essen. They had been designed for long-haul Intercity and limited-stop commuter train services with a maximum speed of 160 km/h (99 mph) and were not an ideal fit for rapid transit duty. After the German reunification, even before the old Deutsche Bundesbahn was merged with the Deutsche Reichsbahn of East Germany to form the new Deutsche Bahn, the Class 143 Reichsbahn engines replaced the Class 111 on the S-Bahn network, limiting the top speed on the network to 120 km/h (75 mph) but with better acceleration and noticeably less jolting.

=== Rolling stock today ===
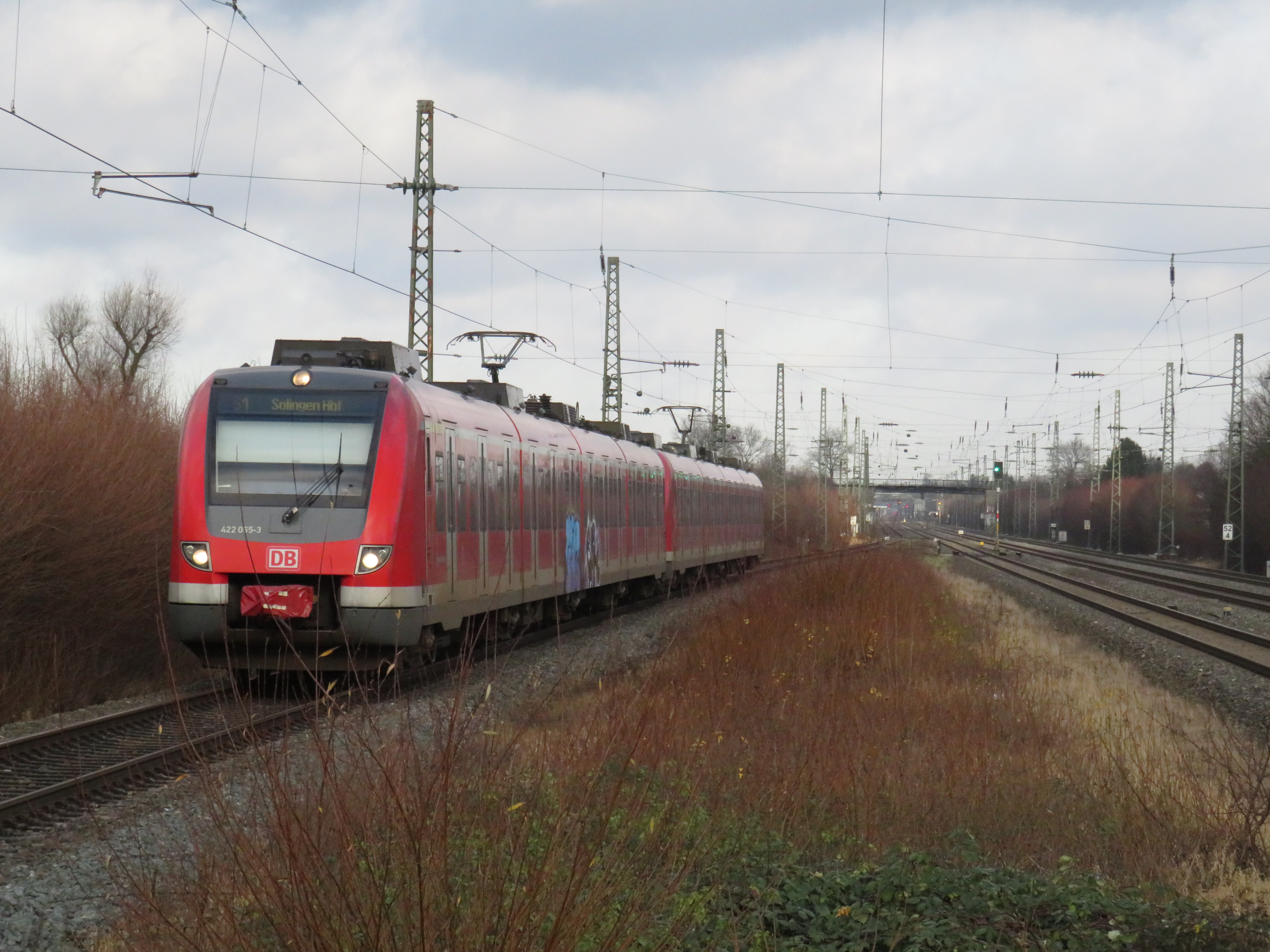
S-Bahn Rhein-Ruhr Series 422 at Angermund station

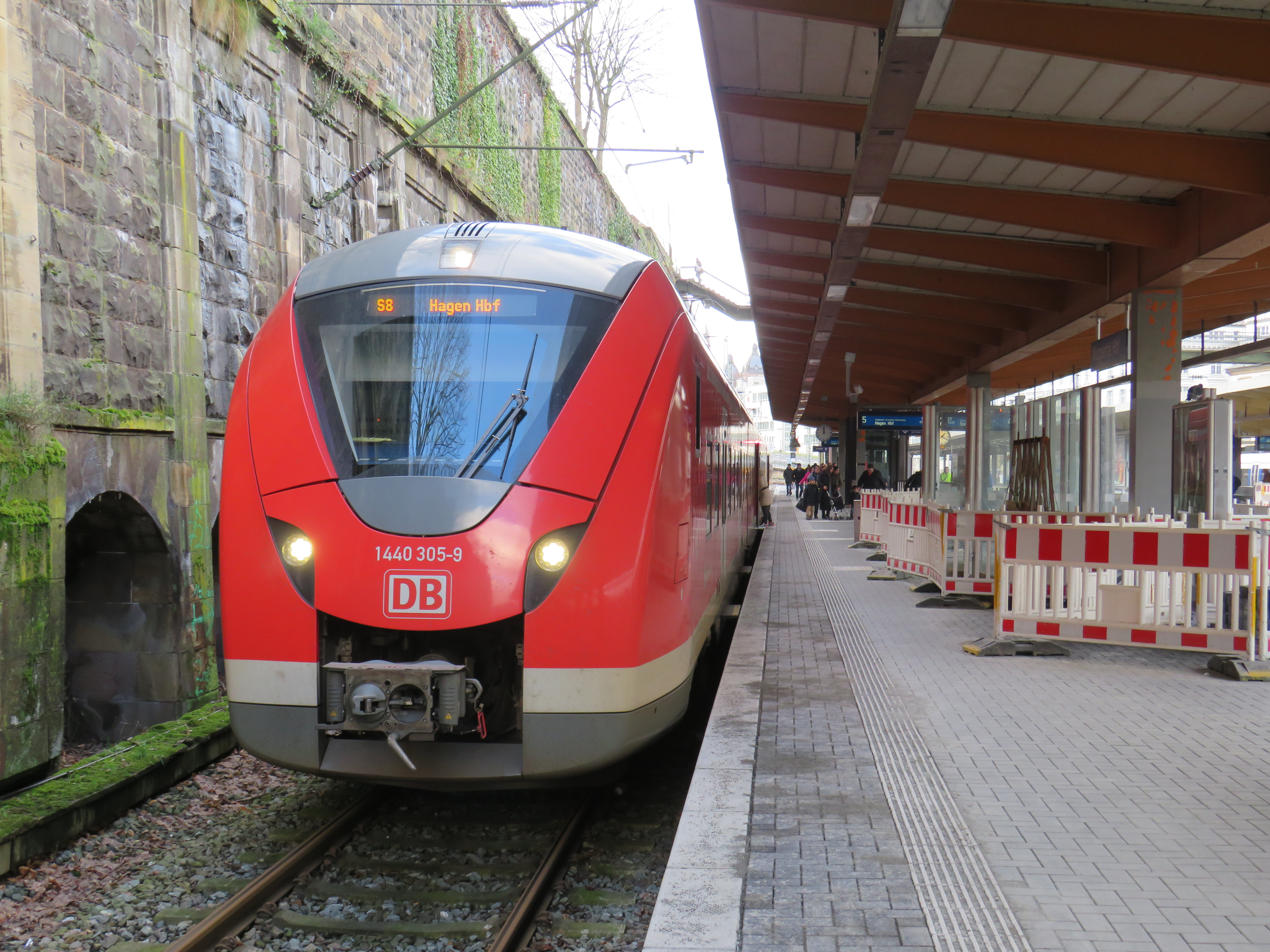
Class 1440 (Alstom Coradia Continental) train at Wuppertal Hauptbahnhof

S-Bahn Rhein-Ruhr train pulling out of Düsseldorf Volksgarten station

The Cologne S-Bahn section went into full operation in 2002 in conjunction with the opening of the Cologne-Frankfurt high speed line. It runs with Class 423 EMUs on lines S11, S12 and S13/S19. Due to recent service improvements, there are insufficient numbers of Class 423 EMUs available, so Class 420 electric multiple units can be found on line S12.

Starting in 2008, 84 units of Class 422 were introduced in the Ruhr area section and around Düsseldorf, replacing the x-Wagen loco-hauled trains.

These newer classes of EMUs once again increased the maximum speed on the network to 140 km/h (87 mph) where permitted, which together with the better acceleration of the EMUs did reduce delays that had become entrenched in the latter years of x-Wagen operations.

The S28 is not operated by DB Regio NRW, but by Regiobahn, which uses Integral S5D95 DMUs. The S7 uses Alstom Coradia LINT DMUs and is operated by RheinRuhrBahn.

New electric rolling stock for the S5 and S8 lines was introduced in December 2014 after having been tested on S68 since October 2014. These Alstom Coradia trains are operated by DB Regio NRW and offer on-board toilet facilities.

All trains of Rhine-Ruhr S-Bahn ran with the red DB livery except for the S7 and S28 trainsets which are painted in the colours of their respective operators.

=== Rolling stock after 2019 ===
Starting in December 2019, there will be major changes in the Ruhr area section of the network: The standard service pattern will be altered from a 20-minute to a 30-minute or 15-minute headway. Services around Düsseldorf and Cologne will not be affected and remain on their 20-minute schedule.

Several services will no longer be operated by DB Regio NRW, but by Abellio Rail NRW. Simultaneously, the livery of all trains will change to green and white to uphold a uniform appearance regardless of operator.

Lines S2, S3 and S9 as well as several Regionalbahn lines that will complement or supplant S-Bahn services will use Stadler FLIRT 3 XL units. Upon eventual electrification, those are also going to run on line S28, sporting Regiobahn's red and white livery.

=== Rolling Stock 2025 ===
S-Bahn Rhein Ruhr

2014: 28x ET(1)440 class

lines: S5, S8

DB / Deutsche Bahn livery,

2018: 48x ET422 class

lines: S1, S4

DB / S-Bahn Rhein-Ruhr livery,

2019: 21x ET(3)427/(3)429 class

lines: S2, S3, S9

DB / S-Bahn Rhein-Ruhr livery.

DIESEL

1998: 10x VT609 class

line: S28

Regiobahn / Regiobahn livery,

2013: 9x VT(1)648 class

line: S7

Rhein-Ruhr-Bahn / Abellio livery.

S-Bahn Rheinland

2000: 63x ET423 class

lines: S11, S12, S19, S68

DB / Deutsche Bahn livery,

2007: 36x ET422 class

lines: S6, S11, S68

DB / Deutsche Bahn livery,

2024: 24x ET424 class

lines: S12, S19

DB / S-Bahn Rheinland livery.

DIESEL

2014: 11x VT620/622 class

line: S23

DB / Deutsche Bahn livery.

In total there are 250 trains in service for two S-Bahn systems in the Rhine-Ruhr area.

After Abellio became insolvent in 2022, other companys got new contracts to keep the lines S2, S3, S7 and S9 in service.

In 2024 class ET424 got new in service to give up the old trains class ET 420. These trains have been originally in service for S-Bahn Hannover since 2000 and got a redesign for the S-Bahn Rheinland.

In 2025 the name S-Bahn Köln has been changed to S-Bahn Rheinland. The classes ET 423 (2000) and ET 422 (2007) also got a new redesign, with new seats and the S-Bahn Rheinland logo on the side. Furthermore the lines S6 and S68 are now part of the S-Bahn Rheinland.

=== Future ===
S-Bahn Rhein-Ruhr

In 2027 line S28 will be operated by 10 trains class ET (3)427. Six trains of these will have the S-Bahn Rhein-Ruhr livery, while the other four trains show the Regiobahn livery.

Vias Rail will operate line S5 and S8 starting 2030 with 33 new trains class ET (3)427 in the S-Bahn Rhein-Ruhr livery.

S-Bahn Rheinland

Furthermore line S23 will be operated by trains class ET 442 (Bombardier Talent 2) starting 2028. These trains are already in service by Deutsche Bahn on other lines and will switch to the S-Bahn Rheinland 2028.

For 2029 there are up to 90 new trains ordered from Alstom for the lines S6, S11, S12, S19, S68 and some new lines. These trains will have 7 or 11 cars and will made it unnecessary to build coupled trains on the lines.

== Lines ==
The region's lines were mainly built by three major private railway companies of the early industrial era: The Cologne-Minden Railway Company, the Bergisch-Märkische Railway Company and the Rhenish Railway Company. After nationalisation and in the post-WW2-era, more lines were built or altered to accommodate S-Bahn services.

A number of tunnel sections were added to extend the S-Bahn to new high-density housing estates (e. g. Cologne-Chorweiler), to suburbs that had historically been villages (e. g. Dortmund-Lütgendortmund station) or the Dortmund university founded in 1968.

=== Lines before December 2019 ===
| Line | Route | Railways used | Length | Opening date of first section | First section |
|---|---|---|---|---|---|
| S1 | Dortmund – Bochum – Essen – Mülheim (Ruhr) – Duisburg – Düsseldorf Airport – Düsseldorf – Hilden – Solingen | Dortmund–Duisburg, Duisburg–Düsseldorf, Düsseldorf–Solingen | 97 km | 26.05.1974 | Bochum – DU-Großenbaum |
| S2 | Dortmund – Dortmund-Dorstfeld – Dortmund-Mengede – Herne – (Gelsenkirchen – (Oberhausen – Duisburg) or Essen) or Recklinghausen | Dortmund–Dortmund-Dorstfeld, Dortmund-Dorstfeld–Dortmund-Mengede, Dortmund-Mengede–Herne/Gelsenkirchen/Duisburg, and part of Gelsenkirchen–Essen or Herne–Recklinghausen | 58 / 42 / 33 km | 02.06.1991 | Dortmund – Duisburg |
| S3 | Oberhausen – Mülheim (Ruhr) – Essen – Essen-Steele – Hattingen (Ruhr) Mitte | Oberhausen–Essen-Steele Ost, Essen-Steele Ost–Bochum-Dahlhausen, Bochum-Dahlhausen–Hattingen (Ruhr) Mitte | 33 km | 26.05.1974 | Oberhausen – Hattingen (Ruhr) |
| S4 | Dortmund-Lütgendortmund – Dortmund–Dorstfeld – Unna-Königsborn – Unna | Dortmund-Lütgendortmund–Dortmund Süd, Dortmund Süd–Unna-Königsborn, Unna-Königsborn–Unna | 30 km | 03.06.1984 | DO-Germania – Unna |
| S5 | Dortmund – Witten – Wetter (Ruhr) – Hagen (– Mönchengladbach Hbf; as S8, see below) | Dortmund–Hagen | 31 km | 29.05.1994 | Whole length |
| S6 | Essen – Ratingen Ost – Düsseldorf – Langenfeld (Rheinl) – Cologne – Cologne-Nippes | Essen–Essen-Werden, Essen-Werden–Düsseldorf, Düsseldorf–Cologne, Cologne–Köln-Nippes | 78 km | 28.09.1967 | Ratingen Ost – D-Garath |
| S7 | Wuppertal – Remscheid – Solingen | Wuppertal–Wuppertal-Oberbarmen, Wuppertal-Oberbarmen–Solingen | 41 km | 15.12.2013 | Whole length |
| S8 | (As S5, see above; Dortmund Hbf –) Hagen – Wuppertal – Wuppertal-Vohwinkel – Düsseldorf – Neuss – Mönchengladbach | Hagen-Schwelm, Schwelm–Wuppertal, Wuppertal–Düsseldorf, Düsseldorf–Mönchengladbach | 82 km | 29.05.1988 | Whole length |
| S9 | Haltern am See – Gladbeck West – Bottrop – Essen – Essen-Steele – Velbert-Langenberg – Wuppertal-Vohwinkel – Wuppertal | Haltern-Gelsenkirchen-Buer Nord, Gladbeck – Bottrop, Essen-Dellwig Ost, Essen-Dellwig Ost–Essen West, Essen West–Essen-Steele, Essen-Steele–Wuppertal-Vohwinkel, Wuppertal-Vohwinkel–Wupperal | 90 km | 24.05.1998 | Haltern – Essen-Steele |
| S28 | Mettmann Stadtwald – Düsseldorf – Neuss – Kaarster See | Mettmann Stadtwald–Düsseldorf, Düsseldorf–Neuss, Neuss–Kaarster See | 34 km | 26.09.1999 | Whole route |
| S68 | Wuppertal-Vohwinkel – Düsseldorf – Langenfeld (Rheinl) | Wuppertal–Düsseldorf, Düsseldorf–Langenfeld | 39 km | 13.12.2009 | Whole length |

Kursbuchstrecken 450.x (x is equivalent to the number of the line), as of 13 December 2009.

=== Lines after December 2019 ===
| Line | Route | Railways used | Length | Operating company | Opening date of first section | First section |
|---|---|---|---|---|---|---|
| S1 | Dortmund Hbf – Bochum Hbf – Essen Hbf – Mülheim (Ruhr) Hbf – Duisburg Hbf – Düsseldorf Airport – Düsseldorf Hbf – Hilden – Solingen Hbf | Dortmund–Duisburg, Cologne–Duisburg, Düsseldorf–Solingen | 97 km | DB Regio | 26.05.1974 | Bochum – DU-Großenbaum |
| S2 | Dortmund Hbf – Dortmund-Dorstfeld – Dortmund-Mengede – Herne – (Gelsenkirchen Hbf – Essen Hbf) or – Recklinghausen Hbf | Dortmund–Duisburg, Welber–Sterkrade, Duisburg–Dortmund, part of Gelsenkirchen–Essen or Herne–Hamburg | 58 / 42 / 33 km | DB Regio | 02.06.1991 | Dortmund – Duisburg |
| S3 | Oberhausen – Mülheim (Ruhr) Hbf– Essen Hbf – Essen-Steele – Hattingen (Ruhr) Mitte | Dortmund–Duisburg, Essen–Bochum, Ruhr Valley | 33 km | DB Regio | 26.05.1974 | Oberhausen – Hattingen (Ruhr) |
| S4 | Dortmund-Lütgendortmund – Dortmund–Dorstfeld – Unna-Königsborn – Unna | Osterath–Dortmund Süd, Welver–Sterkrade, Fröndenberg–Kamen | 30 km | DB Regio | 03.06.1984 | DO-Germania – Unna |
| S5 | Dortmund Hbf – Witten Hbf – Wetter (Ruhr) – Hagen Hbf (– Mönchengladbach Hbf; as S8, see below) | Dortmund–Hagen | 31 km | DB Regio | 29.05.1994 | Whole length |
| S6 | Essen Hbf – Ratingen Ost – Düsseldorf Hbf – Langenfeld (Rheinl) – Köln Hbf – Köln-Nippes | Essen–Essen-Werden, Ruhr Valley, Cologne–Duisburg, Lower Left Rhine | 78 km | DB Regio | 28.09.1967 | Ratingen Ost – D-Garath |
| S7 | Wuppertal Hbf – Remscheid Hbf – Solingen Hbf | Elberfeld–Dortmund, Wuppertal–Solingen | 41 km | RheinRuhrBahn | 15.12.2013 | Whole length |
| S8 | (As S5, see above; Dortmund Hbf –) Hagen Hbf – Wuppertal Hbf – Wuppertal-Vohwinkel – Düsseldorf – Neuss Hbf – Mönchengladbach Hbf | Hagen–Schwelm, Elberfeld–Dortmund, Elberfeld–Düsseldorf, Düsseldorf–Mönchengladbach | 82 km | DB Regio | 29.05.1988 | Whole length |
| S9 | Recklinghausen Hbf / Haltern am See – Gladbeck West – Bottrop Hbf – Essen Hbf – Essen-Steele – Velbert-Langenberg – Wuppertal-Vohwinkel – Wuppertal Hbf – Hagen Hbf | Herne–Hamburg, Hamm–Osterfeld, Mülheim–Oberhausen, Dortmund–Duisburg, Wuppertal–Essen, Düsseldorf–Elberfeld | 90 km | DB Regio | 24.05.1998 | Haltern – Essen-Steele |
| S28 | Wuppertal Hauptbahnhof – Mettmann Stadtwald – Düsseldorf Hbf – Neuss Hbf – Kaarster See | Düsseldorf–Dortmund, Düsseldorf–Neuss, Neuss–Viersen | 34 km | Regiobahn | 26.09.1999 | Whole route |
| S68 | Wuppertal-Vohwinkel – Düsseldorf Hbf – Langenfeld (Rheinl); This service has been halted due to staff shortages until further notice. | Wuppertal–Düsseldorf, Cologne–Duisburg | 39 km | DB Regio | 13.12.2009 | Whole length |

== See also ==
- List of rapid transit systems
