= S28 (Rhine-Ruhr S-Bahn) =

Line in the Rhine-Ruhr S-Bahn network

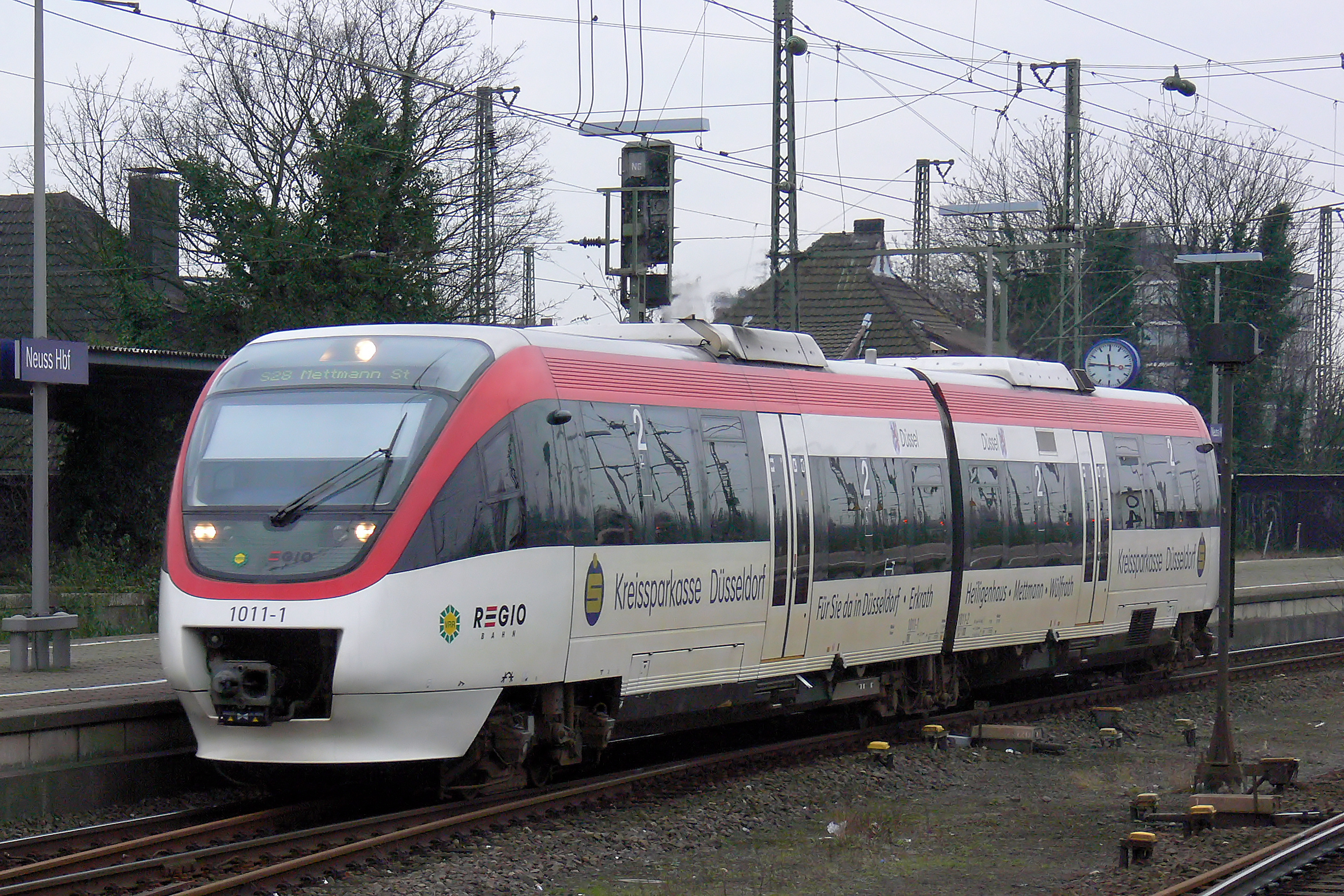

Overview
- Line number: S28
- Termini: Kaarster See; Mettmann Stadtwald (- Wuppertal Hauptbahnhof)
- Stations: 23
- Website: https://www.regio-bahn.de/

Service
- System: Rhein-Ruhr S-Bahn
- Operator(s): Transdev Rheinland GmbH on behalf of Regiobahn Fahrbetriebsgesellschaft mbH
- Rolling stock: 12 Bombardier Talent (1999–2021); 17 Integral (2020–); Stadler FLIRT (?–)

History
- Commenced: 26 September 1999

Technical
- Character: suburban rail
- Track gauge: 1,435 mm (4 ft 8 1/2 in) standard gauge

The S28 Regiobahn is a S-Bahn line in the Rhine-Ruhr S-Bahn network. It is operated by Transdev Rheinland GmbH as a subcontractor of Regiobahn Fahrbetriebsgesellschaft mbH (Regiobahn for short), who is the PSO operator on behalf of Verkehrsverbund Rhein-Ruhr (VRR).

== Description ==
The line begins in Wuppertal Hauptbahnhof, then uses the branch line via Mettmann Stadtwald; then it runs through Düsseldorf Hauptbahnhof branching off to Kaarst after passing through Neuss Hauptbahnhof. Its western terminus is Kaarster See. The line is operated using Integral S5D95 DMUs at 20-minute intervals, with only two trains an hour running between Mettmann and Wuppertal. On weekends, the whole line is operated at 30-minute intervals.

Until 2021, Bombardier Talent DMUs were used, which were replaced by second-hand Integral trains from the Bavarian Oberland Railway.

Electrification of the non-electrified sections is underway, but delayed. The planned electric Stadler FLIRT trains have already been built, and are currently used by Abellio Rail NRW on other lines of the Rhine-Ruhr S-Bahn.

A western extension from Kaarster See via Willich-Schiefbahn to Viersen is planned.

== History ==
Services commenced between Mettmann and Kaarst on 26 September 1999 at 60 minute frequencies, increased to 20 minutes from 28 May 2000. On 13 December 2020, the line was extended from Mettmann Stadtwald via Wuppertal-Vohwinkel to Wuppertal Hbf.

=== Passenger numbers ===
Year	Passengers a day
1998	512^{1}
1999	4,800^{2}
2000	12,000
2001	15,500
2002	17,000
2003	18,000
2004	18,500
2005	18,600
2006	19,300
2007	18,600^{3}
2008	19,900
2009	19,500
2010	21,600
2011	23,350
2012	23,000
2013	23,100
2014	23,000
2015	23,000
2016	23,000
2017	23,000

Source: Regiobahn

^{1}: only Düsseldorf–Mettmann, when operated by DB

^{2}: at 60 minute frequency

^{3}: impacted by strike

== Route ==
The S28 services stop at all stations along the way, except Wuppertal-Sonnborn station.

The following individual railway lines are used:

- from Wuppertal Hbf to Wuppertal-Vohwinkel and from Düsseldorf-Gerresheim to Düsseldorf Hbf (currently managed by DB Netz)
  - the Düsseldorf–Elberfeld railway built from 1838 to 1841 by the Düsseldorf-Elberfeld Railway Company
  - also used by RE4, RE7, RE13, RE49, S8, S9, S68
- from Wuppertal-Vohwinkel to Wuppertal-Dornap Junction (currently managed by DB Netz)
  - the Wuppertal-Vohwinkel–Essen-Überruhr railway built in 1847 by the Prince William Railway Company
  - also used by RE49, S9
- from Wuppertal-Dornap Junction to Hahnenfurth Junction (managed by Regiobahn GmbH)
  - the Wuppertal-Dornap Junction to Hahnenfurth Junction railway, built from 2014 to 2020 by the Regiobahn GmbH
- from Hahnenfurth Junction to Düsseldorf-Gerresheim (currently managed by Regiobahn GmbH)
  - the Düsseldorf-Derendorf–Dortmund Süd railway opened by the Rhenish Railway Company between 1875 and 1879
- from Düsseldorf Hbf to Neuss Hbf (currently managed by DB Netz)
  - the Mönchengladbach–Düsseldorf railway opened by the Bergisch-Markisch Railway Company in 1870
  - also used by RE4, RE6, RE10, RE13, RB39, S8, S11
- from Neuss Hbf to Kaarster See (currently managed by Regiobahn GmbH)
  - the Neuss–Viersen railway opened by the Rhenish Railway Company in 1877–78
