= Kaarster See station =

Railway station in Germany

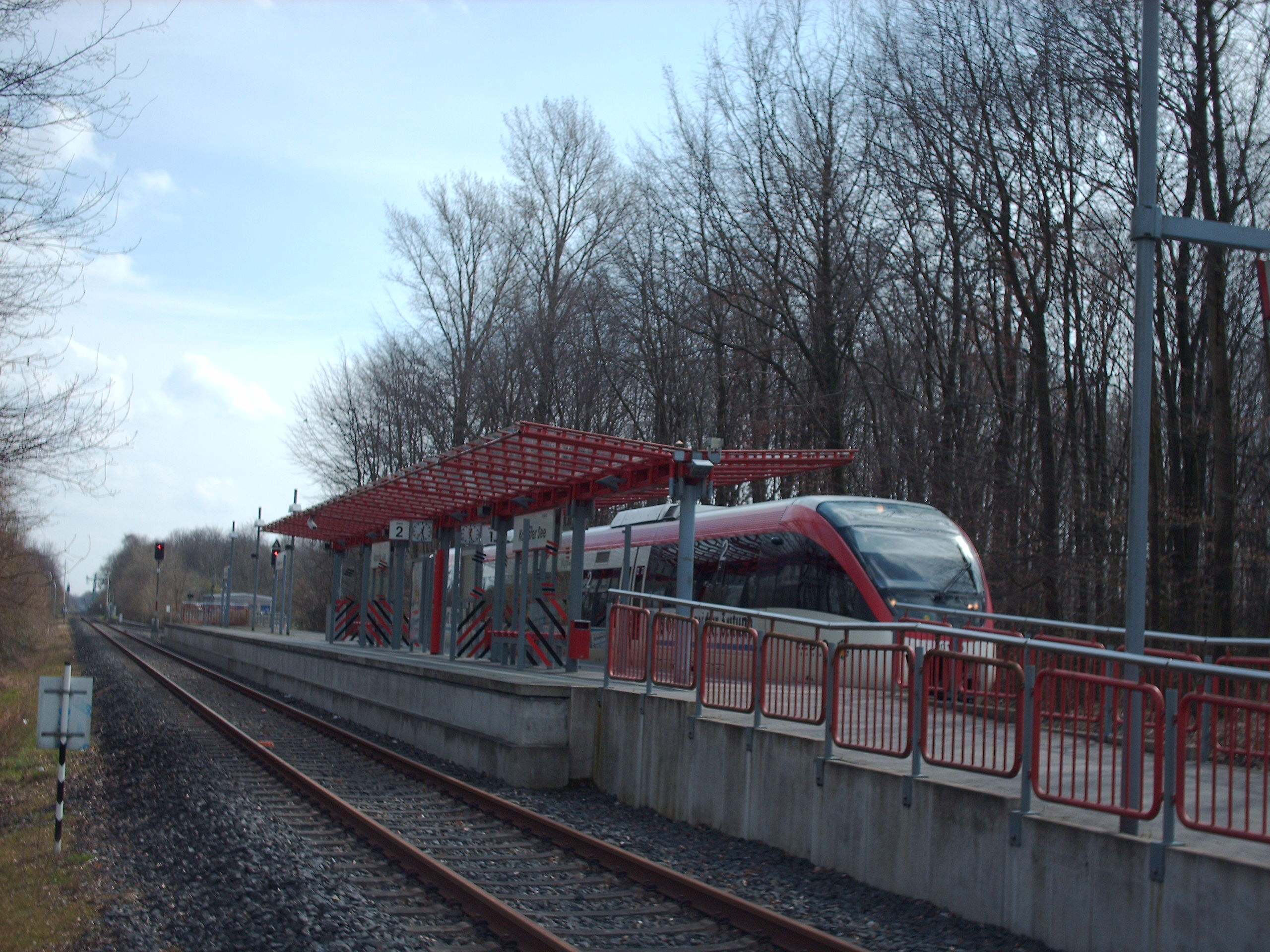

General information
- Location: Kaarst, North Rhine-Westphalia; Germany
- Coordinates: 51°13′35″N 6°35′36″E
- System: Terminal station
- Lines: Neuss–Viersen (KBS 450.28) S28
- Platforms: 2

Construction
- Accessible: Yes

Other information
- Station code: n/a
- DS100 code: KKSE
- IBNR: 8000430
- Category: N/A
- Fare zone: VRR: 528; VRS: 1520 (VRR transitional tariff)
- Website: www.regiobahn.de

History
- Opened: 26 September 1999

Services
Preceding station	Rhine-Ruhr S-Bahn	Following station
Terminus	S28	Kaarster Bahnhof towards Wuppertal Hbf
Location
- Location within North Rhine-Westphalia Location within Germany Location within Europe

Kaarster See station is a train station in the town of Kaarst in the German state of North Rhine-Westphalia on the remaining part of the Neuss–Viersen railway, opened by the Rhenish Railway Company on 15 November 1877. The station opened on 26 September 1999.

The station is served by line S 28 of the Rhine-Ruhr S-Bahn, running between Mettmann Stadtwald or Wuppertal Hbf and Kaarster See, operating every 20 minutes during the day.

It is also served by three bus routes operated by Busverkehr Rheinland: SB86 (at 30 or 60 minute intervals), 862 (60) and 094 (60).
