= Hochdahl-Millrath station =

Railway station in Erkrath, Germany

Hochdahl Millrath
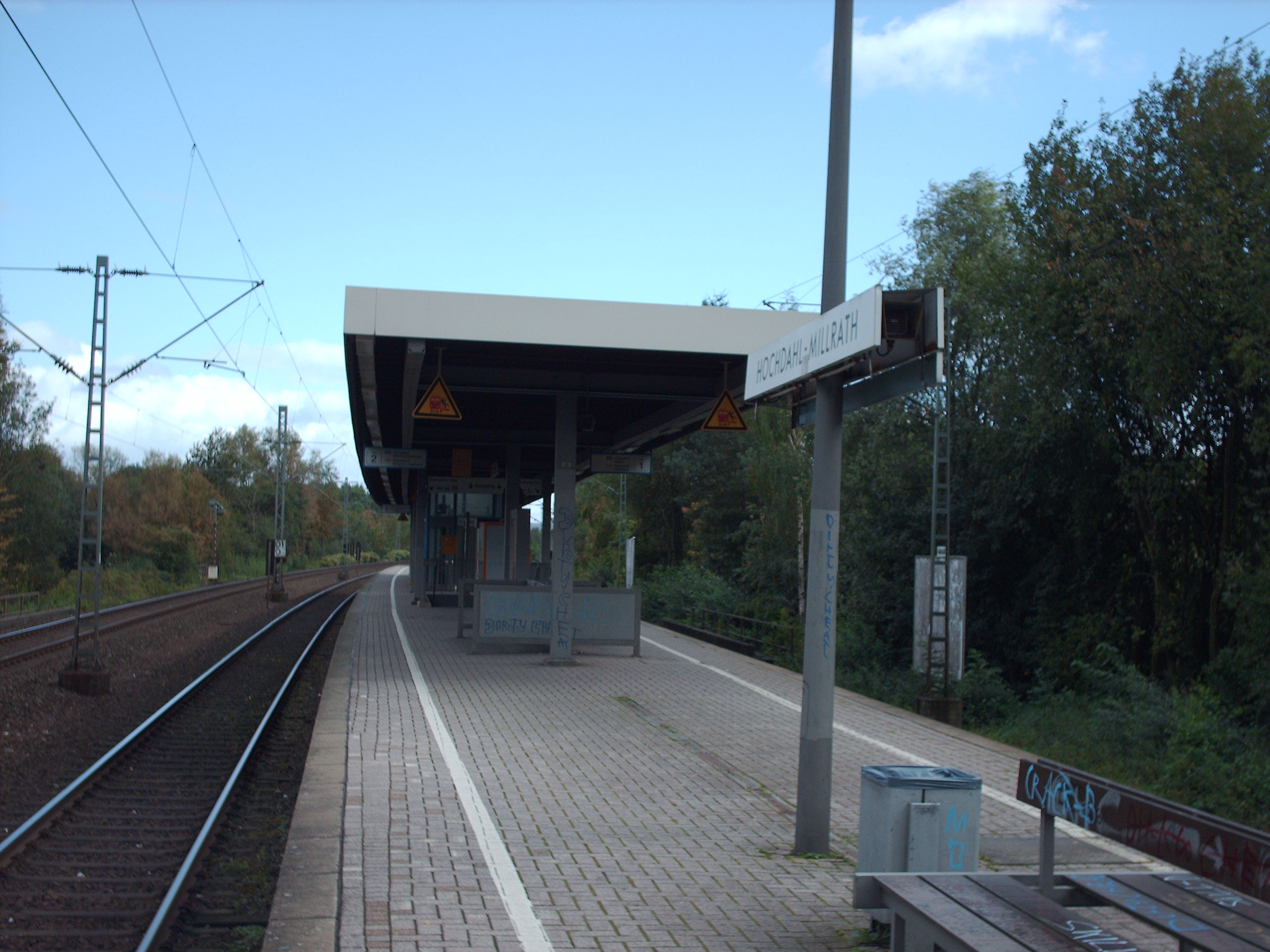

General information
- Location: Gruitener Str. 1, Erkrath-Hochdahl, NRW; Germany
- Coordinates: 51°12′58″N 6°58′01″E
- Lines: Düsseldorf–Elberfeld (KBS 450.8
- Platforms: 2

Construction
- Accessible: Yes

Other information
- Station code: 2799
- DS100 code: KHOM
- IBNR: 8002869
- Category: 5
- Fare zone: VRR: 640; VRS: 1640 (VRR transitional tariff)
- Website: www.bahnhof.de

History
- Opened: 1968

Services
Preceding station	Rhine-Ruhr S-Bahn	Following station
Hochdahl towards Mönchengladbach Hbf	S8	Gruiten towards Hagen Hbf
Hochdahl towards Langenfeld	S68	Gruiten towards Wuppertal-Vohwinkel
Location

Hochdahl-Millrath station is a through station in the district of Millrath of the town of Erkrath in the German state of North Rhine-Westphalia. The station was opened in 1968 or 1969 on the section of the Düsseldorf–Elberfeld railway from Erkrath to Wuppertal-Vohwinkel that was opened by the Düsseldorf-Elberfeld Railway Company on 10 April 1841. It has two platform tracks and it is classified by Deutsche Bahn as a category 5 station.

The station is served by Rhine-Ruhr S-Bahn lines S 8 between Mönchengladbach and Wuppertal-Oberbarmen or Hagen every 20 minutes and several S 68 services between Wuppertal-Vohwinkel and Langenfeld in the peak hour.

It is also served by two bus routes operated by Rheinbahn: O5 (every 20 minutes) and O6 (20-60).
