= Hochdahl station =

Railway station in Erkrath, Germany

Hochdahl
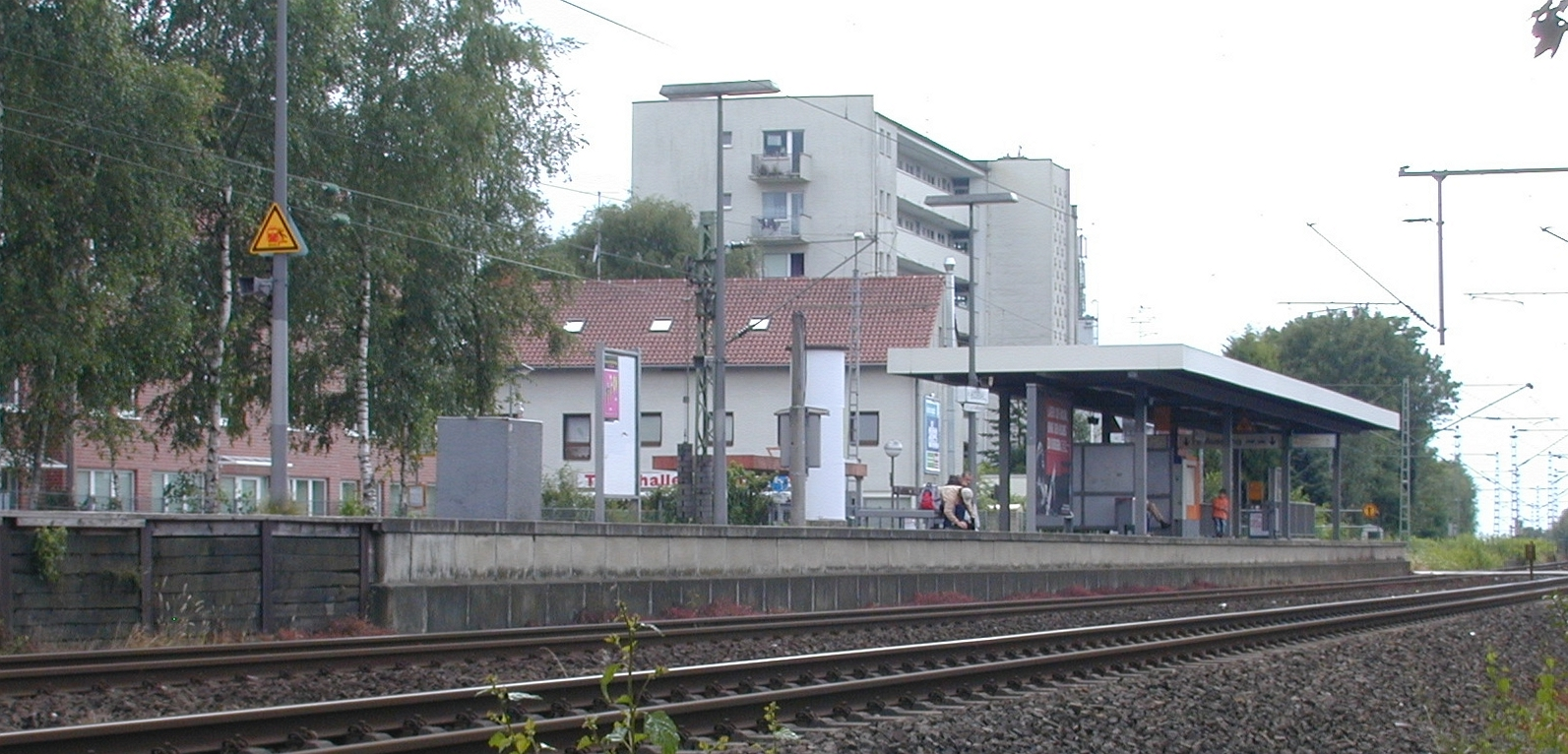

General information
- Location: Ziegeleiweg 3, Erkrath, NRW; Germany
- Coordinates: 51°13′07″N 6°56′40″E
- Lines: Düsseldorf–Elberfeld (KBS 450.8)
- Platforms: 2

Construction
- Accessible: Yes

Other information
- Station code: 2798
- DS100 code: KHO
- IBNR: 8002868
- Category: 5
- Fare zone: VRR: 640; VRS: 1640 (VRR transitional tariff)
- Website: www.bahnhof.de

History
- Opened: 10 April 1841

Services
Preceding station	Rhine-Ruhr S-Bahn	Following station
Erkrath towards Mönchengladbach Hbf	S8	Hochdahl-Millrath towards Hagen Hbf
Erkrath towards Langenfeld	S68	Hochdahl-Millrath towards Wuppertal-Vohwinkel
Location
- Location within North Rhine-Westphalia

Hochdahl station is a through station in the district of Hochdahl of the town of Erkrath in the German state of North Rhine-Westphalia. It has two platform tracks and it is classified by Deutsche Bahn as a category 5 station.

== History ==
The station was opened with the section of the Düsseldorf–Elberfeld railway from Erkrath to Wuppertal-Vohwinkel built by the Düsseldorf-Elberfeld Railway Company on 10 April 1841. The line between Erkrath and Hochdahl has a gradient of 3.33% and rises 82 m in about 2.5 km. For more than one hundred years, this was the steepest main line in Europe. For many years trains had to be hauled by cable, originally driven by a stationary steam engine. A few months later, haulage by cable attached to a stationary steam engine was changed to haulage by cable attached via pulleys; to a locomotive running downhill on an additional track. With the duplication of the remainder of the line in 1865, the steep section of line became three-track, until the electrification of the line in 1963. The third track was rebuilt in 1985, as part of the additional third track built for the planned S-Bahn line. In 1926, cable haulage on the incline was replaced by bank engines.

== Services ==
The station is served by Rhine-Ruhr S-Bahn lines S 8 between Mönchengladbach and Wuppertal-Oberbarmen or Hagen every 20 minutes and several S 68 services between Wuppertal-Vohwinkel and Langenfeld in the peak hour.

It is also served by two bus routes operated by Rheinbahn every 20–60 minutes: O5 and 741.
