= Düsseldorf-Flingern station =

Railway station in Düsseldorf, Germany

Düsseldorf Flingern
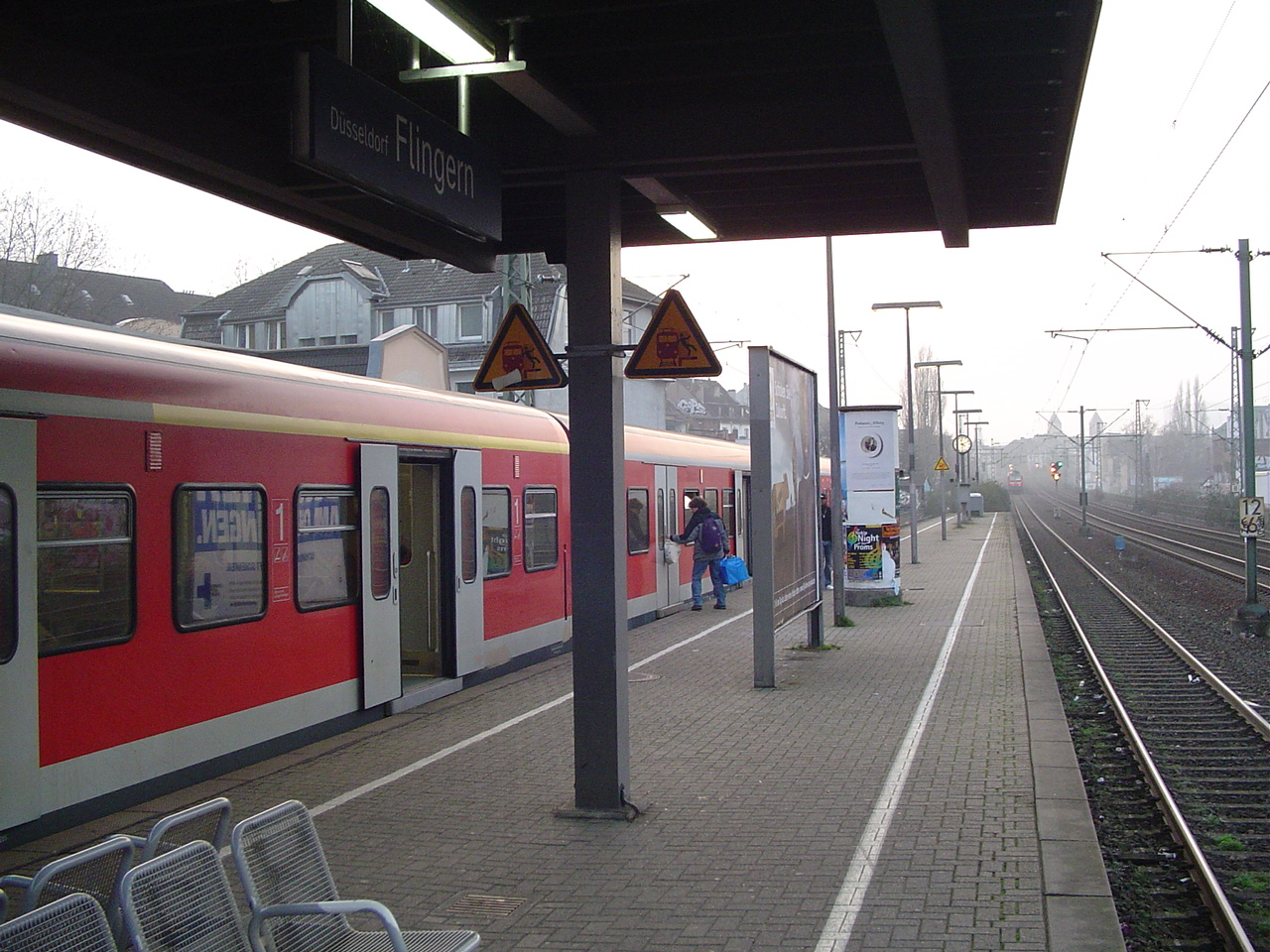

General information
- Location: Dorotheenstr. 81, Flingern, Düsseldorf, NRW; Germany
- Coordinates: 51°13′34″N 6°48′41″E
- Lines: Düsseldorf–Elberfeld (KBS 450.8)
- Platforms: 2

Construction
- Accessible: No

Other information
- Station code: 1410
- DS100 code: KDFL
- IBNR: 8001598
- Category: 5
- Fare zone: VRR: 430; VRS: 1430 (VRR transitional zone)
- Website: www.bahnhof.de

History
- Opened: 29 May 1988

Services
| Preceding station | Rhine-Ruhr S-Bahn | Following station |
|---|---|---|
| Düsseldorf Hbf towards Mönchengladbach Hbf | S8 | Düsseldorf-Gerresheim towards Hagen Hbf |
| Düsseldorf Hbf towards Kaarster See | S28 | Düsseldorf-Gerresheim towards Wuppertal Hbf |
| Düsseldorf Hbf towards Langenfeld | S68 | Düsseldorf-Gerresheim towards Wuppertal-Vohwinkel |
Location
- Location within North Rhine-Westphalia

Düsseldorf-Flingern station is a through station in the district of Flingern in the city of Düsseldorf in the German state of North Rhine-Westphalia. The station was opened on 29 May 1988 on the new line opened by the Prussian state railways on 1 October 1891 between the Hamm Railway Bridge and Gerresheim as part of the construction of Düsseldorf Hauptbahnhof. It has two platform tracks and it is classified by Deutsche Bahn as a category 5 station.

The station is served by Rhine-Ruhr S-Bahn lines S8 between Mönchengladbach and Wuppertal-Oberbarmen or Hagen every 20 minutes, S28 between Mettmann Stadtwald or Wuppertal Hauptbahnhof and Kaarster See every 20 and several S68 services between Wuppertal-Vohwinkel and Langenfeld in the peak hour.

The station is also served by tram lines 706 and 709, operated by Rheinbahn.
