= Erkrath station =

German railway station

Erkrath
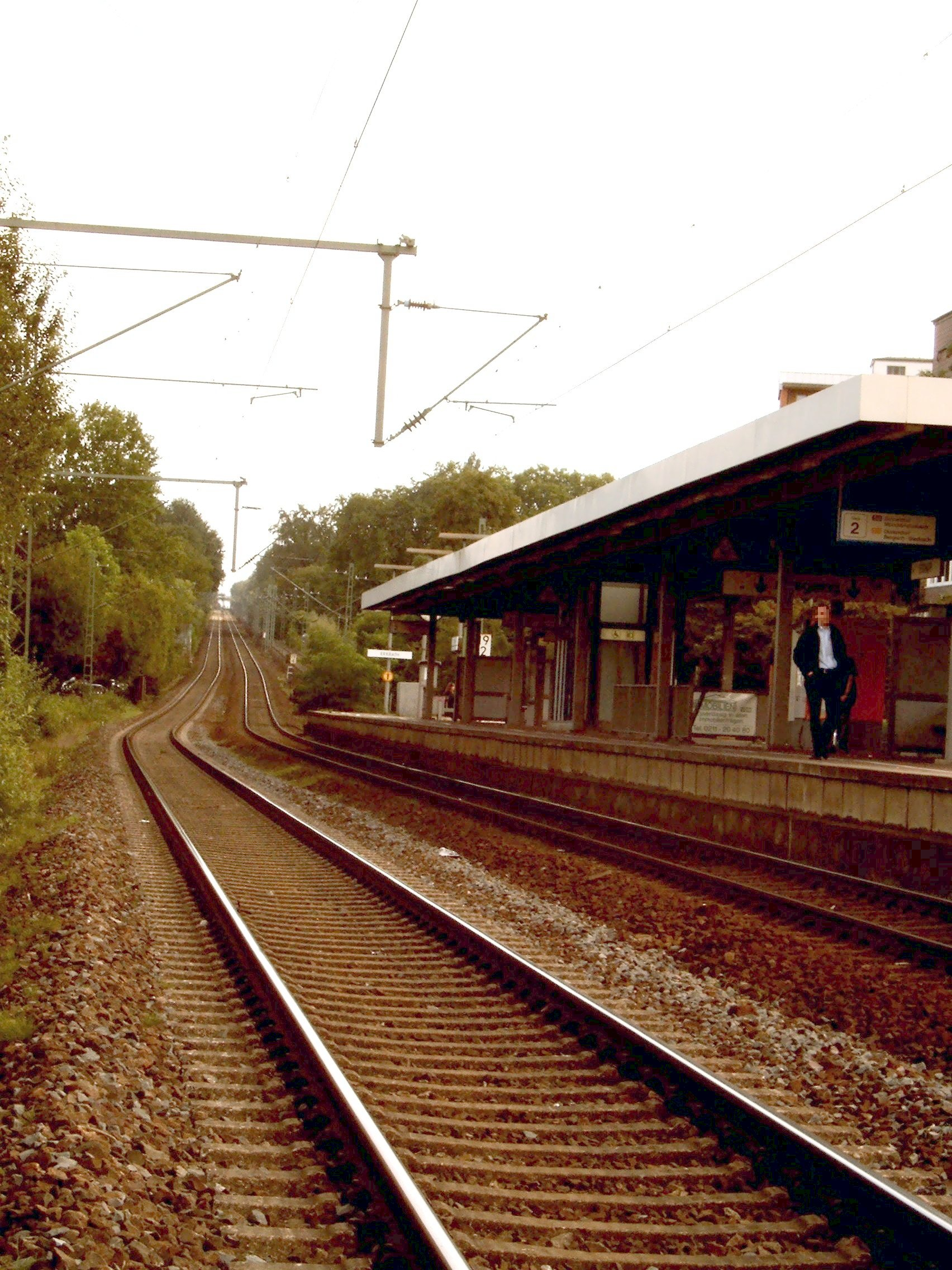
- Beginning of the climb to Hochdahl

General information
- Location: Morper Allee 1, Erkrath, NRW; Germany
- Coordinates: 51°13′13″N 6°54′11″E
- Lines: Düsseldorf–Elberfeld (KBS 450.8)
- Platforms: 2

Construction
- Accessible: yes

Other information
- Station code: 1646
- DS100 code: KER
- IBNR: 8001841
- Category: 5
- Fare zone: VRR: 640; VRS: 1640 (VRR transitional tariff)
- Website: www.bahnhof.de

History
- Opened: 20 December 1838

Services
Preceding station	Rhine-Ruhr S-Bahn	Following station
Düsseldorf-Gerresheim towards Mönchengladbach Hbf	S8	Hochdahl towards Hagen Hbf
Düsseldorf-Gerresheim towards Langenfeld	S68	Hochdahl towards Wuppertal-Vohwinkel
Location
- Location within North Rhine-Westphalia

Erkrath station is a through station in the town of Erkrath in the German state of North Rhine-Westphalia. It has two platform tracks and it is classified by Deutsche Bahn as a category 5 station.

== History ==
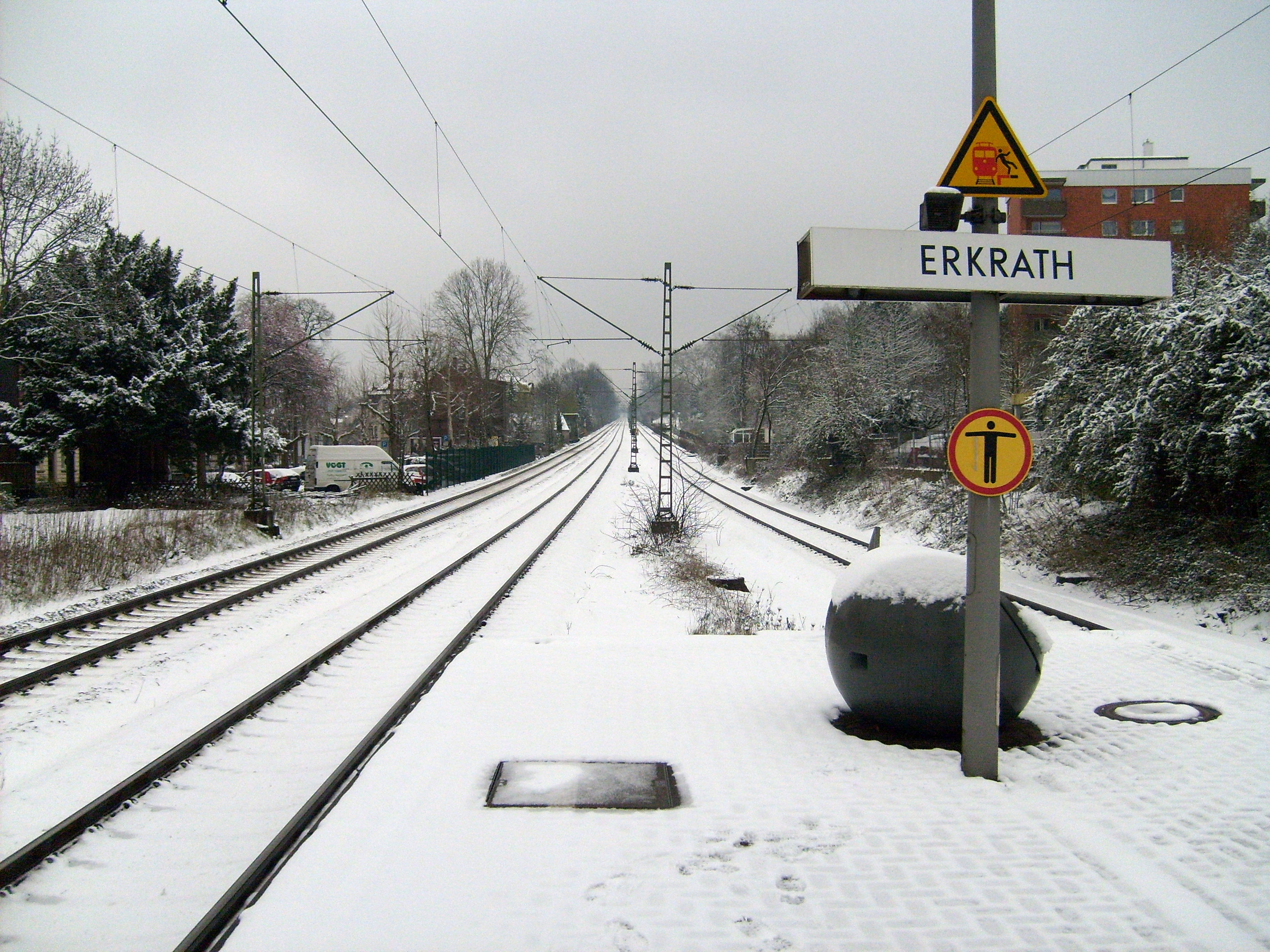

The station was opened along with the Düsseldorf–Elberfeld railway from Düsseldorf to Erkrath by the Düsseldorf-Elberfeld Railway Company on 20 December 1838. The line between Erkrath and Hochdahl has a gradient of 3.33% and rises 82 m in about 2.5 km. For more than one hundred years, this was the steepest main line in Europe. For many years trains had to be hauled by cable, originally driven by a stationary steam engine. A few months later haulage by cable attached to a stationary steam engine was changed to haulage by cable attached via pulleys to a locomotive running downhill on an additional track. With the duplication of the remainder of the line in 1865, the steep section of line became three-track, until the electrification of the line in 1963. The third track was rebuilt in 1985, as part of the additional third track built for the planned S-Bahn line. In 1926, cable haulage on the incline was replaced by bank engines.

== Services ==
The station is served by the Rhine-Ruhr S-Bahn lines S 8 between Mönchengladbach and Wuppertal-Oberbarmen or Hagen every 20 minutes and several S 68 services between Wuppertal-Vohwinkel and Langenfeld in the peak hour.

It is also served by four bus routes operated by Rheinbahn: O5 (every 20–60 minutes), O6 (20), 734 (60) and 743 (60).
