= Düsseldorf-Gerresheim station =

Railway station in Düsseldorf, Germany

Düsseldorf Gerresheim
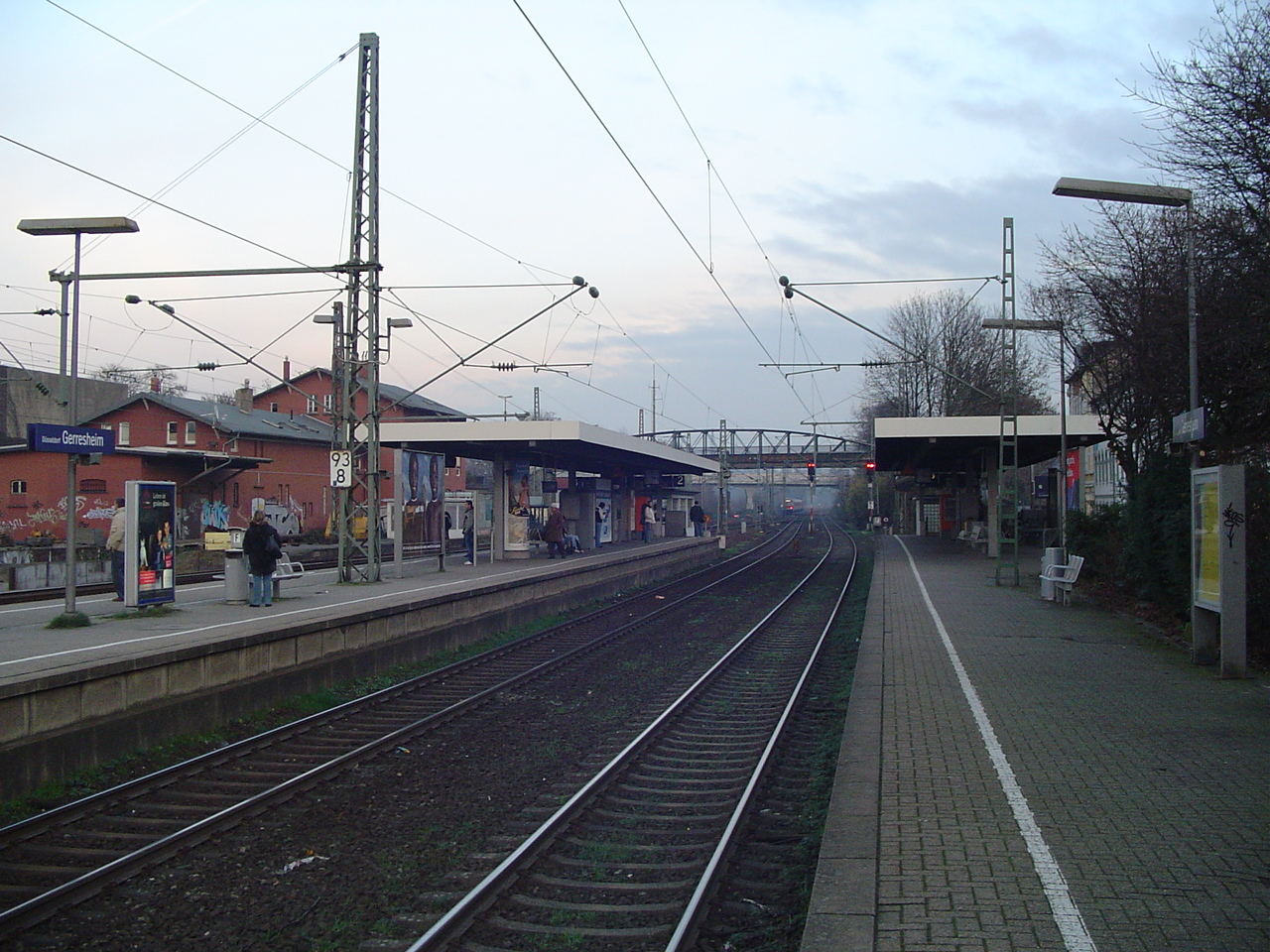

General information
- Location: Heyestr. 194, Düsseldorf, Gerresheim, NRW; Germany
- Coordinates: 51°13′13″N 6°51′51″E
- Lines: Düsseldorf–Elberfeld (KBS 450.8)
- Platforms: 3

Construction
- Accessible: No

Other information
- Station code: 1413
- DS100 code: KDGE
- IBNR: 8001590
- Category: 5
- Fare zone: VRR: 430 and 530; VRS: 1430 and 1530 (VRR transitional zone)
- Website: www.bahnhof.de

History
- Opened: 20 December 1838

Services
Preceding station	Rhine-Ruhr S-Bahn	Following station
Düsseldorf-Flingern towards Mönchengladbach Hbf	S8	Erkrath towards Hagen Hbf
Düsseldorf-Flingern towards Kaarster See	S28	Erkrath Nord towards Wuppertal Hbf
Düsseldorf-Flingern towards Langenfeld	S68	Erkrath towards Wuppertal-Vohwinkel
Preceding station	Rhine-Ruhr Stadtbahn	Following station
Morper Straße towards Universität Ost/Botanischer Garten	U73	Terminus
Location

Düsseldorf-Gerresheim station is a through station in the district of Gerresheim in the city of Düsseldorf in the German state of North Rhine-Westphalia. The station was opened along with the Düsseldorf–Elberfeld railway from Düsseldorf to Erkrath by the Düsseldorf-Elberfeld Railway Company on 20 December 1838. It has two platform tracks and it is classified by Deutsche Bahn as a category 5 station. Its station building, which has been refurbished as Kulturbahnhof (culture station) is the oldest extant station building in Germany.

The station is served by Rhine-Ruhr S-Bahn lines S8 between Mönchengladbach and Wuppertal-Oberbarmen or Hagen every 20 minutes, S28 between Mettmann Stadtwald or Wuppertal Hauptbahnhof and Kaarster See every 20 and several S68 services between Wuppertal-Vohwinkel and Langenfeld in the peak hour.

The station is also served by Stadtbahn line U73 and bus routes 730, 736, 736, and 737, all operated by Rheinbahn.
