= Düsseldorf-Garath station =

Railway station in Düsseldorf, Germany

Düsseldorf Garath
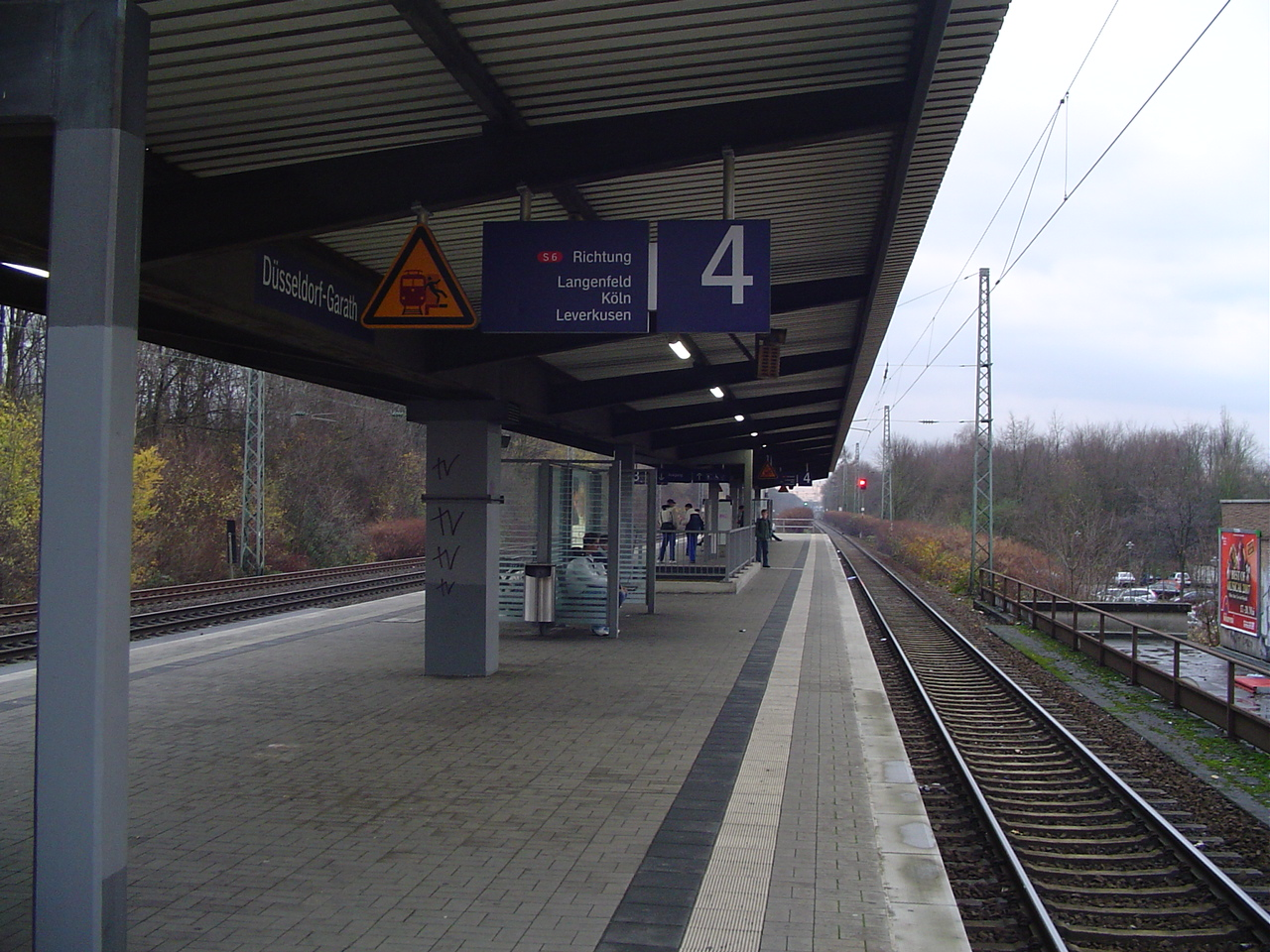

General information
- Location: Fritz-Erler-Str. 1 Düsseldorf, NRW; Germany
- Coordinates: 51°8′36.5″N 6°53′51.9″E
- Lines: Cologne–Duisburg (KBS 450.6)
- Platforms: 2

Construction
- Accessible: Yes

Other information
- Station code: 1412
- DS100 code: KDGA
- IBNR: 8001589
- Category: 5
- Fare zone: VRR: 530; VRS: 1530 (VRR transitional zone)
- Website: www.bahnhof.de

History
- Opened: 1967

Services
| Preceding station | Rhine-Ruhr S-Bahn | Following station |
|---|---|---|
| Düsseldorf-Hellerhof towards Köln-Nippes | S6 | Düsseldorf-Benrath towards Essen Hbf |
| Düsseldorf-Hellerhof towards Langenfeld | S68 | Düsseldorf-Benrath towards Wuppertal-Vohwinkel |
Location

Düsseldorf-Garath is a railway station situated at Garath, Düsseldorf in western Germany. It is served by lines S6 and S68 of the Rhine-Ruhr S-Bahn.
