= Haan-Gruiten station =

Railway station in Germany

Haan Gruiten
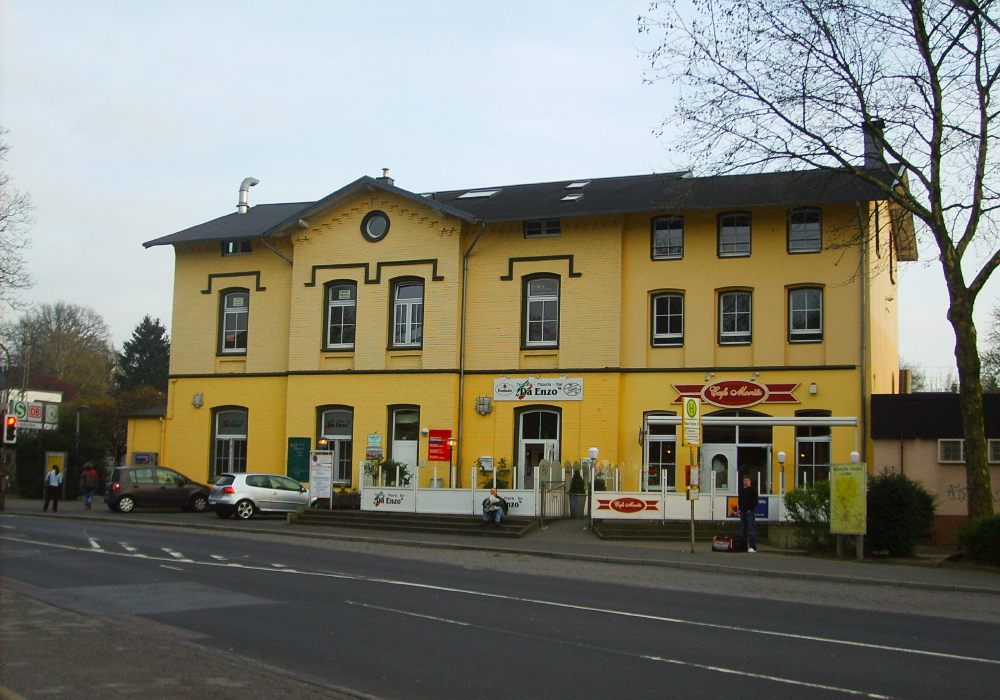
- Entrance building

General information
- Location: Thunbuschstr. 20, Haan, NRW; Germany
- Coordinates: 51°12′52″N 7°0′36″E
- Lines: Düsseldorf–Elberfeld; Gruiten–Köln-Deutz
- Platforms: 2
- Tracks: 4

Construction
- Accessible: No

Other information
- Station code: 2381
- DS100 code: KGUH (S-Bahn, tracks 2/3); KGUI (tracks 4-7)
- IBNR: 8000138
- Category: 4
- Fare zone: VRR: 642; VRS: 1640 (VRR transitional zone)
- Website: www.bahnhof.de

History
- Opened: 1841

Services
Preceding station	National Express Germany	Following station
Haan towards Bonn-Mehlem	RB 48 (Rhein-Wupper-Bahn)	Wuppertal-Vohwinkel towards Wuppertal-Oberbarmen
Preceding station	Rhine-Ruhr S-Bahn	Following station
Hochdahl-Millrath towards Mönchengladbach Hbf	S8	Wuppertal-Vohwinkel towards Hagen Hbf
Hochdahl-Millrath towards Langenfeld	S68	Wuppertal-Vohwinkel Terminus
Location

Haan-Gruiten station (Gruiten until 9 December 2017) is one of the two stations of the Bergian city of Haan in the German state of North Rhine-Westphalia. It is described in German as a Berührungsbahnhof (contact station), as the Düsseldorf–Elberfeld and the Gruiten–Köln-Deutz lines both pass through the station, but their operations are separate. East of the station, they join to form a common route at Linden junction, which is the actual beginning of the Gruiten–Köln-Deutz line. West of the platforms the lines separate to run to the west and the south.

== History ==
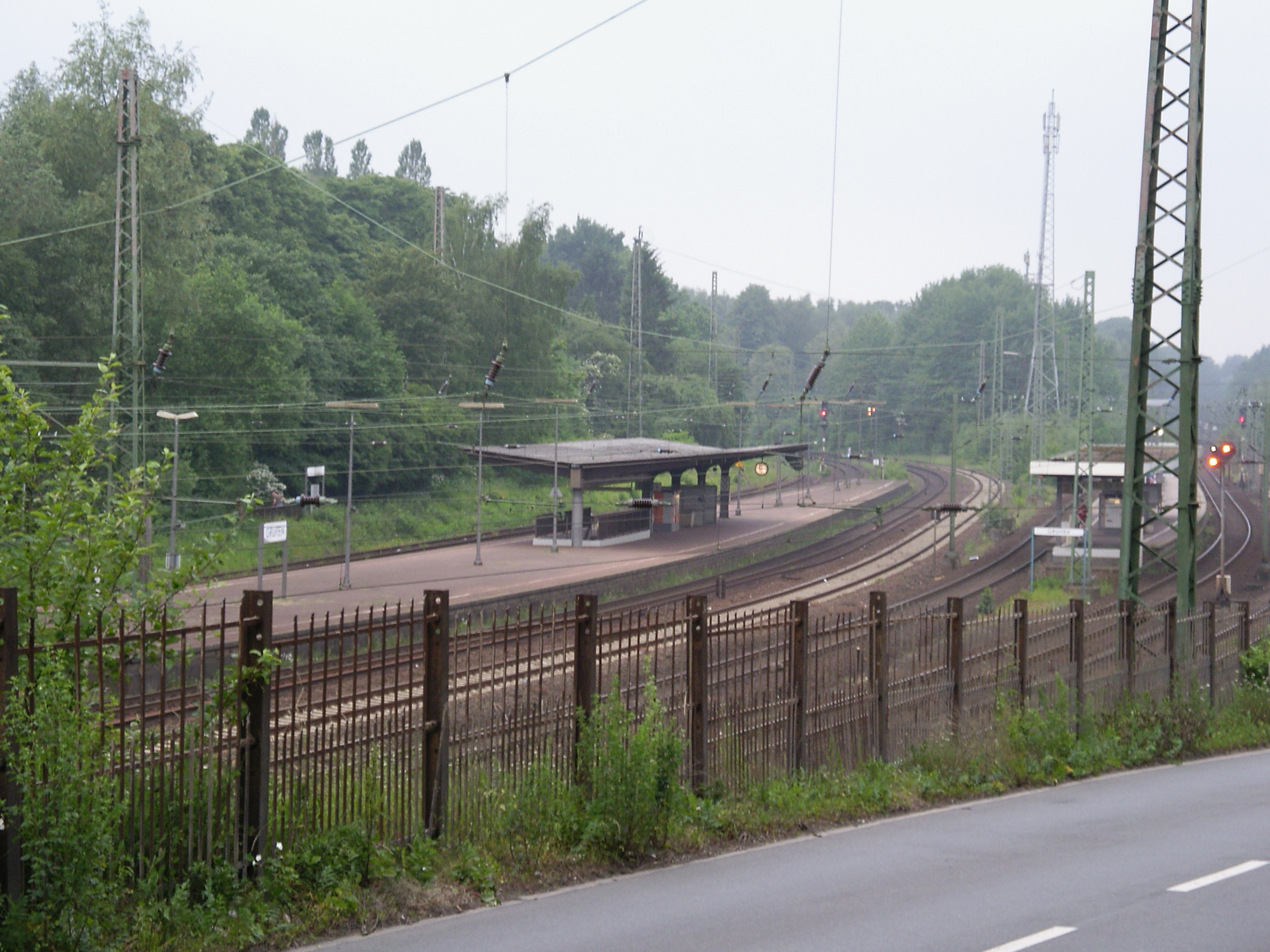
On the left are the tracks to Cologne; on the right are the tracks to Düsseldorf

The railway station on the Düsseldorf-Elberfeld line was opened on 3 September 1841 under the name of Haan (Gruiten) and for many years it was the only Haan station. The line to Cologne was opened in 1867 and the current Haan station was opened in 1907, allowing the station in the then independent town of Gruiten to be renamed Gruiten station. In 1909 the existing station building was built. As part of the establishment of S-Bahn services on the Düsseldorf–Wuppertal line in 1988, Gruiten station was significantly rebuilt. The platform on track 1 and the ramps for loading limestone were demolished. This allowed a large park and ride lot to be built. Tracks 2 and 3 were moved and now serve as the S-Bahn station. Track 4 is used as a platform for overtaking trains on the route to and from Cologne. The normal platform for trains to and from Cologne is served by tracks 5 and 6. Track 7 is used by freight trains.

== Current operations ==
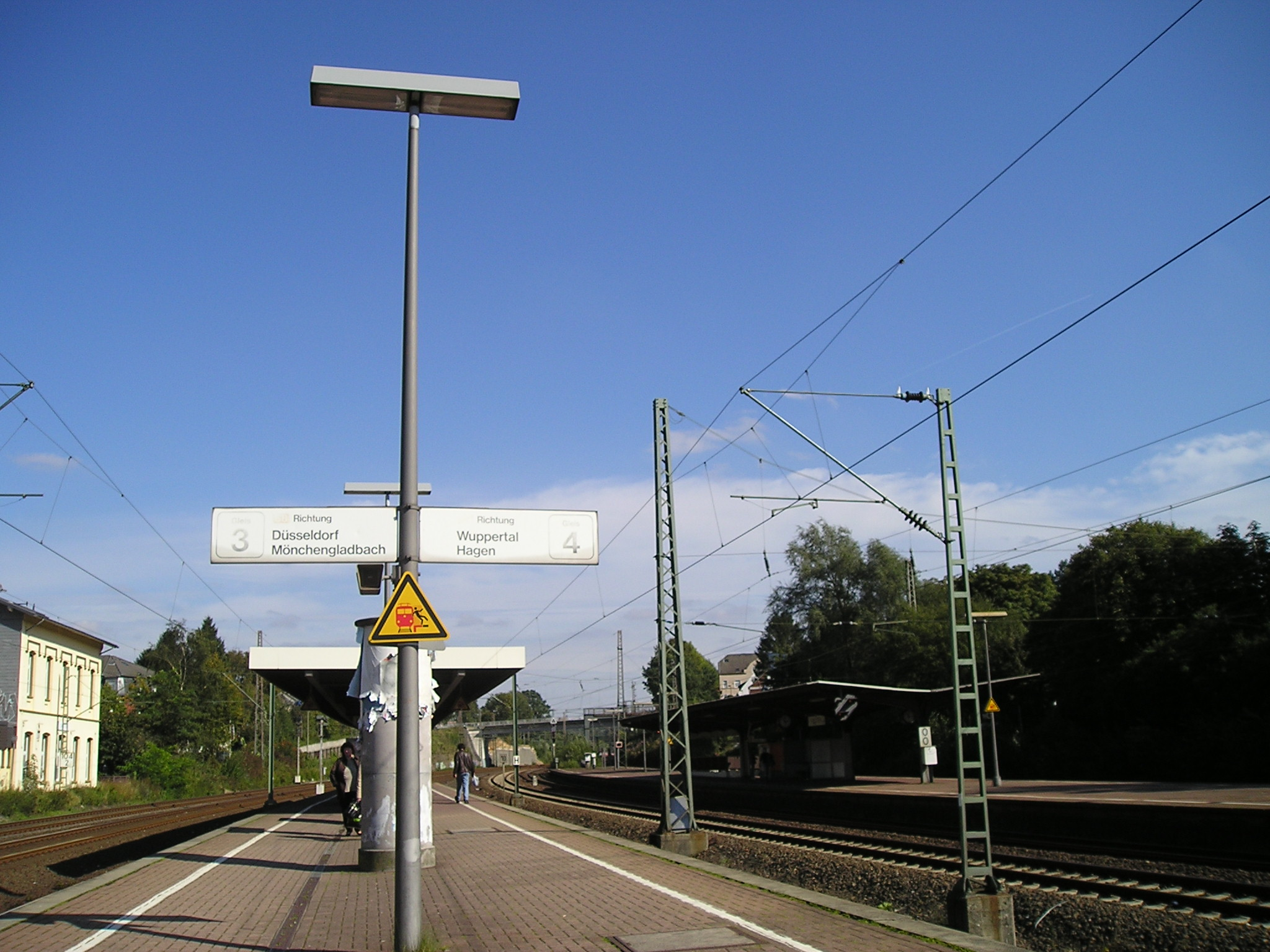
S-Bahn platforms

The station is served by Rhine-Ruhr S-Bahn lines, the S 8 every 20 minutes, several S 68 services in the peak hour and every half hour by the Rhein-Wupper-Bahn (RB 48).

The station building was thoroughly renovated in the 1990s. Today the building contains a restaurant and the Gruiten municipal library. On the forecourt of the station there is a taxi rank and bus stop, served by buses towards Mettmann, Haan and Wülfrath.
