= Düsseldorf-Hellerhof station =

Railway station in Germany

Düsseldorf Hellerhof
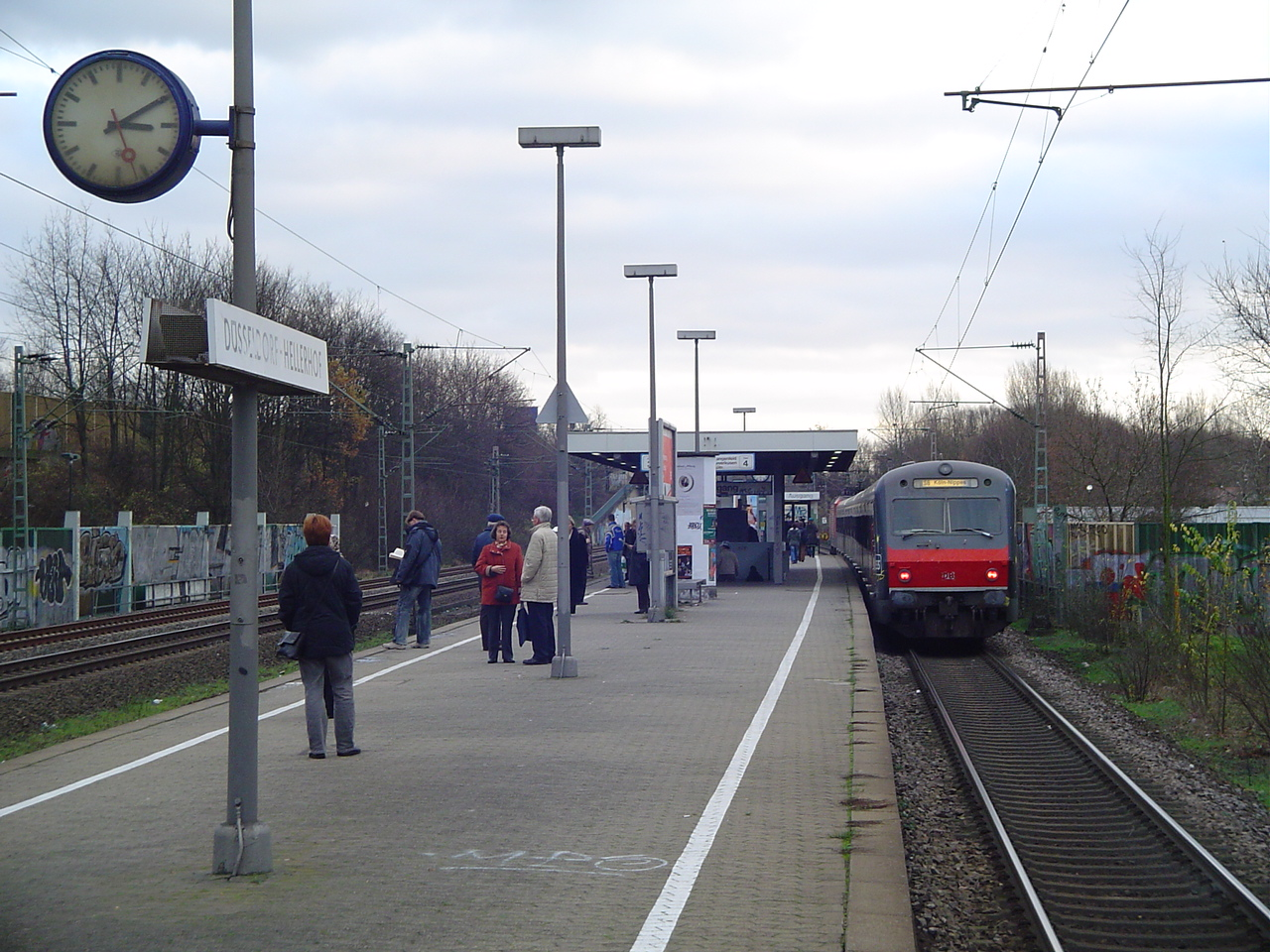

General information
- Location: Hellerhofweg 1 Hellerhof, NRW; Germany
- Coordinates: 51°8′0″N 6°54′30″E
- Line: Cologne–Duisburg railway
- Platforms: 1
- Tracks: 2

Construction
- Accessible: Yes

Other information
- Station code: 1415
- DS100 code: KDHL
- IBNR: 8004920
- Category: 5
- Fare zone: VRR: 530, 730, and 732; VRS: 1530 (VRR transitional zone)
- Website: www.bahnhof.de

History
- Opened: 15 December 1982

Services
Preceding station	Rhine-Ruhr S-Bahn	Following station
Langenfeld-Berghausen towards Köln-Nippes	S6	Düsseldorf-Garath towards Essen Hbf
Langenfeld-Berghausen towards Langenfeld	S68	Düsseldorf-Garath towards Wuppertal-Vohwinkel
Location
- Location within North Rhine-Westphalia

Düsseldorf-Hellerhof is a railway station situated at Hellerhof, Düsseldorf in western Germany. It is classified by Deutsche Bahn as a category 5 station. It is served by line S6 of the Rhine-Ruhr S-Bahn at 20-minute intervals.
