= Wuppertal-Sonnborn station =

Railway station in Wuppertal, Germany

Wuppertal Sonnborn
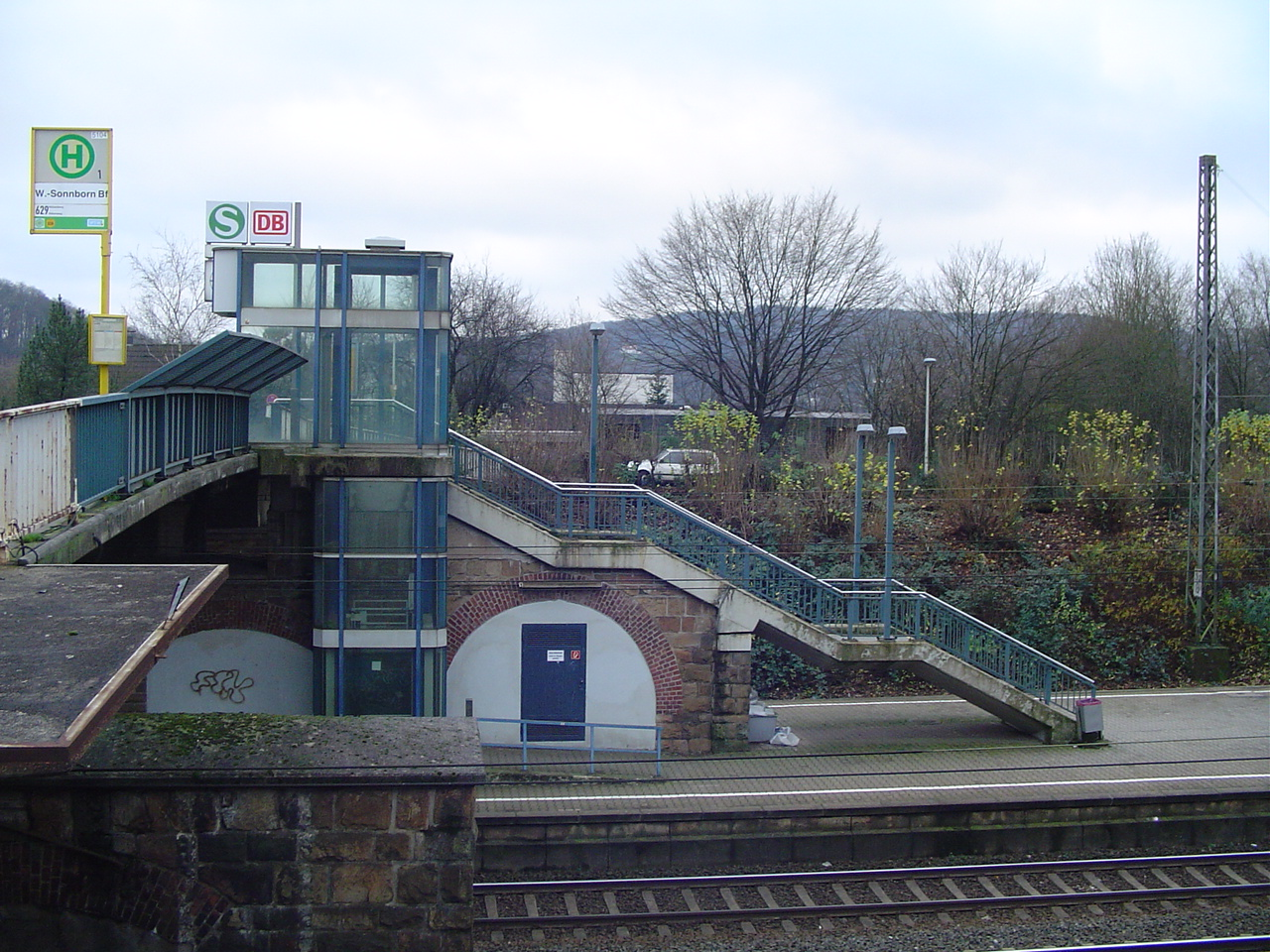

General information
- Location: Wuppertal, NRW; Germany
- Coordinates: 51°14′26″N 7°05′47″E
- Lines: Düsseldorf–Elberfeld (KBS 450.8)
- Platforms: 2

Construction
- Accessible: No

Other information
- Station code: 6934
- DS100 code: KWSO
- IBNR: 8006618
- Category: 4
- Fare zone: VRR: 656; VRS: 1650 (VRR transitional zone)
- Website: www.bahnhof.de

History
- Opened: 1870/80

Services
| Preceding station | Rhine-Ruhr S-Bahn | Following station |
|---|---|---|
| Wuppertal-Vohwinkel towards Mönchengladbach Hbf | S8 | Wuppertal Zoologischer Garten towards Hagen Hbf |
| Wuppertal-Vohwinkel towards Haltern am See or Recklinghausen Hbf | S9 | Wuppertal Zoologischer Garten towards Hagen Hbf |
Location

Wuppertal-Sonnborn station is located in the city of Wuppertal in the German state of North Rhine-Westphalia. It is on the Düsseldorf–Elberfeld line and is classified by Deutsche Bahn as a category 4 station.

The station is served by Rhine-Ruhr S-Bahn lines S8, running between Mönchengladbach Hauptbahnhof and Hagen Hauptbahnhof every 20 minutes (two out of three starting/ending at Wuppertal-Oberbarmen), and S9, running between Gladbeck and Wuppertal Hbf every 30 minutes (half extended to Recklinghausen / Haltern am See and to Hagen). It is also served by bus route 629, operated by WSW mobil at 30 or 60 minute intervals during the day.
