= Langenfeld-Berghausen station =

Railway station in Langenfeld, Germany

Langenfeld (Rhinel) Berghausen
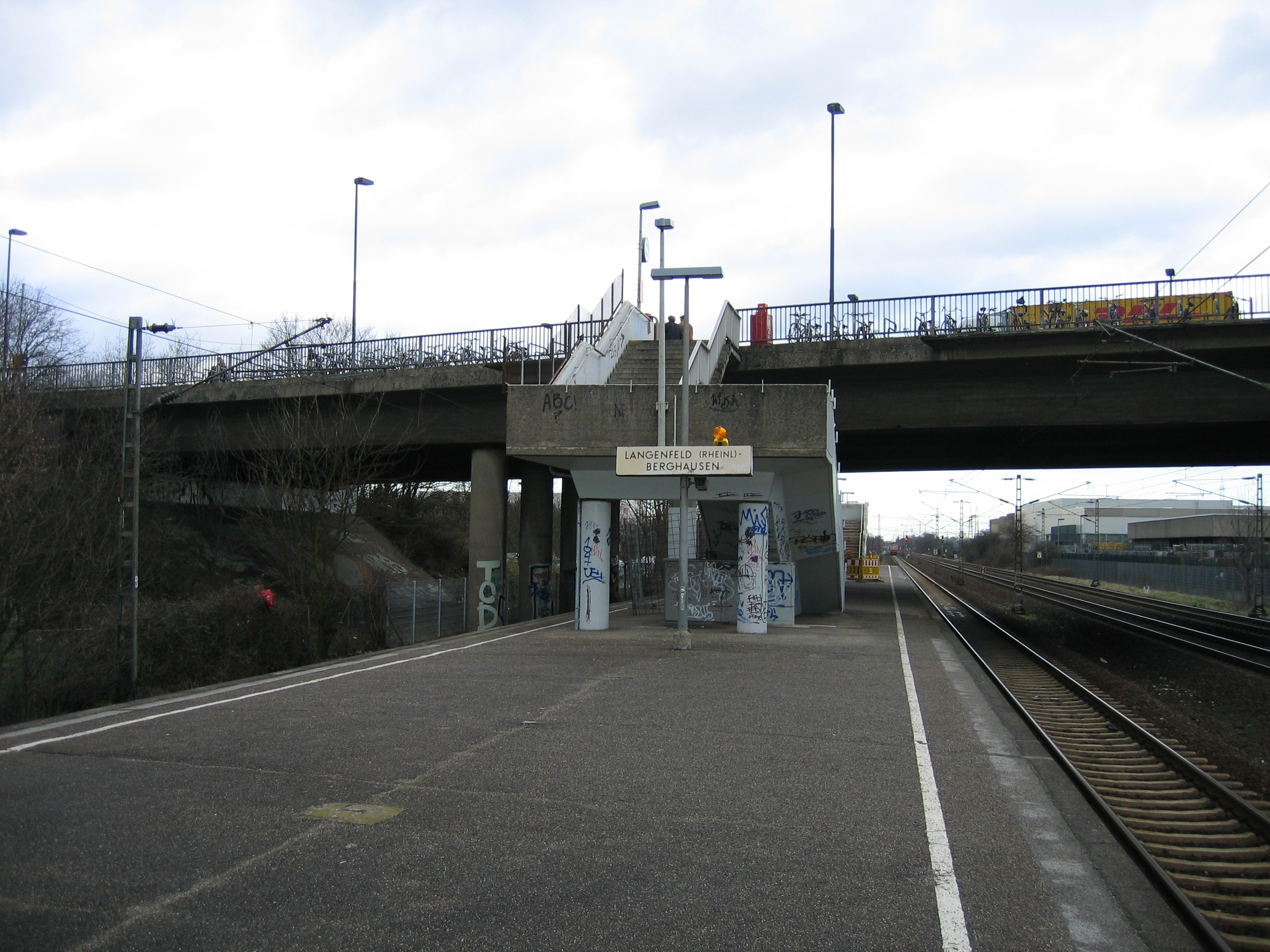

General information
- Location: Berghausener Str. 1, Langenfeld, NRW; Germany
- Coordinates: 51°07′02″N 6°55′27″E
- Lines: Cologne–Duisburg (KBS 450.6)
- Platforms: 2

Construction
- Accessible: No

Other information
- Station code: 3536
- DS100 code: KLA
- IBNR: 8003539
- Category: 5
- Fare zone: VRR: 730; VRS: 1730 (VRR transitional zone)
- Website: www.bahnhof.de

History
- Opened: 1971/72

Services
Preceding station	Rhine-Ruhr S-Bahn	Following station
Langenfeld towards Köln-Nippes	S6	Düsseldorf-Hellerhof towards Essen Hbf
Langenfeld Terminus	S68	Düsseldorf-Hellerhof towards Wuppertal-Vohwinkel
Location

Langenfeld-Berghausen station is located in the city of Langenfeld in the German state of North Rhine-Westphalia. It is on the Cologne–Duisburg line and is classified by Deutsche Bahn as a category 5 station. It is served by Rhine-Ruhr S-Bahn line S6 every 20 minutes, and by a few services of line S68 in the peak hour.

== Services ==
Currently, the station is served by two S-Bahn lines and two bus routes: 777 (operated by Rheinbahn and Bahnen der Stadt Monheim) and 787 (operated by Rheinbahn and Kreisverkehrsgesellschaft Mettmann).
