= Erkrath Nord station =

German railway station

Erkrath Nord
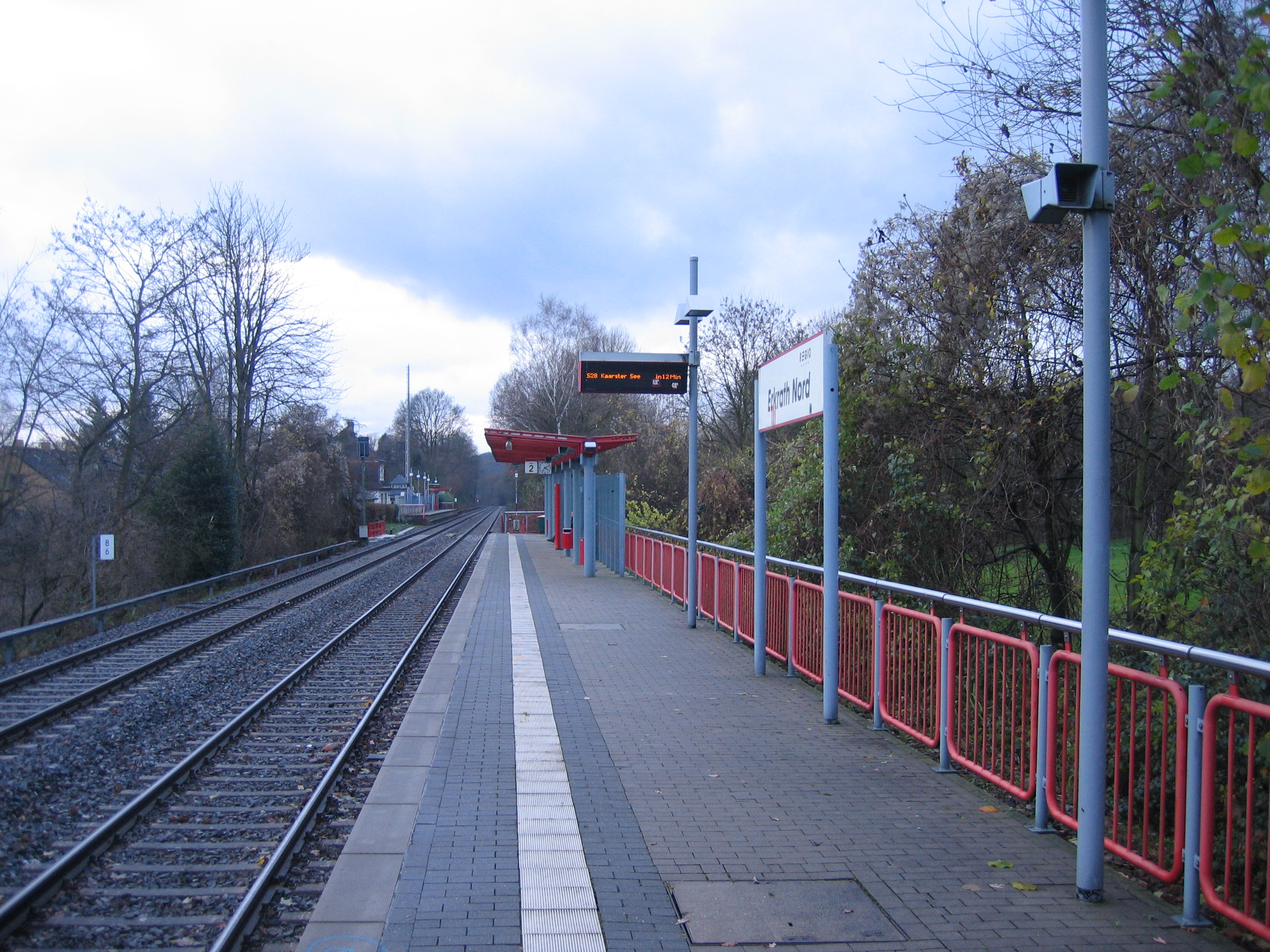

General information
- Location: Erkrath, North Rhine-Westphalia; Germany
- Coordinates: 51°13′45″N 6°54′34″E
- System: Through station
- Line: Düsseldorf–Mettmann S28
- Platforms: 2

Construction
- Accessible: Yes

Other information
- Station code: n/a
- DS100 code: KERN
- Fare zone: VRR: 640; VRS: 1640 (VRR transitional tariff)
- Website: www.regiobahn.de

History
- Opened: 1905/14

Services
Preceding station	Rhine-Ruhr S-Bahn	Following station
Düsseldorf-Gerresheim towards Kaarster See	S28	Neanderthal towards Wuppertal Hbf
Location

Erkrath Nord station is a Rhine-Ruhr S-Bahn station in the town of Erkrath in the German state of North Rhine-Westphalia. It was opened between 1905/14 on the last section of the Düsseldorf-Derendorf–Dortmund Süd railway from Mettmann station (now Mettmann Stadtwald station) to the Rhenish Railway Company's Düsseldorf station, opened on 15 September 1879.

The station is served by Rhine-Ruhr S-Bahn line S 28 at 20-minute intervals
