= Haan station =

Railway station in Haan, Germany

Haan
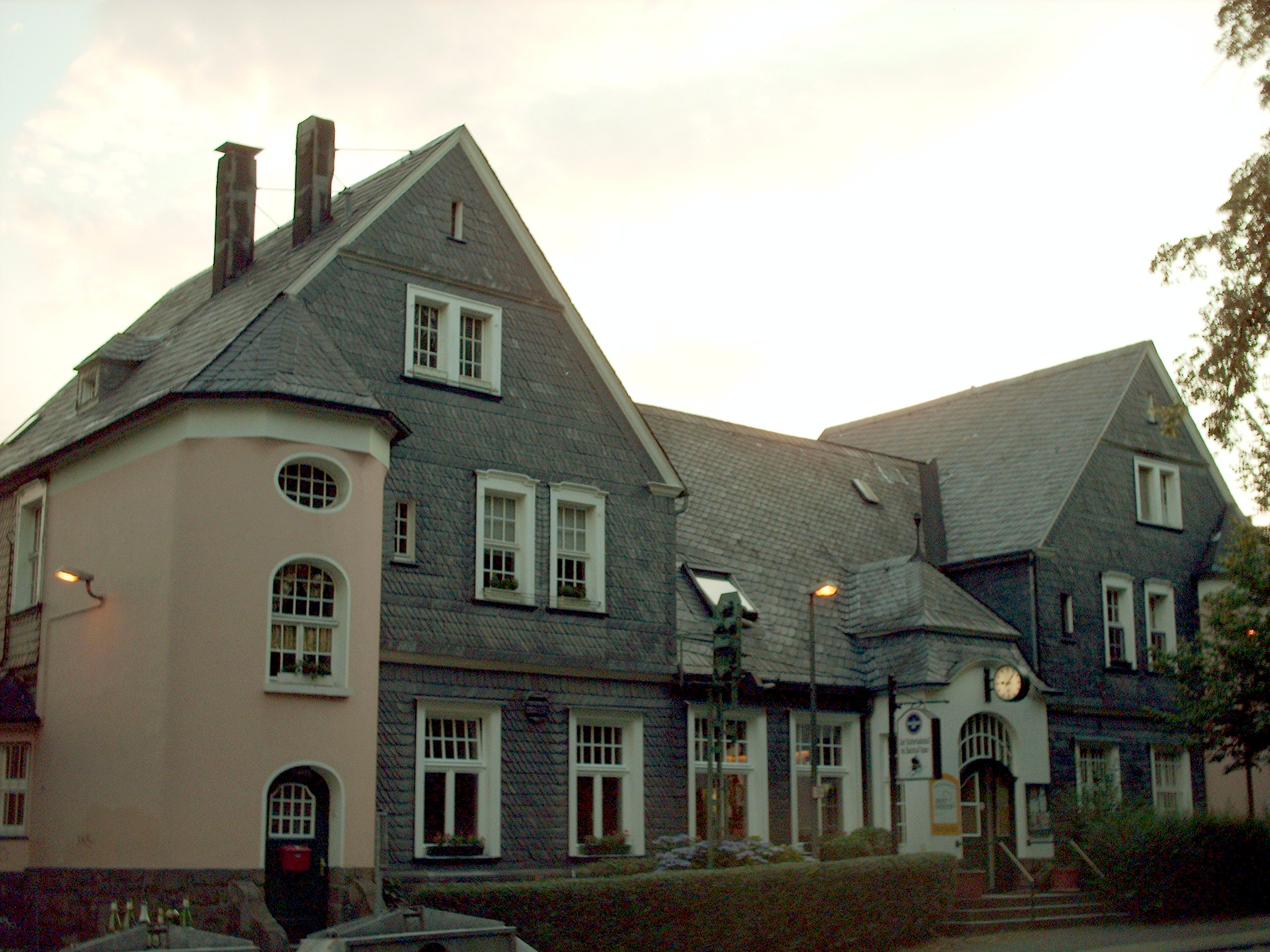
- Station building, now used as a tavern

General information
- Location: Eisenbahnstr. 2, Haan, NRW; Germany
- Coordinates: 51°11′17″N 6°59′53″E
- Lines: Gruiten–Köln-Deutz (KBS 455)
- Platforms: 2

Construction
- Accessible: Yes

Other information
- Station code: 2442
- DS100 code: KHAN
- IBNR: 8002490
- Category: 5
- Fare zone: VRR: 642; VRS: 1640 (VRR transitional tariff)
- Website: www.bahnhof.de

History
- Opened: 1885

Services
Preceding station	National Express Germany	Following station
Solingen Hbf towards Bonn-Mehlem	RB 48 (Rhein-Wupper-Bahn)	Gruiten towards Wuppertal-Oberbarmen
Location

Haan station is a through station in the town of Haan in the German state of North Rhine-Westphalia. It has two platform tracks and it is classified by Deutsche Bahn as a category 5 station.

== History ==
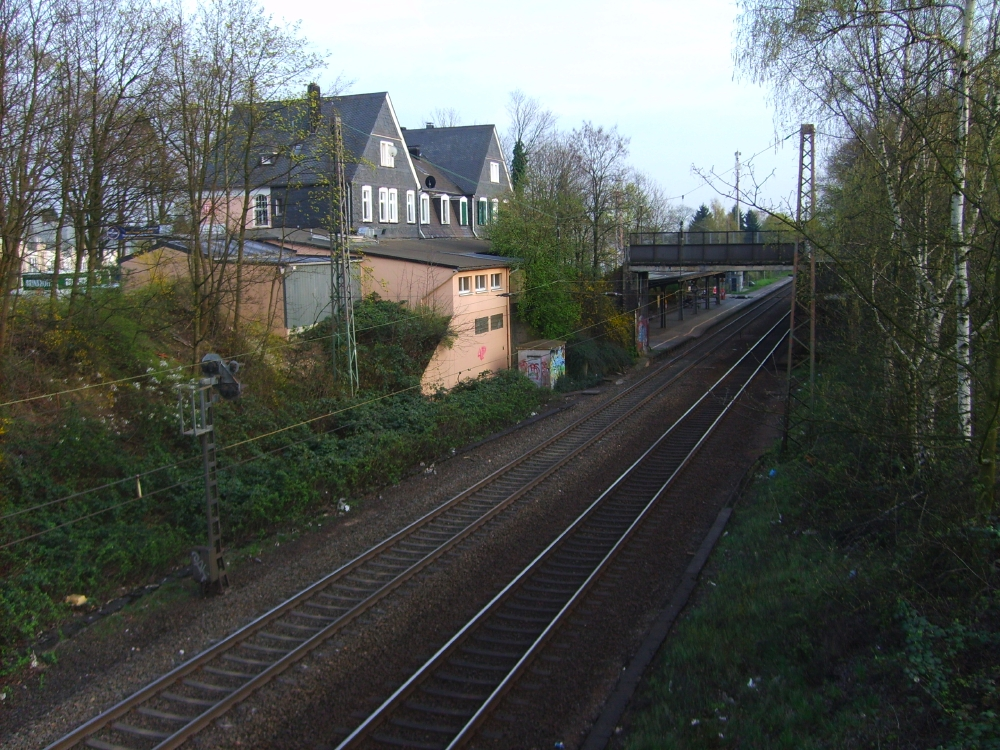
View of the station before the alterations in 2007

The station was opened in 1885 on the Gruiten–Köln-Deutz railway, which was completed between Gruiten and Opladen by the Bergisch-Märkische Railway Company on 25 September 1867. The station building, which is a replica of a station in Massachusetts, was finished in 1899. Since 26 May 1993, it has been heritage-listed. Until the 1980s, there was a freight yard located at the present site of the construction market in Böttingerstraße. In 2007, the station surroundings were redesigned and bicycle parking and additional car parking were built.

== Transport services ==
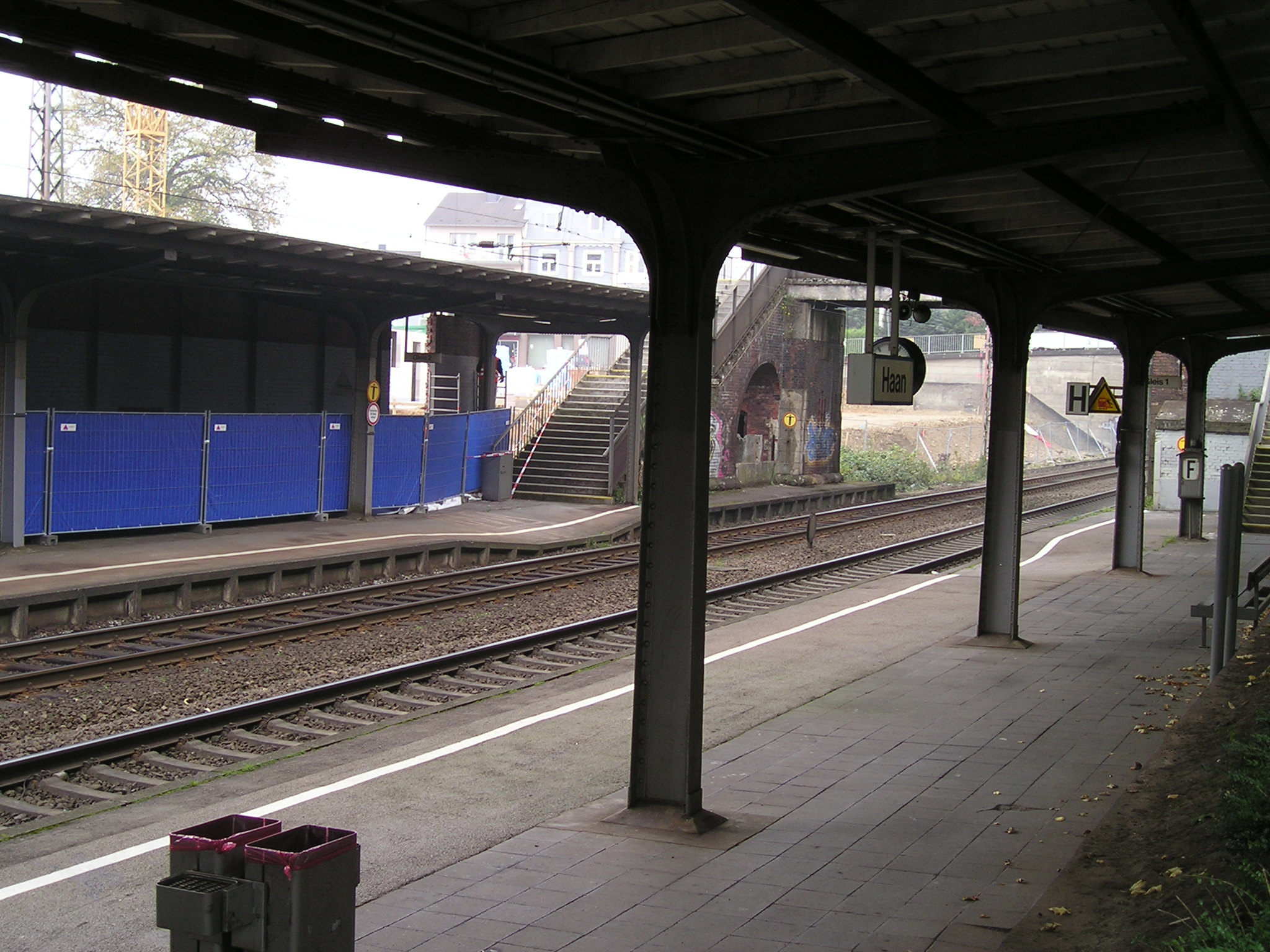
Platforms

The station is served by the Rhein-Wupper-Bahn (RB 48) between Wuppertal-Oberbarmen and Cologne twice an hour during the day, with one train an hour to/from Bonn-Mehlem.

It is also served by four bus routes operated by Rheinbahn: O1 (every 20–40 minutes), 784 (20), 786 (20–60) and 792 (20–60).
