= Erkrath =

- Town
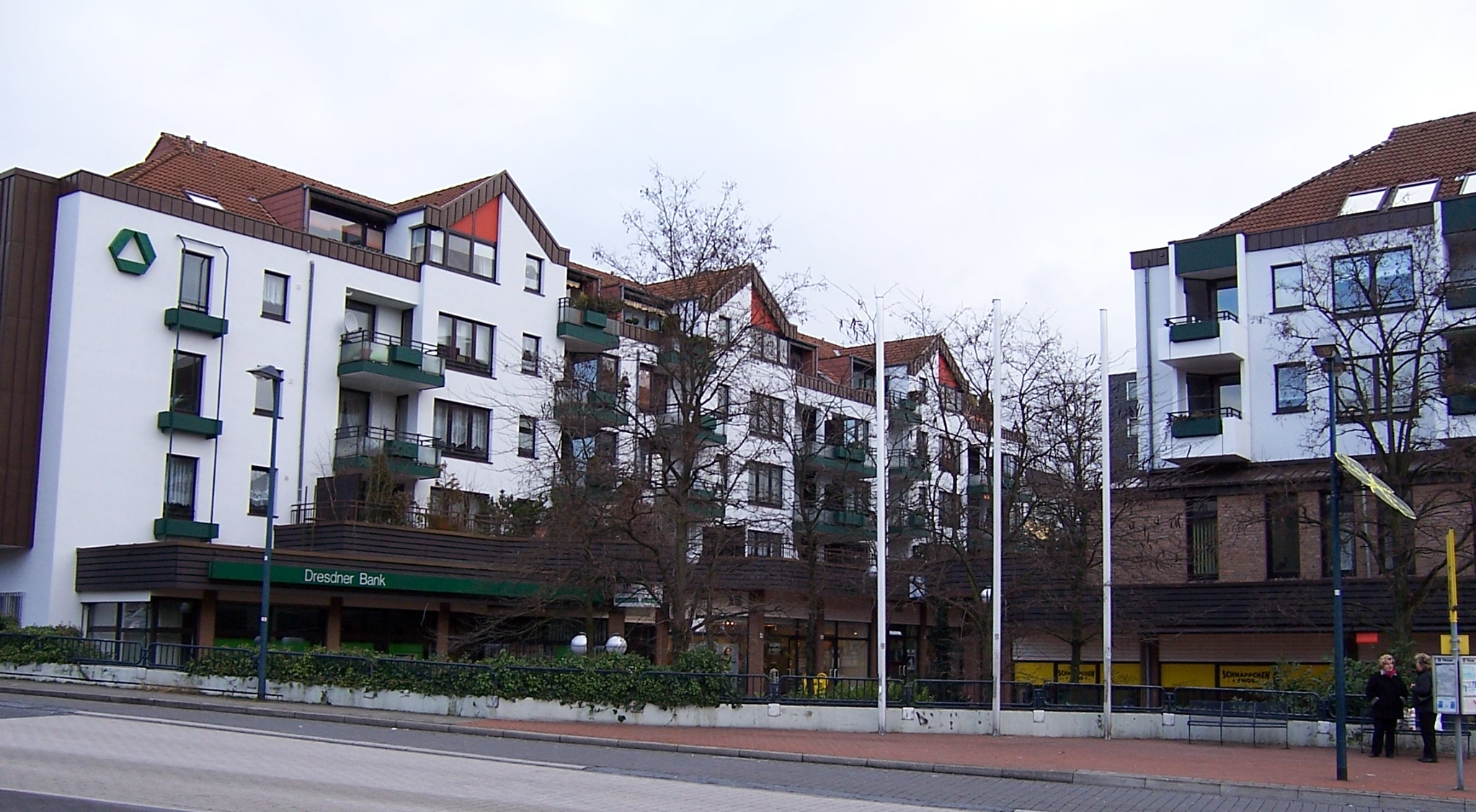

- Coat of arms

- Location of Erkrath within Mettmann district
- Interactive map of Erkrath
- Location within Germany Location within North Rhine-Westphalia
- Coordinates: 51°13′26″N 06°54′53″E
- Country: Germany
- State: North Rhine-Westphalia
- Admin. region: Düsseldorf
- District: Mettmann
- Subdivisions: 3

Government
  - Mayor (2020–25): Christoph Schultz (CDU)

Area
  - Total: 26.88 km^{2} (10.38 sq mi)
- Elevation: 68 m (223 ft)

Population (2025-12-31)
  - Total: 43,555
  - Density: 1,620/km^{2} (4,197/sq mi)
- Time zone: UTC+01:00 (CET)
  - Summer (DST): UTC+02:00 (CEST)
- Postal codes: 40699
- Dialling codes: 0211, 02104, 02129, 02103
- Vehicle registration: ME
- Website: www.erkrath.de

Erkrath (German pronunciation: [ˈɛʁkʁaːt]) is a town in the district of Mettmann, in North Rhine-Westphalia, Germany.

== Geography ==
Erkrath is situated on the river Düssel, directly east of Düsseldorf and west of Wuppertal, close to the famous Neandertal. It has two stations, Erkrath station, which is served by Rhine-Ruhr S-Bahn line S 8, and Erkrath Nord station, which is served by S-Bahn line S 28, both at 20-minute intervals.

== History ==
In that part of Neandertal, which is located in Erkrath, in the summer of 1856, quarry workers discovered the fossilised remains of what became known as the Neanderthal man or Homo neanderthalensis in Feldhof cave. The name Erkrath was first mentioned in 1148. Erkrath received town rights in 1966. In 1975, the municipality of Hochdahl was incorporated into Erkrath. As well its former borough Unterbach was incorporated into Düsseldorf. Only a part of Unterbach called Unterfeldhaus remained as now a borough of its own with Erkrath. Erkrath today has three local parts: Erkrath, Hochdahl and Unterfeldhaus.

== Population ==
Historical population

Year	Pop.	±% p.a.
1965	19,011	—
1970	28,485	+8.42%
1975	36,137	+4.87%
1980	43,701	+3.87%
1985	44,628	+0.42%
1990	47,659	+1.32%
1995	49,572	+0.79%

Year	Pop.	±% p.a.
2000	48,767	−0.33%
2005	47,432	−0.55%
2010	45,963	−0.63%
2015	44,086	−0.83%
2020	43,878	−0.09%
2025	43,555	−0.15%

Source: Landesdatabank Nordrhein-Westfalen

== Mayors ==
- Johann Kaiser (1898–1907) (the old town hall was built in 1899)
- Franz Zahren (1907–1930)
- Werner Hallauer (1930–1935)
- Heinrich Rasche (1935–1945), NSDAP, later FDP
- Wilhelm Broch (1945–1946)
- August Westerholz (1946), SPD
- Hermann Moritz (1946–1949), CDU
- Alex Bendt (1949–1954), SPD
- Gertrud Thomé (later: Küpper) (1954–1956), CDU
- Alex Bendt (1956–1961), SPD
- Gertrud Küpper (geb. Thomé) (1961–1963), CDU
- Johannes van Oost (1963–1964),
- Gertrud Küpper (geb. Thomé) (1964–1972), CDU
- Hans Weyer (1972–1974), SPD
- Aloys Kiefer (1975–1983), CDU
- Gloria Ziller (1983–1989), CDU
- Rudolf Unger (1989–1999), SPD
- Arno Werner (1999–2015), CDU
- Christoph Schultz (since 2015), CDU

== Gallery ==
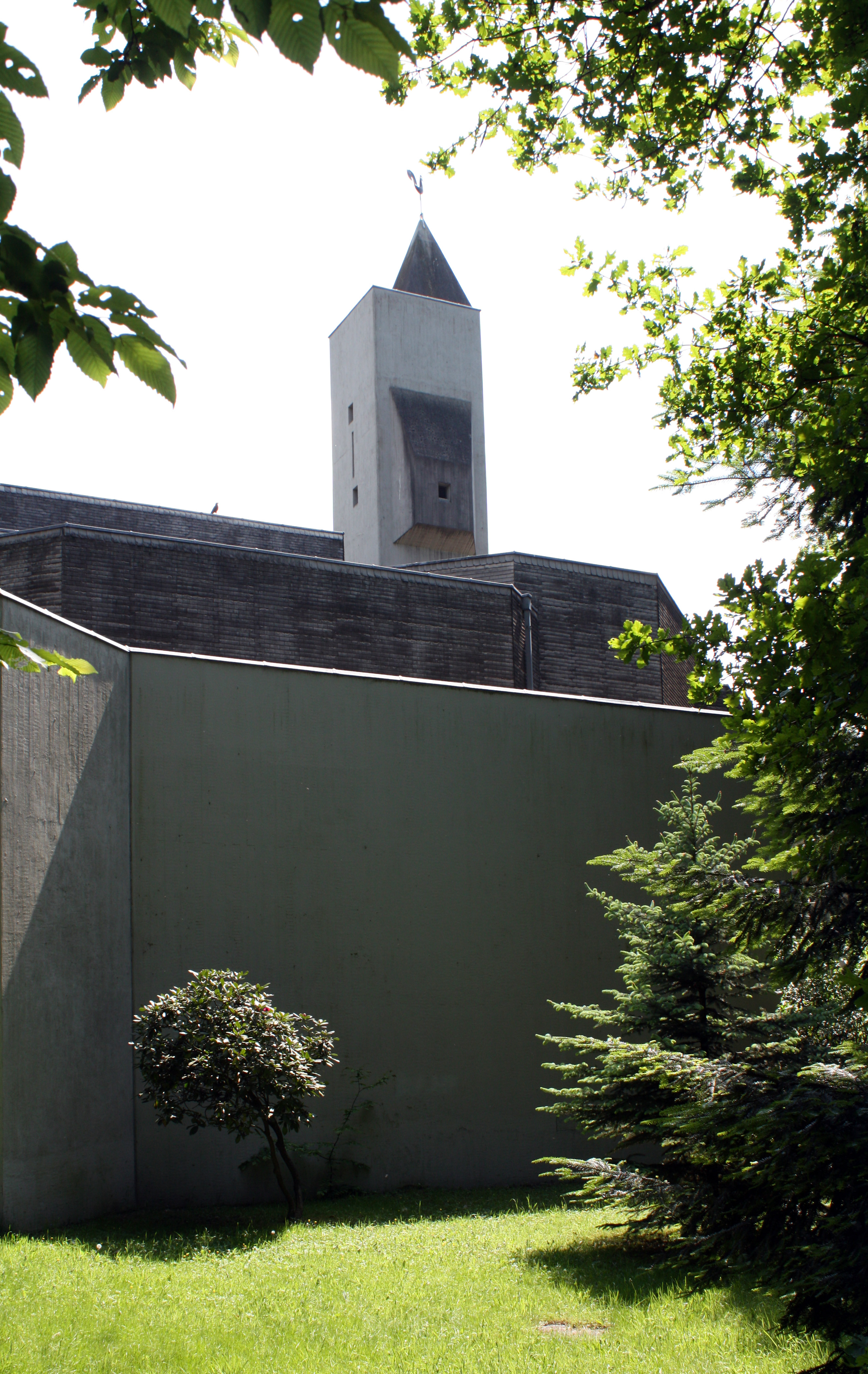
Heilig-Geist-Kirche (Erkrath)

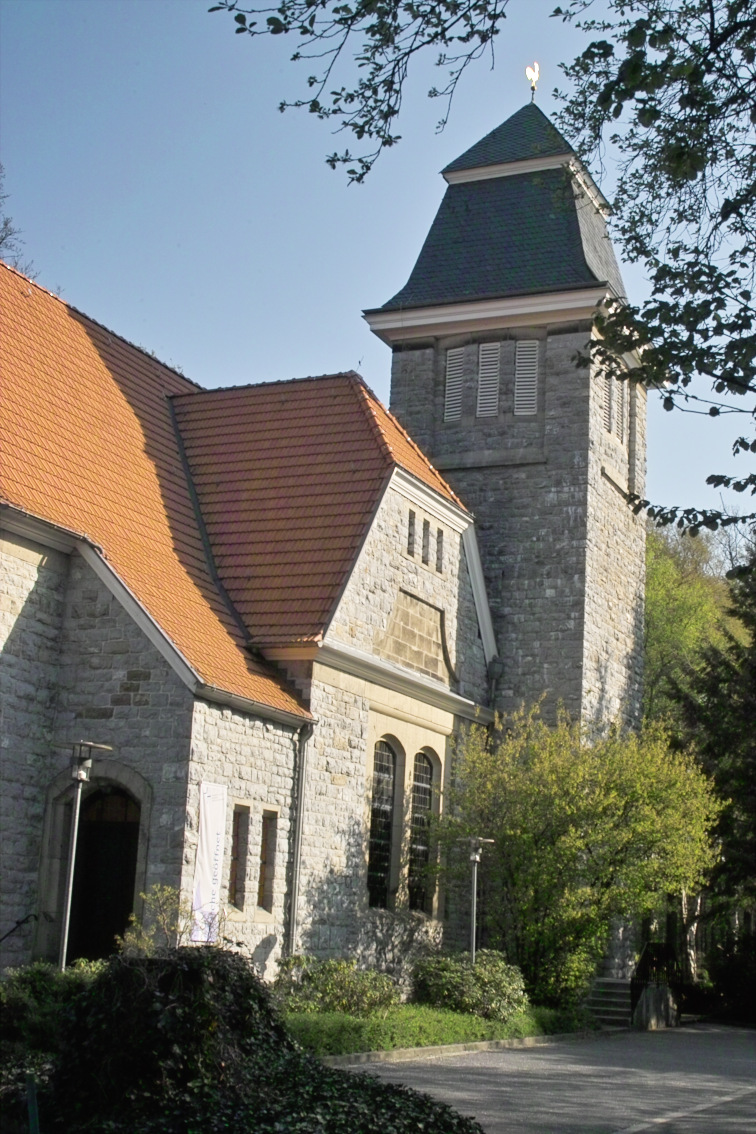
Neanderkirche (Erkrath)

== Twin towns – sister cities ==
Erkrath is twinned with:

- West Lancashire, England, United Kingdom
- Columbia, Maryland, United States

Erkrath's twin town partnership with Cergy-Pontoise, France was dissolved in 2019.

== Notable people ==
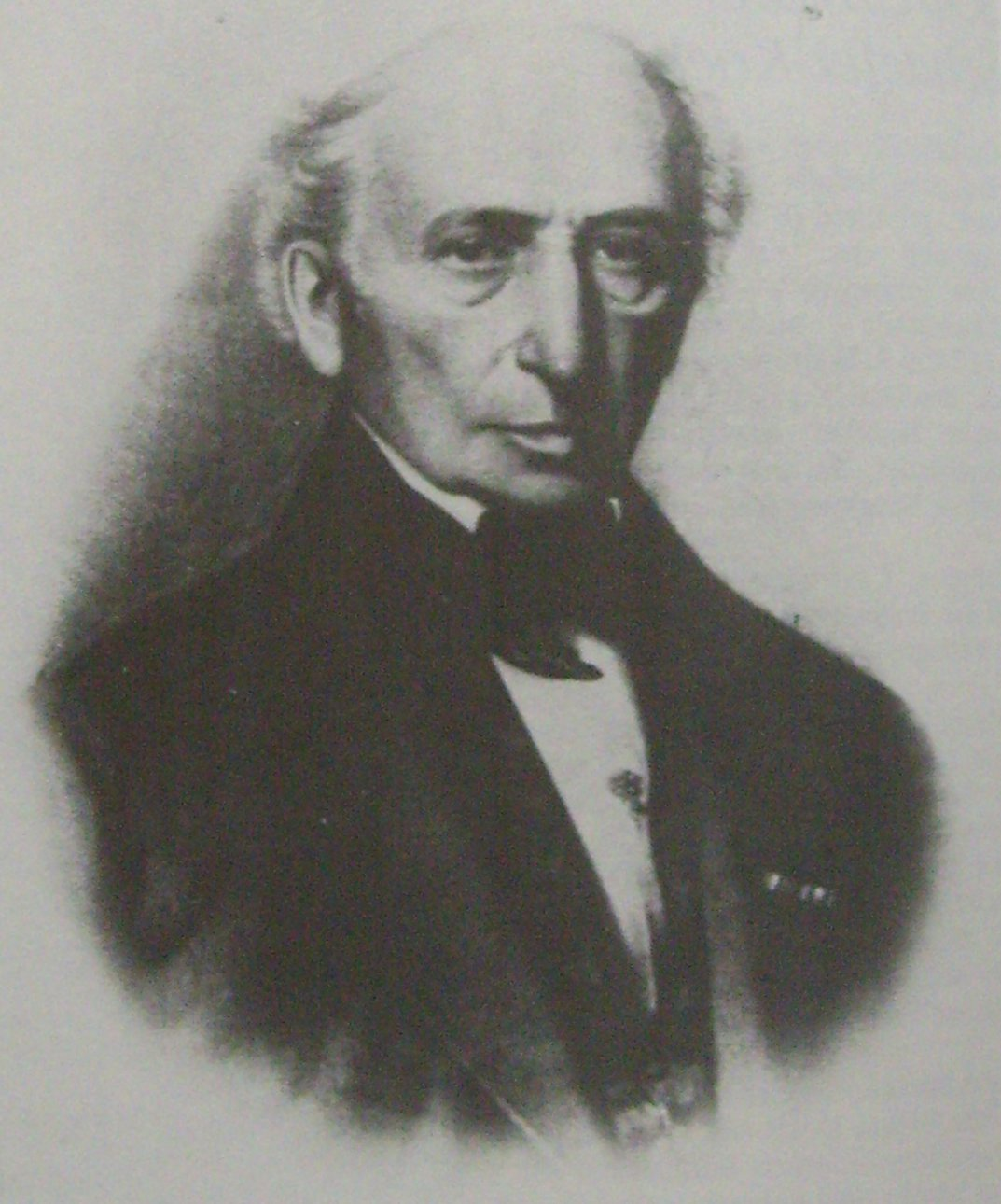
Johann Heinrich Bongard around 1840

- Klaus Allofs (born 1956), German footballer, manager of VfL Wolfsburg, lived for a long time in Erkrath-Unterfeldhaus
- Thomas Allofs (born 1959), German footballer, lives in Erkrath-Unterfeldhaus and runs a disposal company in Düsseldorf
- Heiner Baltes (born 1949), German footballer
- Johann Heinrich Bongard (1779–1857), eye and wound surgeon and royal Prussian Hofrat, first author of a publication on the Neandertal
- Klaus Hänsch (born 1938), former President of the European Parliament
- Friedrich Hünermann (1886–1969), Catholic theologian and auxiliary bishop in Aachen
- Werner Koch (born 1961), German developer of Free Software and founder of the GNU Privacy Guard (GnuPG or GPG), lives in Hochdahl
- Manfred Lahnstein (born 1937) politician (SPD), former Federal Finance Minister and Member of the Management Board and Supervisory Board of Bertelsmann AG
- Flemming Lund (born 1952), Danish footballer for Fortuna Düsseldorf and Rot-Weiss Essen, lived in Hochdahl

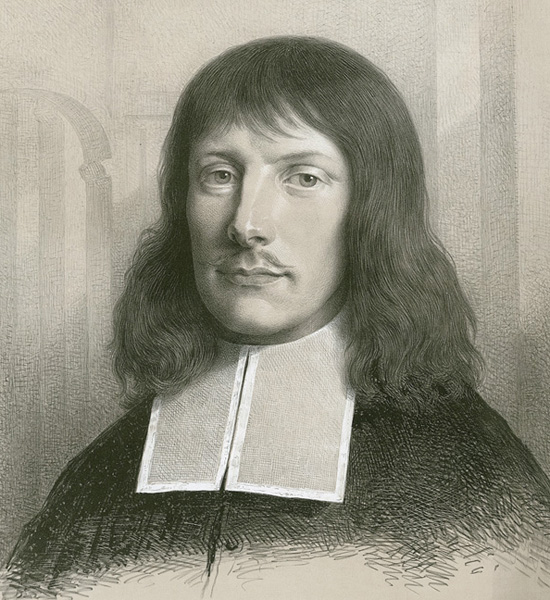
Joachim Neander

- Joachim Neander (c. 1650–1680) German pastor, church poet and composer, first author about the Neandertal
- Aleksandar Ristić (born 1944), footballer and coach (among others Fortuna Düsseldorf), lived in Erkrath at this time
- Karl Sudhoff (1853–1938), founder of the medical history as a scientific discipline in Germany, was from 1885 to 1905 doctor of the Hochdahl iron foundry and Armenian physician, later also councilor of Hochdahl-Millrath
- Toni Turek (1919–1984), national goalkeeper and world champion of Bern 1954, lived during his years with Fortuna Düsseldorf and his world title in Erkrath. 50 years after Bern the Erkrath Stadium was named after him ("Toni-Turek-Stadion", Freiheitsstraße 46).
- Karl Wenders (1841–1905), mayor of Neuss, Member of Reichstag and member of Landtag
