= Düsseldorf–Elberfeld railway =

Railway line in Germany

Düsseldorf-Elberfeld
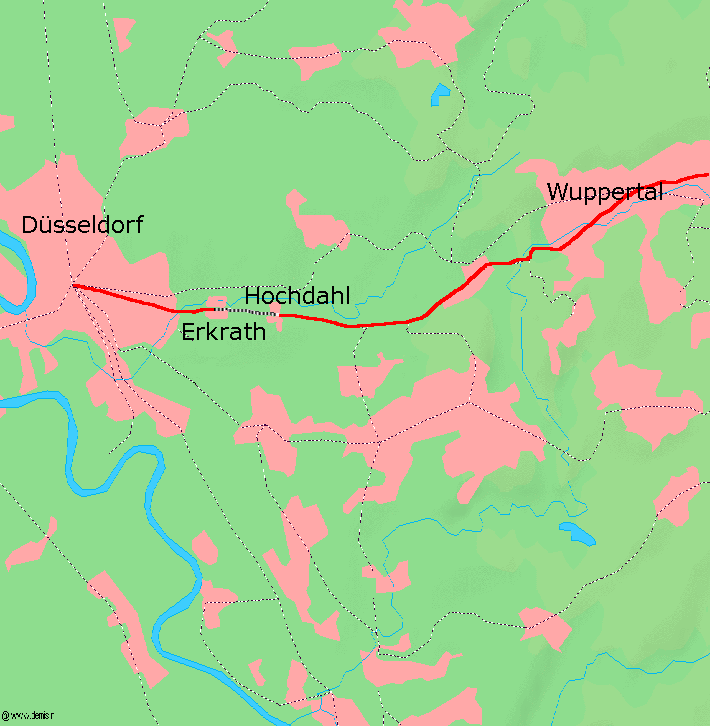

Overview
- Line number: 2550 (Long distance); 2525 (S-Bahn)
- Locale: North Rhine-Westphalia

Service
- Route number: 455, 485 (Long distance); 450.8, 450.9, 450.11 (S-Bahn)

Technical
- Line length: 27 km (17 mi)
- Number of tracks: 2:Wuppertal–Gruiten junction Düsseldorf-Gerresheim–Düsseldorf (S-Bahn station)
- Track gauge: 1,435 mm (4 ft 8 1/2 in) standard gauge
- Electrification: 15 kV 16.7 Hz
- Operating speed: 130 km/h (max)
- Maximum incline: 3.3

The Düsseldorf–Elberfeld railway is a 27 km long main line railway in Germany, originally built by the Düsseldorf-Elberfeld Railway Company, connecting Düsseldorf and Elberfeld (now Wuppertal) via Erkrath, Hochdahl and Vohwinkel. It is served by Regional Express, Regionalbahn and S-Bahn trains.

== History ==
The Düsseldorf–Elberfeld railway was built from 1838 to 1841 by the Düsseldorf-Elberfeld Railway Company (Düsseldorf-Elberfelder Eisenbahn-Gesellschaft, DEE), which had been established for this purpose. It was taken over by the Bergisch-Märkische Railway Company (Bergisch-Märkische Eisenbahn-Gesellschaft, BME) in 1857 and a continuous second track was built by 1865.

=== Realignment of lines in Düsseldorf ===
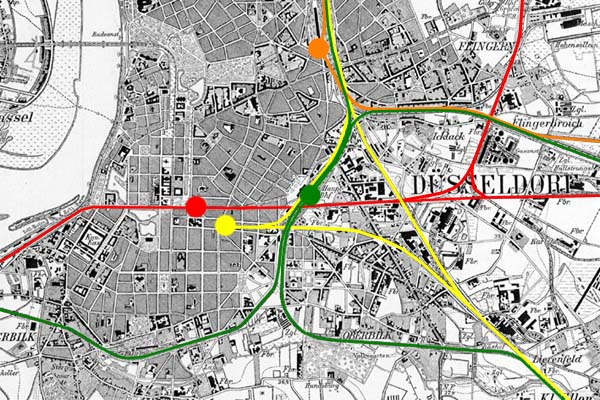
Realignment of the lines, former BME line in red, new combined lines in green

The Düsseldorf Central Station opened on 1 October 1891 replaced the three stations of the recently nationalised, formerly (nominally) private railway companies. The new line from the Düsseldorf station ran north along the existing route of the trunk line of the Cologne-Minden Railway Company to Wehrhahn CME junction. It then swung east and followed the Düsseldorf-Derendorf–Dortmund Süd line of the Rhenish Railway Company. East of the intersection with the Troisdorf–Mülheim-Speldorf freight line it rejoined it original route. The Düsseldorf Valley Railway separates at the same place and runs to the northeast.

== Erkrath-Hochdahl incline ==
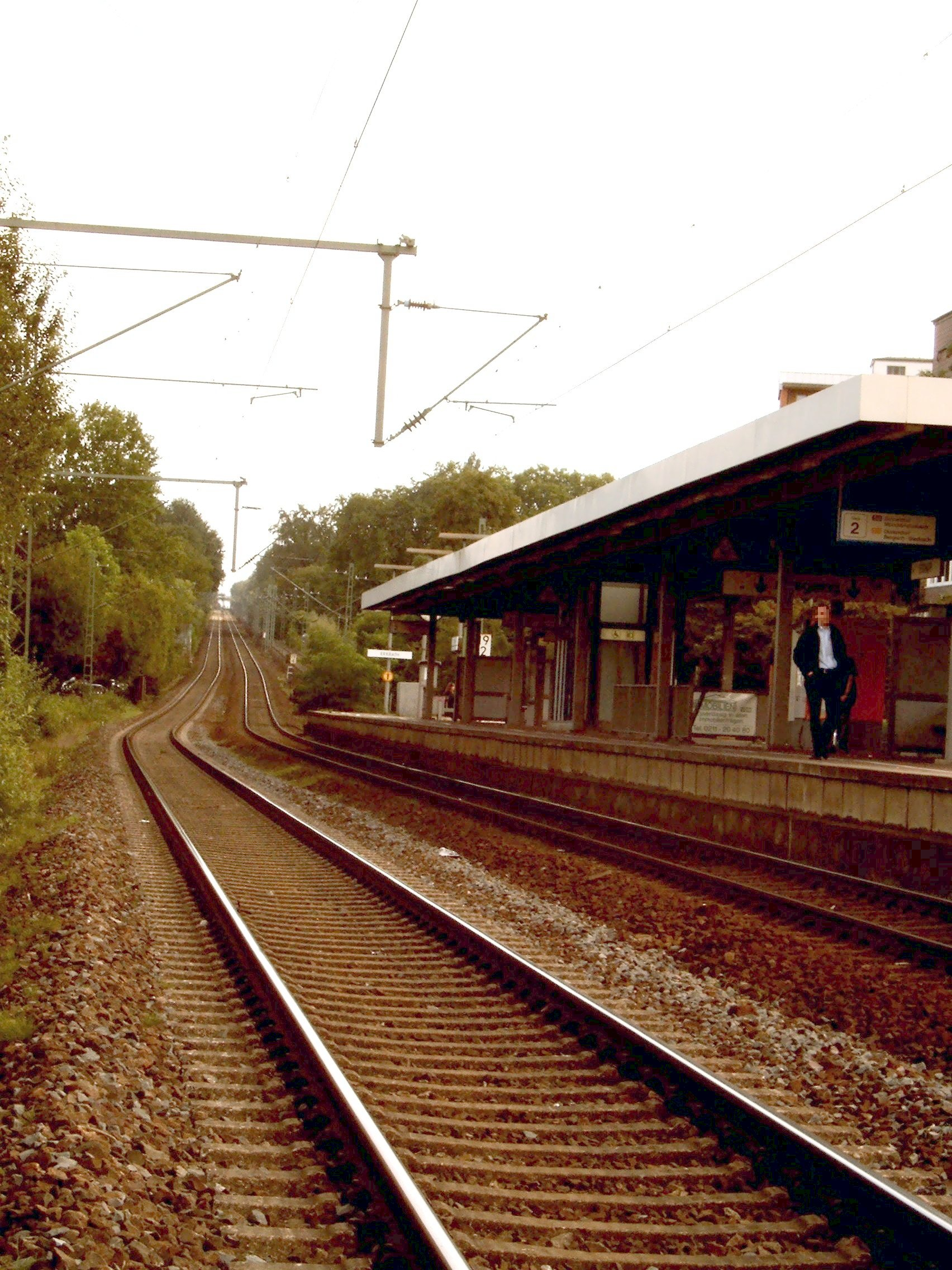
Beginning of the climb in Erkrath station

The biggest challenge in the construction of the line was dealing with the climb between Erkrath and Hochdahl. The line has a gradient of 3.33% and rises 82 m (269 ft) in about 2 1/2 km (1 1/2 mi). For more than one hundred years, this was the steepest main line in Europe. For many years trains had to be hauled by cable, originally driven by a stationary steam engine. A few months later haulage by cable attached to a stationary steam engine was changed to haulage by cable attached via pulleys to a locomotive running downhill on an additional track. With the duplication of the remainder of the line in 1865, the steep section of line became three-track, until the electrification of the line in 1963. The third track was rebuilt in 1985, as part of the additional third track built for the planned S-Bahn line. In 1926, cable haulage on the incline was replaced by bank engines.

== Current situation ==
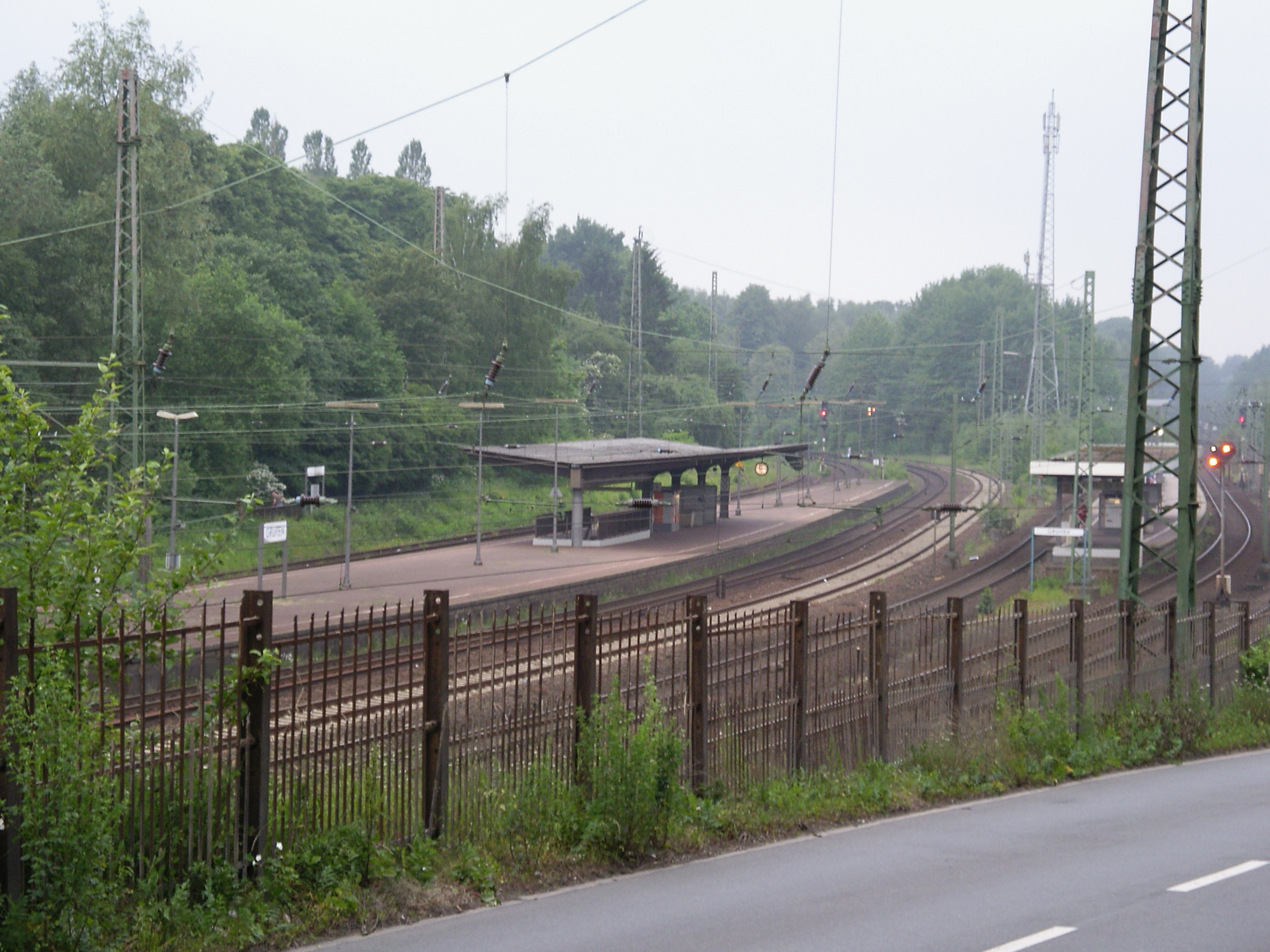
Gruiten station, with the Solingen line to the left, the two line S-Bahn station to the right and the single-line long distance in front and further right.

Between Gruiten junction and the Düsseldorf-Gerresheim station the long distance line is only single track. Regional Express lines RE 4 Wupper-Express and RE 13 Maas-Wupper-Express run on this line, stopping only at Düsseldorf, Vohwinkel and Wuppertal. S-Bahn line S 8 services runs on the parallel two-track S-Bahn line.
