= Düsseldorf-Elberfeld Railway Company =

Railway in Germany

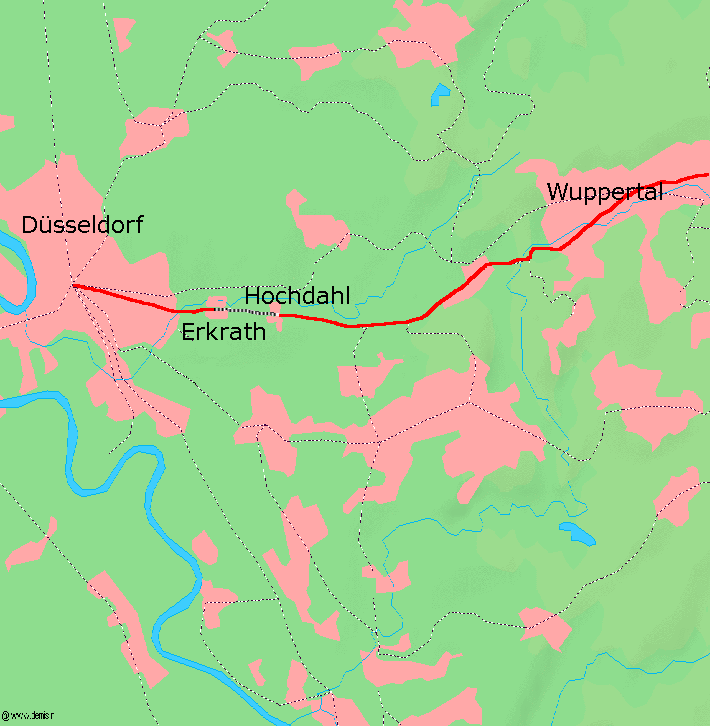
The Düsseldorf-Elberfeld Railway Company's line

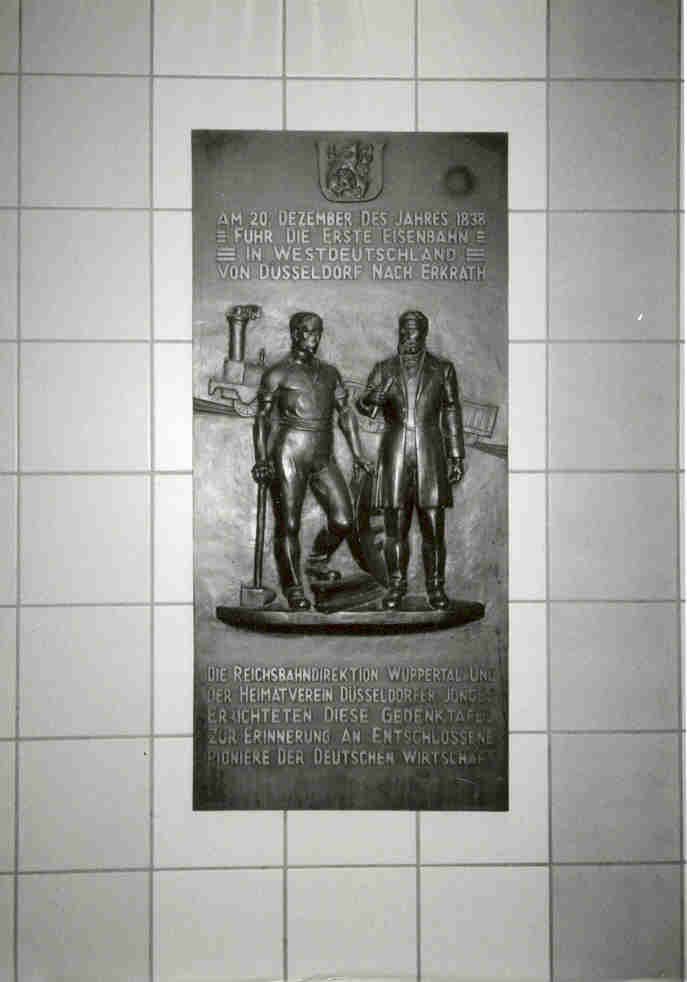
Commemorative plaque for company's founders in Düsseldorf Hauptbahnhof

The Düsseldorf-Elberfeld Railway Company (German: Düsseldorf-Elberfelder Eisenbahn-Gesellschaft, DEE) was founded in October 1835 and officially recognised by a Prussian government statute on 23 September 1837. This gave the company a concession for the construction and operation of the 26 kilometre long Düsseldorf–Elberfeld line via Erkrath, Hochdahl and Vohwinkel. One of the founders was the Elberfeld banker and later Prussian Minister of Commerce and Industry, August von der Heydt (1801–1874).

== Construction ==
The construction of the first section from Düsseldorf to Erkrath (8.12 km) began on 9 April 1838 and it was opened for freight traffic on 20 December 1838. It was the first steam railway in western Germany (except for the short and sometimes horse-hauled Bavarian Ludwig Railway), the first in Prussia and the fifth in Germany. The Düsseldorf station was originally located at the south end of Königsallee rather than at the current Central Station.

The next section of the line from Erkrath to (Wuppertal) Vohwinkel (12.61 km) was put into operation for freight on 10 April 1841. The opening of the remaining 5.45 km to Steinbeck station in Elberfeld (now part of Wuppertal) followed on 3 September 1841, also only for freight. Passenger operations on the line started on 1 December 1841.

== Erkrath–Hochdahl incline ==
The biggest challenge in the construction of the line was dealing with the climb between Erkrath and Hochdahl. Because of the steep slope (1 in 30 (3.3%)) in this section for a long time trains had to be hauled by cable, originally driven by a stationary steam engine. A few months later haulage by cable attached to a stationary steam engine was changed to haulage by cable attached via pulleys to a locomotive running downhill on an additional track. In 1926, cable haulage on the incline was replaced by bank engines.

== Takeover ==
During its existence the DEE only operated its original line. After the Bergisch-Märkische Railway Company (BME) was established on 18 October 1843 and which was also based in Elberfeld, the two companies worked closely together. The BME acquired the property of the DEE and its operating rights on 22 September 1856.
