= Wuppertal-Vohwinkel station =

Railway station in Wuppertal, Germany

Wuppertal Vohwinkel
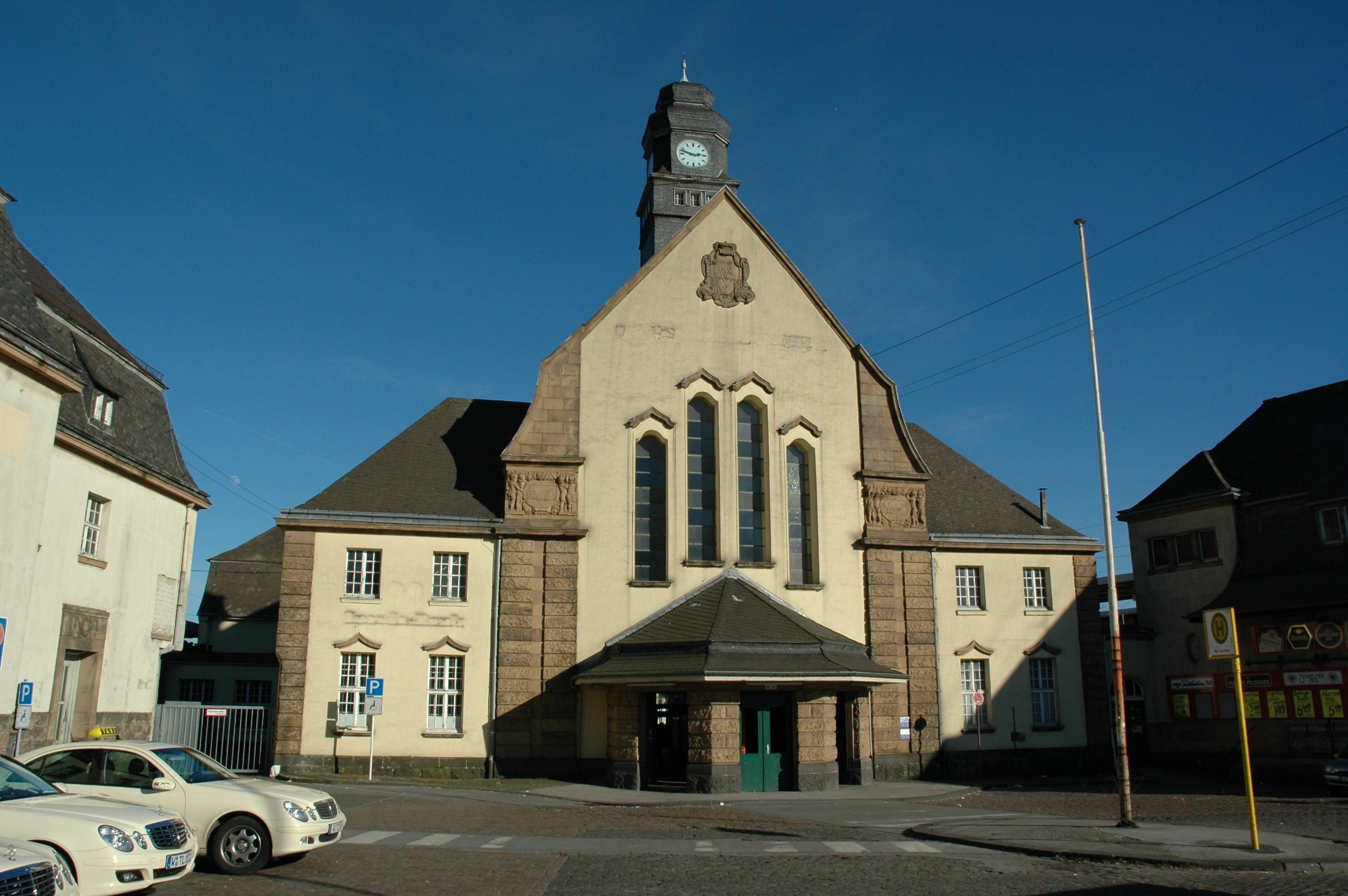
- Entrance building

General information
- Location: Bahnhofstr. 14-16, Wuppertal, NRW; Germany
- Coordinates: 51°14′2.7″N 7°4′17.15″E
- Owner: Deutsche Bahn
- Operator: DB Netz; DB Station&Service
- Lines: Düsseldorf–Elberfeld; Gruiten–Köln-Deutz; W-Vohwinkel–E-Überruhr
- Platforms: 8

Construction
- Accessible: Yes
- Architectural style: Art Nouveau

Other information
- Station code: 6937
- DS100 code: KWV
- IBNR: 8006718
- Category: 3
- Fare zone: VRR: 656; VRS: 1650 (VRR transitional zone)
- Website: www.bahnhof.de

History
- Opened: 10 April 1841
Services
Preceding station	National Express Germany	Following station
Düsseldorf Hbf towards Aachen Hbf	RE 4 (Wupper-Express)	Wuppertal Hbf towards Dortmund Hbf
Gruiten towards Bonn-Mehlem	RB 48 (Rhein-Wupper-Bahn)	Wuppertal Hbf towards Wuppertal-Oberbarmen
Preceding station		Following station
Düsseldorf Hbf towards Venlo	RE 13	Wuppertal Hbf towards Hamm (Westf) Hbf
Preceding station	DB Regio NRW	Following station
Velbert-Neviges towards Wesel	RE 49	Wuppertal Hbf Terminus
Preceding station	Rhine-Ruhr S-Bahn	Following station
Gruiten towards Mönchengladbach Hbf	S8	Wuppertal-Sonnborn towards Hagen Hbf
Wülfrath-Aprath towards Haltern am See or Recklinghausen Hbf	S9	Wuppertal-Sonnborn towards Hagen Hbf
Hahnenfurth/Düssel towards Kaarster See	S28	Wuppertal Zoologischer Garten towards Wuppertal Hbf
Gruiten towards Langenfeld	S68	Terminus
Location

Vohwinkel station is the most western station in the city of Wuppertal, located in the district of Vohwinkel. It is a triangular station, built at a railway junction.

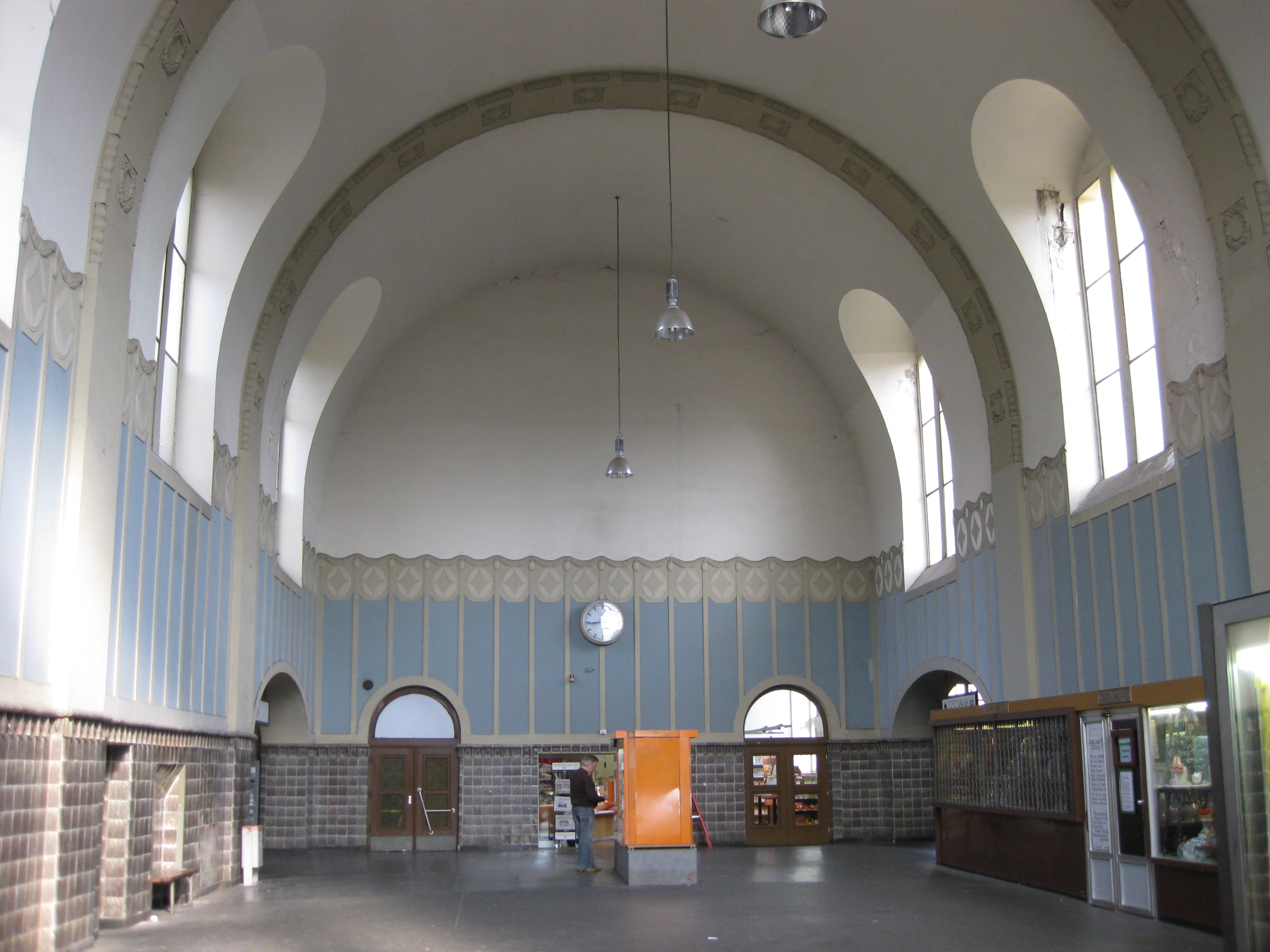
Interior

== History ==
The original station was built slightly further west than the present station in 1841 by the Düsseldorf-Elberfeld Railway Company. The Prince William Railway was extended to Vohwinkel in 1848, creating a railway junction. The present building was built at the beginning of the 20th century by the Prussian state railways to the design of Alexander Rüdell.

In the early 20th Century a three km-long marshalling yard was built to the west of the station, but it has since been closed and demolished.

In addition to the Düsseldorf-Elberfeld through line and the branch to the former Prince William line (now the line to Essen), in the past there was a railway line connecting to the now closed Wuppertal Northern Railway and the now closed Corkscrew line from Solingen terminated there.

== Services ==
No long-distance services stop at the station, but it is served by the Wupper-Express (RE 4), the Maas-Wupper-Express (RE 13), the Wupper-Lippe-Express and the (RE 49) Regional-Express services and the Rhein-Wupper-Bahn (RB 48) Regionalbahn service and lines S8, S9, S28 and S68 of the Rhine-Ruhr S-Bahn.

Lines	Route	Frequency
RE 4	Aachen – Herzogenrath – Mönchengladbach – Düsseldorf – Wuppertal-Vohwinkel – Wuppertal – Hagen – Dortmund	60 mins
RE 13	Venlo – Viersen – Mönchengladbach – Düsseldorf – Wuppertal-Vohwinkel – Wuppertal – Hagen – Hamm (Westf)	60 mins
RE 49	Wesel – Oberhausen – Mülheim – Essen – Wuppertal-Vohwinkel – Wuppertal	60 mins
RB 48	Bonn-Mehlem – Bonn – Cologne – Solingen – Wuppertal-Vohwinkel – Wuppertal – Wuppertal-Oberbarmen	30 mins
S8	Mönchengladbach – Neuss – Düsseldorf – Wuppertal-Vohwinkel – Wuppertal (– Schwelm – Hagen)	20 min
S9	(Recklinghausen / Haltern am See –) Gladbeck - Bottrop – Essen – Velbert-Langenberg – Wuppertal-Vohwinkel – Wuppertal (– Schwelm – Gevelsberg - Hagen)	30 min Gladbeck - Wuppertal
S28	Kaarst – Neuss – Düsseldorf – Mettmann Zentrum – Wuppertal-Vohwinkel – Wuppertal	20/40 min
S68	Langenfeld (Rheinl) – Düsseldorf – Wuppertal-Vohwinkel	Several services in the peak, in the peak direction

It is a short walk from both Bruch and Vohwinkel (Schwebebahn) on the Wuppertal Schwebebahn (Wuppertal Suspension Railway)
