= S68 (Rhine-Ruhr S-Bahn) =

Line S 68 is an S-Bahn line on the Rhine-Ruhr network. It is operated by DB Regio. It was established on 13 December 2009. It is a relief service operating during peak hours on weekdays between Wuppertal-Vohwinkel and Langenfeld via Düsseldorf Hbf. It was operated using a double set of class 420. Since November 2022, operations have been suspended due to staff shortages.The route was operated again from summer 2024 to autumn 2024. With the timetable change in December 2025, operations resumed for parts of the following year. However, the line continues to struggle with a lack of reliability.

Line S 68 runs:

- from Wuppertal-Vohwinkel to Düsseldorf over the Düsseldorf–Elberfeld railway opened by the Düsseldorf-Elberfeld Railway Company between 1838 and 1841,
- from Düsseldorf to Langenfeld over the Cologne–Duisburg railway, opened by the Cologne-Minden Railway Company in 1845.
