= S8 (Rhine-Ruhr S-Bahn) =

Line S8 is an S-Bahn line operated by DB Regio on the Rhine-Ruhr network. It runs from Hagen Hauptbahnhof in the east to Mönchengladbach Hauptbahnhof in the west via Wuppertal Hauptbahnhof, Düsseldorf Hauptbahnhof and Neuss Hauptbahnhof. It is operated between Düsseldorf and Wuppertal-Oberbarmen station at 20-minute intervals using class 422 electric multiple units. One out of three trains continues to Hagen, running hourly. An S 9 service and three Regional-Express services (Wupper-Express, Rhein-Münsterland-Express and Maas-Wupper-Express) also operate between Wuppertal-Vohwinkel and Hagen each hour.

Line S 8 runs over lines built by various railway companies:

- from Mönchengladbach to Neuss on the Mönchengladbach–Düsseldorf railway, opened by the Aachen-Düsseldorf-Ruhrort Railway Company between 1852 and 1854
- from Neuss to near Düsseldorf-Hamm over the new line built with the Hamm Railway Bridge opened by the Bergisch-Märkische Railway Company on 24 July 1870,
- from Hamm to Gerresheim over the new line opened by the Prussian state railways on 1 October 1891 between the Hamm Railway bridge and Gerresheim as part of the construction of Düsseldorf Hauptbahnhof.
- from Gerresheim to Steinbeck over the Düsseldorf–Elberfeld railway opened by the Düsseldorf-Elberfeld Railway Company between 1838 and 1841,
- from Steinbeck to Wuppertal Hauptbahnhof over a link line opened by the Düsseldorf-Elberfeld Railway and the Bergisch-Märkische Railway on 28 December 1848,
- from Wuppertal to Schwelm over the Elberfeld–Dortmund railway built by the Bergisch-Märkische Railway Company between 1847 and 1849,
- a short section of the Witten–Schwelm railway from Schwelm towards Gevelsberg West opened by Deutsche Reichsbahn in 1934, and
- from Gevelsberg West to Hagen over the Düsseldorf-Derendorf–Dortmund Süd railway, built by the Rhenish Railway Company between 1873 and 1879 (except for a section between Hagen-Heubing and Hagen Hauptbahnhof built in 1894 by the Prussian state railways).

S-Bahn services commenced on the whole length of the route on 29 May 1988.
