= Langenfeld (Rheinland) station =

Railway station in Langenfeld (Rheinland), Germany

Langenfeld (Rheinl)
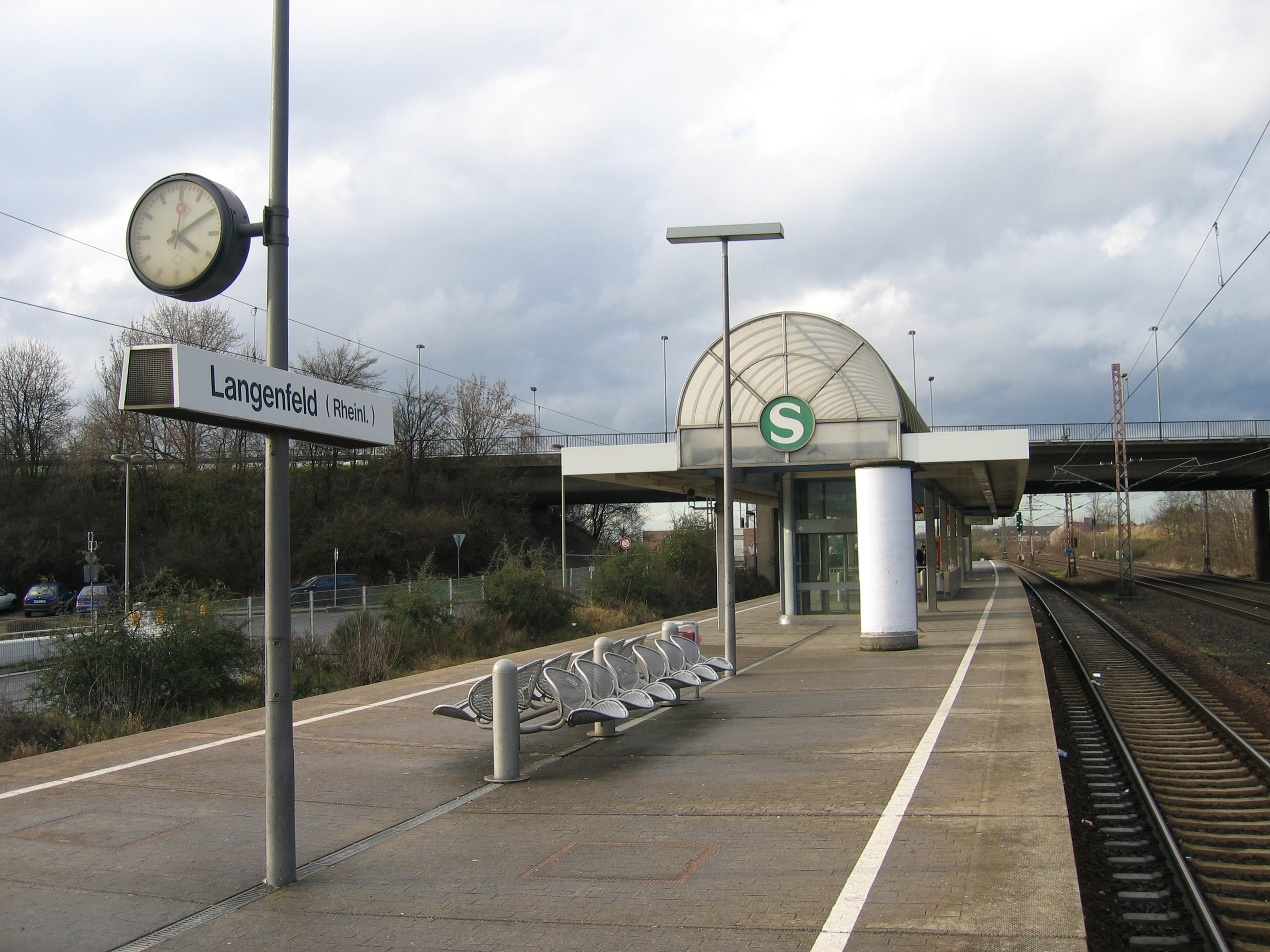

General information
- Location: Katzbergstr. 1, Langenfeld, NRW; Germany
- Coordinates: 51°06′10″N 6°56′17″E
- Lines: Cologne–Duisburg (KBS 450.6)
- Platforms: 2

Construction
- Accessible: Yes

Other information
- Station code: 3535
- DS100 code: KLA
- IBNR: 8003540
- Category: 5
- Fare zone: VRR: 730 and 732; VRS: 1730 (VRR transitional zone)
- Website: www.bahnhof.de

History
- Opened: 20 December 1845

Services
Preceding station	Rhine-Ruhr S-Bahn	Following station
Leverkusen-Rheindorf towards Köln-Nippes	S6	Langenfeld-Berghausen towards Essen Hbf
Terminus	S68	Langenfeld-Berghausen towards Wuppertal-Vohwinkel
Location

Langenfeld (Rheinland) station is located in the city of Langenfeld in the German state of North Rhine-Westphalia. It is on the Cologne–Duisburg line and is classified by Deutsche Bahn as a category 5 station. It is served by Rhine-Ruhr S-Bahn line S6 every 20 minutes, and by a few services of line S68, which start and terminate here, in the peak hour.

== Services ==
Currently, the station is served by two S-Bahn lines and seven bus routes.
