= Bundesgartenschau 2031 =

The Federal Horticultural Show 2031 (German: Bundesgartenschau 2031, BUGA 2031) will take place in Wuppertal, Germany, in 2031, making it the first garden show in the North Rhine-Westphalian city. The event is scheduled to run from April to October 2031 across three main areas in the west of the city, as well as smaller areas throughout the city, and will last for 180 days.

== History ==
An initial feasibility study was published in 2018 under the then-mayor Andreas Mucke. More detailed and further developed versions followed in 2021 and 2024. In November 2022, the Wuppertal city council voted by a majority to submit an application for the city to host a Federal Horticultural Show. Due to opposition to the project, primarily from the citizens' initiative "BUGA - not like this" ("BUGA - so nicht"), a public referendum was conducted in May 2022. Nearly 51.8% of the more than 93,000 participants voted in favor of the city applying to host the 2031 Federal Horticultural Show.

Following the official submission of the application on August 24, 2022, and the acceptance by the German Federal Horticultural Show Association (DBG) in October of the same year, the official agreement between the City of Wuppertal and the DBG was signed on March 28, 2023.

== Concept ==
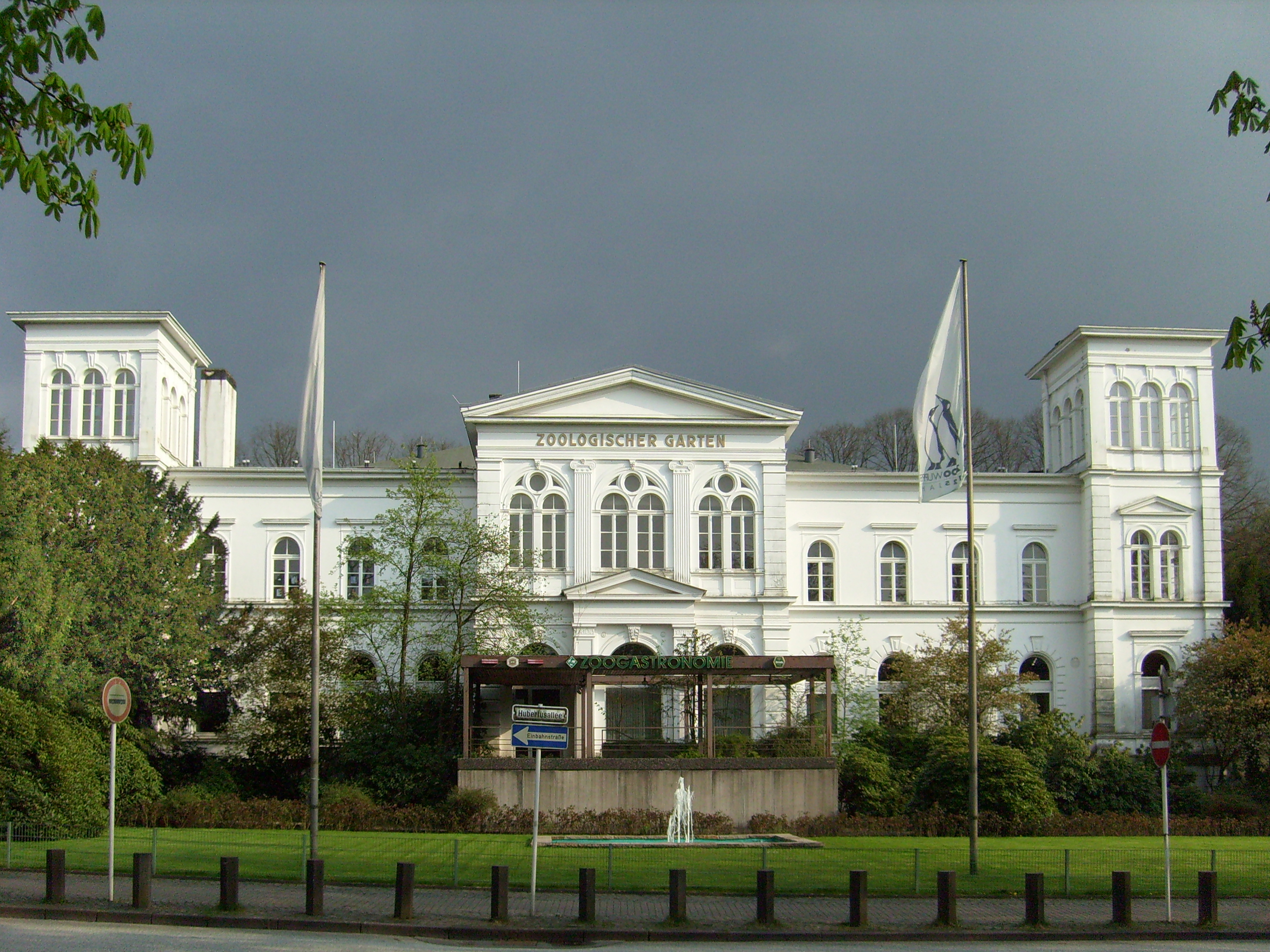
The Zoo restaurant (Zoo-Gaststätten)

The 2031 Federal Horticultural Show is to focus on three core areas in western Wuppertal: the Tesche residential area, the Zoological Garden, and the Wupper Gate. The Wuppertal Suspension Railway will provide visitor transport between the Tesche and Zoo areas.

The Tesche core area comprises the former locomotive shed northeast of the Wuppertal-Vohwinkel train station, the Homanndamm embankment located east of it along the former Nordbahn railway line, and the green spaces to the north between Grünewald Street and the Lüntenbeck district, also known as Tescher Stich and referred to in the project context as the Tescher Wiesen recreation area. Following the demolition of the locomotive shed, the area is currently being developed into a residential quarter by a private investor.

The Green Zoo core area includes, in particular, the Wuppertal Zoo with its 1883 Zoo restaurant and the adjacent green space with a bandstand. The 2031 Federal Horticultural Show will thus be the first Federal Horticultural Show to integrate a zoo into its concept.

The Wupperpforte core area encompassess parts of the Königshöhe forest on Wuppertal´s southern hills as well as parts of Nützenberg Park, including Kaiserhöhe, on Wuppertal´s northern hills.

The Königshöhe will be accessible via cable car. In the future, it will connect the valley near the Green Zoo with the Königshöhe. An intermediate station is planned at the Grüner Zoo. The three cable car stations will enable a barrier-free and comprehensive access and transportation concept with corresponding access and extit routes. MOJA Design (design agency from Stuttgart, Germany) is responsible for planning aspects of the planned cable car system, including architectural design, passenger flow planning and project visualizations.

A 700-meter-long suspension bridge is to be built from the Königshöhe to the Kaiserhöhe.

In addition to the three core areas, there will be further projects and areas within the city:

- Various co-areas are intended to ensure the long-term development of the city beyond the Federal Horticultural Show and are scheduled for completion by 2031.
- Through BUGA+, citizens, associations, and institutions can implement further measures, events, and temporary installations within the city. The main theme of the event will be the mobility transition.

== Financing ==
The investment and implementation costs are expected to amount to approximately €73 million. After deducting potential subsidies and projected ticket sales revenue, the City of Wuppertal's share is expected to be approximately €20 million.

The visitor forecast developed as part of the feasibility study anticipates between 1.8 and 2.4 million visitors.

== Future ==
The grounds and infrastructure of the Federal Horticultural Show 2031 are intended to be preserved even after its conclusion and serve as a catalyst for long-term, sustainable urban development. In particular, the western part of the city is to become more attractive through the development of new recreational areas, also in the context of the new residential quarter in the core Tesche area. Furthermore, Wuppertal Zoo is to be renovated and expanded, new cycle paths will be built, and a new north–south connection across the valley axis will be created with the suspension bridge. As an important public transport hub during the Federal Horticultural Show, Wuppertal-Vohwinkel station is also to be modernized.
