= Wuppertal Zoologischer Garten station =

Railway station in Wuppertal, Germany

Wuppertal Zoologischer Garten
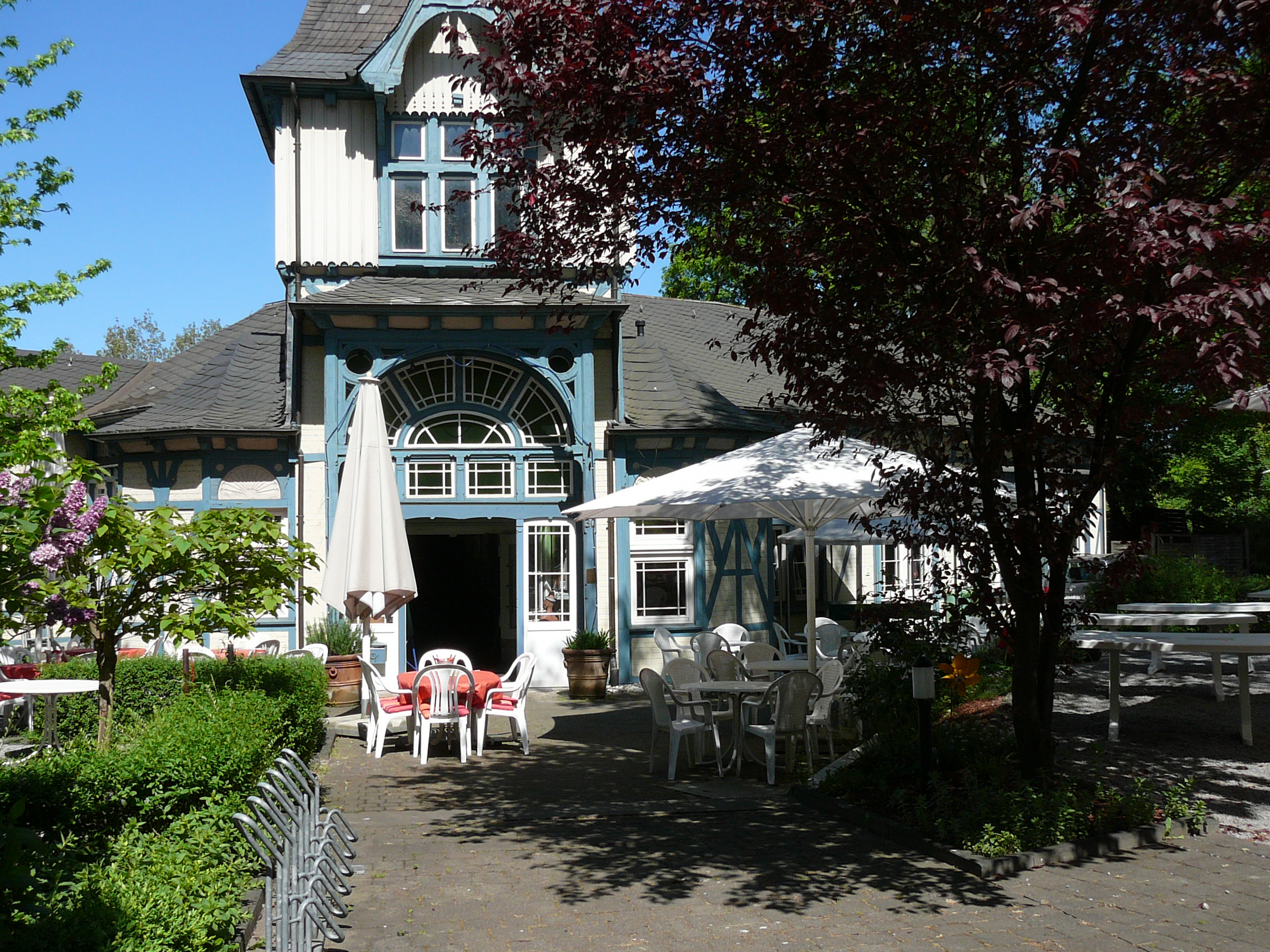

General information
- Location: Siegfriedstr. 30, Wuppertal Zoologischer Garten, Wuppertal, NRW; Germany
- Coordinates: 51°14′36″N 7°06′24″E
- Lines: Düsseldorf–Elberfeld (KBS 450.8)
- Platforms: 2

Construction
- Accessible: Yes

Other information
- Station code: 6915
- DS100 code: KWZ
- IBNR: 8006623
- Category: 4
- Fare zone: VRR: 650 and 656; VRS: 1650 (VRR transitional zone)
- Website: www.bahnhof.de

History
- Opened: 1880/97

Services
| Preceding station | Rhine-Ruhr S-Bahn | Following station |
|---|---|---|
| Wuppertal-Sonnborn towards Mönchengladbach Hbf | S8 | Wuppertal-Steinbeck towards Hagen Hbf |
| Wuppertal-Sonnborn towards Haltern am See or Recklinghausen Hbf | S9 | Wuppertal-Steinbeck towards Hagen Hbf |
| Wuppertal-Vohwinkel towards Kaarster See | S28 | Wuppertal-Steinbeck towards Wuppertal Hbf |
Location

Wuppertal Zoologischer Garten station (locally also called Zoo station) is a station on the Düsseldorf–Elberfeld railway in the city of Wuppertal in the German state of North Rhine-Westphalia. The station building was heritage-listed on 31 August 1987. It is classified by Deutsche Bahn as a category 4 station.

== The station building ==
Wuppertal Zoo was opened in western Wuppertal in 1881, in the Zooviertel ("zoo quarter"). The station was constructed after the takeover of the Düsseldorf–Elberfeld line by the Prussian state railways, on 1 January 1882, following the nationalisation of the Bergisch-Markisch Railway Company. The dating of the start of construction is difficult; it was dedicated in 1898, but the building is already visible in a photograph from 1892, and some sources say construction began in 1886. The entrance to the building is on Siegfriedstrasse and it is connected by a straight connecting street, Walkürenallee, which provides a vista to the Zoo entrance on Hubertusallee.

It is a single-storey timber-framed building, covered with a protruding hip roof. A striking feature is the prefabricated two-storey entrance tower, which has a steep hip roof. The tower has a balcony-like gable dormer and it is perforated with a round arch.

The station building is now used as a restaurant.

== Rail services ==
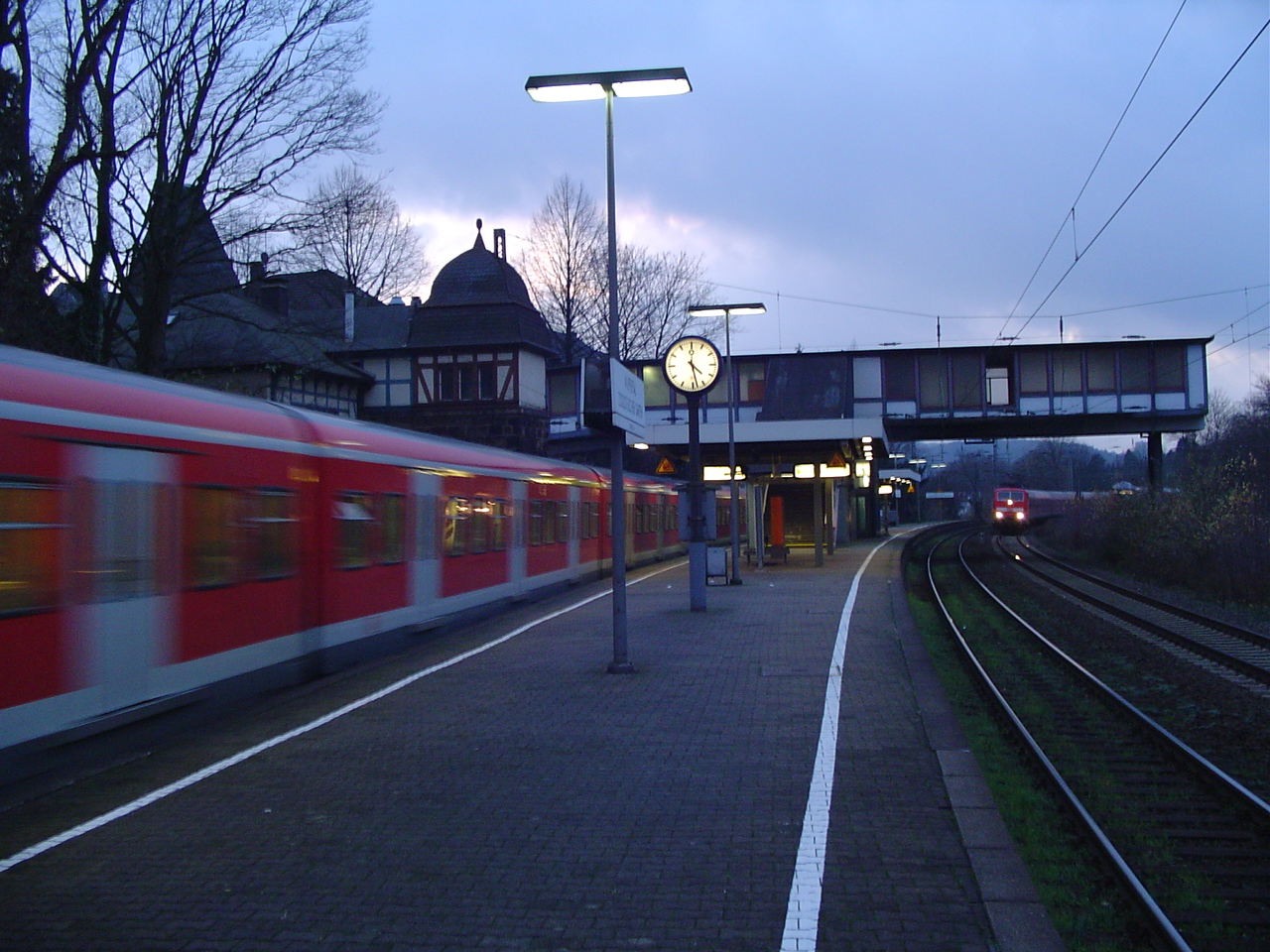
Platforms

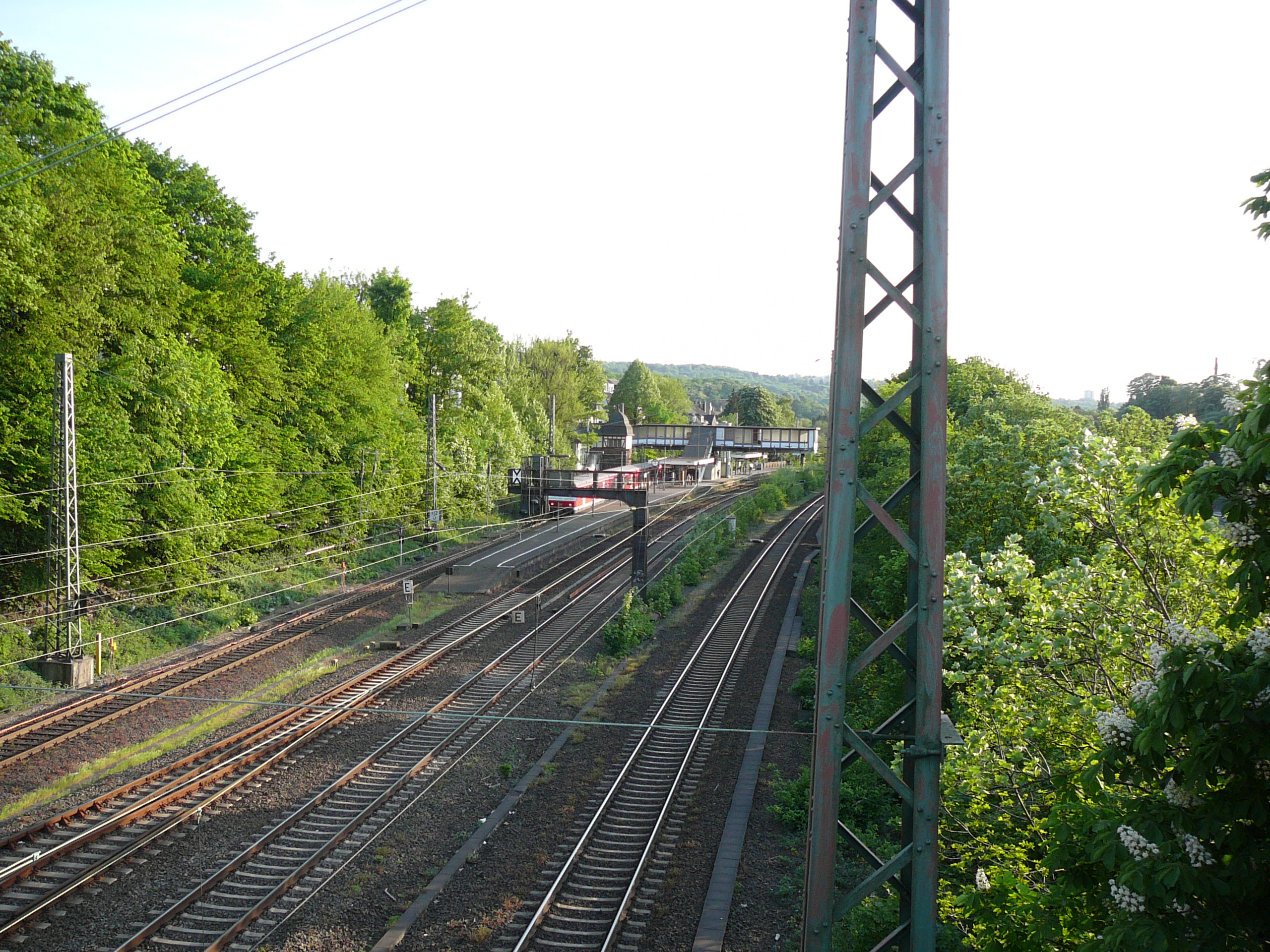
Station

Since the establishment of line S8 of the Rhine-Ruhr S-Bahn on 29 May 1988, the station is no longer used for long-distance traffic and it is now only served by S-Bahn trains. It is served by line S8 running between Mönchengladbach Hauptbahnhof and Hagen Hauptbahnhof every 20 minutes (two out of three starting/ending at Wuppertal-Oberbarmen), by line S9 running between Gladbeck and Wuppertal Hbf every 30 minutes and to Recklinghausen / Haltern am See and to Hagen every 60 minutes, and by the S28 service operating two times an hour to Wuppertal Hbf and to Kaarster See via Mettmann.

The station is also served by bus route 639, operated every 60 minutes by WSW mobil.

The remains of the former access to the long distance platform can still be seen today between the two middle tracks on the northern side of the pedestrian bridge. The platform itself has been completely removed, however, although the mainline tracks are still in the same position, so that in the area between the tracks at the station is much greater than usual.

The S-Bahn station is about 500m from two stations on the Wuppertal Suspension Railway: Zoo/Stadion and Varresbecker Straße.
