= Trams in Wuppertal =

Wuppertal tramway network
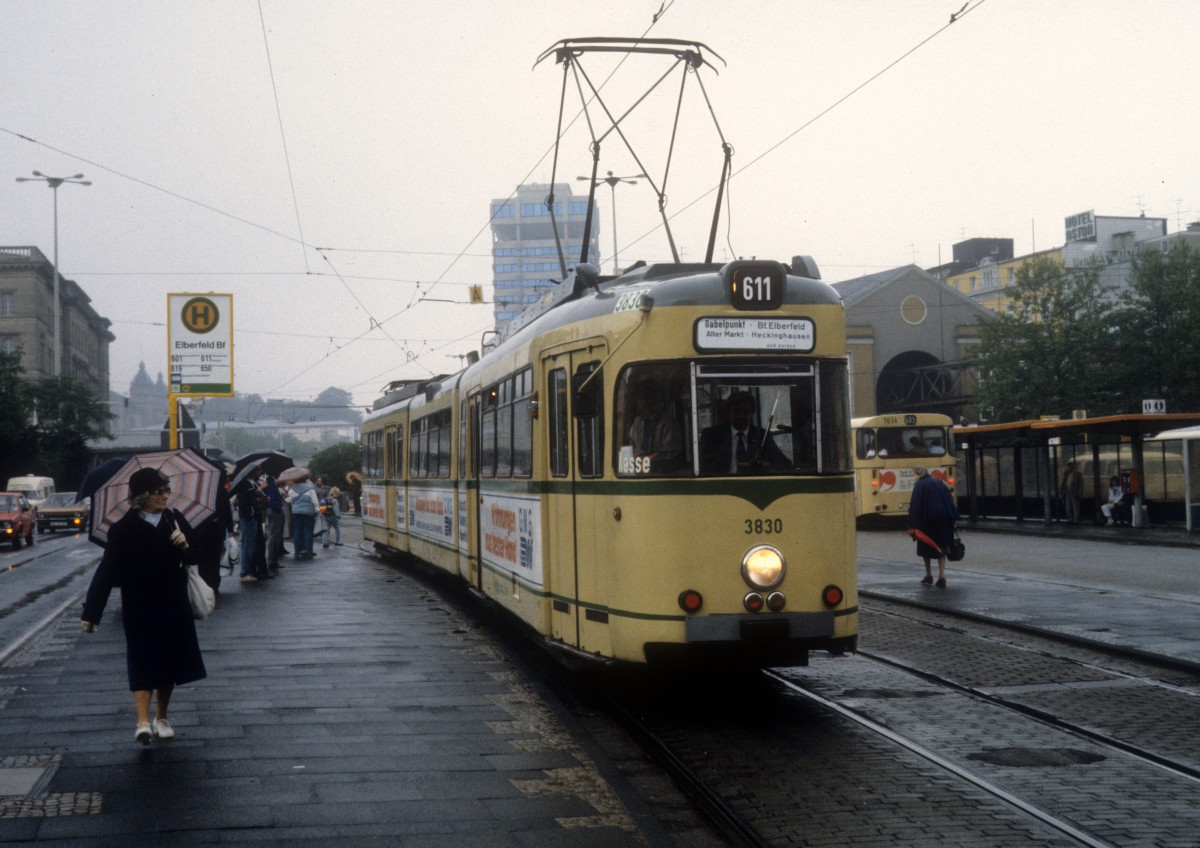
- A Wuppertal tram in 1987

Operation
- Locale: Wuppertal, Germany
- Open: 1873
- Close: 1987
- Operator(s): Wuppertaler Stadtwerke AG

Infrastructure
- Track gauge: 1,435 mm (4 ft 8 1/2 in) standard gauge

Statistics
- Route length: 1948: 175 km (109 mi)

The Wuppertal tramway network served Wuppertal, Germany for 114 years until its closure in 1987.

== History ==
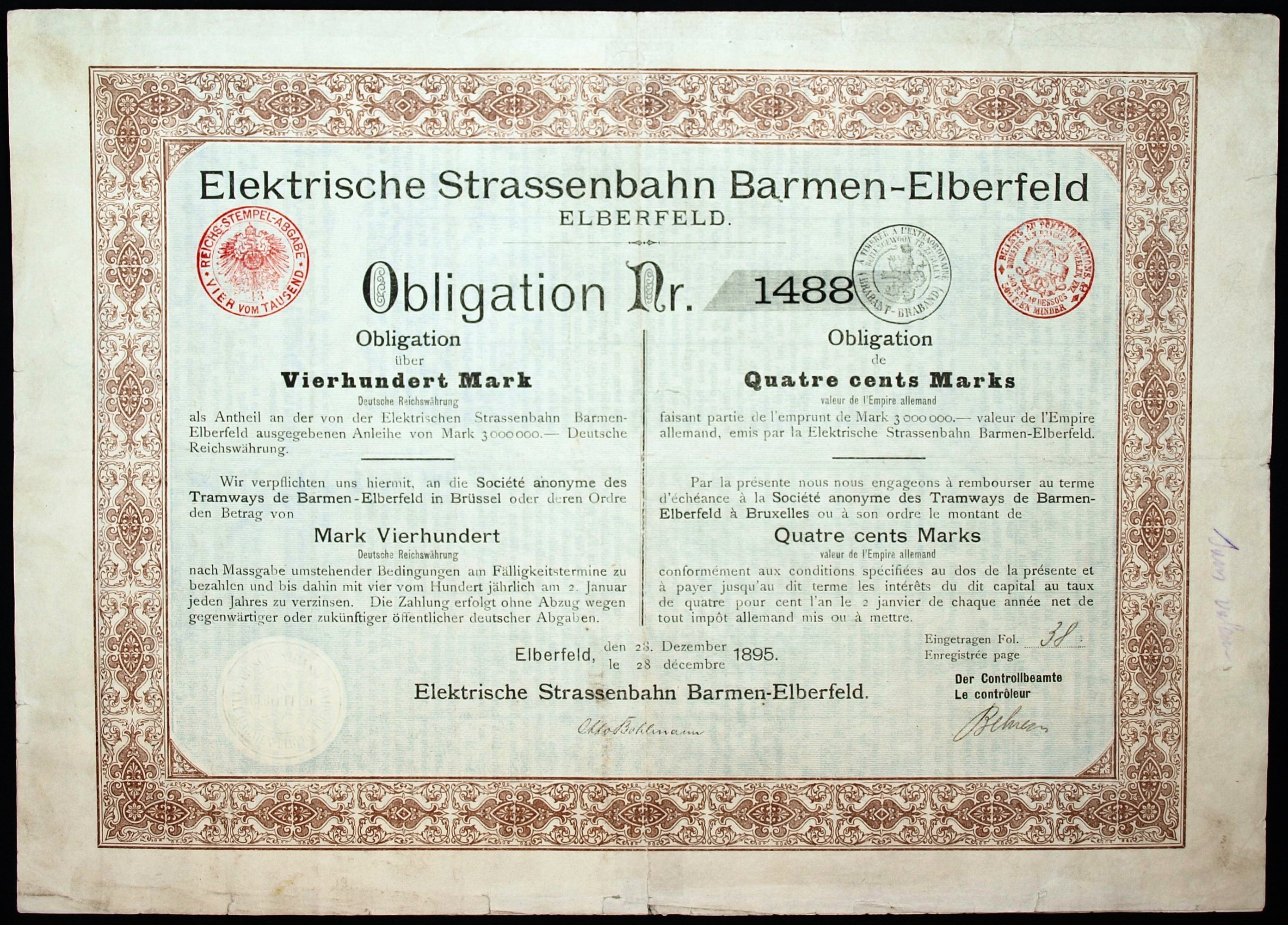
Debenture of the Elektrische Strassenbahn Barmen-Elberfeld, issued 28 December 1895

The first horse-drawn tram line opened between what were then the twin cities of Barmen and Elberfeld in 1873. The network was expanded and electrified with overhead wires starting in 1896. The tram network was operated by a number of companies and starting in 1901 had to compete with the Wuppertal Suspension Railway for passengers travelling east-west through the region. In 1925 Barmen and Elberfeld merged to form the city of Wuppertal and in 1940 the numerous tram operators were consolidated into a single system. By 1948, Wuppertal's tram network was the 6th most extensive in all of Germany and had a total route length of 175 km (109 mi).

After the introduction of public buses, tram lines in Wuppertal were gradually discontinued until the entire system was closed on 30 May 1987.

== Routes ==
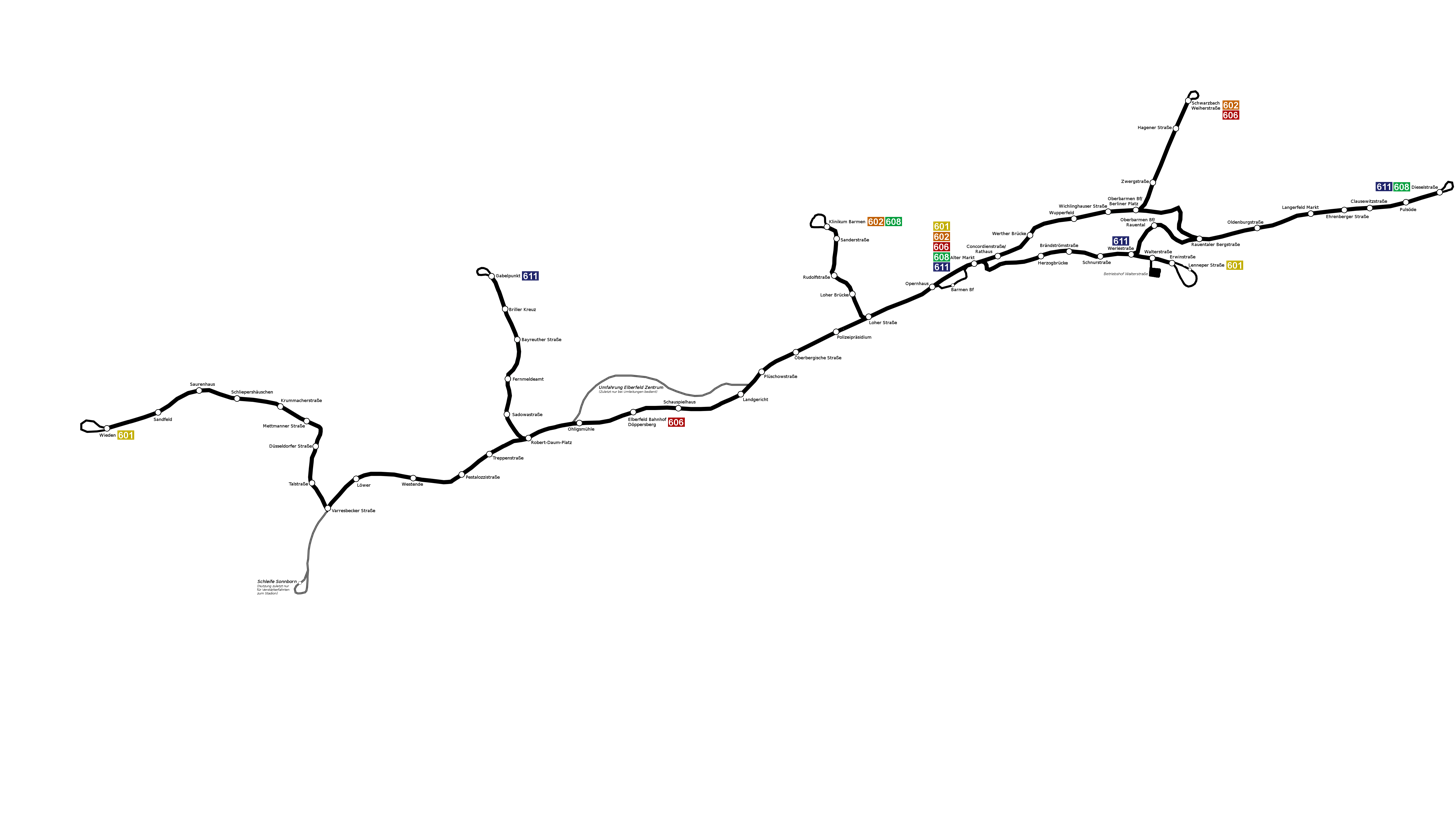
Map of the Wuppertal tramway network in 1980

In its last decade in operation, the Wuppertal tram network consisted of 5 tram lines as outlined below.

Line	Route	Length
601	Wieden – Lenneper Straße	15.3 km (9.5 mi)
602	Barmen Clinic – Weiherstrasse	5.9 km (3.7 mi)
606	Elberfeld Railway Station – Weiherstrasse	7.0 km (4.3 mi)
608	Barmen Clinic – Dieselstraße	8.1 km (5.0 mi)
611	Gabelpunkt – Dieselstraße	13.6 km (8.5 mi)
