= Wuppertal-Barmen station =

Railway station in Wuppertal, Germany

Wuppertal Barmen
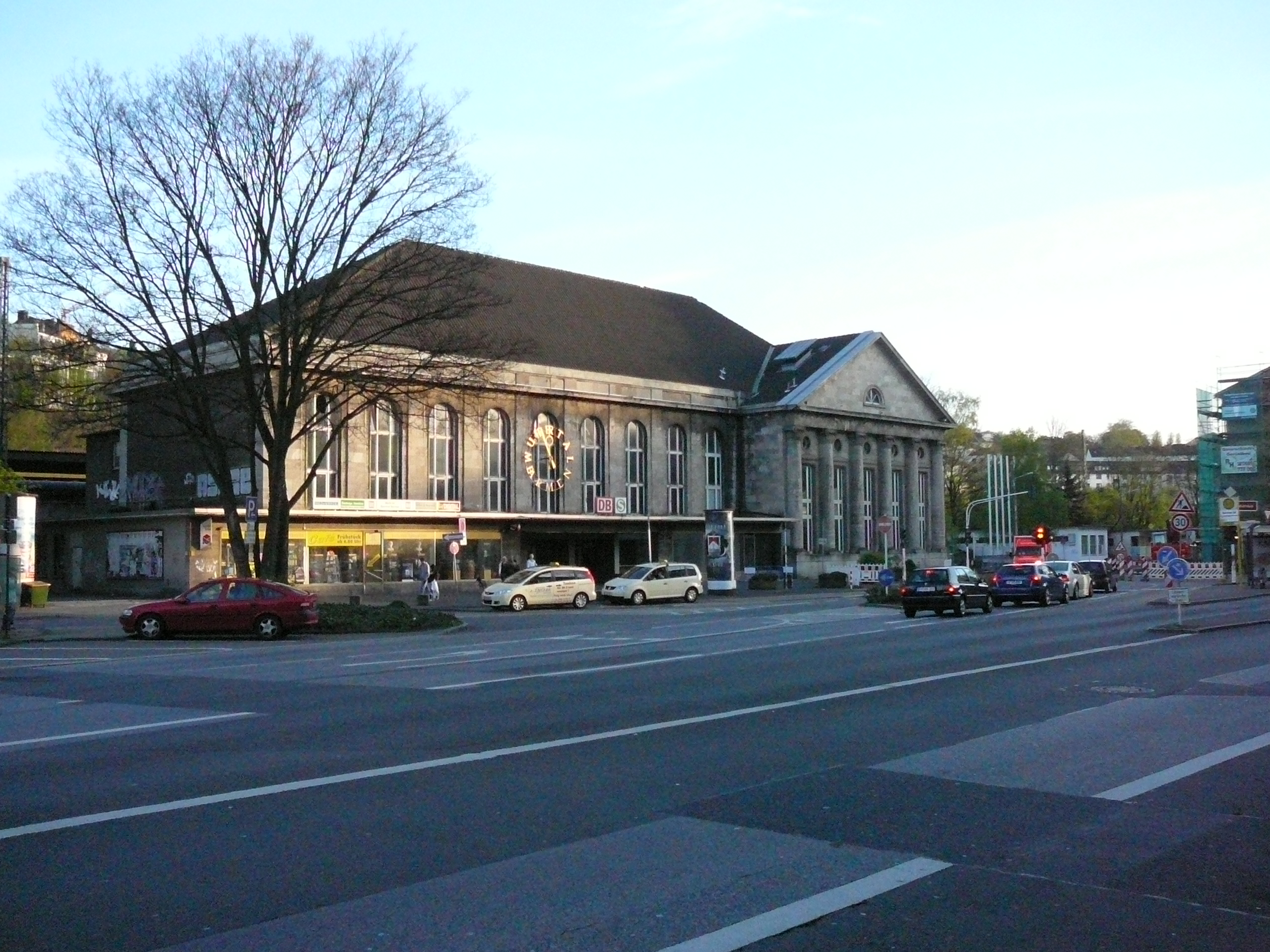
- Entrance building

General information
- Location: Winklerstr. 2, Barmen, NRW; Germany
- Coordinates: 51°16′2″N 7°11′40″E
- Owner: DB Netz
- Operator: DB Station&Service
- Line: Elberfeld–Dortmund
- Platforms: 2 island platforms
- Tracks: 4
- Train operators: Abellio Rail NRW; DB Regio NRW; Eurobahn; National Express Germany

Construction
- Accessible: Platforms 3, 4 only

Other information
- Station code: 6916
- DS100 code: KWBA
- IBNR: 8006596
- Category: 3
- Fare zone: VRR: 660; VRS: 1660 (VRR transitional zone)
- Website: www.bahnhof.de

History
- Opened: Original: 1847; Current: 1913
- Former names: Barmen Hauptbahnhof

Services
Preceding station		Following station
Wuppertal Hbf towards Venlo	RE 13	Wuppertal-Oberbarmen towards Hamm (Westf) Hbf
Preceding station	National Express Germany	Following station
Wuppertal Hbf towards Aachen Hbf	RE 4 (Wupper-Express)	Wuppertal-Oberbarmen towards Dortmund Hbf
Wuppertal Hbf towards Bonn-Mehlem	RB 48 (Rhein-Wupper-Bahn)	Wuppertal-Oberbarmen Terminus
Preceding station	Rhine-Ruhr S-Bahn	Following station
Wuppertal-Unterbarmen towards Wuppertal Hbf	S7	Wuppertal-Oberbarmen towards Solingen Hbf
Wuppertal-Unterbarmen towards Mönchengladbach Hbf	S8	Wuppertal-Oberbarmen towards Hagen Hbf
Wuppertal-Unterbarmen towards Haltern am See or Recklinghausen Hbf	S9	Wuppertal-Oberbarmen towards Hagen Hbf
Location
- Location within North Rhine-Westphalia

Wuppertal-Barmen station is a station in the city of Wuppertal in the German state of North Rhine-Westphalia on the Elberfeld–Dortmund railway. Its entrance building is protected as a monument. It was Barmen Hauptbahnhof before Barmen's incorporation in Wuppertal in 1929. Before the Second World War it was an important stop for express trains and had substantial freight traffic. Its importance declined after the war in favour of Oberbarmen and since the renaming of the Elberfeld station as Wuppertal Hauptbahnhof. The Opernhaus Wuppertal is nearby.

== Entrance Building ==
The building is a rectangular construction of Muschelkalk stone in neoclassical style, with pilasters and arched windows. Originally it had projecting wings at each end with Ionic columns, but since the war only the western one is preserved. This portal wing is topped by a flat triangular tympanum and has tall rectangular windows and oculi in the panels below the beams. In the tympanum there is a small semi-circular window. The central axis is adorned by a clock, with the letters of "Wuppertal-Barmen" replacing the numbers.

== History ==
The first station building was opened with the Elberfeld–Dortmund line as Barmen station by the Bergisch-Märkische Railway Company on 9 October 1847. In 1905 the station's name was changed to Barmen Hauptbahnhof. The first building, which was a little to the east of the current building was demolished.

=== Relocation and construction of the new station building ===
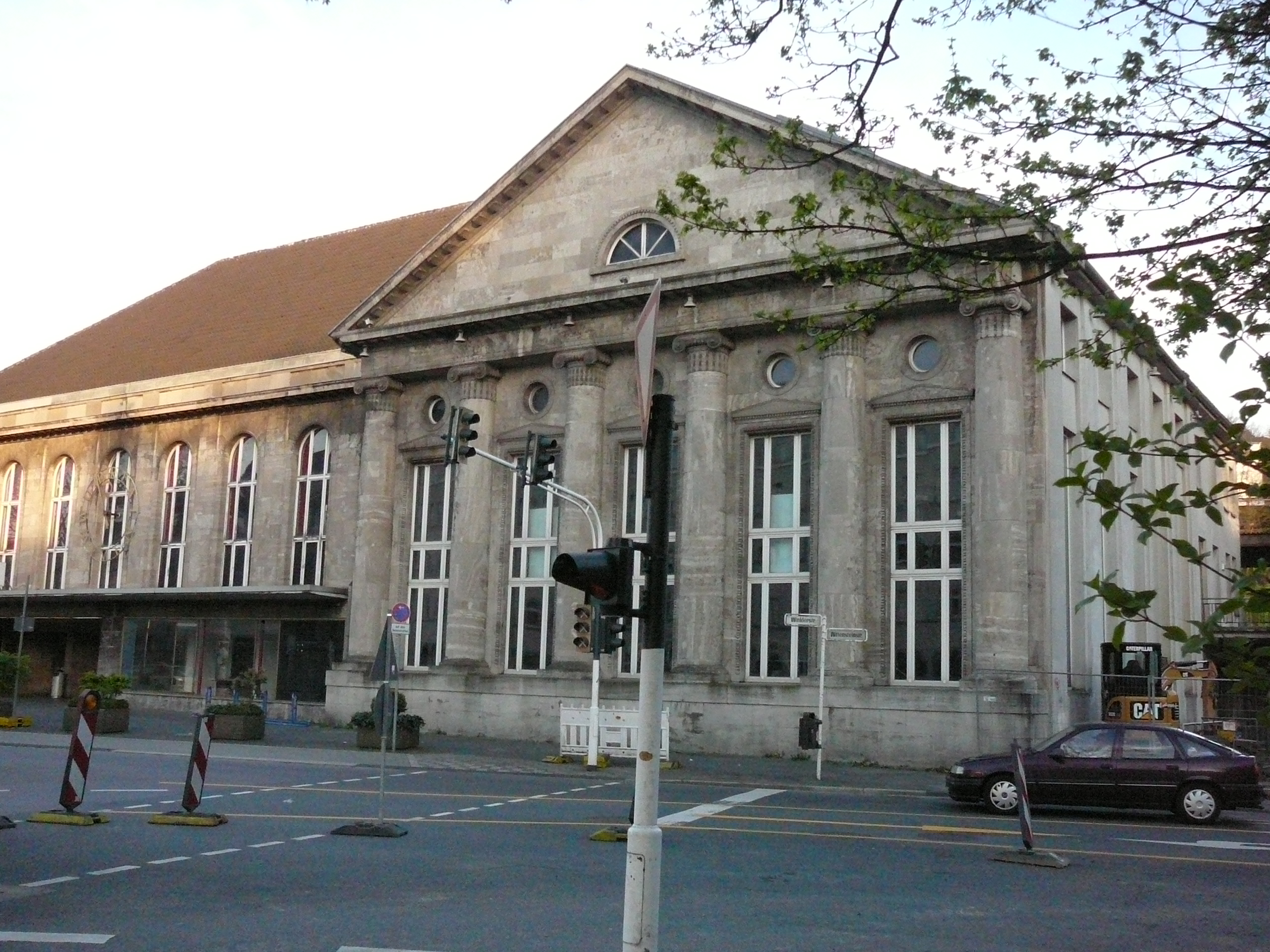
View from the west

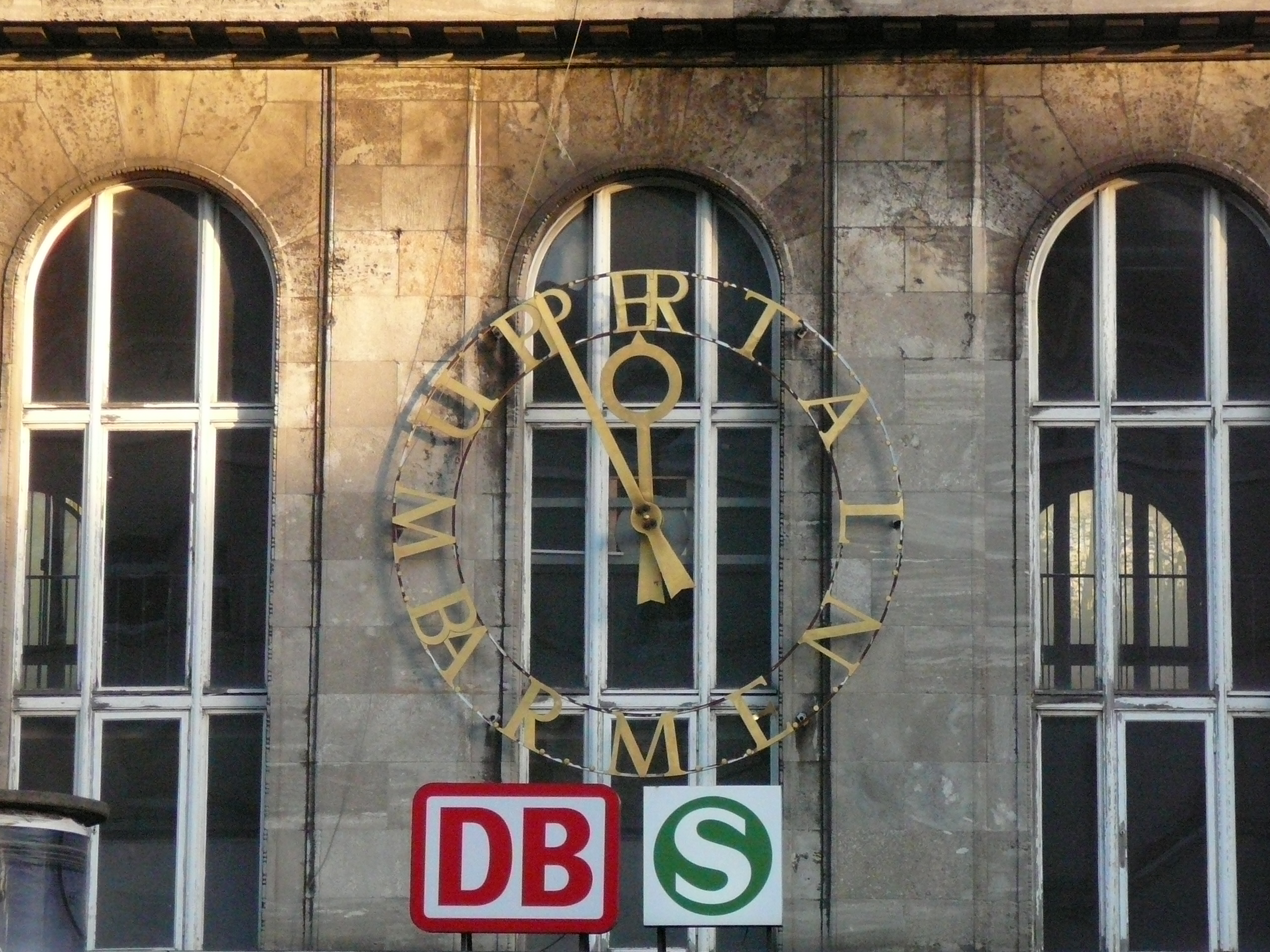
Station clock

Construction of the current, only partly preserved, station building at Winklerstraße started in October 1911 and it was opened for the public on 10 October 1913. The plans of the building were drafted by the Prussian architect Rüdell Alexander, who worked in a leading position in the railway department of the Prussian Ministry of Public Works. The construction was directed by the government architect, Johannes Ziertmann and Edward Behne of the railway division (German: Eisenbahndirektion) of Elberfeld. The building was badly damaged in the Second World War.

The station building became a listed building on 1 July 1988.

== Current operations ==
The station Wuppertal-Barmen is currently served by the following passenger services:

Line	Line name	Route
RE 4	Wupper-Express	Aachen – Mönchengladbach – Neuss – Düsseldorf – Wuppertal Hbf – Wuppertal-Barmen – Hagen – Dortmund
RE 13	Maas-Wupper-Express	Venlo – Viersen – Mönchengladbach – Neuss – Düsseldorf – Wuppertal Hbf – Wuppertal-Barmen – Hagen – Unna – Hamm (Westf)
RB 48	Rhein-Wupper-Bahn	Bonn-Mehlem – Bonn – Cologne – Solingen – Wuppertal-Vohwinkel – Wuppertal – Wuppertal-Barmen – Wuppertal-Oberbarmen
S7	Rhine-Ruhr S-Bahn	Wuppertal Hbf – Wuppertal-Barmen – Remscheid – Solingen
S8	Rhine-Ruhr S-Bahn	Mönchengladbach – Neuss – Düsseldorf – Wuppertal – Wuppertal-Barmen – Gevelsberg – Hagen
S9	Rhine-Ruhr S-Bahn	Recklinghausen - Gladbeck – Bottrop – Essen – Velbert-Langenberg – Wuppertal – Wuppertal-Barmen – Gevelsberg – Hagen
