= Wuppertal-Steinbeck station =

Railway station in Wuppertal, Germany

Wuppertal Steinbeck
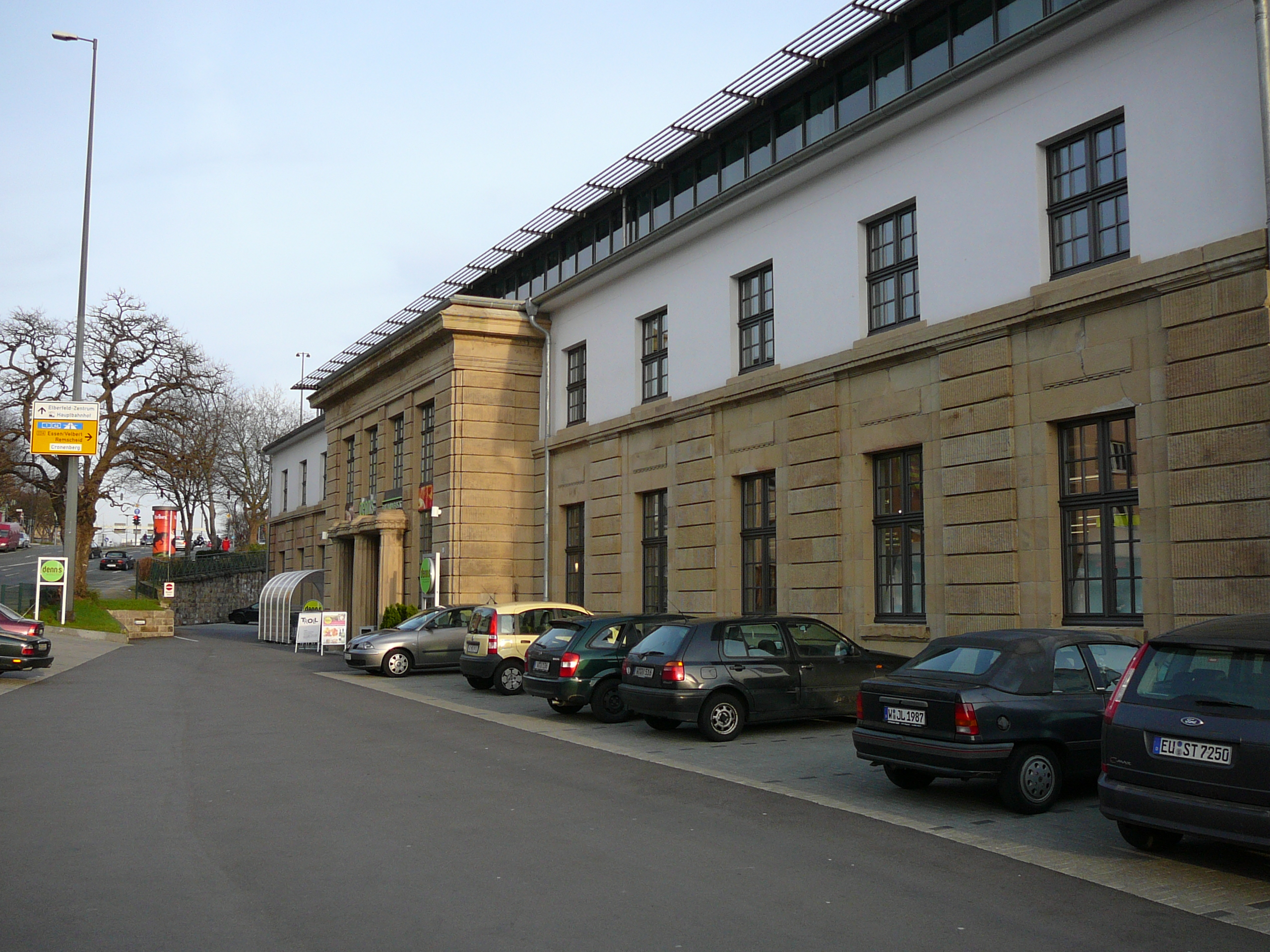
- Station entrance

General information
- Location: Hoefstr. 4, Wuppertal, NRW; Germany
- Coordinates: 51°15′03″N 7°08′27″E
- Lines: Düsseldorf–Elberfeld (KBS 450.8)
- Platforms: 2

Construction
- Accessible: No

Other information
- Station code: 6935
- DS100 code: KWS
- IBNR: 8006619
- Category: 5
- Fare zone: VRR: 650; VRS: 1650 (VRR transitional zone)
- Website: www.bahnhof.de

History
- Opened: 1841–1847; 1855/70

Services
Preceding station	Rhine-Ruhr S-Bahn	Following station
Wuppertal Zoologischer Garten towards Mönchengladbach Hbf	S8	Wuppertal Hbf towards Hagen Hbf
Wuppertal Zoologischer Garten towards Haltern am See or Recklinghausen Hbf	S9	Wuppertal Hbf towards Hagen Hbf
Wuppertal Zoologischer Garten towards Kaarster See	S28	Wuppertal Hbf Terminus
Location

Wuppertal-Steinbeck station is a station on the Düsseldorf–Elberfeld railway in the city of Wuppertal in the German state of North Rhine-Westphalia. The current station building was built in 1913 and it has been heritage-listed since 1991. It replaced an older station building that was built between 1860 and 1870. It is classified by Deutsche Bahn as a category 5 station.

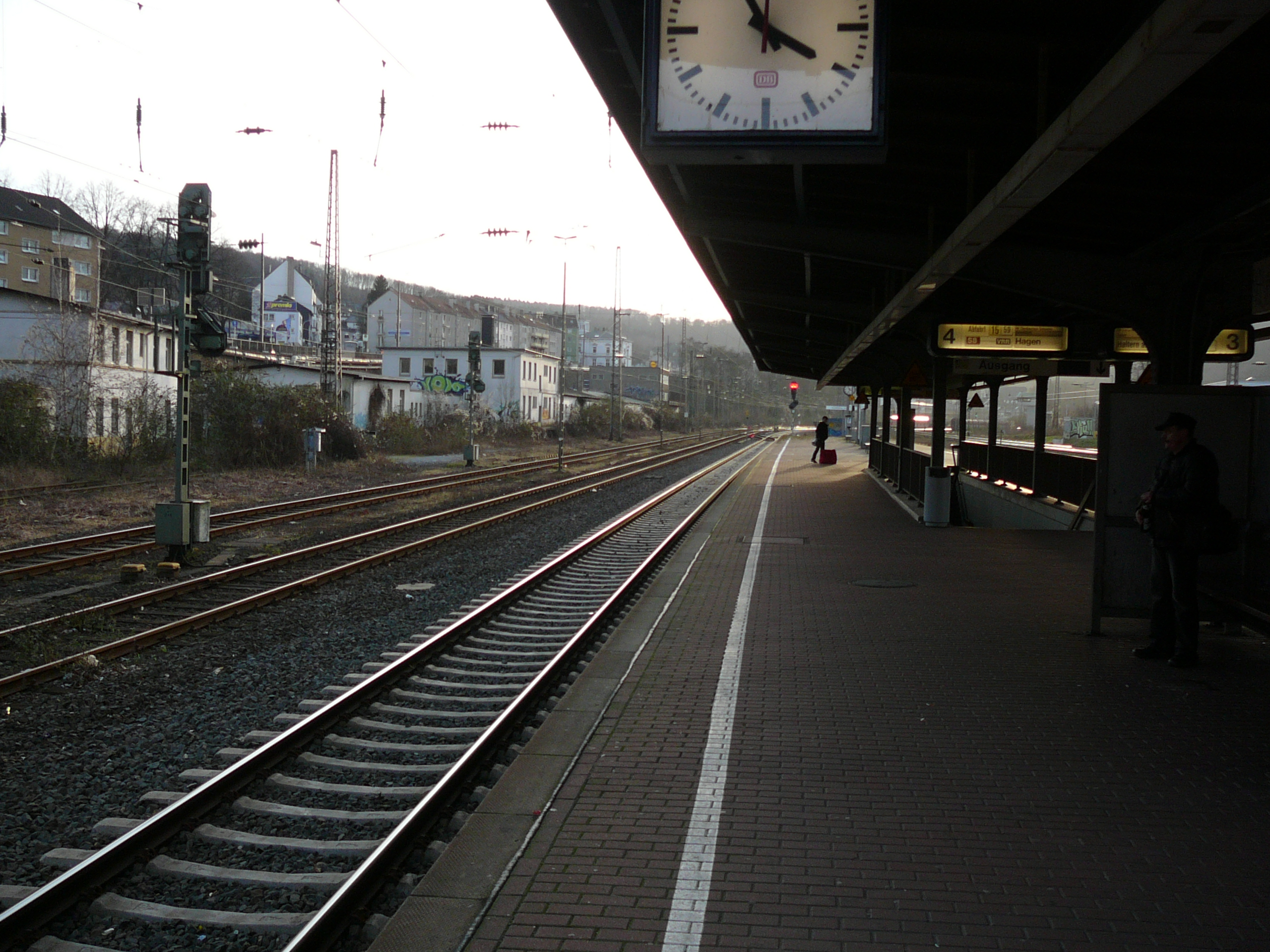
Platform

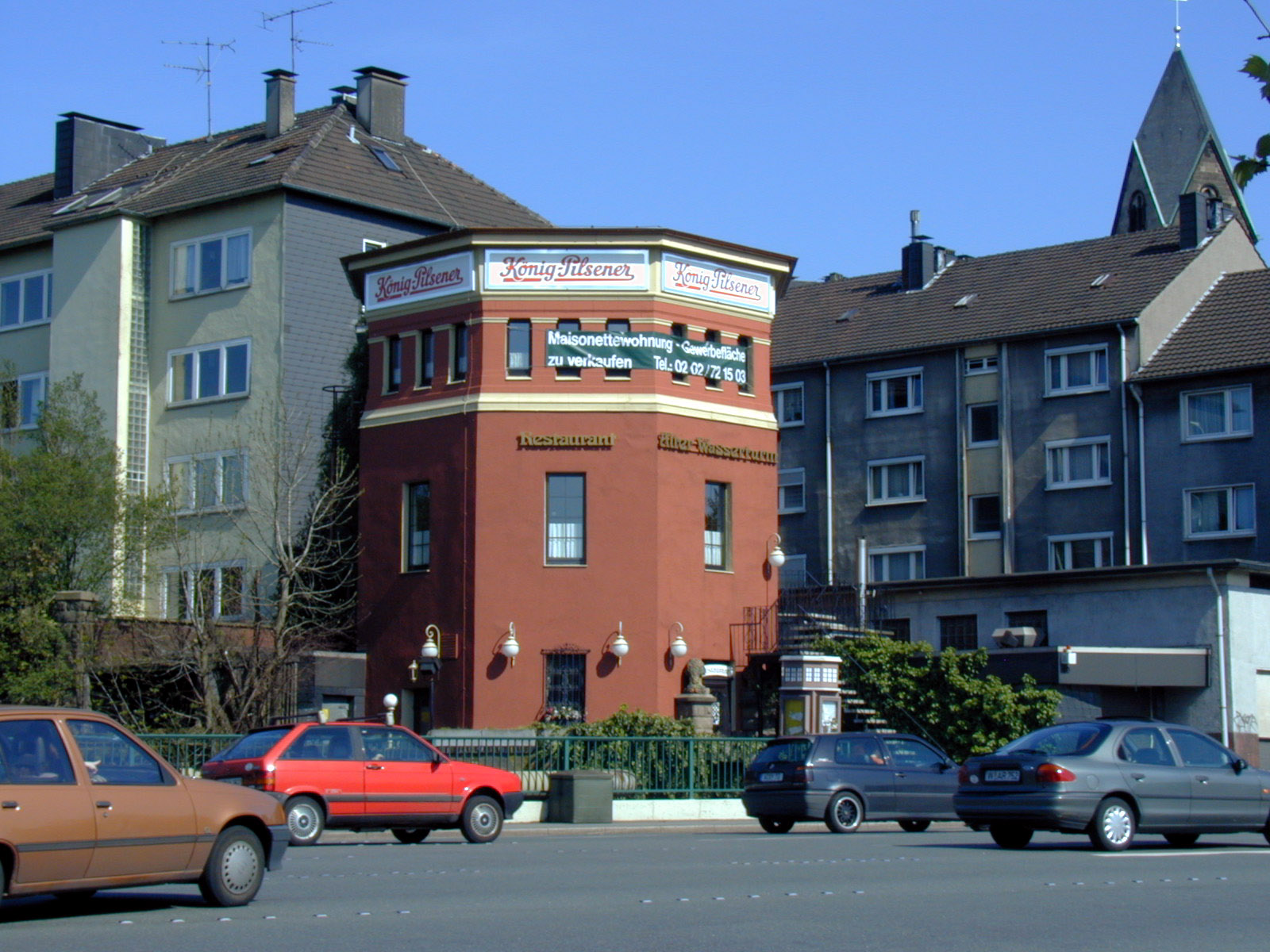
Former station watertower, now a restaurant

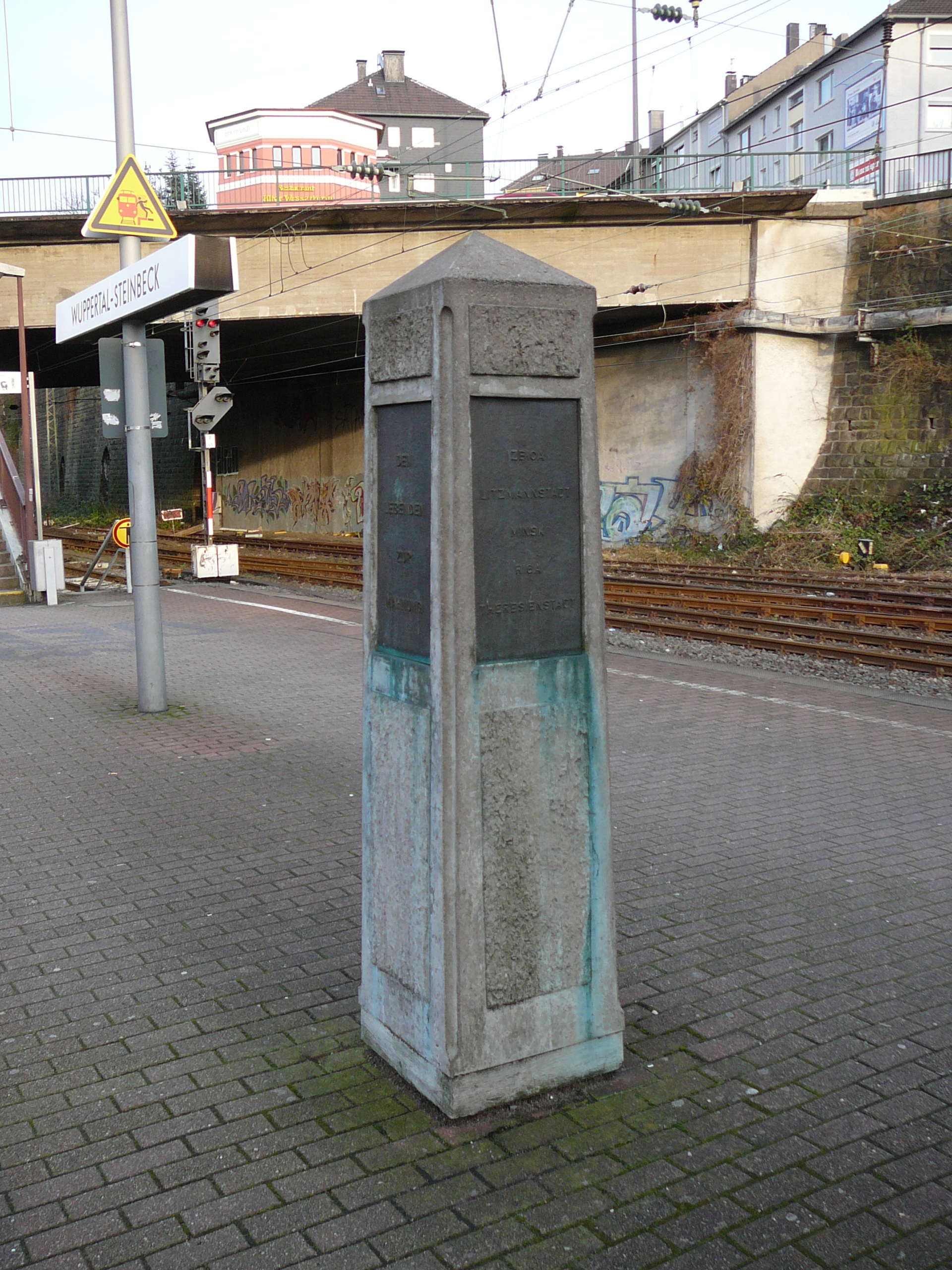
Obelisk commemorating the deportation of Wuppertal's Jews

== History ==
The Düsseldorf–Elberfeld line was opened in 1841 by the Düsseldorf-Elberfeld Railway Company and was one of the first railways in western Germany. In order to avoid a steep climb, the line ended before Döppers Berg (hill), about one kilometre from the centre of the town of Elberfeld (now central Wuppertal). Originally a little station building was built at the railhead.

A few years later, the Elberfeld–Dortmund railway of the Bergisch-Märkische Railway Company was built from Dortmund, which originally ended on the other side of the Döppers Berg. On 28 December 1848, a line was opened connecting the two lines together, making a continuous connection in the valley of the Wupper and changing Steinbeck into a through station. In 1849, Elberfeld station was opened and it became the most important passenger station in Elberfeld.

Between 1860 and 1870 a station building was built. At the same time an extensive area was developed for rail freight, including a marshalling yard, loading tracks and a locomotive depot with a turntable and a roundhouse because Elberfeld station had no room for such facilities.

Over the next few years Steinbeck station lost ground against the more centrally located Elberfeld station, which was only a kilometre away, and many of the inter-regional train services no longer stopped there. The construction of the Burgholz Railway in 1891 converted Steinbeck station into a junction station.

A water tower was built on the other side a bridge over the tracks next to the station, which is now called Südbrücke ("south bridge"). The water tower has recently been converted into a restaurant.

The redevelopment of the railway as a four-track line was completed in 1914. This was accompanied by a major redesign of the station area, including the replacement of the roundhouse by a rectangular building. Also, the old station building was replaced in 1913 by the current stately building. The turntable was dismantled in 1953 after the end of the stationing of steam locomotives in Steinbeck.

The darkest chapter in the history of the station occurred towards the end of the Nazi period: the deportation of over 1,000 Jewish citizens of Wuppertal via Eastern European ghettos to Nazi extermination camps took place from Steinbeck station. On the platform a labelled obelisk made of stone memorialises the five mass movements of deportees.

Air raids on Elberfeld severely damaged the entrance building. The hipped roof with a gable over the entrance to the circulation area and the central clock tower were not rebuilt.

In the 1980s the station was rebuilt for the S-Bahn network and the redevelopment further reduced the station's functions. The freight loading facilities and the freight terminal were abandoned completely. The extensive trackwork was mostly rebuilt as commercial sites and the Steinbecker Meile shopping centre.

In the second half of the 20th century quarterly shipments of conscripts of the district recruiting office in Wuppertal to places of military service began in Steinbeck. Also material used by troops stationed at Wuppertal barracks in the course of history, including units of the Wehrmacht, the British armed forces and the Bundeswehr was loaded and unloaded at Steinbeck.

At the beginning of the 21st century there was a proposal to develop the northern part of the station site under a project called Mediapark Wuppertal for companies in the media industry, but these plans were dropped in 2006. On 29 July 1991, the station building was heritage-listed as a monument. It was extensively renovated in 2007 and fitted with a redesigned roof. In addition an extensive organic supermarket now occupies the building.

== Rail services ==
After the optimisation of long-distance tracks in the late 20th century, including the replacement of the platform and the closure of the Burgholz line on 29 May 1988, only Rhine-Ruhr S-Bahn line S8 stopped at the station. Since 14 December 2003, the S-Bahn line S9 has also stopped at the station, from 13 December 2020, S28 started operating from the station. A staircase leads from the south bridge (Südbrücke) to the platform.

The station is served by served by line S 8 running between Mönchengladbach Hauptbahnhof and Hagen Hauptbahnhof every 20 mins (two out of three starting/ending at Wuppertal-Oberbarmen) and by line S 9 running between Gladbeck and Wuppertal Hbf every 30 minutes (from Gladbeck one train an hour each to Haltern am See and Recklinghausen Hbf; from Wuppertal one train an hour to Hagen Hbf), and by line S 28 two times an hour to Wuppertal Hbf and to Kaarster See via Mettmann.
