= Wuppertal-Unterbarmen station =

Railway station in Wuppertal, Germany

Wuppertal Unterbarmen
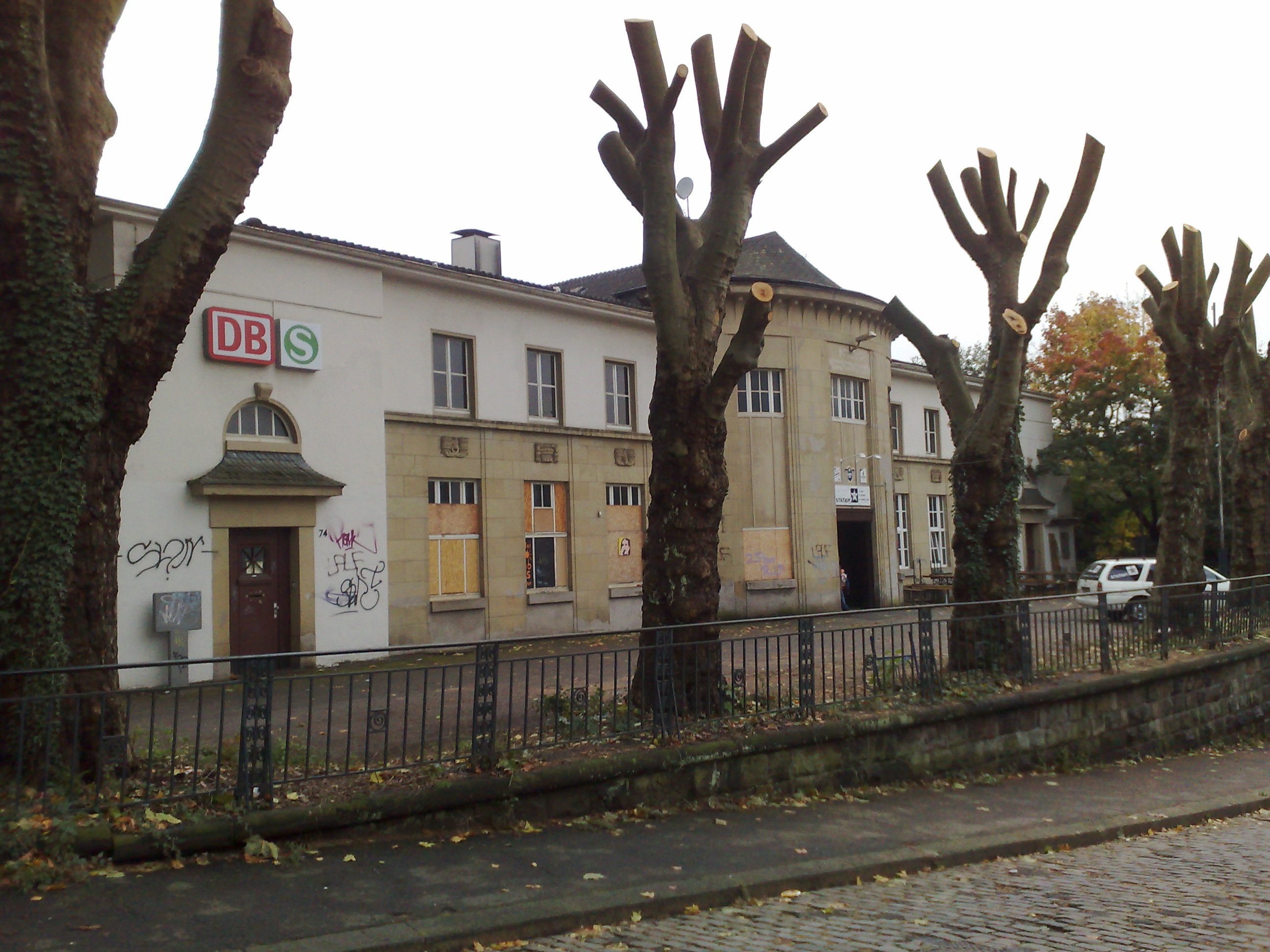
- Entrance building

General information
- Location: Elberfelderstr. 74, Wuppertal, NRW; Germany
- Coordinates: 51°15′32″N 7°10′16″E
- Owner: DB Netz
- Operator: DB Station&Service
- Lines: Elberfeld–Dortmund (KBS 458, KBS 450.8)
- Platforms: 1 island platform
- Tracks: 5
- Train operators: Abellio Rail NRW; DB Regio NRW

Construction
- Accessible: Yes

Other information
- Station code: 6936
- DS100 code: KWU
- IBNR: 8006620
- Category: 4
- Fare zone: VRR: 650 and 660; VRS: 1650 and 1660 (VRR transitional zone)
- Website: www.bahnhof.de

History
- Opened: 1880

Services
| Preceding station | Rhine-Ruhr S-Bahn | Following station |
|---|---|---|
| Wuppertal Hbf Terminus | S7 | Wuppertal-Barmen towards Solingen Hbf |
| Wuppertal Hbf towards Mönchengladbach Hbf | S8 | Wuppertal-Barmen towards Hagen Hbf |
| Wuppertal Hbf towards Haltern am See or Recklinghausen Hbf | S9 | Wuppertal-Barmen towards Hagen Hbf |
Location
- Location within North Rhine-Westphalia

Wuppertal-Unterbarmen station is located in the German city of Wuppertal in the German state of North Rhine-Westphalia. It is on the Düsseldorf–Elberfeld line and is classified by Deutsche Bahn as a category 4 station.

== History ==
No station was built at Unterbarmen, when the Bergisch-Märkische Railway Company, was opened its Elberfeld–Dortmund trunk line. It was opened in 1880 under the name of Unterbarmen BM. It was opened in the western part of the then independent city of Barmen. Somewhat later Unter-Barmen Rh station (later Wuppertal-Loh station) was opened on the competing line of the Rhenish Railway Company.

The station was designed as a through station with two long-distance and two local tracks. A fifth track provided a shuttle connection to Barmen station, which was used for shunting, without blocking the long-distance and local tracks. Near the station were the company of Rittershaus & Blecher GmbH (now Christian-Morgenstern-Schule) and the Wicküler Brewery. Thus, a large amount of freight was handled at the station.

In 1897, the station was renamed Barmen-Unterbarmen by Prussian state railways. It was renamed Unterbarmen in 1930 and Wuppertal-Unterbarmen in 1950. Two signal boxes were closed in 1978.

== Station ==
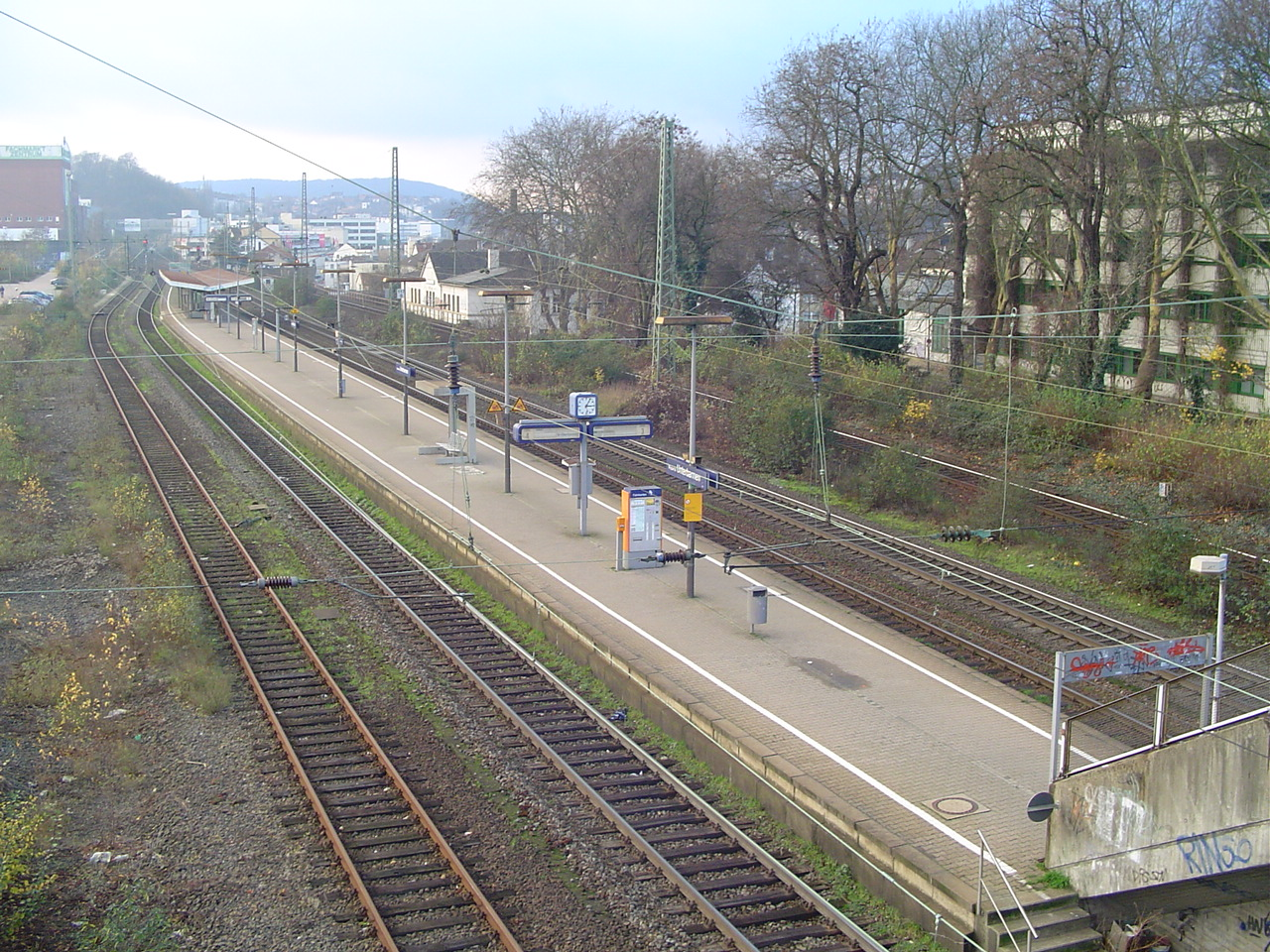
S-Bahn station

The entrance building, which is built on an embankment, now serves only as a western access to the platforms of the S-Bahn line. An eastern access to the platforms is located on a pedestrian overpass over railway tracks. Two park-and-ride parking lots are located at the station, the biggest to the southwest of the platform. Barrier-free access to the platform for the disabled is only available from the smaller car park at the entrance building. The station is currently classified as a category 4 station.

Access for long distance trains to the platforms and the platforms themselves have been dismantled, but the mainline tracks are still in the same position, so that the area between the tracks at the station is much greater than usual.

== Rail services ==
The station is served by S 8 services between Mönchengladbach Hauptbahnhof and Hagen Hauptbahnhof (two out of three each hour terminating at Wuppertal-Oberbarmen). It is also served by line S 9 running from Recklinghausen to Hagen Hauptbahnhof. It is also served by line S 7 service Der Müngstener to Solingen Hbf.

It is also served by bus route CE61, operated by WSW mobil at 20-minute intervals during the day.
