= Wuppertal Zoo =

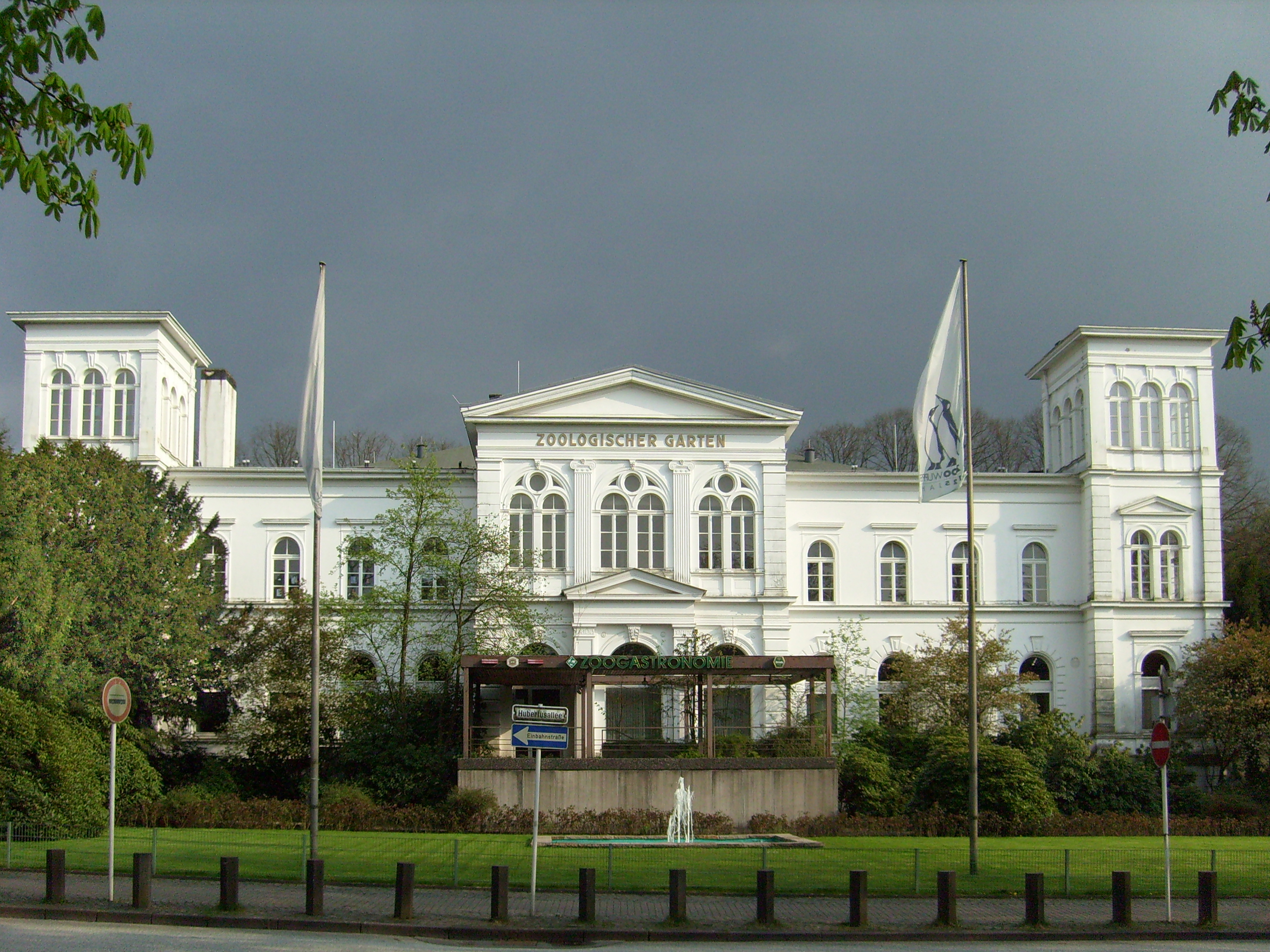
- Former entrance, now restaurant and event venue
- Interactive map of Wuppertal Zoo
- 51°14′23″N 7°06′44″E
- Date opened: 8 September 1881
- Location: Wuppertal, Germany
- Land area: 24 ha (59 acres)
- No. of animals: 5,000
- No. of species: 500
- Website: www.zoo-wuppertal.de/index.php?id=73&L=2

Wuppertal Zoo (German: Zoologischer Garten Wuppertal or Zoo Wuppertal) is a 24-hectare (59-acre) zoo in Wuppertal, Germany. About 5,000 animals from around the world live at the zoo, representing about 500 species, including apes, monkeys, bears, big cats, elephants, as well as birds, reptiles, and fish.

== History ==
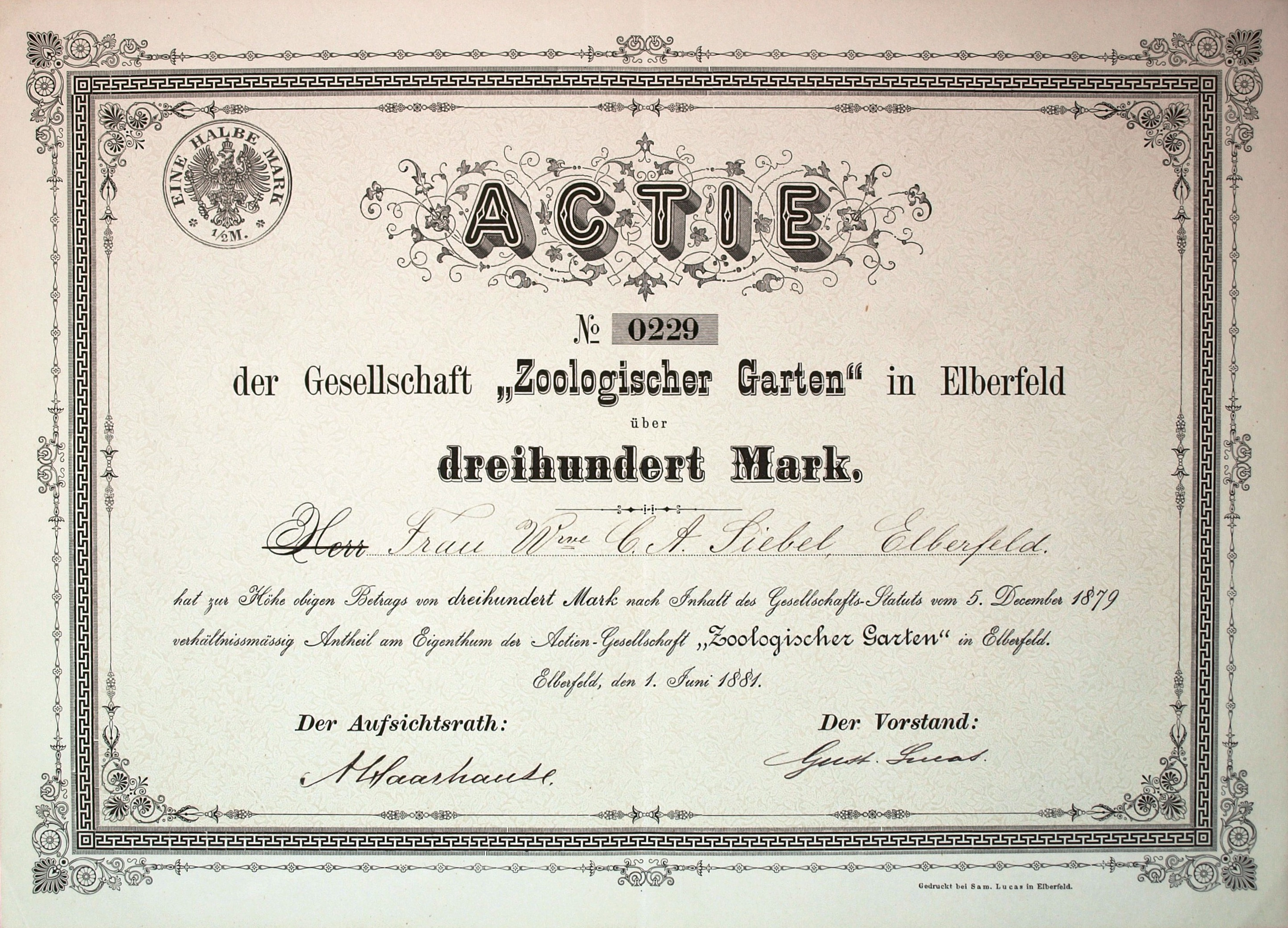
Share of the Actien-Gesellschaft "Zoologischer Garten" in Elberfeld, issued 1. June 1881

The zoo was founded on 5 December 1879 by a joint-stock company, Gesellschaft Zoologischer Garten. The central building opened on 8 September 1881, together with the zoo itself. It featured 34 animals, among them a pair of wolves and a bear. Since then, the zoo has been steadily expanded.

In 1937, the joint-stock company which owned the zoo struggled due to economic hardships, and operations were transferred to the Wuppertal city council, which has run the zoo since then.

During World War II, Zoo Wuppertal was not as badly damaged as other German zoos. At that time, a majority of the animals were evacuated to the Berlin and Poznan zoos and did not return.

In 1946, the Zoo Banqueting Hall hosted British war crimes trials which especially concerned the individuals brought to the dock by the Special Air Service War Crimes Investigation Team. Major Alastair Hunt was responsible for trying several Nazi war criminals, notably Gestapo and SS Commander Standartenfuhrer Erich Isselhorst and SS-Hauptsturmführer Fritz Hartjenstein.

The late 20th century and early 21st century saw major upgrades and renovations to the exhibits in the zoo. A new large-cat building was constructed in 1970 to replace the old lion house and moated lion enclosure, followed by a renovated aquarium in 1974, an ape pavilion in 1978, a renovated primate house in 1985 and, in 1993, an aviary for South American birds, which was added to the bird building constructed in 1960.

In 1995, a new elephant house was constructed, with a 1.2-hectare (3-acre) outdoor yard and 1,000-square-metre (10,750 sq ft) indoor quarters, giving the zoo's herd of elephants expanded room.

The gorilla enclosure was updated and expanded to 525 square metres (5,650 sq ft) in 2006, coinciding with the 125th anniversary of the opening of the zoo. Visitors can view the gorillas through a large glass window. The drill monkey enclosure was also renovated in 2006.

On 24 May 2007, the zoo opened a new enclosure for lions and tigers. The 1-hectare (2.5-acre) lion enclosure is claimed to be the largest in a German zoo, and the Siberian tigers now live in several enclosures in the Valley of Tigers.

Anori, a polar bear cub born on 4 January 2012, which shares a father with the internationally well-known late polar bear Knut, made her public debut alongside her mother, Vilma, on Thursday, 29 March 2012. Until then, a camera inside their enclosure had been monitoring her progress in learning to walk and get around.

== Animals & Exhibits ==
The zoo's rocky and hilly terrain, as well as the city's humid and rainy climate, has led it to specialize in animals native to alpine tundra, temperate deciduous forests, and tropical rainforests.

Modern enclosures and zoo buildings exist for elephants and apes, and there is a house for birds with a specially designed hall, where free-flying birds can be observed, as well as small combined aquarium/terrarium.

== Location ==
The zoo lies in the western part of Wuppertal, on the so-called "Boltenberg", between Elberfeld and Vohwinkel.

Public transport is available in the immediate vicinity. The Wuppertaler Schwebebahn (Wuppertal Suspension Railway), and Wuppertal Zoologischer Garten station on the Rhine-Ruhr S-Bahn (S8, S9), are close by. Travelling car, via Autobahn 46, is possible but not recommended, since parking spaces are in very short supply.

== Directors ==
- 1900–1934: Josef Keusch
- 1934–1941: Wilhelm Seiffge
- 1942–1947: Eduard Wiedmann
- 1947–1950: Martin Schlott
- 1950–1967: Richard Müller
- 1967–1988: Gerhard Haas
- 1988–present: Ulrich Schürer
