= Wuppertal Hauptbahnhof =

Railway station in Wuppertal, Germany

Wuppertal Hbf
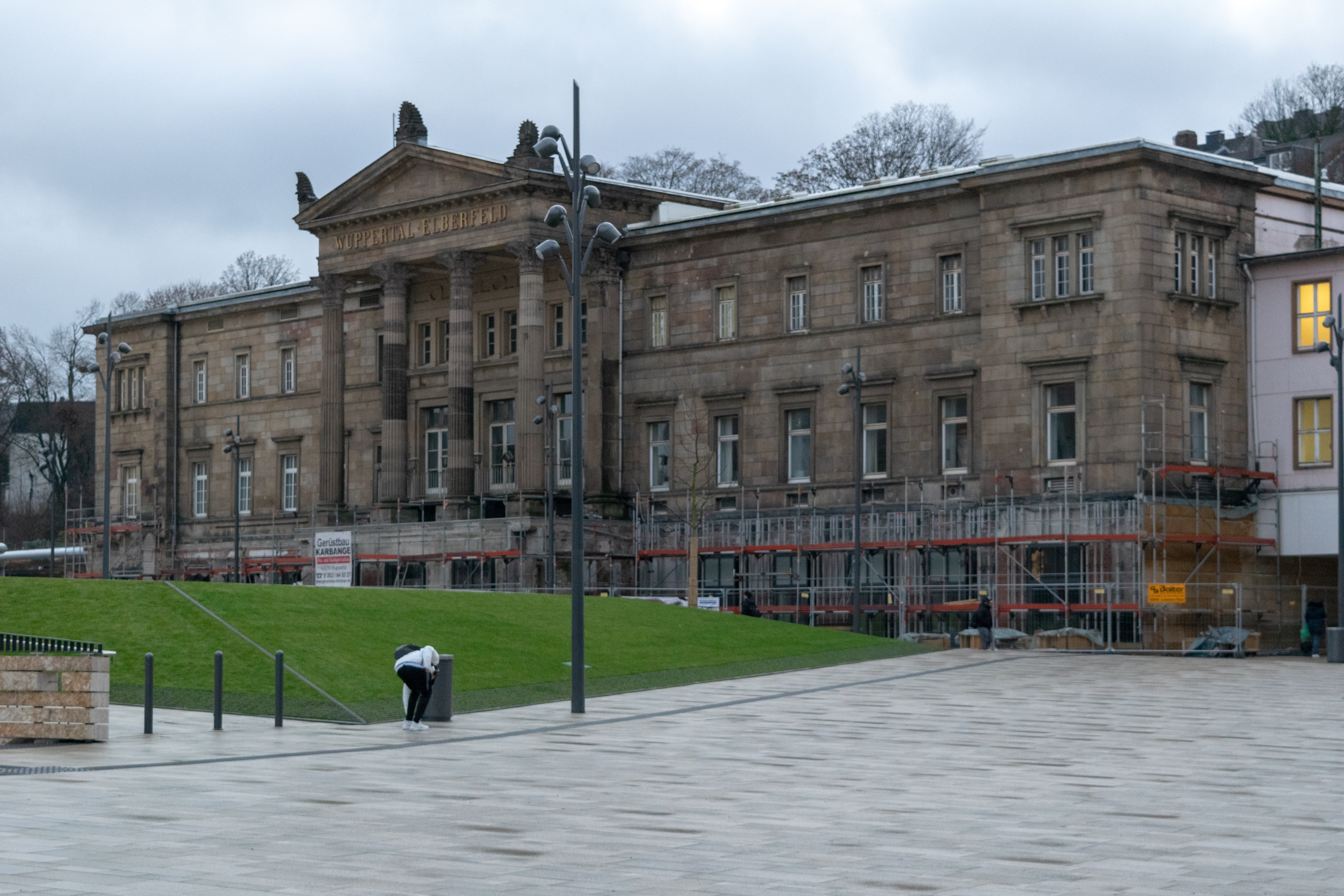
- Station building in 2018

General information
- Location: Döppersberg 37, Wuppertal, North Rhine-Westphalia; Germany
- Coordinates: 51°15′17″N 7°9′0″E
- Owner: DB Netz
- Operator: DB Station&Service
- Lines: Düsseldorf–Wuppertal; Wuppertal–Dortmund; (Wuppertal–)Gruiten–Köln-Deutz; (Wuppertal–)Wuppertal-Oberbarmen–Solingen; (Wuppertal–)Wuppertal-Vohwinkel–Essen
- Platforms: 2 island platforms 1 side platform
- Tracks: 5
- Train operators: DB Fernverkehr; DB Regio NRW; Eurobahn; National Express Germany

Construction
- Accessible: Yes
- Architect: Hauptner and Ebeling
- Architectural style: Neoclassical

Other information
- Station code: 6914
- DS100 code: KW
- IBNR: 8000266
- Category: 2
- Fare zone: VRR: 650; VRS: 1650 (VRR transitional zone)
- Website: www.bahnhof.de

History
- Opened: 1850
Services
Preceding station	DB Fernverkehr	Following station
Solingen Hbf towards Köln Hbf	ICE 10	Hagen Hbf towards Berlin Ostbahnhof
Köln Hbf towards Koblenz Hbf	ICE 19	Hagen Hbf towards Berlin Ostbahnhof
Solingen Hbf towards München Hbf	ICE 42	Hagen Hbf towards Hamburg-Altona
Solingen Hbf towards Wien Hbf	ICE 91	Hagen Hbf towards Dortmund Hbf
Solingen Hbf towards Stuttgart Hbf	IC 55	Hagen Hbf towards Dresden Hbf
Preceding station	National Express Germany	Following station
Wuppertal-Vohwinkel towards Aachen Hbf	RE 4 (Wupper-Express)	Wuppertal-Barmen towards Dortmund Hbf
Solingen Hbf towards Krefeld Hbf	RE 7 (Rhein-Münsterland-Express)	Wuppertal-Oberbarmen towards Rheine
Wuppertal-Vohwinkel towards Bonn-Mehlem	RB 48 (Rhein-Wupper-Bahn)	Wuppertal-Barmen towards Wuppertal-Oberbarmen
Preceding station		Following station
Wuppertal-Vohwinkel towards Venlo	RE 13	Wuppertal-Barmen towards Hamm (Westf) Hbf
Preceding station	DB Regio NRW	Following station
Wuppertal-Vohwinkel towards Wesel	RE 49	Terminus
Preceding station	Rhine-Ruhr S-Bahn	Following station
Wuppertal-Unterbarmen towards Solingen Hbf	S7	Terminus
Wuppertal-Steinbeck towards Mönchengladbach Hbf	S8	Wuppertal-Unterbarmen towards Hagen Hbf
Wuppertal-Steinbeck towards Haltern am See or Recklinghausen Hbf	S9	Wuppertal-Unterbarmen towards Hagen Hbf
Wuppertal-Steinbeck towards Kaarster See	S28	Terminus
Location

Wuppertal Hauptbahnhof (German for Wuppertal central station) is a railway station in the city of Wuppertal, just south of the Ruhr Area, in the German state of North Rhine-Westphalia. It is on the line between Düsseldorf/Cologne and Dortmund. The 1848 reception building is one of the oldest of its kind. The station was originally Elberfeld station and has been renamed several times since. Since 1992, it has been called Wuppertal Hauptbahnhof. Wuppertal Hauptbahnhof is also the site of lost luggage operations for Deutsche Bahn.

== History ==
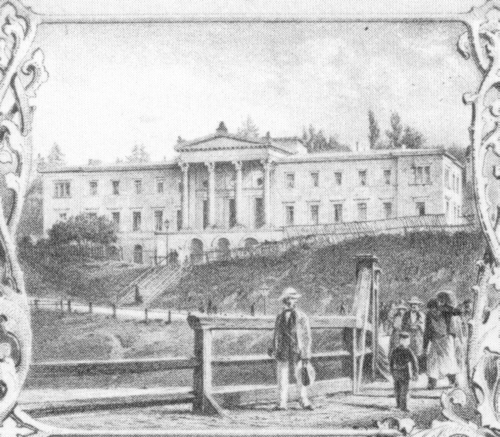
The Bergisch-Märkische station in 1855, lithography by Wilhelm Riefstahl

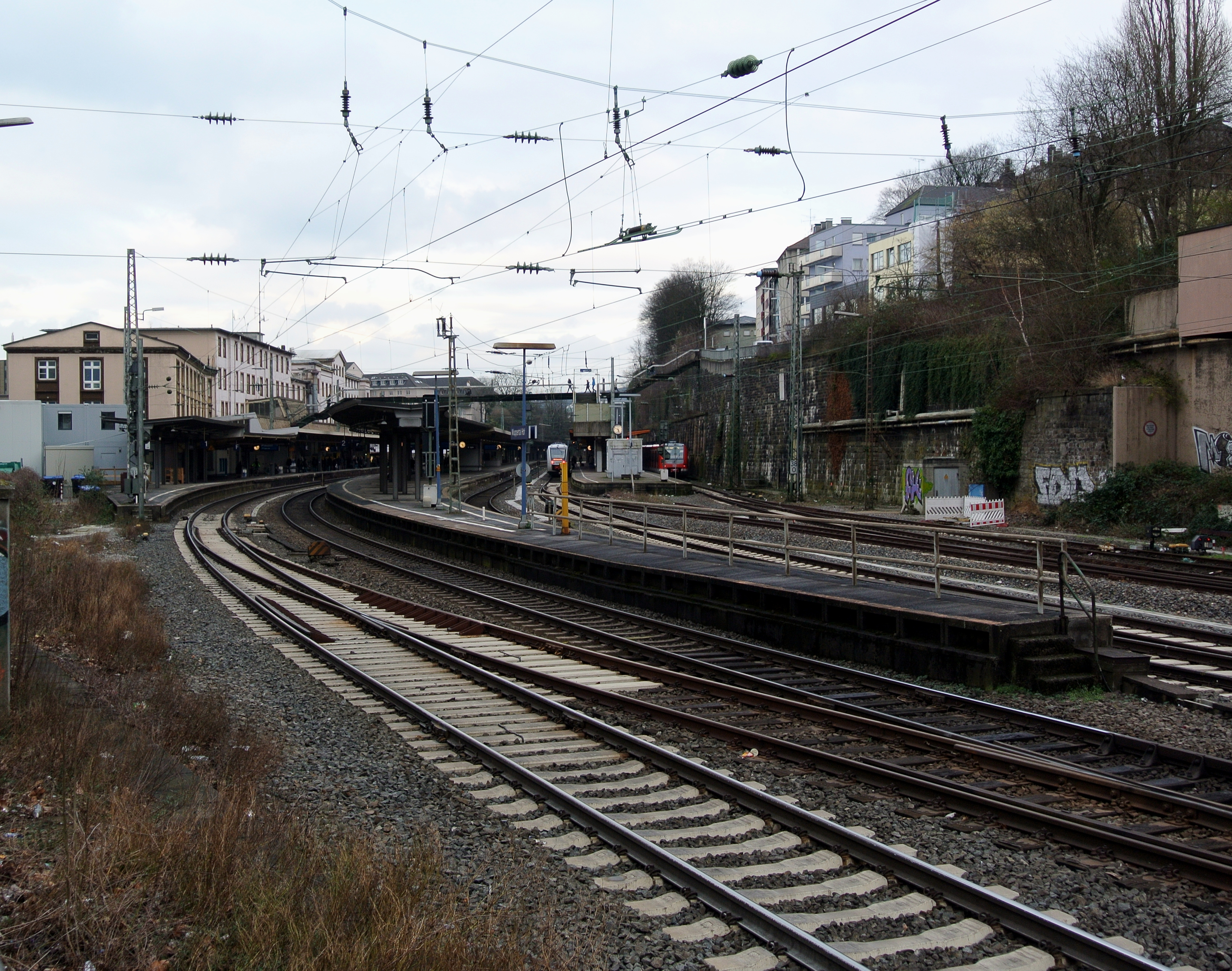
Western end of the smallest metropolitan station in Germany

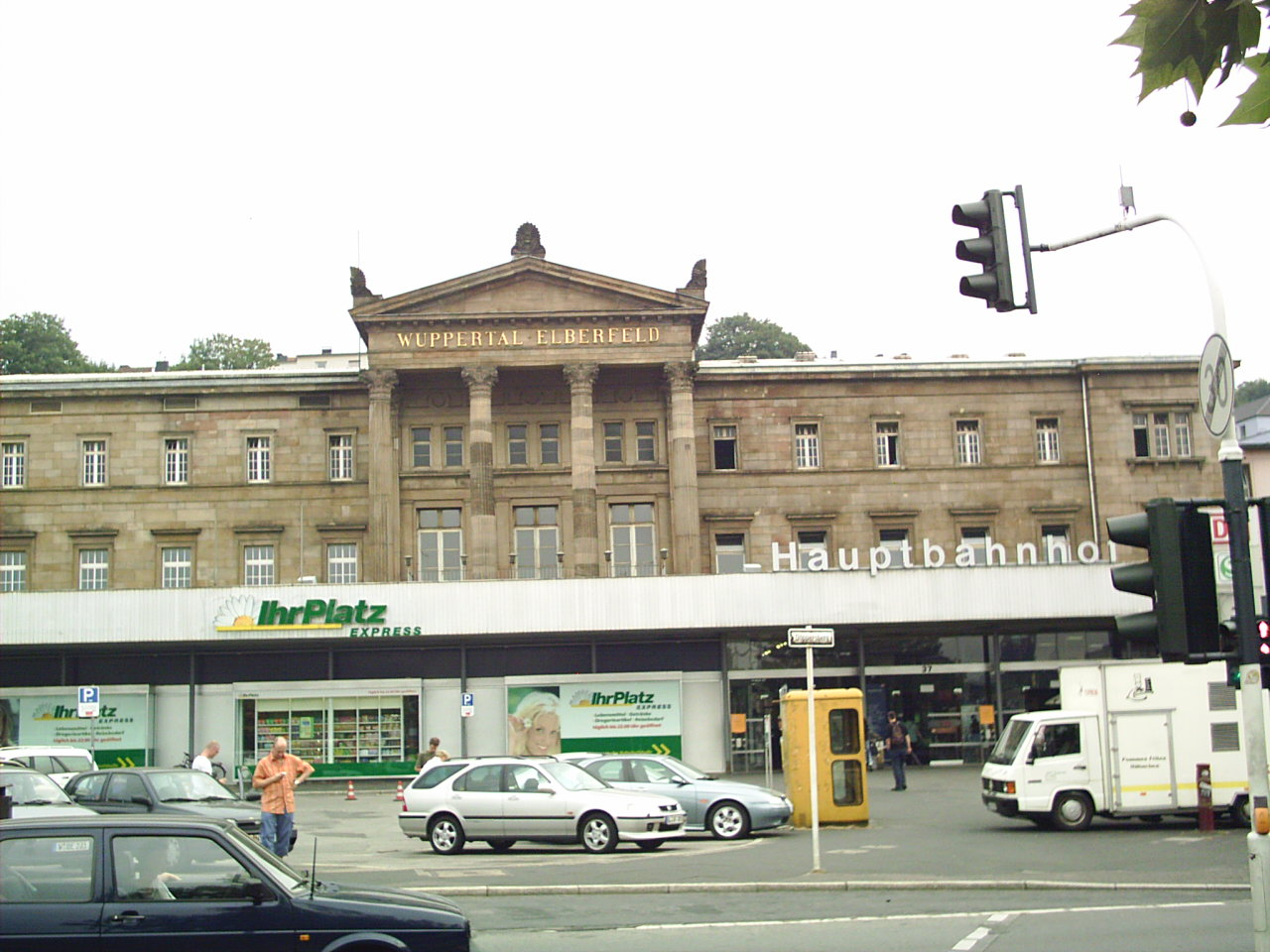
Station forecourt

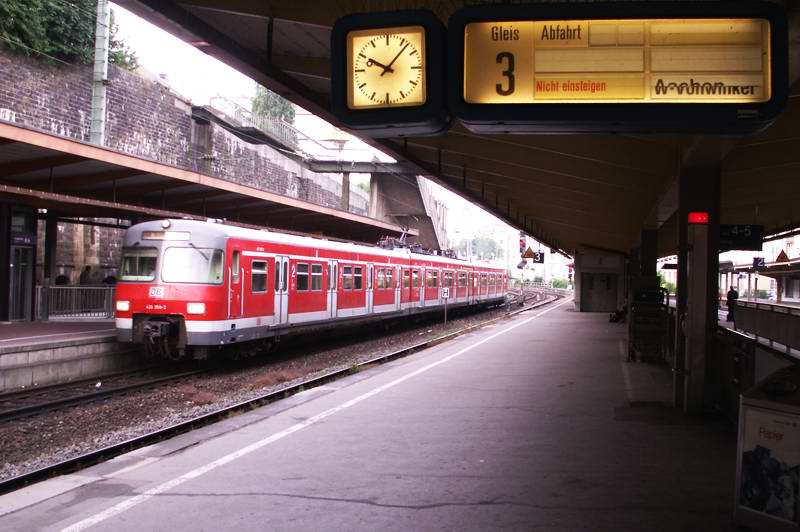
S-Bahn

On 3 September 1841, a few years after the opening of the first railway in Germany, the Dusseldorf-Elberfeld Railway Company (German: Düsseldorf-Elberfelder Eisenbahn-Gesellschaft, DEE) began operation of the Düsseldorf–Elberfeld line from its Düsseldorf station to its Elberfeld station (now Wuppertal-Steinbeck station). It was the first steam-worked railway line in Western Germany and Prussia.

The Bergisch-Märkische Railway Company (Bergisch-Märkische Eisenbahn-Gesellschaft, BME), opened its Elberfeld–Dortmund railway from its Elberfeld station (known as Döppersberg station) via Hagen to Dortmund to Schwelm on 9 October 1847. It was extended to Hagen and Dortmund on 20 December 1848. The BME took over the DEE in 1857.

The first provisional station building became inadequate within a few years. It was decided to build a new building, designed by Hauptner and Ebeling and opened in 1850 on a new section of line connecting the BME and DEE lines, which was completed on 9 March 1849. Around 1900, a protruding porch was built in front of the ground floor, which conflicted with the architectural design. Nevertheless, this concept was maintained after its reconstruction after World War II. This will only change with the completion of the current renovation of the station/Döppersberg area.

The station has been renamed several times. It was first called Elberfeld, but a few years later it was renamed Elberfeld-Döppersberg and before the First World War it was renamed Elberfeld Hauptbahnhof. In the early 1930s the station's name was changed to Wuppertal-Elberfeld station as a consequence of the merger of the towns of Elberfeld and Barmen as the city of Wuppertal. Finally in 1992, it was renamed Wuppertal Hauptbahnhof.

== Station buildings ==
The station building is located next to platform track 1 and is connected by a tunnel to tracks 2–5. Above the entrance, near the old Reichsbahn railway division of Elberfeld, there are four pillars supporting the roof. The building is connected by the 200-metre-long Döppersberg pedestrian tunnel directly with central Elberfeld and the Wuppertal Hbf (Döppersberg) Schwebebahn (monorail) station.

A McDonald's restaurant has been established in the premises of the former baggage check-in and in the tunnel under the entrance there a large newsagency/book shop and a bakery. The low building in front of the historic station building houses a pharmacy. In front of the entrance to the station there is a parking area, including a taxi stand, and nearby there is an Inter City Hotel.

=== Architecture ===
The original building is one of the oldest big city railway stations in Germany. It is a three-storey ashlar building bounded by tower-like corner projections. The main entrance in the middle of the building is a four-columned portico, with emphasised Corinthian capitals and has strong antique ornamentation. The ground floor originally had arched openings and it has six rectangular windows on each level and on each side of the portico. It was necessary in 1900 to build a ground-floor entrance porch to cater for the growing need for space for counters and waiting rooms.

The station is part of an ensemble of buildings built in neoclassical style, which is grouped around the railway station forecourt. On the western side of the square is the headquarters of the former Reichsbahn railway division of Elberfeld; on the eastern side there used to be the headquarters of the Chief General Manager, but thus was torn down after the Second World War.

The construction of the station was accompanied by extensive urban development in the Döppersberg area. The Döppersberg bridge (Döppersberger Brücke) was built to connect centre of old Elberfeld with the station over the Wupper.

=== Reconstruction since 2014 ===
The entire area around the station has been extensively reconstructed, finishing in 2018. The main goal was to create a continuous pedestrian and shopping area connecting the station to the city centre, as is already the case in many other German cities, such as Cologne, Stuttgart or Hanover. The B 7 which is a very busy arterial road, was relocated to a tunnel, while a pedestrian zone was built above it.

Preparations began in the summer of 2009, and the opening ceremony for work on the new, modernised station was held on 30 June 2009. Since the completion of the work in 2018, it has had a two-storey shopping level, a large station forecourt, which was built on the former Bahnhofstrasse, and a bridge and café over the B 7, which was lowered by about seven metres. A new bus station has replaced the bus stops that were previously on the B 7. It was built above a 200-space car park next to the station. Instead of a glass cube—which had previously been planned—a striking building with a bronze-coloured facade was built, which contains a Primark branch.

The modernisation of the Deutsche Bahn entrance building at an expected cost of €12.4 million started in 2014. This modernisation was expected to be completed in 2016.

In the course of the renovation, bus services were temporarily relocated from the street of Döppersberg to the districts of Ohligsmühle and Wall at the timetable change in July 2014. First Döppersberg was lowered from the end of October 2012 and then the eastern part of the station lobby was demolished from the end of February 2013. The tenancies in this area—pharmacy, pub, bank branch, bakery and fast food restaurant—were terminated in autumn 2012 and they were closed. The DB Travel Center was temporarily located in a shipping container at the western end of platform 1.

The B 7 was closed in July 2014 and the superstructure of the Döppersberg bridge was removed in August 2014. The pedestrian tunnel ending there was closed in January 2015. Instead, a steel replacement pedestrian bridge crossed the B-7 construction site. This involved a 300-metre-long walk around the station building. The B 7 was reopened to traffic in July 2017.

A computer-based interlocking was put into operation in the Wuppertal area at the end of August 2017. This involved the installation of 387 sets of signals, 98 sets of points and 374 kilometres of cable. In addition, track and overhead line work was pending. The station was completely closed for work during the Easter and summer holidays in 2017. A total of 90 replacement buses were operated.

The restoration of the historic entrance building was originally the responsibility of Deutsche Bahn, which wanted to find a private investor to carry out the restoration and subsequent operation by the spring of 2019. Deutsche Bahn also planned to sell some land at the station on which various ancillary buildings now stand to the municipal utility company, which intended to build the valley station of the planned Wuppertal cable car there. However, this project was abandoned after 61.6% of the participants voted against it in a citizens' poll on 26 May 2019. According to its own statement, Deutsche Bahn is in talks with "multiple interests". The selection process was stopped in the meantime to await the results of the citizens' survey and will continue after the decision of the town council to end the cable car project. However, it was not to be expected that the sale would be concluded in 2019.

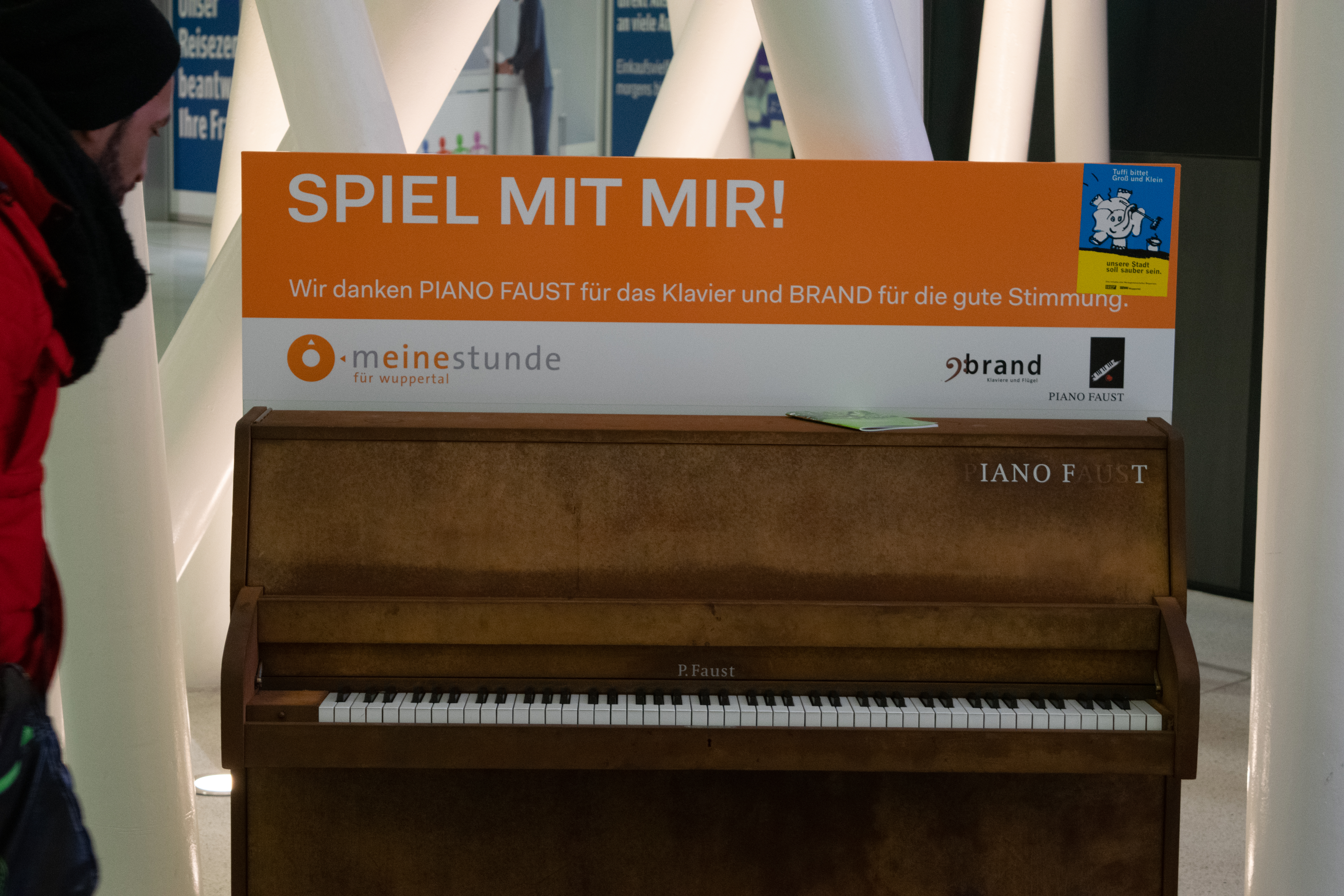
Public piano in the station concourse

A public piano has been located in the station hall since November 2018.

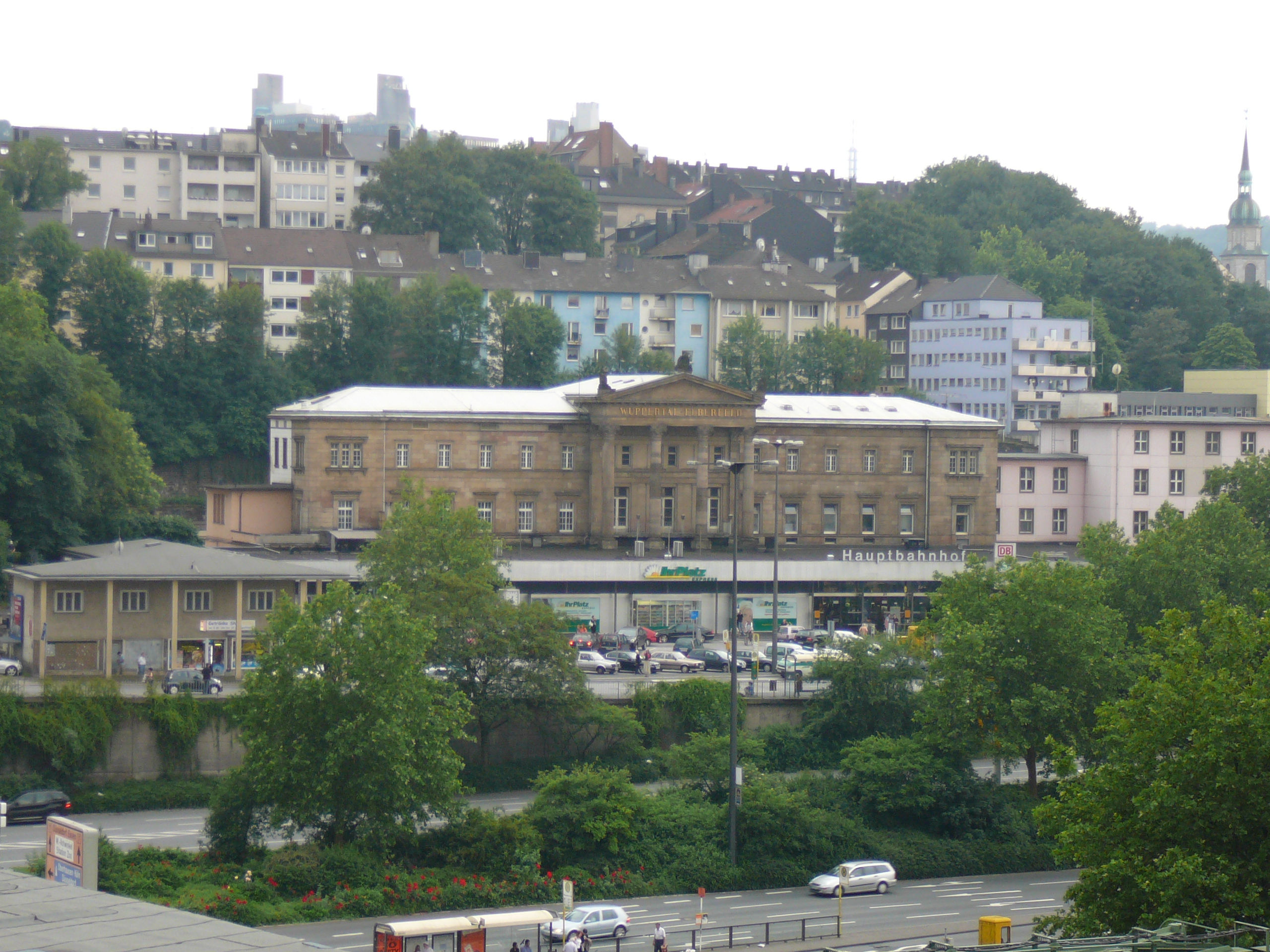
Entrance building before the demolition of the lobby

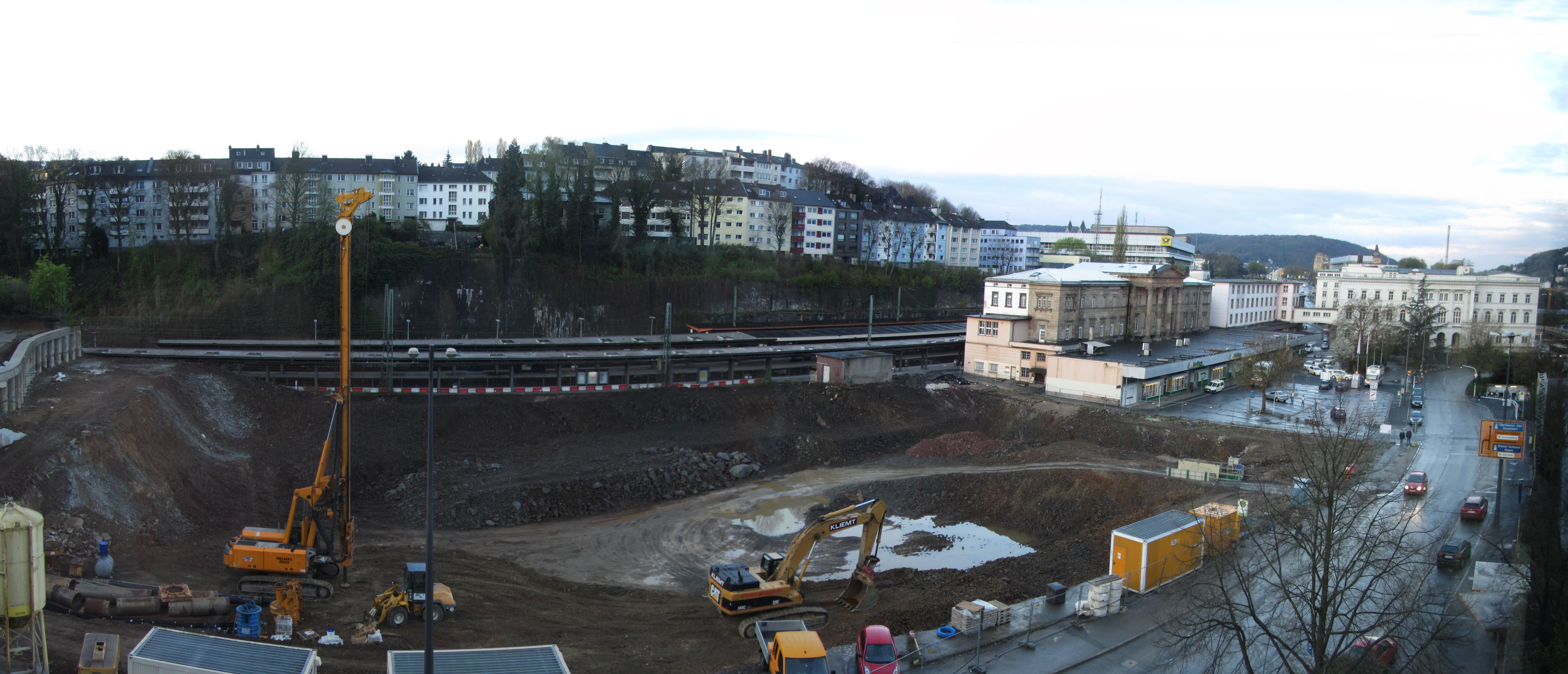
Construction site at Döppersberg in April 2012

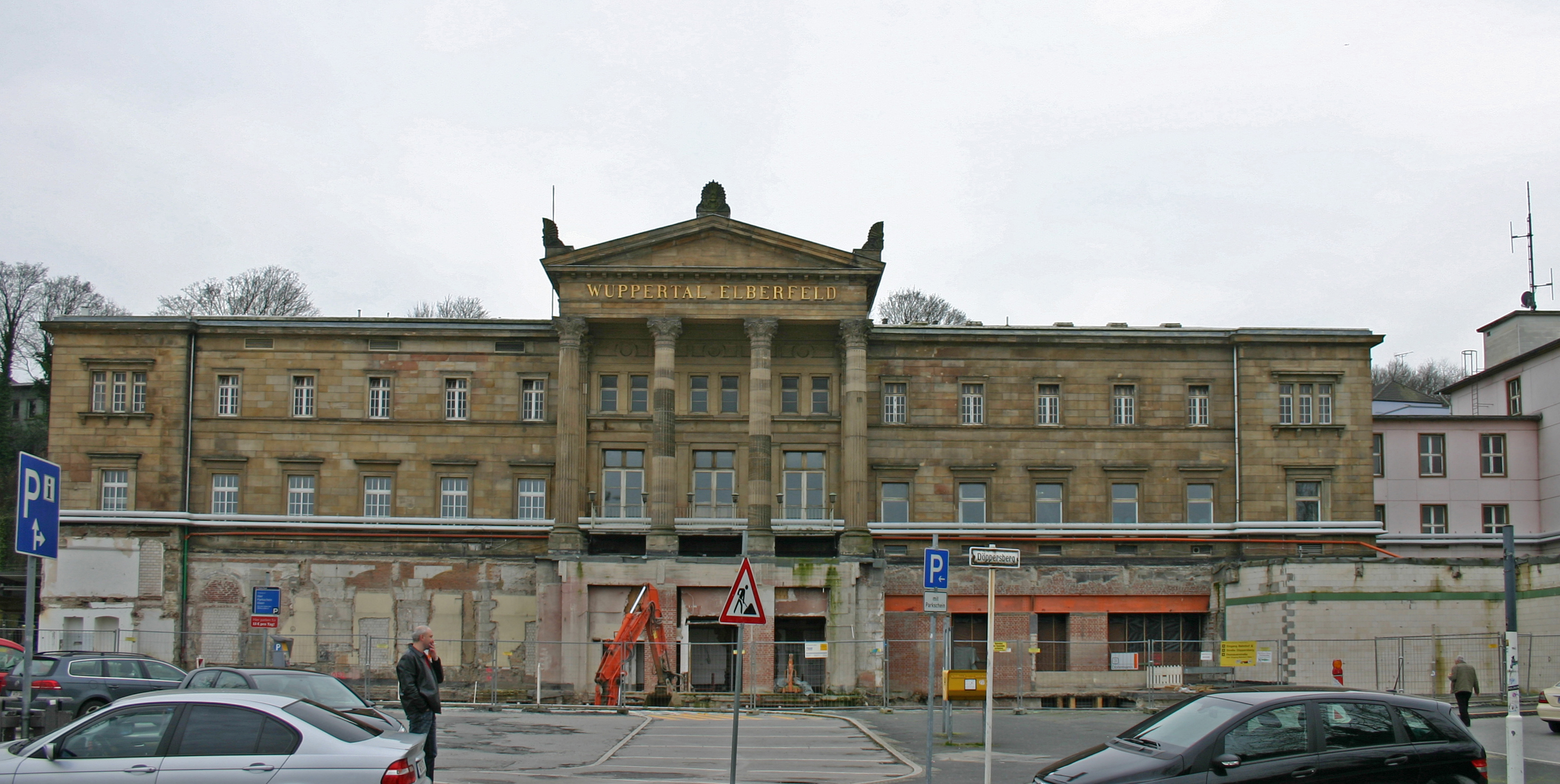
Entrance building, 2014

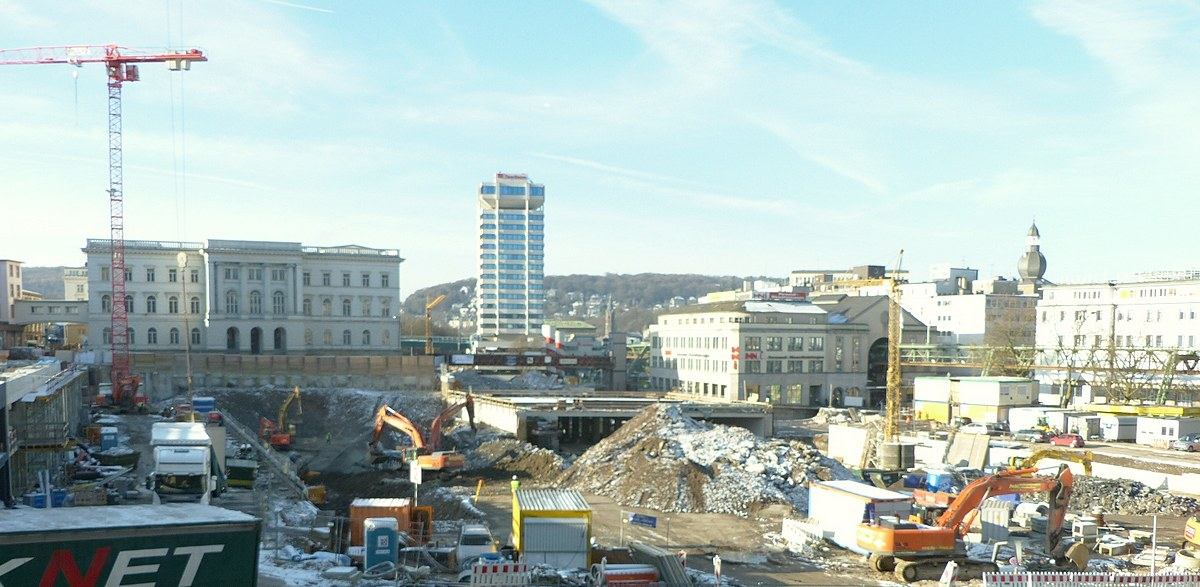
Construction progress in January 2016. The B7 tunnel (centre) runs parallel to the suspension railway (right) at the level of the Wupper.

== Services ==
Although the station possesses only five tracks, less than the other stations of the city, all services running through Wuppertal stop here, except for the S 68 S-Bahn service terminating in Vohwinkel.

Long-distance trains stop every 30 minutes on platforms 1 and 2 running in either direction. ICE line 10 (Cologne–Berlin) provides a direct connection to Berlin in under four hours.

=== Long distance trains ===
The following services currently call at Wuppertal Hauptbahnhof:

Line	Route	Frequency
ICE 10	Berlin – Hannover – Bielefeld – Hamm – Hagen – Wuppertal – Cologne	Every 2 Hours
ICE 19	Berlin – Hannover – Bielefeld – Hamm – Hagen – Wuppertal – Cologne (– Bonn – Andernach – Koblenz)	Every 2 Hours
ICE 42	Dortmund – Hagen – Wuppertal – Solingen – Cologne – Frankfurt Airport – Mannheim – Stuttgart – Munich	Some trains
IC 55	Dresden – Leipzig – Leipzig/Halle Airport – Halle – Magdeburg – Braunschweig – Hannover – Bielefeld – Hamm – Dortmund – Hagen – Wuppertal – Solingen – Cologne – Bonn – Koblenz – Mainz – Mannheim – Heidelberg – Stuttgart	Every 2 Hours
ICE 91	Dortmund – Hagen – Wuppertal – Solingen – Cologne – Bonn – Koblenz – Mainz – Frankfurt Airport – Frankfurt – Würzburg – Nuremberg – Regensburg – Passau – Linz – St. Pölten – Vienna	Some trains

=== Regional and S-Bahn trains ===
The following Regional-Express, Regionalbahn and S-Bahn services call at Wuppertal Hbf:

Line	Route	Frequency
RE 4 Wupper-Express	Aachen – Mönchengladbach – Düsseldorf – Wuppertal – Hagen – Dortmund	60 mins
RE 7 Rhein-Münsterland-Express	Krefeld – Neuss – Cologne – Solingen – Wuppertal – Hagen – Hamm (Westf) – Münster (Westf) – Rheine	60 mins
RE 13 Maas-Wupper-Express	Venlo – Viersen – Mönchengladbach – Düsseldorf – Wuppertal – Hagen – Hamm (Westf)	60 mins
RB 48 Rhein-Wupper-Bahn	(Bonn-Mehlem – Bonn Hbf –) Cologne – Solingen – Wuppertal – Oberbarmen	30 mins
RE 49 Wupper-Lippe-Express	Wesel – Oberhausen – Mülheim – Essen – Wuppertal	60 mins
S7	Solingen – Remscheid – Wuppertal-Oberbarmen – Wuppertal	20 mins
S8	(Hagen – Gevelsberg –) Wuppertal-Oberbarmen – Wuppertal – Düsseldorf – Neuss – Mönchengladbach	60 mins (20 mins: W-Oberbarmen – Mönchengladbach)
S9	(Recklinghausen / Haltern am See) – Gladbeck - Bottrop – Essen – Velbert-Langenberg – Wuppertal (– Wuppertal-Oberbarmen – Gevelsberg – Hagen)	60 mins: Recklinghausen / Haltern am See / Hagen 30 mins: Wuppertal Hbf – Gladbeck West
S28	Kaarster See – Neuss – Düsseldorf – Mettmann Stadtwald – Wuppertal	20/40 mins (alternating)

The Wuppertal Suspension Railway (German: Wuppertaler Schwebebahn) has a stop nearby.

== See also ==
- Rail transport in Germany
- Railway stations in Germany
