= Neuss Am Kaiser station =

Railway station in Neuss, Germany

Neuss Am Kaiser
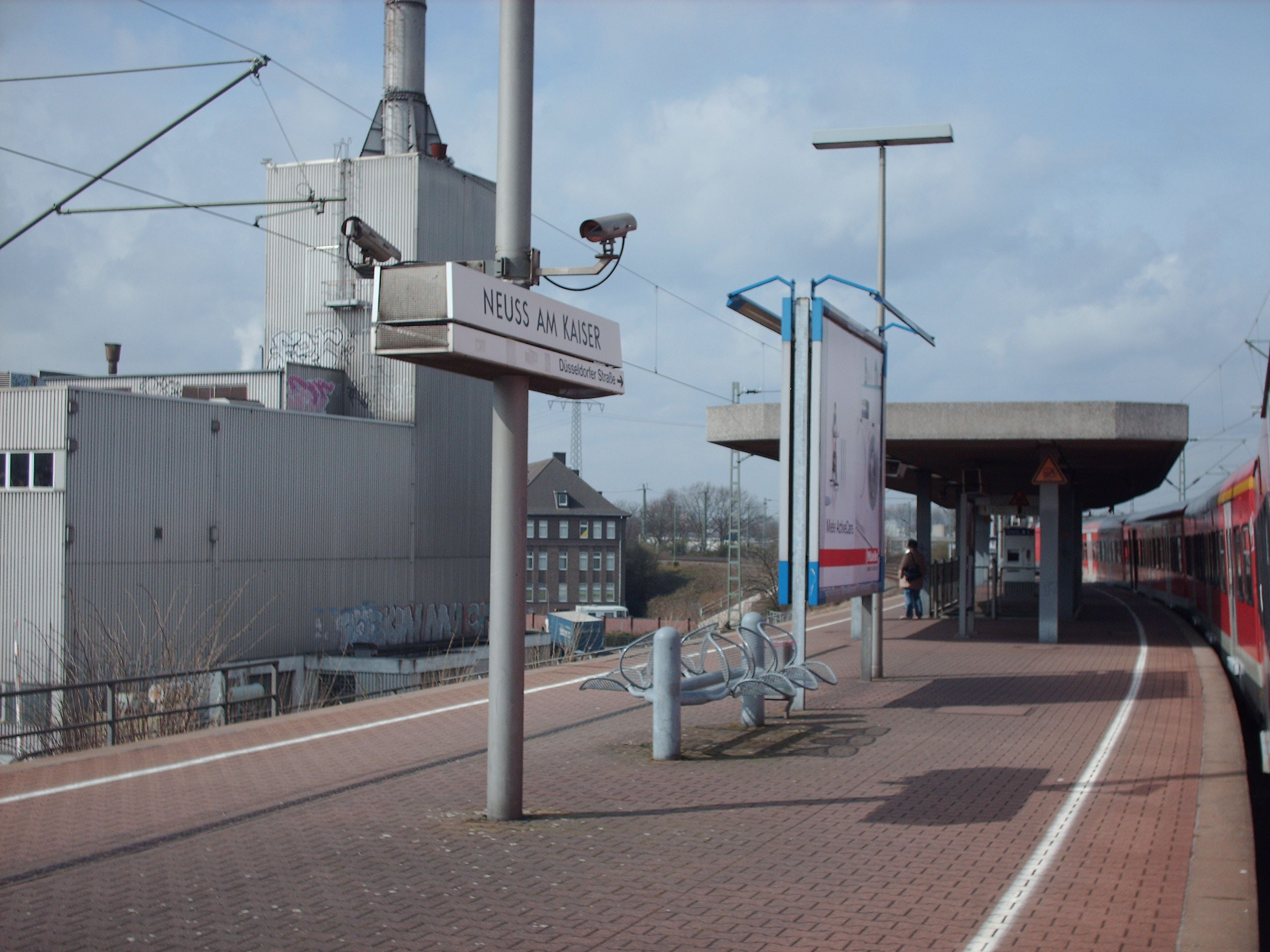

General information
- Location: Düsseldorferstr. 182, Neuss, NRW; Germany
- Coordinates: 51°13′12″N 6°41′55″E
- Lines: Mönchengladbach–Düsseldorf (KBS 450.8)
- Platforms: 2

Construction
- Accessible: No

Other information
- Station code: 4439
- DS100 code: KNAK
- IBNR: 8004320
- Category: 5
- Fare zone: VRR: 420, 438, and 520; VRS: 1430 and 1520 (VRR transitional tariff)
- Website: www.bahnhof.de

History
- Opened: 29 May 1988

Services
Preceding station	Rhine-Ruhr S-Bahn	Following station
Neuss Hbf towards Mönchengladbach Hbf	S8	Neuss Rheinpark-Center towards Hagen Hbf
Neuss Hbf towards Kaarster See	S28	Neuss Rheinpark-Center towards Wuppertal Hbf
Preceding station	Cologne S-Bahn	Following station
Neuss Hbf towards Bergisch Gladbach	S11	Neuss Rheinpark-Center towards Düsseldorf Airport Terminal
Preceding station	Rhine-Ruhr Stadtbahn	Following station
Blücherstraße towards Neuss Hbf	U75	Vogesenstraße towards Eller Vennhauser Allee
Location

Neuss Am Kaiser station is a station in the district of Barbaraviertel of the city of Neuss in the German state of North Rhine-Westphalia. It is on the Mönchengladbach–Düsseldorf railway and it is classified by Deutsche Bahn as a category 5 station. The station opened on 29 May 1988 on the new line built with the Hamm railway bridge opened by the Bergisch-Märkische Railway Company on 24 July 1870.

The station is served by three S-Bahn lines: S 8 (running between Hagen and Mönchengladbach), S 11 (running between Düsseldorf Airport and Bergisch Gladbach) and S 28 (running between Mettmann Stadtwald or Wuppertal and Kaarster See), each operating every 20 minutes during the day.

It is also served by Düsseldorf Stadtbahn line route U 75, operated at 10-minute intervals, and by bus routes 830, operated by Rheinbahn at 20-minute intervals, and 864, operated by Busverkehr Rheinland at 60-minute intervals.
