= Düsseldorf Völklinger Straße station =

Railway station in Düsseldorf, Germany

Düsseldorf Völklinger Straße
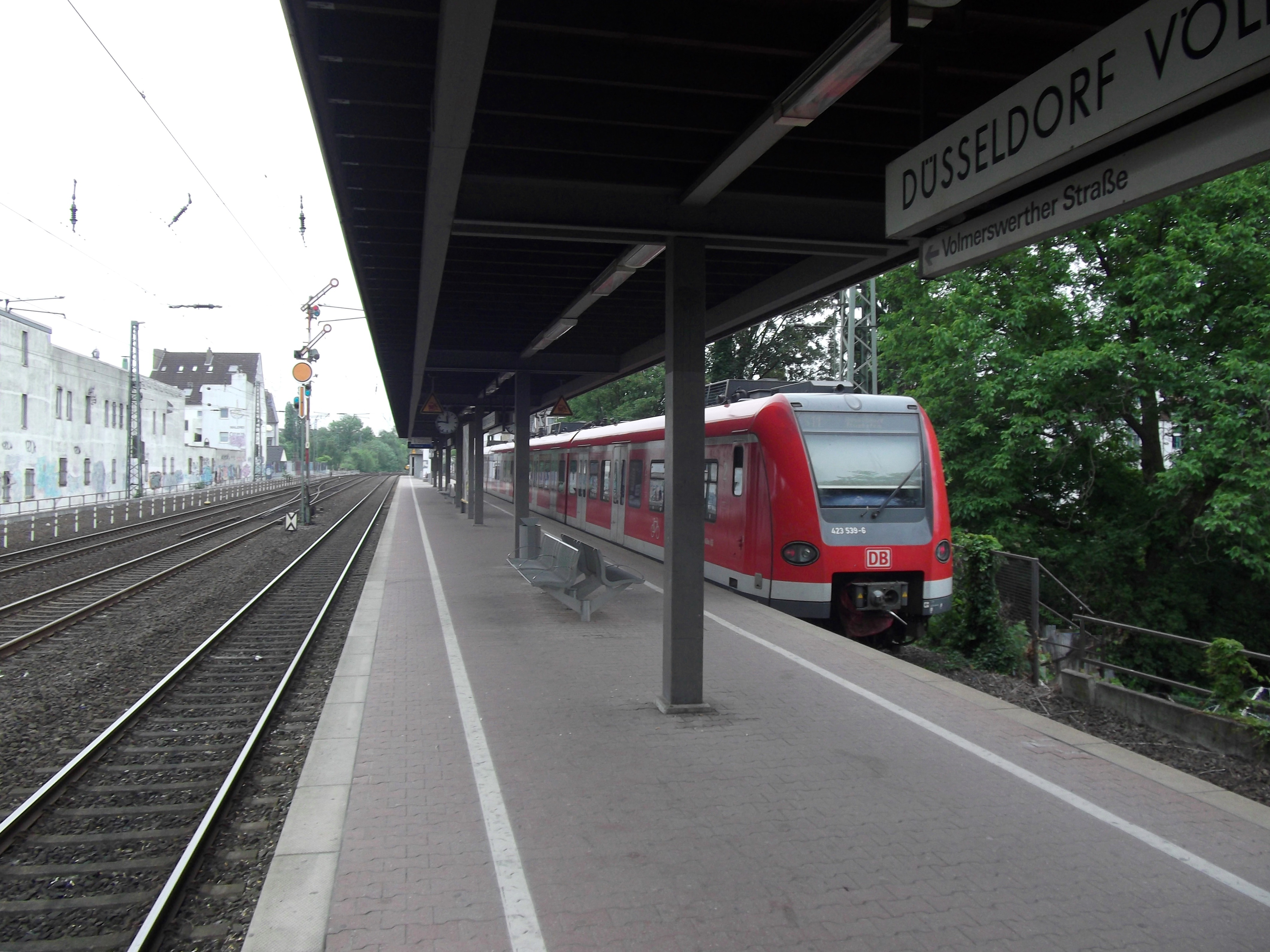

General information
- Location: Unterbilk, Düsseldorf, NRW; Germany
- Coordinates: 51°12′37″N 6°45′37″E
- Owner: Deutsche Bahn
- Operator: DB Netz; DB Station&Service
- Lines: Mönchengladbach–Düsseldorf (KBS 450.8)
- Platforms: 1 island platform
- Tracks: 2
- Train operators: DB Regio NRW; Regiobahn GmbH

Construction
- Accessible: No

Other information
- Station code: 1421
- DS100 code: KDVS
- Category: 5
- Fare zone: VRR: 430; VRS: 1430 (VRR transitional zone)
- Website: www.bahnhof.de

History
- Opened: 29 May 1988

Services
Preceding station	Rhine-Ruhr S-Bahn	Following station
Düsseldorf-Hamm towards Mönchengladbach Hbf	S8	Düsseldorf-Bilk towards Hagen Hbf
Düsseldorf-Hamm towards Kaarster See	S28	Düsseldorf-Bilk towards Wuppertal Hbf
Preceding station	Cologne S-Bahn	Following station
Düsseldorf-Hamm towards Bergisch Gladbach	S11	Düsseldorf-Bilk towards Düsseldorf Airport Terminal
Location

Düsseldorf Völklinger Straße station is a through station in the district of Unterbilk in the city of Düsseldorf in the German state of North Rhine-Westphalia. The station was opened on 29 May 1988 on the new line opened by the Prussian state railways on 1 October 1891 between the Hamm Railway Bridge and Gerresheim as part of the construction of Düsseldorf Hauptbahnhof. It has two platform tracks and it is classified by Deutsche Bahn as a category 5 station.

The station is served by S-Bahn lines S8 between Mönchengladbach and Wuppertal-Oberbarmen or Hagen, S11 between Düsseldorf Airport and Bergisch Gladbach and S28 between Mettmann Stadtwald or Wuppertal and Kaarster See, each every 20 minutes.

The station is also served by tram line 709 and bus route 726, both operated by Rheinbahn.
