= Rheinpark (disambiguation) =

Rheinpark is an urban park along the right bank of the Rhein in Cologne, Germany.

Rheinpark may also refer to:

- Rheinpark Stadion, the national sports stadium in Vaduz, Liechtenstein
- Rheinpark in Düsseldorf-Golzheim
- Rheinpark high-rise apartment complex in Birsfelden, Switzerland

== See also ==
- Neuss Rheinpark-Center station, North Rhine-Westphalia, Germany
