= Düsseldorf-Bilk station =

Railway station in Bilk, Germany

Düsseldorf Bilk
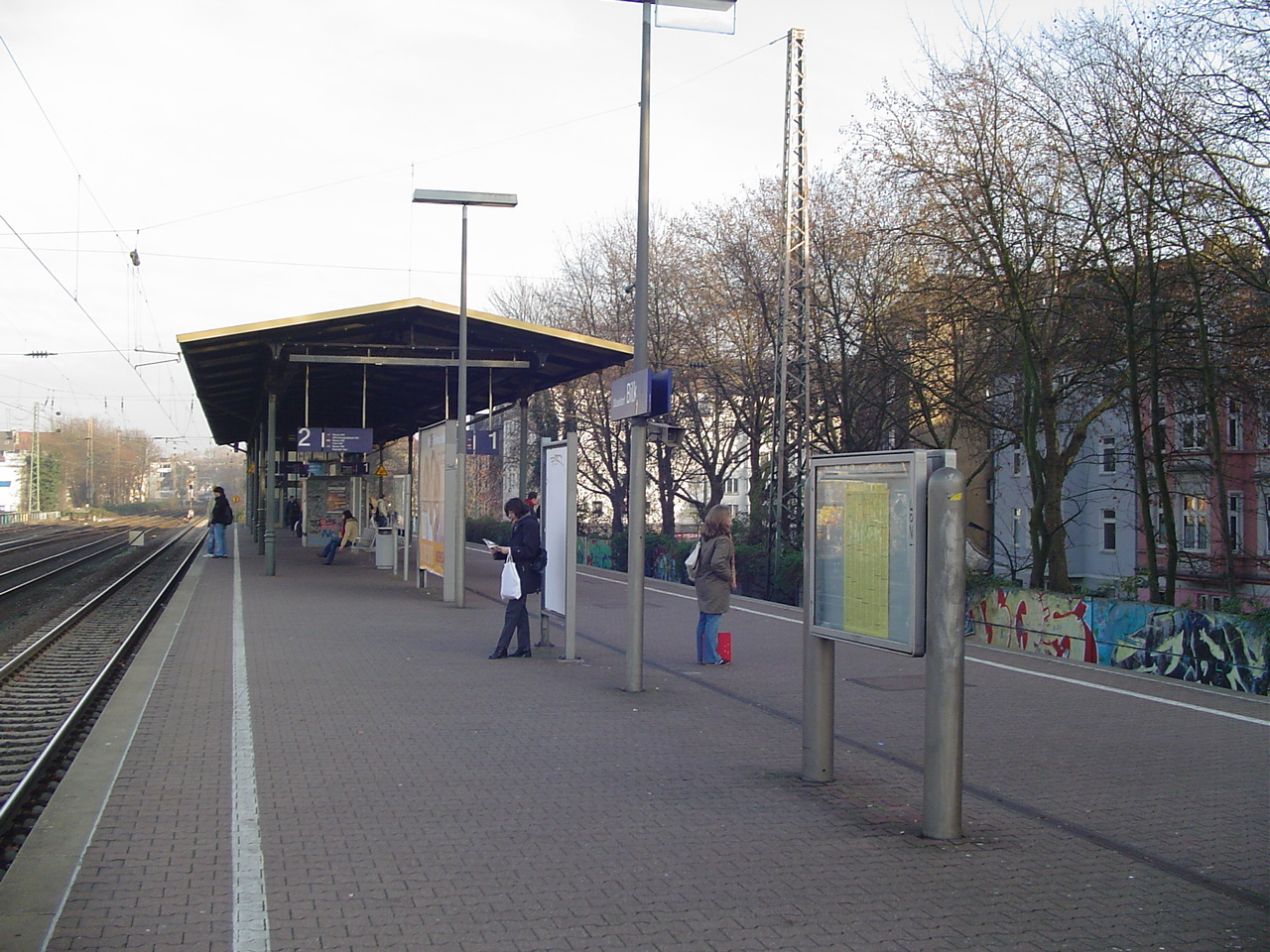

General information
- Location: Friedrichstr. 145; Bilk, Düsseldorf, NRW; Germany
- Coordinates: 51°12′28″N 6°46′37″E
- Lines: Düsseldorf–Elberfeld (KBS 450.8)
- Platforms: 2 island platforms
- Tracks: 4

Construction
- Accessible: Yes

Other information
- Station code: 1405
- DS100 code: KDBI (regional platforms); KDBH (S-Bahn platforms)
- IBNR: 8001585
- Category: 4
- Fare zone: VRR: 430; VRS: 1430 (VRR transitional zone)
- Website: www.bahnhof.de

History
- Opened: 1891

Services
Preceding station	National Express Germany	Following station
Neuss Hbf towards Aachen Hbf	RE 4 (Wupper-Express)	Düsseldorf Hbf towards Dortmund Hbf
Neuss Hbf towards Cologne/Bonn Airport	RE 6 (Rhein-Weser-Express)	Düsseldorf Hbf towards Minden
Preceding station	NordWestBahn	Following station
Meerbusch-Osterath towards Kleve	RE 10	Düsseldorf Hbf Terminus
Preceding station		Following station
Neuss Hbf towards Venlo	RE 13	Düsseldorf Hbf towards Hamm (Westf) Hbf
Preceding station	VIAS	Following station
Neuss Hbf towards Bedburg	RB 39	Düsseldorf Hbf Terminus
Preceding station	Rhine-Ruhr S-Bahn	Following station
Düsseldorf Völklinger Straße towards Mönchengladbach Hbf	S8	Düsseldorf-Friedrichstadt towards Hagen Hbf
Düsseldorf Völklinger Straße towards Kaarster See	S28	Düsseldorf-Friedrichstadt towards Wuppertal Hbf
Preceding station	Cologne S-Bahn	Following station
Düsseldorf Völklinger Straße towards Bergisch Gladbach	S11	Düsseldorf-Friedrichstadt towards Düsseldorf Airport Terminal
Preceding station	Rhine-Ruhr Stadtbahn	Following station
Kirchplatz towards Düsseldorf-Rath	U71	Karolingerplatz towards Benrath Betriebshof
Kirchplatz towards Hellriegelstraße	U72	Suitbertusstraße towards Ratingen Mitte
Kirchplatz towards Universität Ost/Botanischer Garten	U73	Karolingerplatz towards Düsseldorf-Gerresheim
Kirchplatz towards Gerresheim Krankenhaus	U83	Karolingerplatz towards Benrath Betriebshof
Location

Düsseldorf-Bilk station is a through station in the district of Bilk in the city of Düsseldorf in the German state of North Rhine-Westphalia. It has two platforms and it is classified by Deutsche Bahn as a category 4 station.

== History ==
The station is on the new line opened by the Prussian state railways on 1 October 1891 between the Hamm Railway Bridge and Gerresheim as part of the construction of Düsseldorf Hauptbahnhof. The station building built in 1891 was demolished in 1986, as part of the rebuilding of the line for the establishment of Rhine-Ruhr S-Bahn lines S 8. On 18 March 2022, a new second platform for regional train services opened.

== Services ==
The station is served by three S-Bahn lines:

- S 8 between Mönchengladbach and Wuppertal-Oberbarmen or Hagen, every 20 minutes
- S 11 between Bergisch Gladbach and Düsseldorf Airport, every 20 minutes
- S 28 between Mettmann Stadtwald or Wuppertal and Kaarster See, every 20 minutes

Since March 2022, the following five regional train services also serve the station:

- RE 4 between Aachen and Dortmund, every 60 minutes
- RE 6 between Cologne/Bonn Airport and Minden (Westf), every 60 minutes
- RE 10 between Kleve and Düsseldorf, every 30 minutes
- RE 13 between Venlo and Hamm (Westf), every 60 minutes
- RB 39 between Bedburg (Erft) and Düsseldorf, every 60 minutes on weekdays

It is served by two bus routes operated by Rheinbahn at 20-minute intervals: 835 and 836.

== Stadtbahn ==
The Düsseldorf Stadtbahn has a tunnel from Düsseldorf-Bilk station to Düsseldorf-Wehrhahn station, known as the Wehrhahn line (German: Wehrhahn-Linie). This 3.5 km tunnel was completed in 2016. Just as every other underground line opened previously in Düsseldorf, the Wehrhahn line is a replacement for current surface tram lines. The trams on this line are entering the new tunnel over a ramp at Bilk station and run from there underneath the city centre towards the north-east, where they are emerging shortly before Wehrhahn railway station. Five new underground stations and the station Heinrich-Heine-Allee are part of the line, which serve an estimated daily passenger volume of approximately 53,000. These new stations are Pempelforter Straße, Schadowstraße, the existing station Heinrich-Heine-Allee, Benrather Straße, Graf-Adolf-Platz and Kirchplatz (Düsseldorf) in the direction from Wehrhahn station to Bilk station. The new lines are the U71, U72, U73 and U83.
