= Erkelenz station =

Railway station in Erkelenz, Germany

Erkelenz
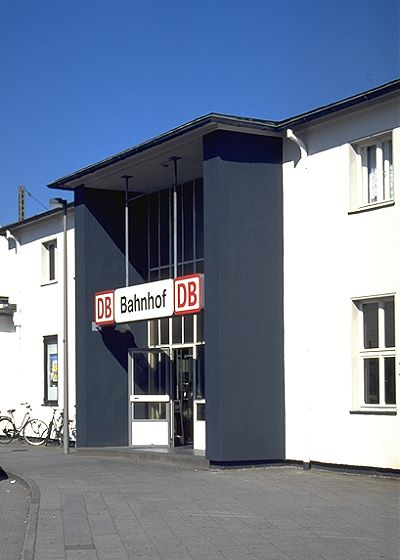
- Station building, 2007

General information
- Location: Konrad-Adenauer-Platz 1, Erkelenz, NRW; Germany
- Coordinates: 51°4′36.2″N 6°19′16.8″E
- Line: Aachen–Mönchengladbach
- Platforms: 2

Construction
- Accessible: Yes

Other information
- Station code: 1643
- DS100 code: KERZ
- IBNR: 8001839
- Category: 4
- Fare zone: AVV: 140; VRS: 3490 (AVV transitional tariff)
- Website: www.bahnhof.de

History
- Opened: 12 November 1852

Services
Preceding station	DB Fernverkehr	Following station
Geilenkirchen towards Aachen Hbf	ICE 10	Rheydt Hbf One-way operation
Geilenkirchen towards Aachen Hbf	ICE 14	Rheydt Hbf towards Berlin Ostbahnhof
Preceding station	DB Regio NRW	Following station
Hückelhoven-Baal towards Aachen Hbf	RB 33	Herrath towards Essen-Steele
Preceding station	National Express Germany	Following station
Hückelhoven-Baal towards Aachen Hbf	RE 4 (Wupper-Express)	Rheydt Hbf towards Dortmund Hbf
Location

Erkelenz station on the Aachen–Mönchengladbach railway is in the town of Erkelenz in the German state of North Rhine-Westphalia. It has been classified by Deutsche Bahn since January 2011 as a category 4 station. The station is served by the Wupper-Express and the Rhein-Niers-Bahn.

It consists of a simple station building from the 1950s with two platforms. Close to the station there are a park and ride lot and transfer facilities to express, regional and city buses.

While freight has declined in importance at Erkelenz station with the relocation of heavy traffic from rail to road in the 1980s, passenger traffic has developed to such an extent that the station today is the most important stop between Aachen and Moenchengladbach, based on entry and exit numbers. From 1992 to 2001, Erkelenz station was an InterRegio stop on the route towards eastern Germany (Aachen–Chemnitz). With the conversion of the railway line to electronic interlocking operation in November 2007, the crossovers were taken out, so the station is now regarded operationally as a halt, and the new German Ks-Signal system of signalling was installed. The former third platform track was taken out of use during the remodelling so that trains can no longer overtake at the station. Later, the third track was completely dismantled.

== Rail services ==
The following services stop at the station:

Line	Line name	Route
RE 4	Wupper-Express	Aachen – Herzogenrath – Geilenkirchen – Erkelenz – Mönchengladbach – Düsseldorf – Wuppertal – Hagen – Dortmund
RB 33	Rhein-Niers-Bahn	Aachen Hbf – Herzogenrath – Übach-Palenberg – Geilenkirchen – Hückelhoven-Baal – Erkelenz – Rheydt – Mönchengladbach Hbf – Viersen – Krefeld – Rheinhausen – Duisburg – Mülheim – Essen

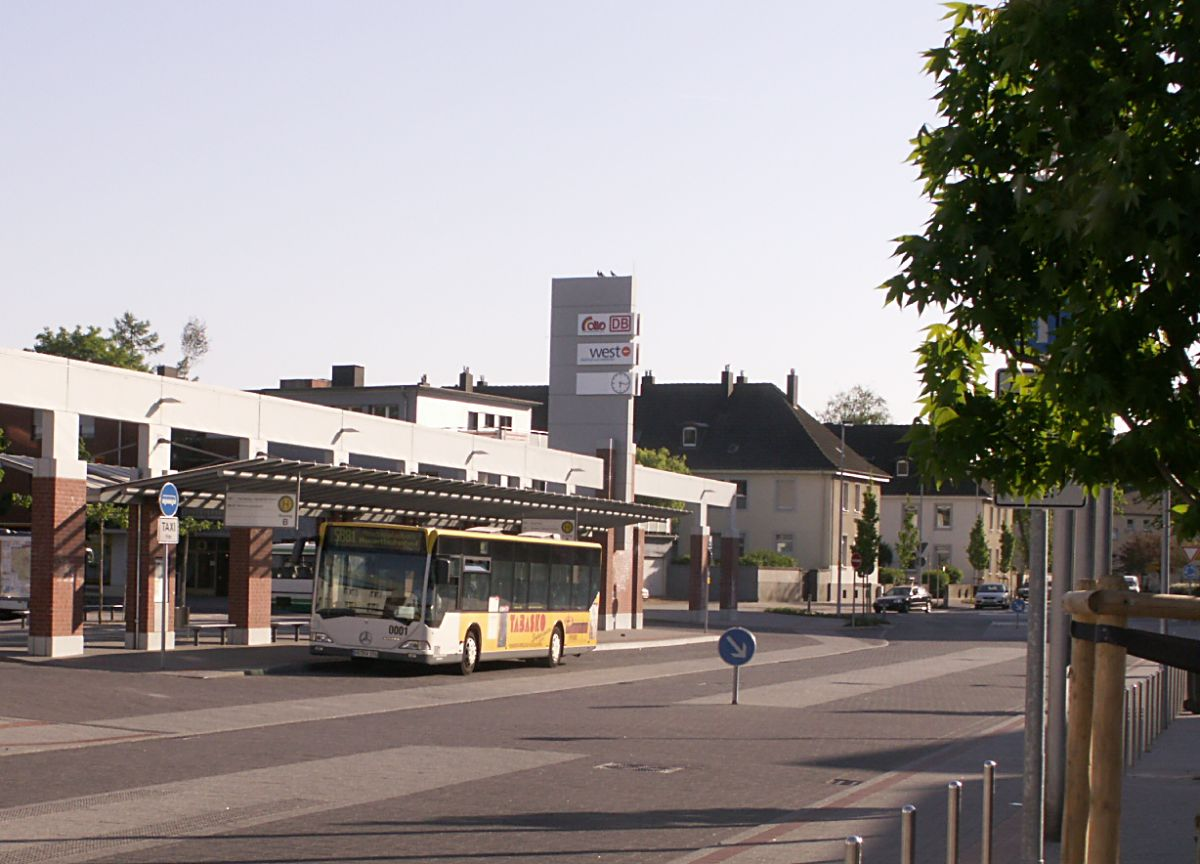
Entrance building and bus station

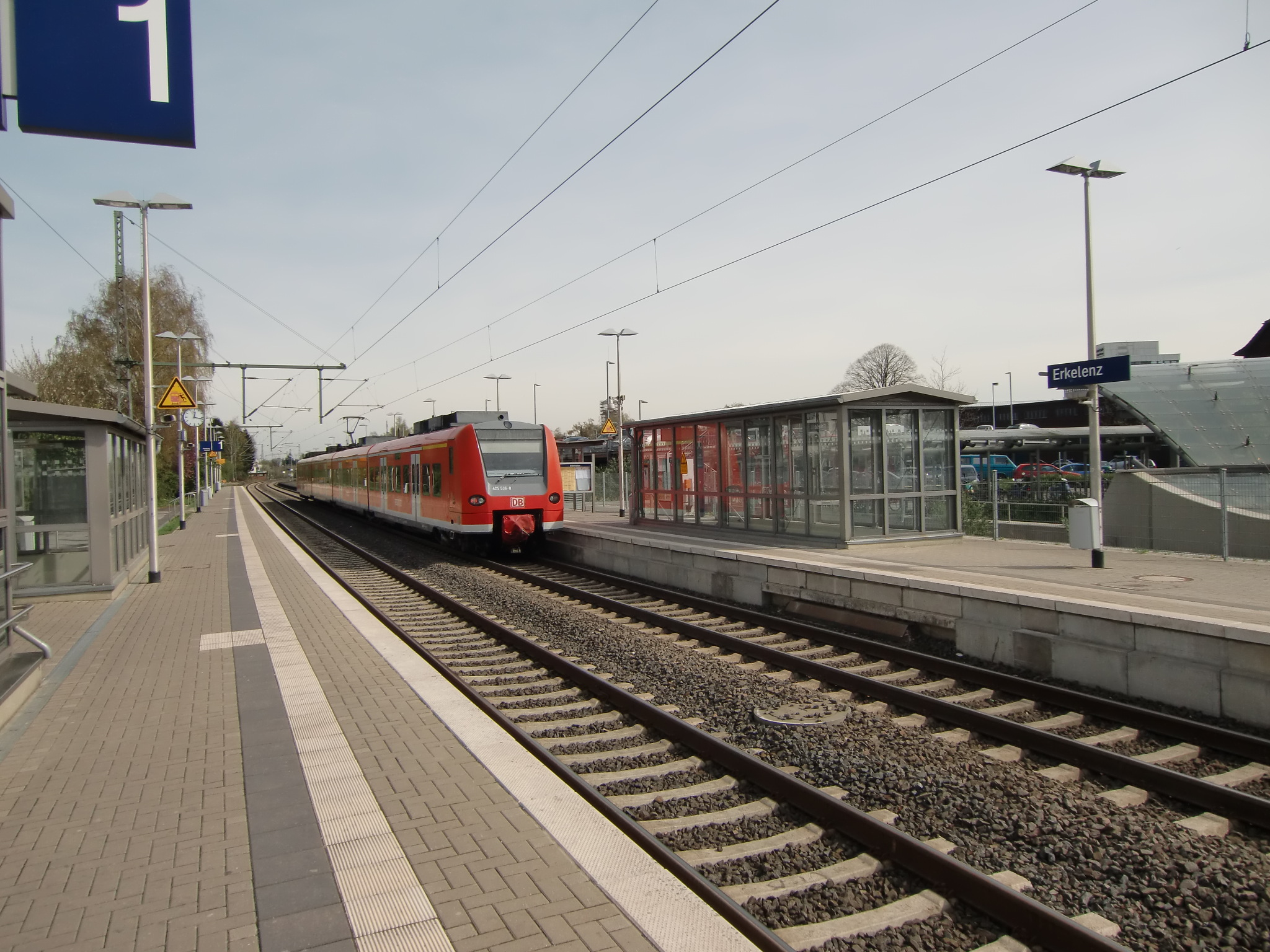
Platforms

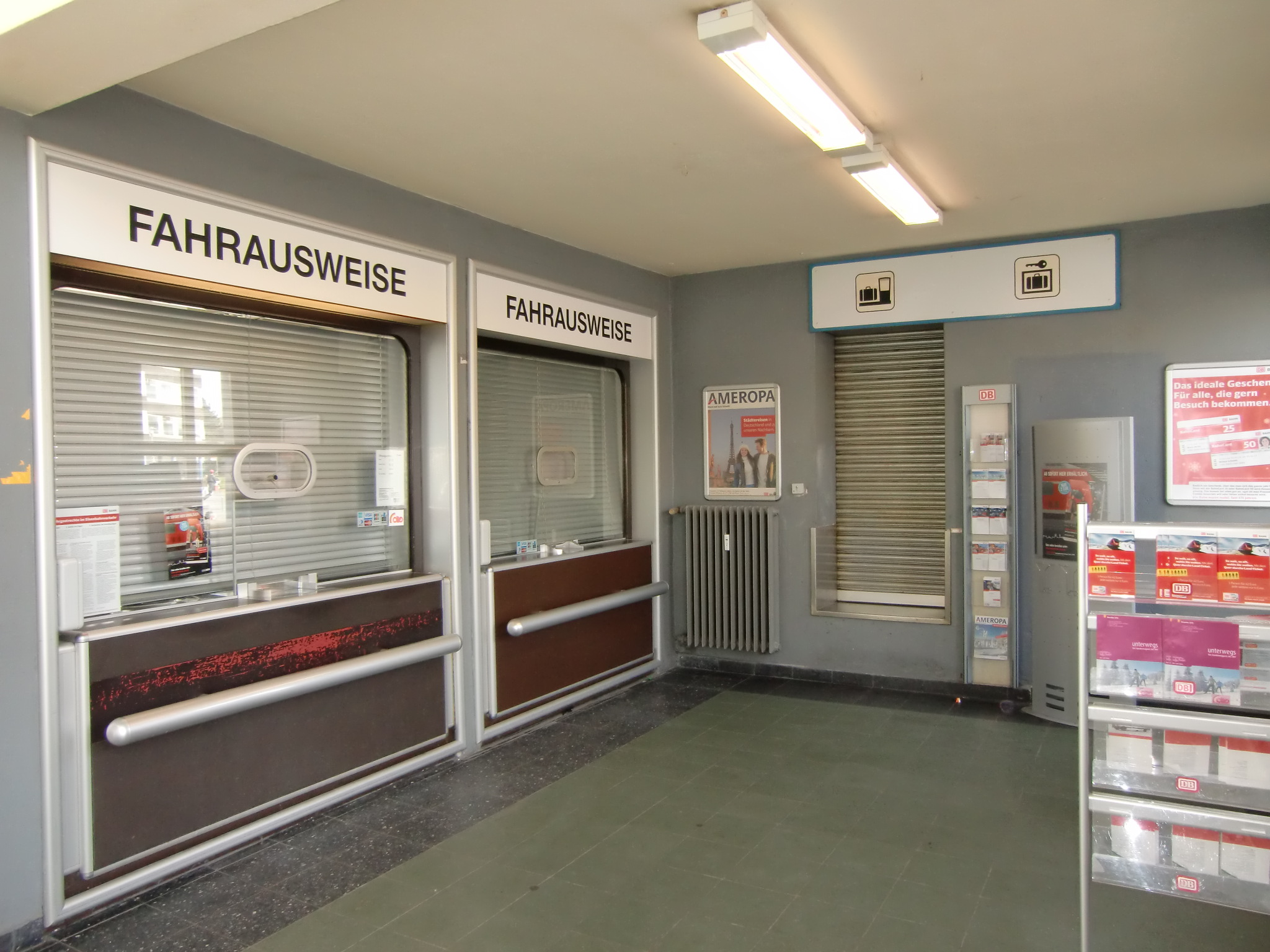
Ticket office

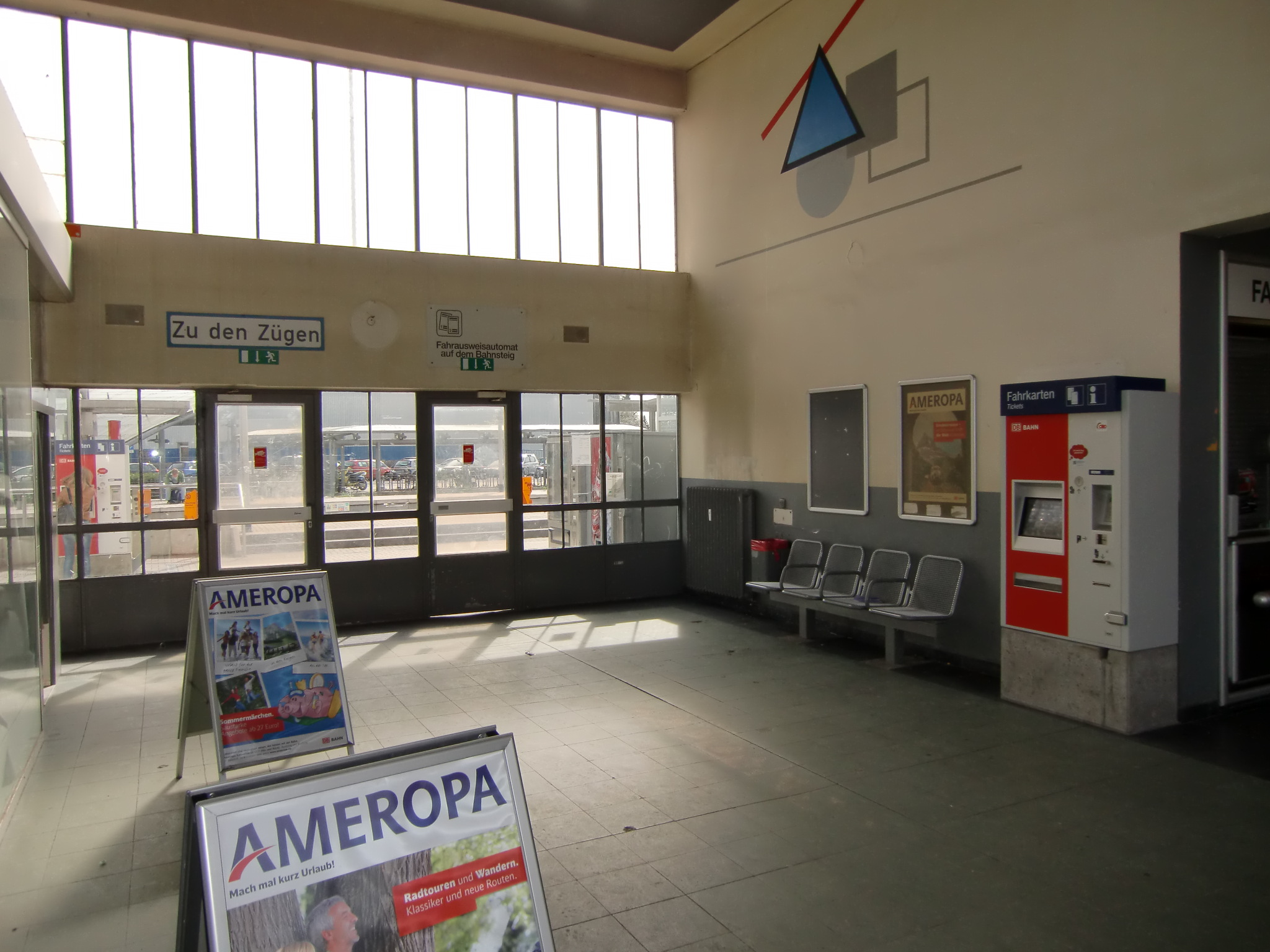
Station hall
