= Hückelhoven-Baal station =

Railway station in Baal, Germany

Hückelhoven-Baal
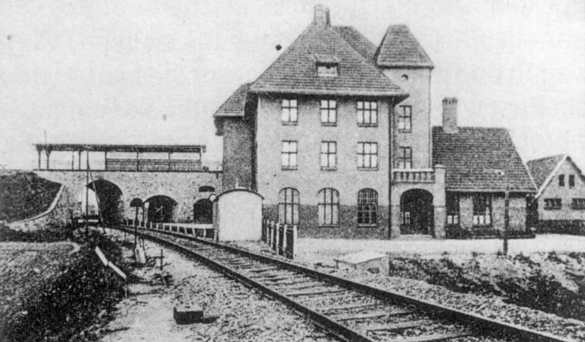
- Baal station in about 1912

General information
- Location: Bahnstr.11, Hückelhoven, NRW; Germany
- Coordinates: 51°01′59″N 6°16′26″E
- Lines: Aachen–Mönchengladbach; Jülich–Dalheim
- Platforms: 2

Construction
- Accessible: Yes

Other information
- Station code: 235
- DS100 code: KBA
- Category: 4
- Fare zone: AVV: 43; VRS: 3480 (AVV transitional tariff)
- Website: www.bahnhof.de

History
- Opened: 15 December 1911

Services
Preceding station	DB Regio NRW	Following station
Brachelen towards Aachen Hbf	RB 33	Erkelenz towards Essen-Steele
Preceding station	National Express Germany	Following station
Lindern towards Aachen Hbf	RE 4 (Wupper-Express)	Erkelenz towards Dortmund Hbf
Location

Hückelhoven-Baal station is in the Hückelhoven district of Baal in the German state of North Rhine-Westphalia on the Aachen–Mönchengladbach railway. It is classified by Deutsche Bahn as a category 5 station. With its construction as an interchange station on two levels, it became important as a hub for passenger services, but in recent years it has lost this significance due to the closure of the adjacent section of the Jülich–Dalheim railway. Meanwhile, the passenger station has been reclassified as a halt and it was renamed as Hückelhoven-Baal in 2002. Baal freight yard still exists.

== History ==
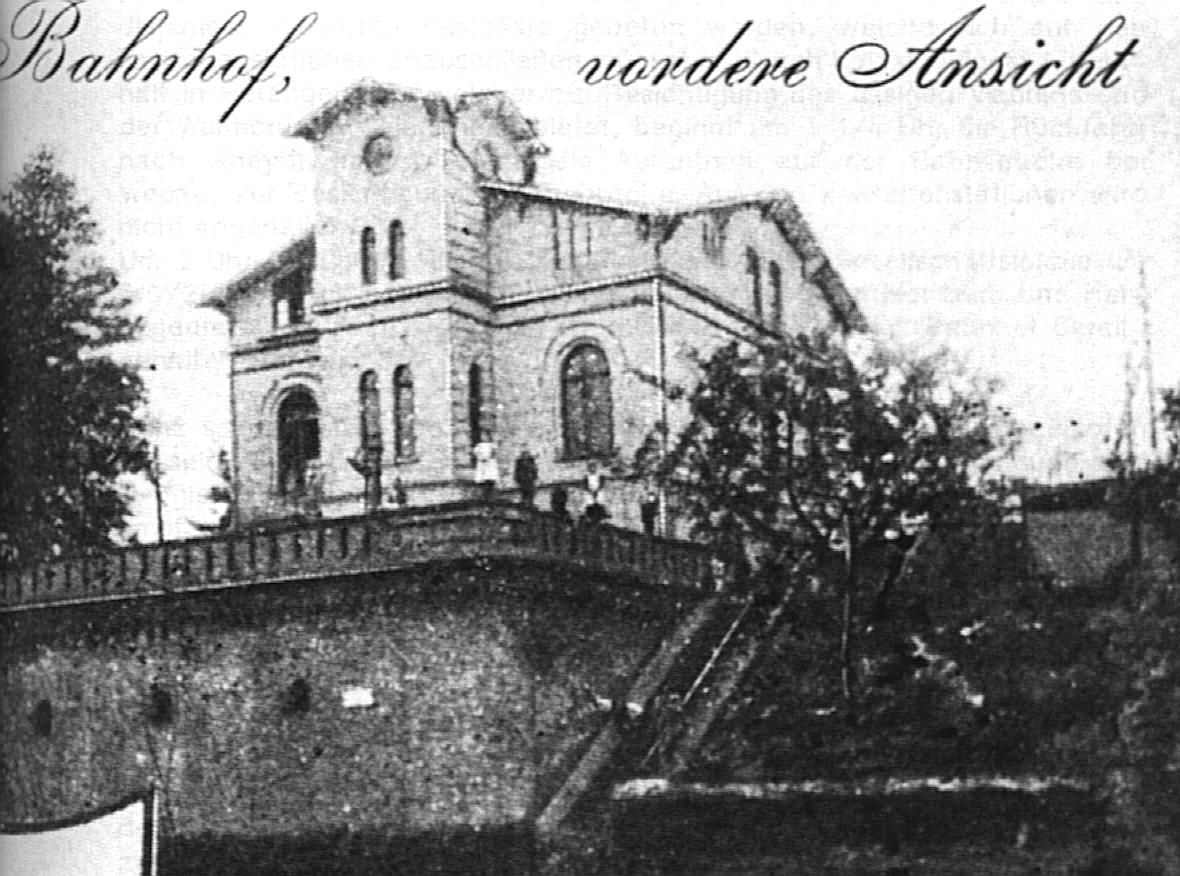
The old station in about 1900

In 1852, was the Aachen–Mönchengladbach line was opened by the former Aachen-Düsseldorf-Ruhrort Railway Company and Baal station was at the 41.6 kilometre point, serving passengers and freight. This station was equipped with an entrance building, a ramp for handling freight, a small turntable and a small transfer table.

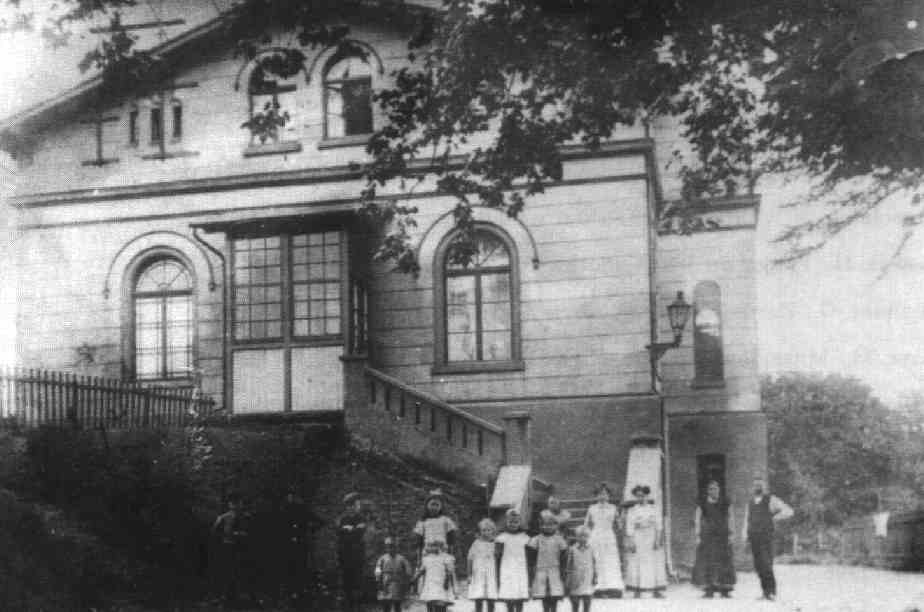
The old station

The station is still commemorated at its original location by the street named Am Alten Bahnhof (“At the Old Station”) and the retaining wall of its old foundations. Today the Baal freight yard is still located at the site of the old station, along with the dispatcher’s signal box and the junction to the connecting curve to Ratheim, which have not been used since 2007.

=== The tower station ===
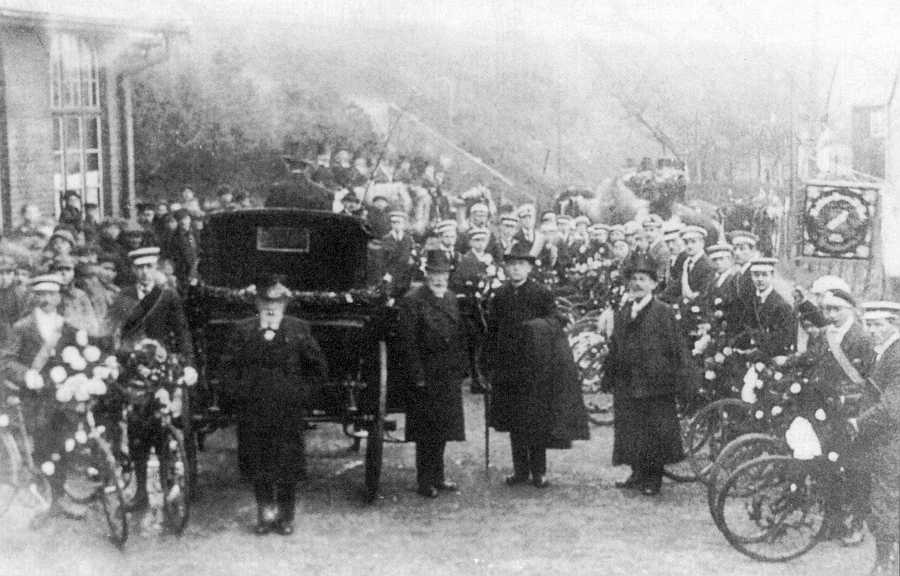
Opening ceremony for the line in Baal

In 1911, the passenger station was relocated to the west for the opening of the Julich–Dalheim railway. In order to serve the two railways, a “tower station” (Turmbahnhof, that is a station with superimposed platforms on two levels) was built. The line to Dalheim was connected directly by a link at Baal freight yard/Baal West to the Aachen–Mönchengladbach line, which was especially important for freight from the Sophia-Jacoba colliery.

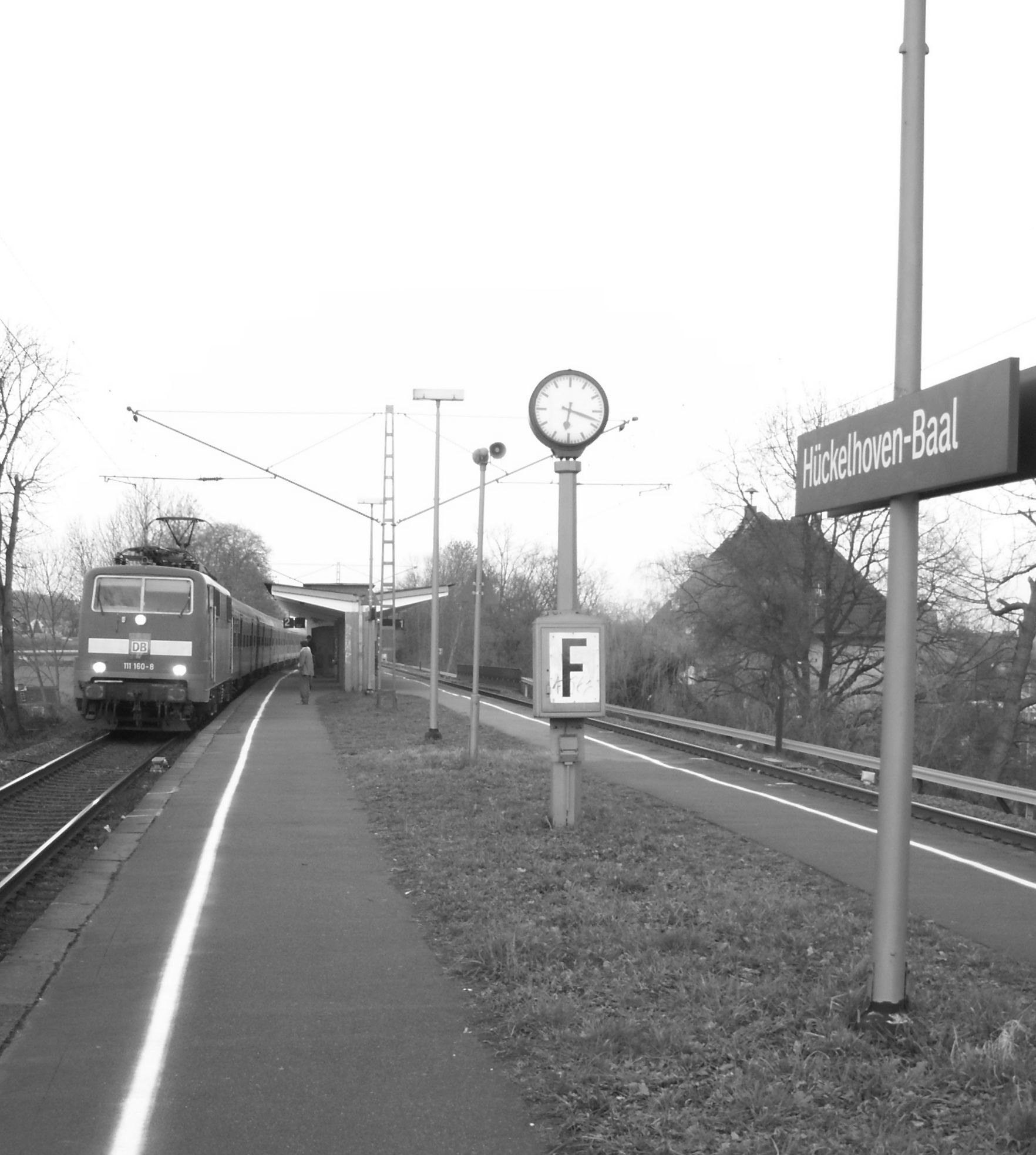
Regional train at Hückelhoven-Baal station (former upper station)

Passenger services between Jülich and Baal were thinned out in the 1960s so that only a few trains remained in the timetable among the many bus services. In addition car-ownership was growing. The consequent decline in ridership prompted Deutsche Bundesbahn to close passenger services between Jülich and Baal on 29 September 1968; freight traffic on this section ended on 28 May 1972. The dismantling of the tracks between Baal and Linnich began in 1974.

The still open line between Baal and Dalheim was initially relatively well used by the population because of the so-called "round service" (Rundverkehr) on the Mönchengladbach–Rheydt–Rheindahlen–Wegberg–Dalheim–Wassenberg–Ratheim–Hückelhoven–Baal (West)–Erkelenz–Rheydt–Mönchengladbach route.

However, in the 1970s, the timetable was thinned to a few trains a day on the northern section from Baal to Dalheim. Eventually the service was abolished and replaced by buses operated by Deutsche Bundesbahn on a route running parallel to the old rail service and the last passenger train ran with a wreath provided by the town of Baal towards Dalheim and Mönchengladbach on 27 September 1980.

== Infrastructure ==
Located at the site of the former tower station there is now only a simple station. The entry signal to the freight yard from the direction of Aachen is located a few metres behind the platform. The station, which is located in the zone of the Aachener Verkehrsverbund (Aachen Transport Association), is used by about 2,000 passengers per day. Because Baal had become part of the municipality of Hückelhoven in 1972, it renamed Hückelhoven-Baal station in 2002. The station needs repairs and is to be rebuilt by the town (including the reactivation of the lift).

On the site of the former low-level station there is a bus top with two bays, which still has a sign with the name of Baal Bahnhof (Baal station), and a parking area.

== Rail services ==
The station is served by the following services:

Line	Line name	Route
RE 4	Wupper-Express	Aachen Hbf – Herzogenrath – Hückelhoven-Baal – Erkelenz – Rheydt Hbf – Mönchengladbach Hbf – Düsseldorf Hbf – Wuppertal Hbf – Hagen Hbf – Witten Hbf – Dortmund Hbf
RB 33	Rhein-Niers-Bahn	Aachen Hbf – Herzogenrath – Hückelhoven-Baal – Rheydt Hbf – Mönchengladbach Hbf – Viersen – Krefeld Hbf – Rheinhausen – Duisburg Hbf – Mülheim – Essen

== Freight ==
Until 2007, the freight yard was an important traffic hub despite the closure of the Sophia-Jacoba colliery on 27 March 1997. It continued to be used by Deutsche Bahn coal trains on Mondays and Wednesdays between Baal freight yard and the Ratheim mine train station because SJ-Brikett- und Extracitfabrik GmbH continued to produce briquettes from anthracite at the old colliery site in Hückelhoven. Following the closure of the briquette factory in September 2007, the line between Baal and Ratheim was closed on 1 October 2007. Since then the freight yard has only been used to allow overtaking.
