= Düsseldorf-Friedrichstadt station =

Railway station in Germany

Düsseldorf Friedrichstadt
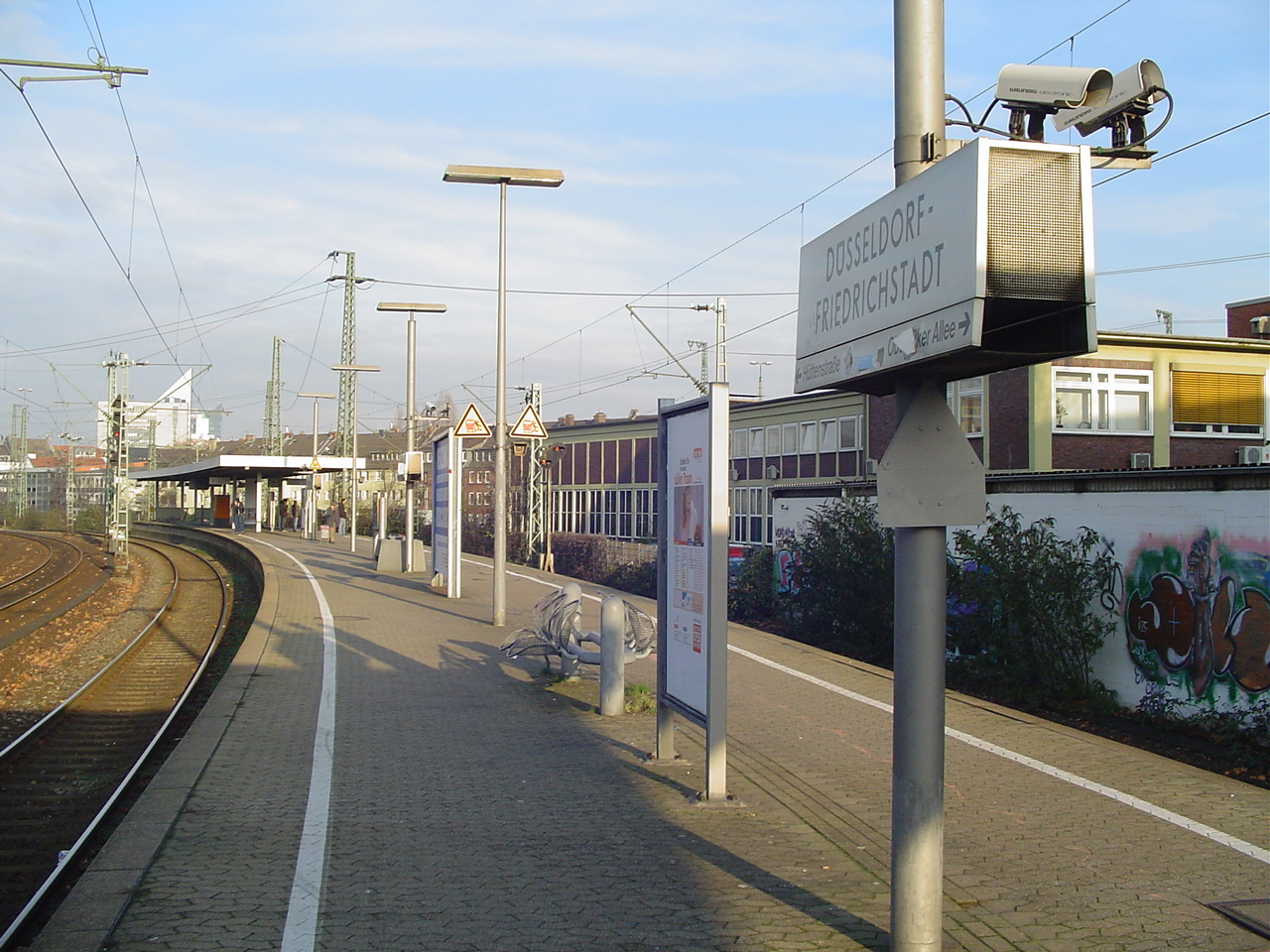

General information
- Location: Oberbilker Allee 76; Friedrichstadt, Düsseldorf, NRW; Germany
- Coordinates: 51°12′43″N 6°47′21″E
- Lines: Düsseldorf–Mönchengladbach (KBS 450.8)
- Platforms: 2

Construction
- Accessible: No

Other information
- Station code: 14115
- DS100 code: KDFS
- IBNR: 8001579
- Category: 5
- Fare zone: VRR: 430; VRS: 1430 (VRR transitional zone)
- Website: www.bahnhof.de

History
- Opened: 29 May 1988

Services
Preceding station	Rhine-Ruhr S-Bahn	Following station
Düsseldorf-Bilk towards Mönchengladbach Hbf	S8	Düsseldorf Hbf towards Hagen Hbf
Düsseldorf-Bilk towards Kaarster See	S28	Düsseldorf Hbf towards Wuppertal Hbf
Preceding station	Cologne S-Bahn	Following station
Düsseldorf-Bilk towards Bergisch Gladbach	S11	Düsseldorf Hbf towards Düsseldorf Airport Terminal
Location

Düsseldorf-Friedrichstadt station is a through station in the district of Friedrichstadt in the city of Düsseldorf in the German state of North Rhine-Westphalia. The station was opened on 29 May 1988 on the new line opened by the Prussian state railways on 1 October 1891 between the Hamm Railway Bridge and Gerresheim as part of the construction of Düsseldorf Hauptbahnhof. It has two platform tracks and it is classified by Deutsche Bahn as a category 5 station.

The station is served by S-Bahn lines S8 between Mönchengladbach and Wuppertal-Oberbarmen or Hagen, S11 between Düsseldorf Airport and Bergisch Gladbach and S28 between Mettmann Stadtwald or Wuppertal and Kaarster See, each every 20 minutes.
