= Rhein Ruhr Express =

Public transit system in North Rhine-Westphalia

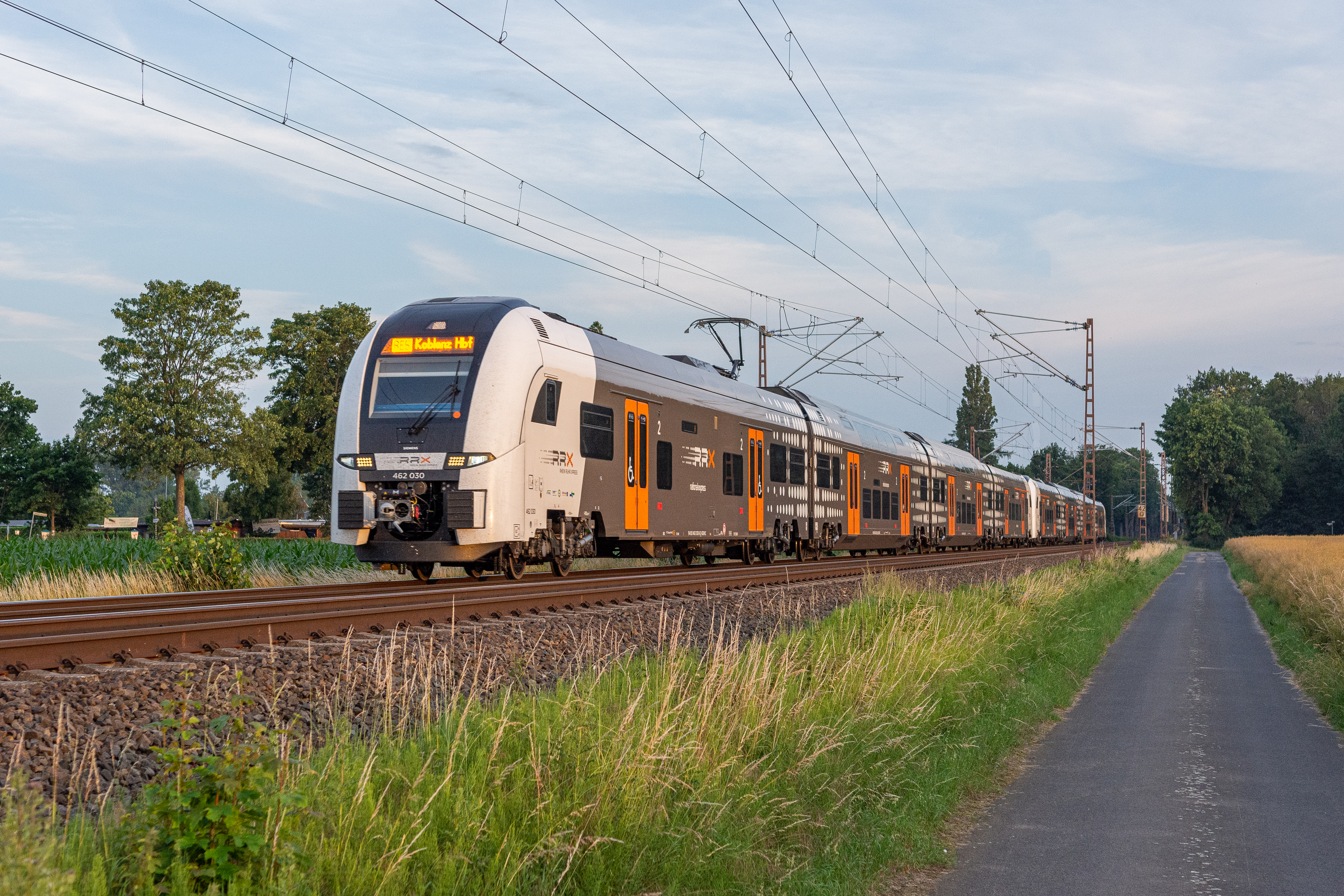
- Two RRX Siemens Desiro HC trainsets operate in the morning near Haldern as RE5 to Koblenz.

Overview
- Area served: Rhine-Ruhr metropolitan region
- Transit type: Regional rail
- Number of lines: 5
- Website: rrx.de

Operation
- Began operation: 9 December 2018; 7 years ago
- Operator: National Express Germany
- Number of vehicles: 84 Siemens Desiro HC
- Headway: Every 15 minutes on the main section

Technical
- Track gauge: 1,435 mm (4 ft 8 1/2 in) standard gauge
- Top speed: 160 km/h (99 mph)

Rhein Ruhr Express (branded as Rhein Ruhr Xpress or RRX) is a regional rail system in the Rhine-Ruhr metropolitan region of Germany connecting the Ruhr Valley and the central Rhineland. The primary goal is to provide a fast connection on the main trunk line between Dortmund and Cologne, located along the Ruhr Valley, with trains every quarter of an hour. This main line has been expanded, improved or reconfigured to enable more trains to operate and at higher speeds. Like the previous Regional-Express lines they replaced, RRX routes branch off from the main trunk line to serve other cities and states at lower frequencies.

For the project, 84 Siemens Desiro HC trainsets were purchased, which have higher capacity and acceleration, enabling increased punctuality. Operation of the first RRX line started in December of 2018, while five lines operate as of 2023. The construction is planned to be finished by 2030 and the project is expected to replace 24,000 automobile trips per day when finished.

== Current routes ==
There are four currently operating RRX routes that use the main trunk line:

- RE 1 (NRW-Express) Aachen – Cologne – Düsseldorf – Essen – Dortmund – Hamm
- RE 5 (Rhein-Express) Koblenz – Bonn – Cologne – Düsseldorf – Duisburg – Oberhausen – Wesel
- RE 6 (Rhein-Weser-Express) Cologne/Bonn Airport – Cologne – Düsseldorf – Essen – Dortmund – Hamm – Bielefeld – Minden
- RE 11 (Rhein-Hellweg-Express) Düsseldorf – Essen – Dortmund – Hamm – Paderborn – Kassel

Additionally, there is one route that is operated with RRX branded equipment, but does not use the main trunk line:

- RE 4 (Wupper-Express) Aachen –Mönchengladbach – Düsseldorf – Wuppertal – Hagen – Dortmund

== Planned routes ==
Currently in 2023 there are seven planned lines that will all operate once per hour each, but the planning is not finished as some passenger estimates from 2006 were already exceeded in 2015. On the central section from Dortmund via Bochum, Essen, Mülheim a.d. Ruhr and Düsseldorf to Cologne four of the lines will provide an interlined service every quarter of an hour and continue on from there to the following cities:

- RRX 2 Dortmund – Hamm – Paderborn – Kassel-Wilhelmshöhe
- RRX 4 Dortmund – Hamm – Bielefeld
- RRX 6 Dortmund – Hamm – Bielefeld – Minden
- RRX 1/RRX 2 Köln – Aachen (half-hourly)
- RRX 4/RRX 6 Köln – Bonn – Koblenz (half-hourly)

The other three lines serve part of the central section, but either use parallel routes or branch off to serve the wider region. All the lines continue outwards from the central section to connect to more cities or even neighboring states. The full planned lines are:

- RRX 1 Dortmund – Bochum – Bochum-Wattenscheid – Essen – Duisburg – Düsseldorf-Flughafen – Düsseldorf – Düsseldorf-Benrath – Leverkusen – Köln-Messe/Deutz – Köln – Köln-Ehrenfeld – Horrem – Düren – Langerwehe – Eschweiler – Stolberg – Aachen-Rothe Erde – Aachen
- RRX 2 Kassel-Wilhelmshöhe – Hofgeismar – Warburg – Willebadessen – Altenbeken – Paderborn – Lippstadt – Soest – Hamm – Kamen – Dortmund – Bochum – Bochum-Wattenscheid – Essen – Duisburg – Düsseldorf-Flughafen – Düsseldorf – Düsseldorf-Benrath – Leverkusen – Köln-Mülheim – Köln-Messe/Deutz – Köln – Köln-Ehrenfeld – Horrem – Düren – Langerwehe – Eschweiler – Stolberg – Aachen-Rothe Erde – Aachen
- RRX 3 Münster – Dortmund – Dortmund-Mengede – Castrop-Rauxel – Herne – Herne-Wanne-Eickel – Gelsenkirchen – Essen-Altenessen – Oberhausen – Duisburg – Düsseldorf-Flughafen – Düsseldorf – Neuss – Dormagen – Köln – Köln-Messe/Deutz – Köln/Bonn Flughafen
- RRX 4 Bielefeld – Bielefeld-Brackwede – Isselhorst-Avenwedde – Gütersloh – Rheda-Wiedenbrück – Oelde – Neubeckum – Ahlen – Hamm-Heessen – Hamm – Kamen – Dortmund – Bochum – Essen – Mülheim – Duisburg – Düsseldorf-Flughafen – Düsseldorf – Düsseldorf-Benrath – Leverkusen – Köln-Mülheim – Köln-Messe/Deutz – Köln – Köln Süd – Brühl – Sechtem – Roisdorf – Bonn – Bonn UN Campus – Bonn-Bad Godesberg – Bonn-Mehlem – Oberwinter – Remagen – Sinzig – Bad Breisig – Brohl – Namedy – Andernach – Weißenthurm – Mülheim-Kärlich – Koblenz-Lützel – Koblenz-Stadtmitte – Koblenz
- RRX 5 Wesel – Dinslaken – Oberhausen-Sterkrade – Oberhausen – Duisburg – Düsseldorf-Flughafen – Düsseldorf
- RRX 6 Minden – Porta Westfalica – Bad Oeynhausen – Löhne – Herford – Bielefeld – Gütersloh – Rheda-Wiedenbrück – Oelde – Neubeckum – Ahlen – Hamm-Heessen –Hamm – Kamen – Dortmund – Bochum – Essen – Mülheim – Duisburg – Düsseldorf-Flughafen – Düsseldorf – Düsseldorf-Benrath – Leverkusen – Köln-Mülheim – Köln Messe/Deutz – Köln – Köln Süd – Brühl – Bonn – Bonn UN Campus – Bonn-Bad Godesberg – Remagen – Sinzig – Bad Breisig – Andernach – Koblenz-Stadtmitte – Koblenz
- RRX 7 Osnabrück – Lengerich – Münster – Dülmen – Haltern – Recklinghausen – Herne-Wanne-Eickel – Gelsenkirchen – Essen – Mülheim – Duisburg – Düsseldorf-Flughafen – Düsseldorf

== Infrastructure works ==
To create the needed capacity for the additional trains running through the highly congested Rhein-Ruhr area new and improved infrastructure is planned along nearly every part of the route. This includes additional tracks and platforms as well as new connections and flyovers between tracks and improved signalling. The project is divided into 6 different sections (Planfeststellungsabschnitte or PFA) that are also divided into smaller sub-sections with different kinds of works necessary:

=== Cologne - Düsseldorf Benrath (PFA 1) ===
In the first section more capacity is provided by moving freight trains from the tracks used by the RRX to the tracks of the S-Bahn. For this the S-Bahn was double tracked on the entire route in the summer of 2023 and was given a larger distance between the two tracks. In Leverkusen the side platform was modified to be an island platform for which the former building of the station had to be demolished. Work in this section is already finished or nearing completion, with only small works left to finish in 2024.

=== Düsseldorf Benrath - Düsseldorf Wehrhahn (PFA 2) ===
Between Düsseldorf and Duisburg the RRX will run on two completely separate tracks. In this section two new tracks will have to be built in the southern parts while in the parts further to the north two S-Bahn lines will be put on the same tracks freeing the former S-Bahn tracks for use by the RRX. In Düsseldorf main station a new platform will also be built to accommodate the additional trains running through it. None of these parts have started construction yet.

=== Düsseldorf Wehrhahn - Duisburg (PFA 3) ===
The RRX will run on its own tracks up until Duisburg main station where it merges with the other rail traffic again, for which the entire line between the two cities will be expanded to six tracks. At Düsseldorf Airport its station will be expanded with two additional tracks and platforms as the airport is the third largest in Germany by passenger numbers and is therefore served by the trains. In the southern approach to Duisburg main station new flyovers will be built to increase the capacity. No construction work has happened yet in section 3 as well.

The part between Duisburg main station and the border to Mülheim a. d. Ruhr is included in planning section 3, but doesn't feature exclusive tracks for the RRX. In this section only minimal changes will be made to the rail line.

=== Mülheim a. d. Ruhr (PFA 4) ===
In the entire section in Mülheim only a few new track switches were installed and new interlocking technology was installed. This is the only section where all works are already finished, as there are so few of them.

=== Essen - Bochum (PFA 5) ===
In Essen and Bochum two regional rail lines, RE 16 and RB 40, will be moved to the S-Bahn tracks and shorter distances between signals will be used to increase train capacity on the non-S-Bahn tracks. Both parts of this section already have building permits, but actual work hasn't started yet.

=== Dortmund (PFA 6) ===
The planning of the infrastructure in Dortmund was influenced by the Deutschlandtakt so much, that large parts of it will have to be redone. Because of this, no plans have been made public yet.

== Rolling stock ==
In contrast to most regional rail systems in Germany, the state of NRW tendered the trains to be used separately from the operator. The vehicles were then leased for 15 years to the chosen operator. This enabled more competition, as the different operators didn't need to invest into the rolling stock on their own. After a study conducted in 2011 showed that double deck trains were suitable to be used and even preferable to single deck variants due to their higher capacity and being shorter, these were selected for operation on the network. The other requirements were a top speed of at least 160 km/h (100 mph), a minimum acceleration of 1.0 m/s², multiple-unit support, being bi-directional, the standard door height of 76 cm (30 in) and an existing license by the regulators. There were three bidders for the contract, which the Siemens Desiro HC won. Subsequently, 84 trains of the type were manufactured and delivered from 2018 to 2020 for 800 million Euro. While earlier sources mention 82 trains being built, more recent ones state 84. The contract also includes maintenance of the trains for 32 years raising the total volume to 1.7 billion Euro.

Additionally to the mentioned requirements of the tender the trains feature free Wi-Fi, air conditioning, power outlets, reading lamps and folding tables at the seats and new windows that allow internet signals to pass through uninterrupted leading to a much better experience when using the internet during the train ride. This is the first time this technology has been used in a series-production train according to Siemens. As two trains are always used in a pair they have a total of 800 seats per train set, and the door areas and doors itself are large to accommodate the many passengers. The trains have a low noise-level inside and in addition to level boarding have wheelchair accessible areas that can also be used for bicycles and an accessible toilet. Each train is 105 m (344 ft) long, forming train sets 210 m (690 ft) long, with a powered single-deck car on each ends and two non-powered double-deck cars in the middle. The trains have triple-unit traction capabilities, but these are not planned to be used.

Maintenance of the trains is done in a new fully digital maintenance facility in Dortmund-Eving that was opened in September of 2018, and both the trains and the service facilities are equipped with digital technology to enable preventative maintenance. According to the manufacturer the vehicles achieve an availability rate of over 99%. The maintenance facility also features exterior and interior cleaning facilities.

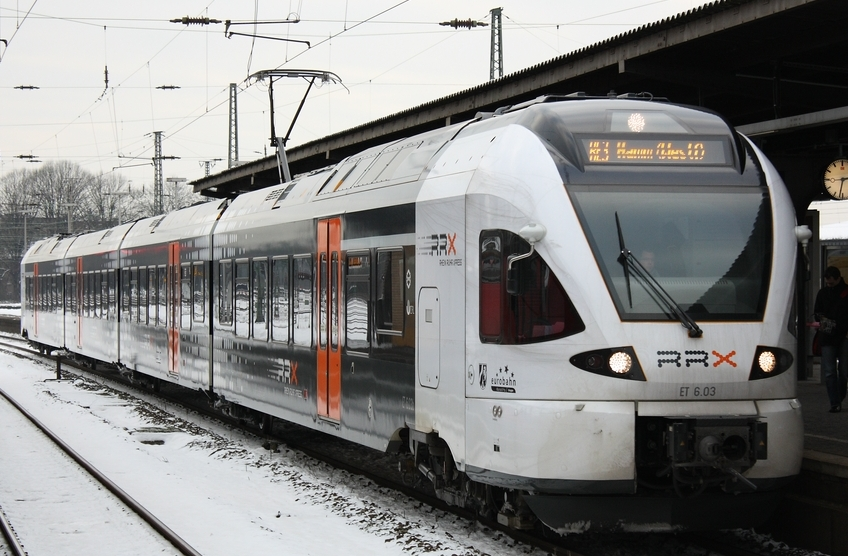
Stadler FLIRT of Eurobahn in RRX livery

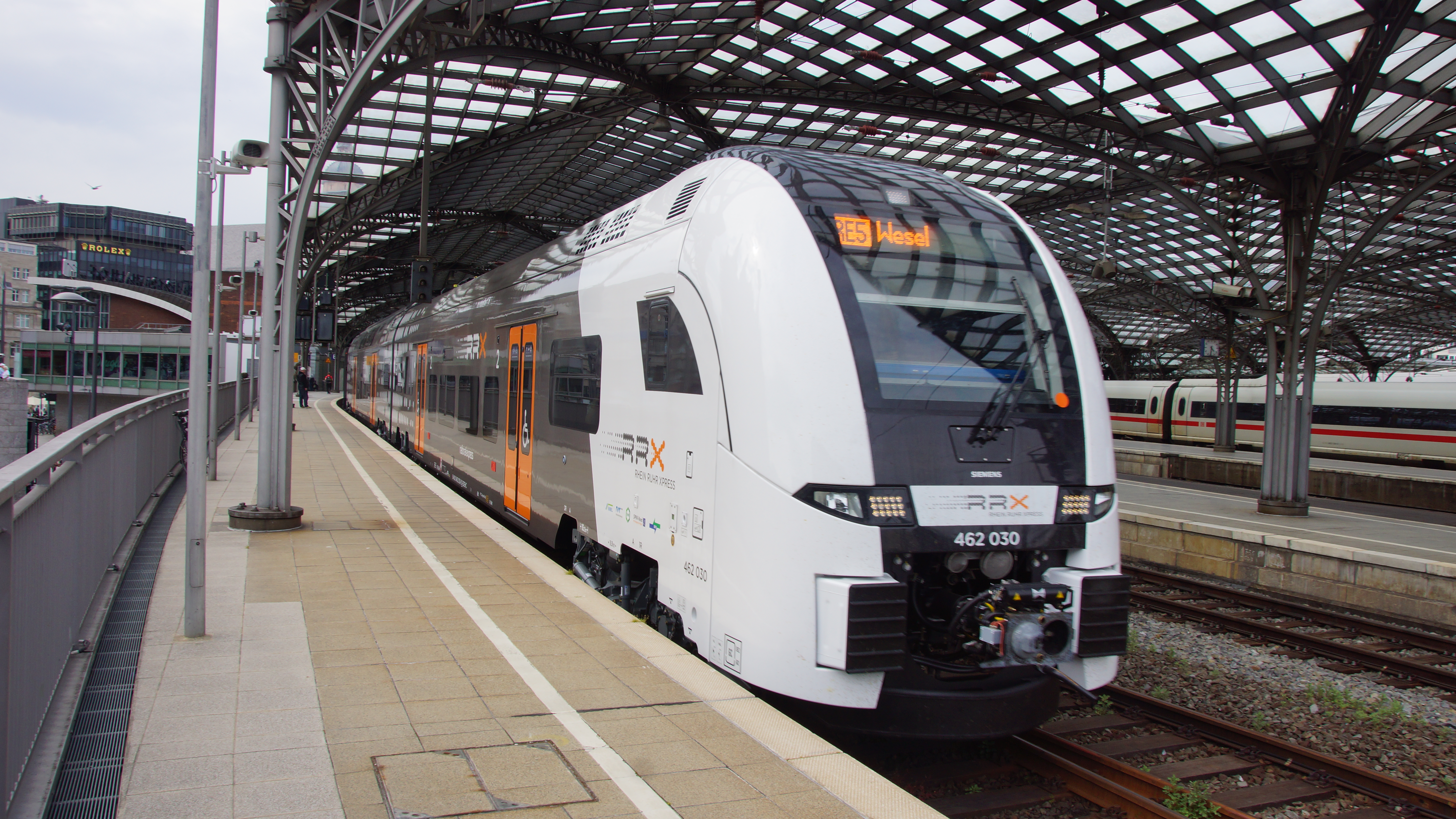
RRX 462 030 in Köln Hauptbahnhof

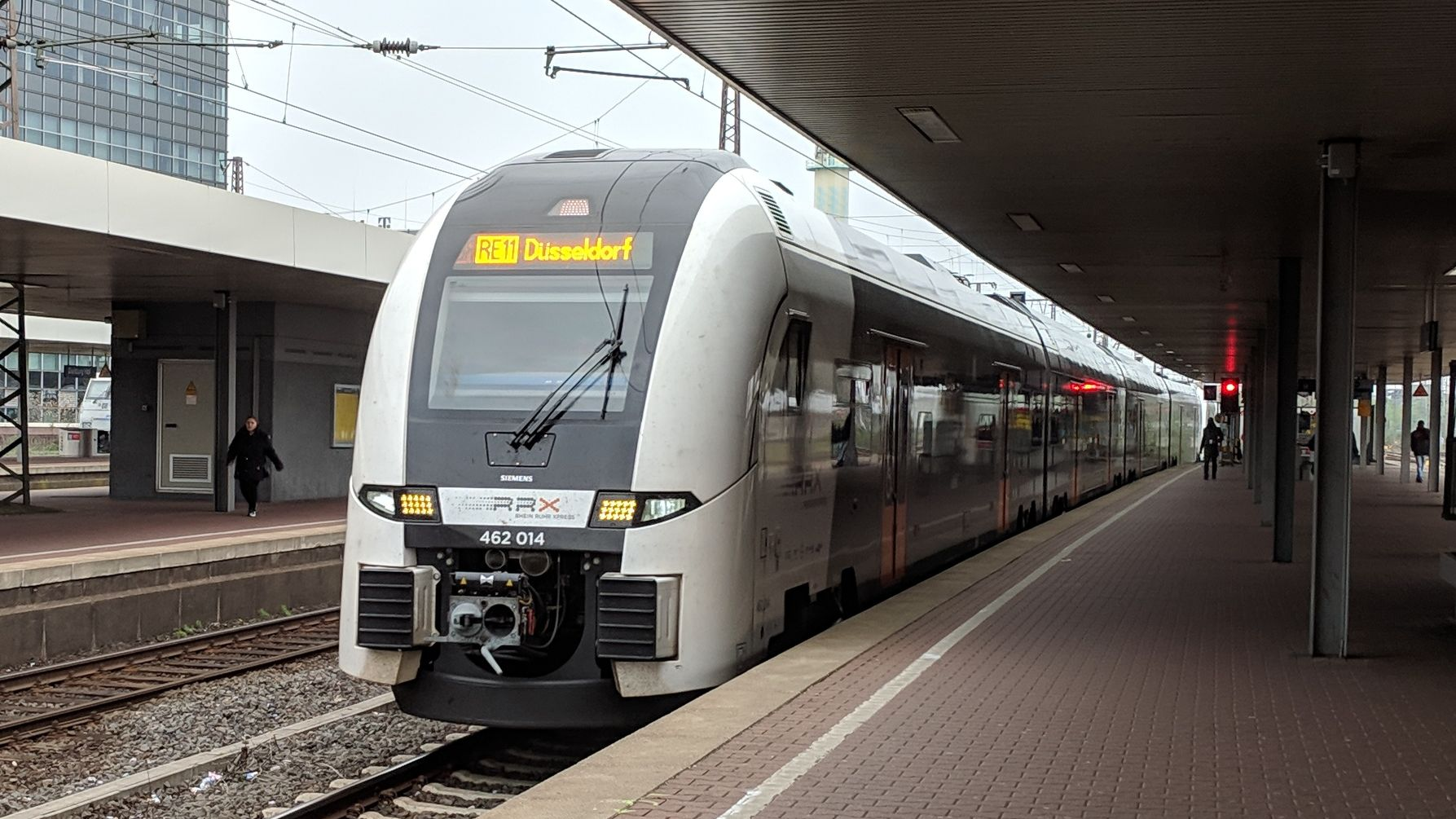
RRX 462 014 in Duisburg Hauptbahnhof.

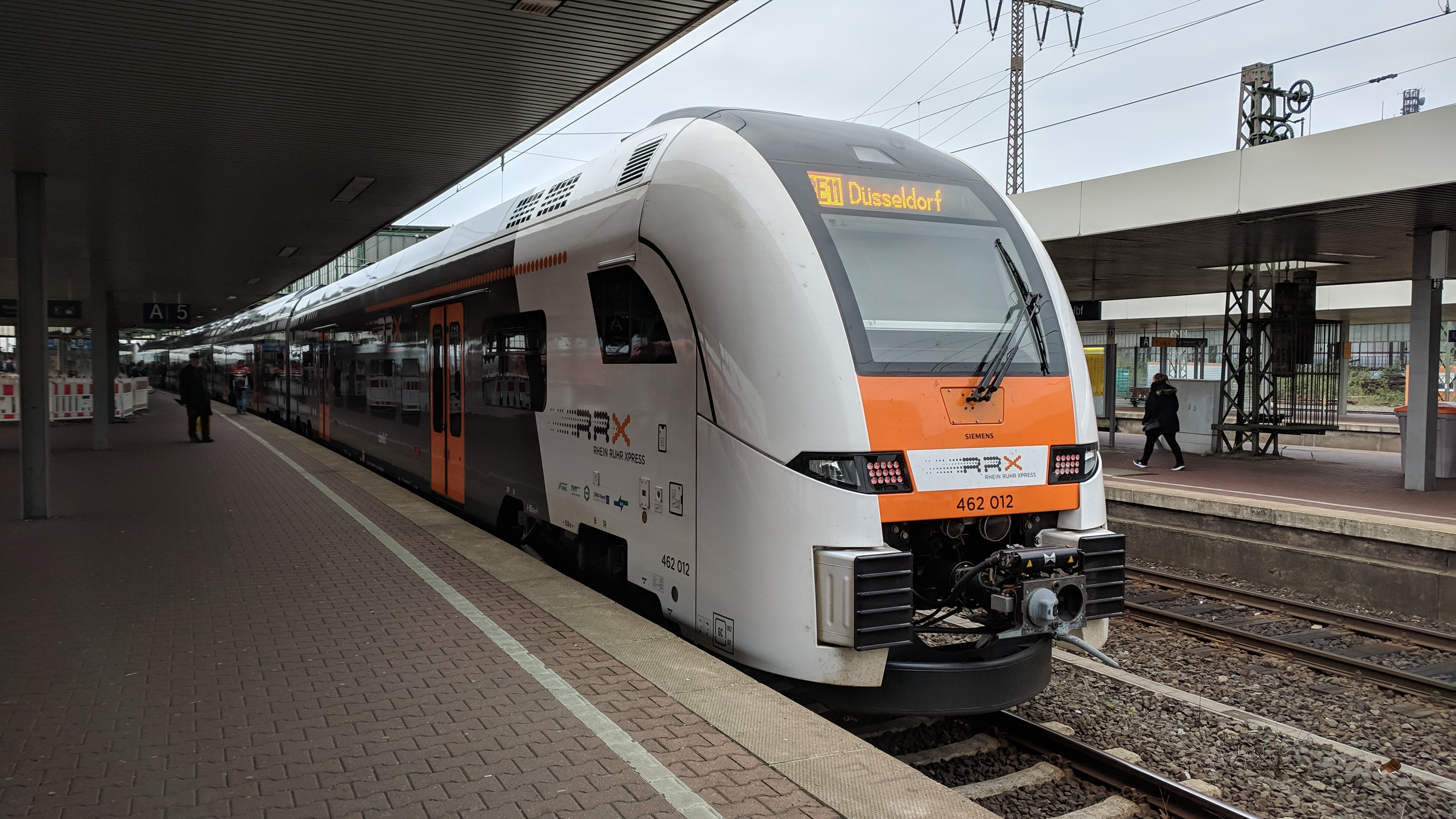
RRX 462 012 in Duisburg Hauptbahnhof.
