= Düsseldorf-Hamm station =

Railway station in Düsseldorf, Germany

Düsseldorf Hamm
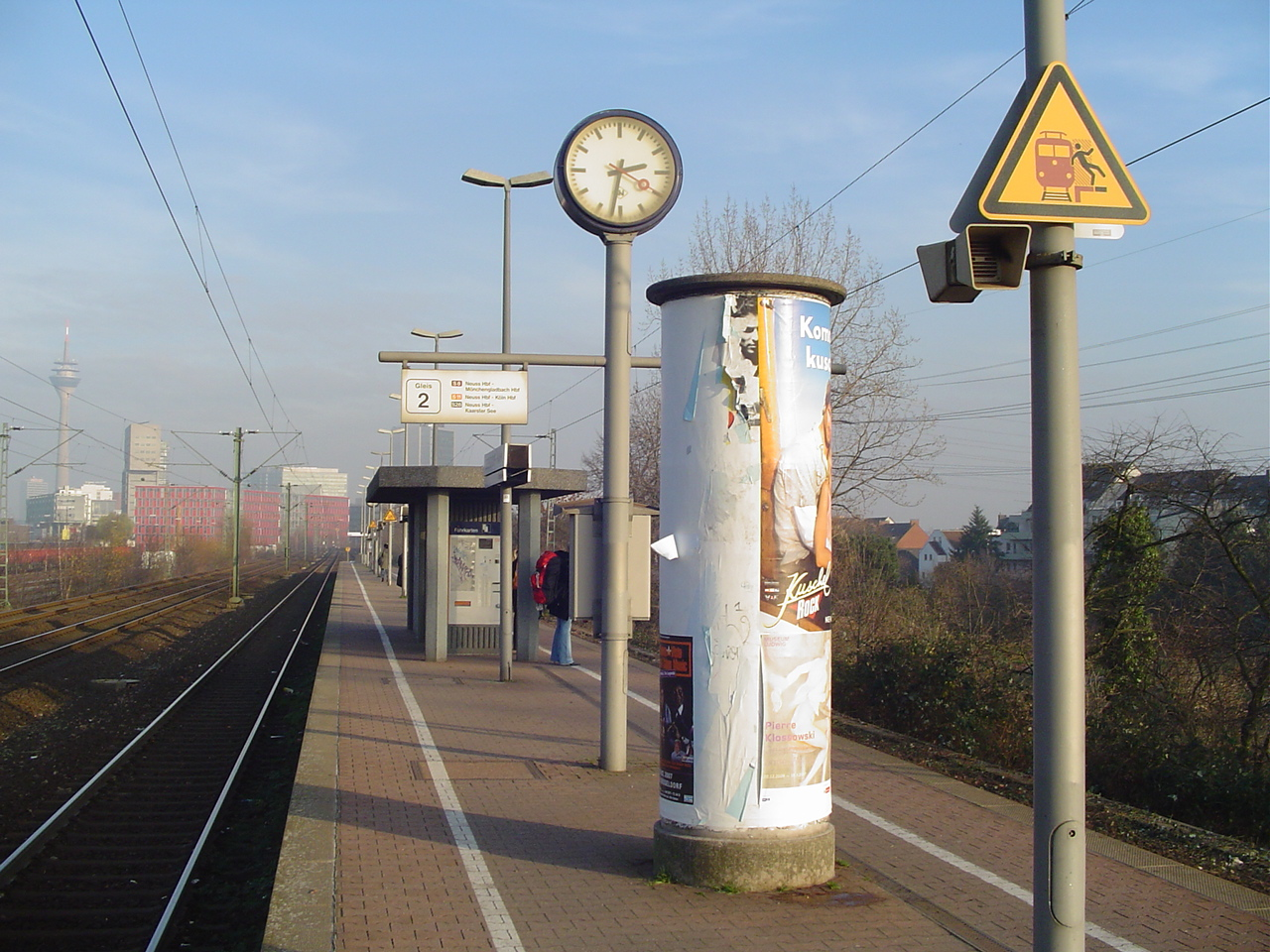

General information
- Location: Kuhstr. 29, Düsseldorf, NRW; Germany
- Coordinates: 51°12′37″N 6°44′22″E
- Lines: Mönchengladbach–Düsseldorf (KBS 450.8)
- Platforms: 2

Construction
- Accessible: No

Other information
- Station code: 1414
- DS100 code: KDHA
- IBNR: 8001597
- Category: 5
- Fare zone: VRR: 430; VRS: 1430 (VRR transitional tariff)
- Website: www.bahnhof.de

History
- Opened: 29 May 1988

Services
Preceding station	Rhine-Ruhr S-Bahn	Following station
Neuss Rheinparkcenter towards Mönchengladbach Hbf	S8	Düsseldorf Völklinger Straße towards Hagen Hbf
Neuss Rheinparkcenter towards Kaarster See	S28	Düsseldorf Völklinger Straße towards Wuppertal Hbf
Preceding station	Cologne S-Bahn	Following station
Neuss Rheinparkcenter towards Bergisch Gladbach	S11	Düsseldorf Völklinger Straße towards Düsseldorf Airport Terminal
Location

Düsseldorf-Hamm station is about 5 kilometres southwest of Düsseldorf Hauptbahnhof in the Düsseldorf district of Hamm in the German state of North Rhine-Westphalia. It is on the Mönchengladbach–Düsseldorf railway and it is classified by Deutsche Bahn as a category 5 station. The station opened on 29 May 1988. Apart from Rhine-Ruhr S-Bahn services it is served by a tram line and a bus line.

== Station ==
The station is located between the districts of Hamm and Unterbilk. It has an island platform and is located in an elevated position above Kuhstraße, where its entrance is located.

== Rail services ==
The station is served by line S 8 (running between Hagen and Mönchengladbach), line S 11 (running between Düsseldorf Airport and Bergisch Gladbach) and line S 28 (running between Mettmann Stadtwald or Wuppertal and Kaarster See), each operating every 20 minutes during the day.

It is also served by tram line 706 (towards Am Steinberg via city Düsseldorf center, north and returning to south), operated at around 10 minutes intervals and bus route 732 (Vennhauser Allee - Lausward, both directions), operated at around 20 minutes intervals, both by Rheinbahn.
