= Neuss Rheinpark-Center station =

Railway station in Germany

Neuss Rheinpark-Center
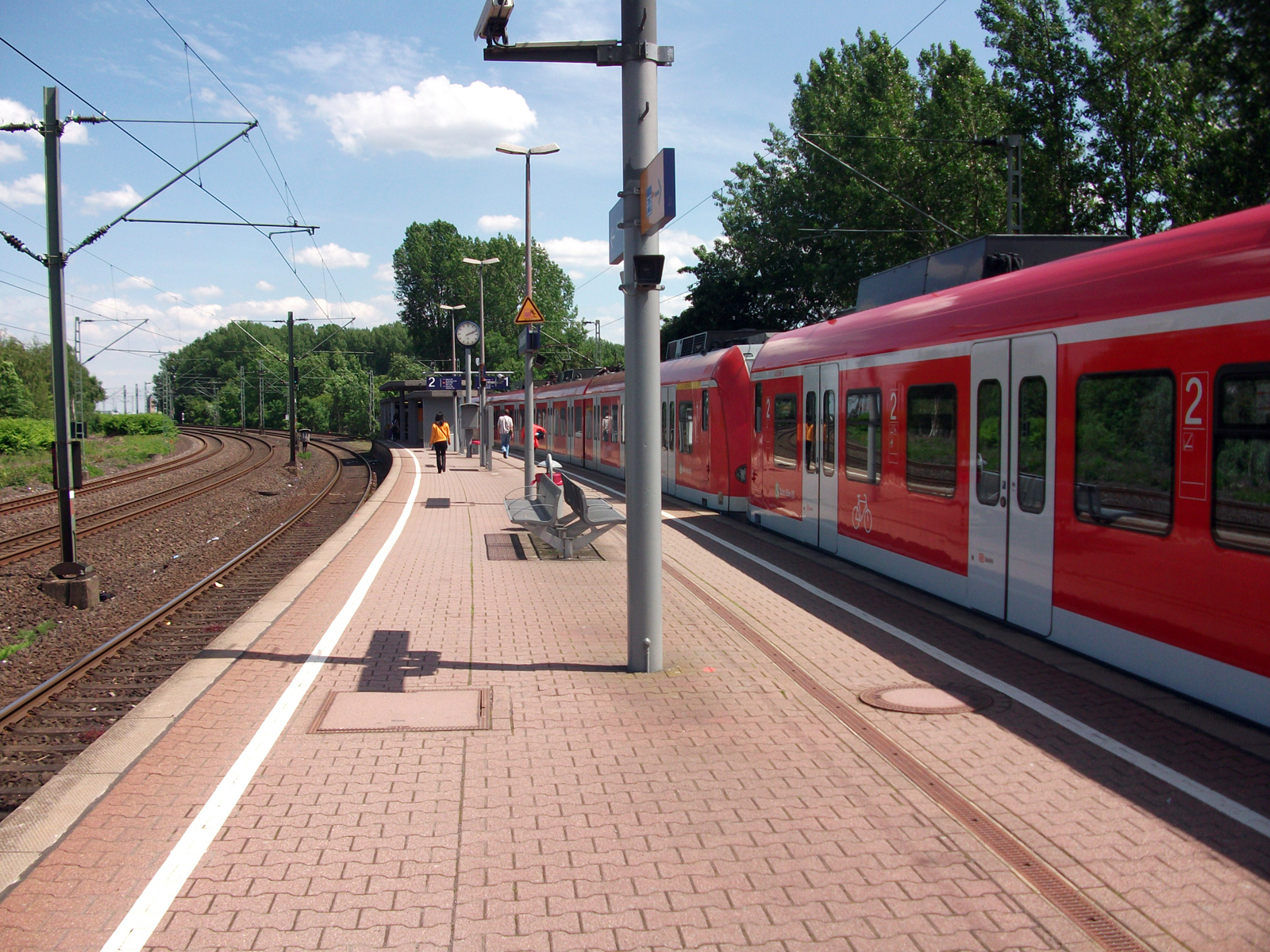

General information
- Location: An der Hammer Brücke 1 Neuss, NRW; Germany
- Coordinates: 51°12′21″N 6°43′04″E
- Lines: Mönchengladbach–Düsseldorf (KBS 450.8)
- Platforms: 2

Construction
- Accessible: No

Other information
- Station code: 4441
- DS100 code: KNRC
- IBNR: 8004316
- Category: 5
- Fare zone: VRR: 521; VRS: 1520 (VRR transitional tariff)
- Website: www.bahnhof.de

History
- Opened: 29 May 1988

Services
Preceding station	Rhine-Ruhr S-Bahn	Following station
Neuss Am Kaiser towards Mönchengladbach Hbf	S8	Düsseldorf-Hamm towards Hagen Hbf
Neuss Am Kaiser towards Kaarster See	S28	Düsseldorf-Hamm towards Wuppertal Hbf
Preceding station	Cologne S-Bahn	Following station
Neuss Am Kaiser towards Bergisch Gladbach	S11	Düsseldorf-Hamm towards Düsseldorf Airport Terminal
Location

Neuss Rheinpark-Center station is in the city of Neuss in the German state of North Rhine-Westphalia. It is located in the Neuss Rheinpark Center business park and shopping centre. It is on the Mönchengladbach–Düsseldorf railway and it is classified by Deutsche Bahn as a category 5 station. The station opened on 29 May 1988 on the new line built with the Hamm railway bridge opened by the Bergisch-Märkische Railway Company on 24 July 1870.

The station is served by three S-Bahn lines: S 8 (running between Hagen and Mönchengladbach), S 11 (running between Düsseldorf Airport and Bergisch Gladbach) and S 28 (running between Mettmann Stadtwald or Wuppertal and Kaarster See), each operating every 20 minutes during the day.

It is also served by bus route 842, operated by Stadtwerke Neuss at 20-minute intervals, and by bus route 874, operated by Busverkehr Rheinland at 60 to 180-minute intervals.
