= Wupper-Express =

Regional train service in the Rhine-Ruhr region of Germany

RE 4 Wupper-Express

Overview
- Locale: North Rhine-Westphalia, Germany

Service
- System: Rhein-Ruhr-Express (RRX)
- Route number: 485 (Aachen–Hagen); 427 (Hagen–Dortmund)
- Operator(s): National Express Germany

Technical
- Line length: 171 km (106 mi)
- Track gauge: 1,435 mm (4 ft 8 1/2 in) standard gauge
- Electrification: Overhead line, 15 kV 16.7 Hz AC
- Operating speed: 160 km/h (99 mph) (maximum)

The Wupper-Express (RE 4) is a Regional-Express service in the German state of North Rhine-Westphalia (NRW) running between Aachen and Dortmund via Mönchengladbach, Düsseldorf, Wuppertal and Hagen. It is the third most widely used Regional-Express line in the area administered by the Verkehrsverbund Rhein-Ruhr (VRR) with approximately 24,000 passengers a day. The line is part of the Rhein-Ruhr-Express (RRX) network and is operated by National Express Germany.

== History ==
Today's RE 4 is the successor to the former StädteExpress line SE from Aachen to Hagen and Iserlohn. Later, the end point was moved to Hamm and after the abolition of InterRegio services it was extended to Munster. Under the second stage of North Rhine-Westphalia's integrated timetable (ITF 2), introduced in December 2002, it was replaced by the Maas-Wupper-Express (RE 13) and the Ems-Börde-Bahn (RB 89) services between Hagen and Munster and the Wupper-Express has since then run to Dortmund with a stop in Witten.

A reorganisation of services between Cologne and Dortmund is being undertaken in a program known as the Rhine-Ruhr Express (RRX). Since 18 March 2022, the Wupper-Express has also stopped in Düsseldorf-Bilk with the completion of the new regional platform.

== Route ==
The Wupper-Express runs successively over the Aachen–Mönchengladbach, the Mönchengladbach–Düsseldorf and the Düsseldorf–Elberfeld lines. The service then follows the Elberfeld–Dortmund railway as far as Witten station, from where it uses the tracks of the Witten/Dortmund–Oberhausen/Duisburg railway and the Oberstraße Tunnel on its way to Dortmund station. At night, the RE 4 operates to Düsseldorf Airport Terminal station.

The Wupper-Express runs parallel to Rhine-Ruhr S-Bahn lines on large sections of track and it has some of the character of a fast S-Bahn service and is perceived by passengers accordingly.

== Rollingstock ==
The Wupper-Express formerly used class 111 locomotives and non-air conditioned double-deck coaches. Additional peak hour services operated between Düsseldorf and Aachen with class 110 and 111 locomotives, operated exclusively with refurbished Silberling carriages.

Since December 2020, the line has been operated by National Express with new Siemens Desiro HC EMU's in coupled sets, which serve as a reserve for possible expansions of the Rhein-Ruhr-Express lines.

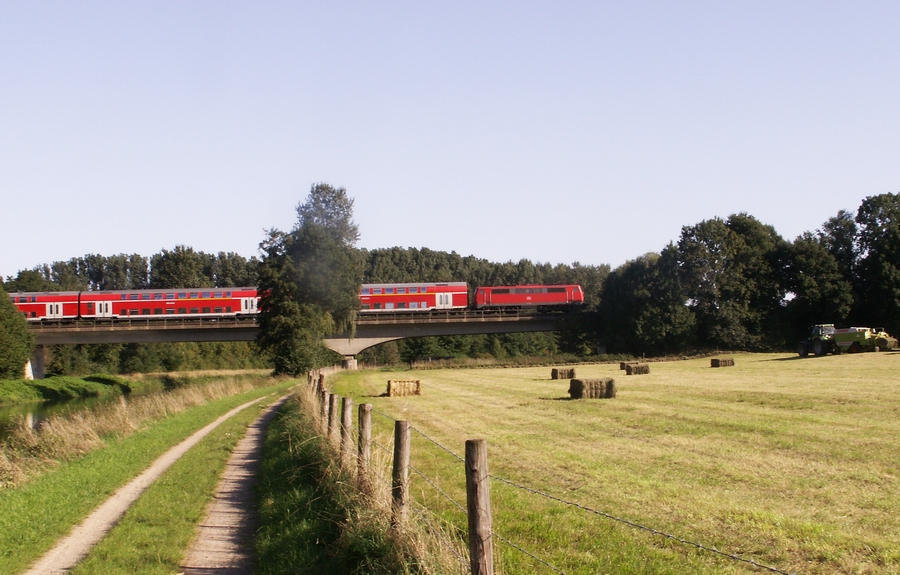
Wupper-Express near Baal

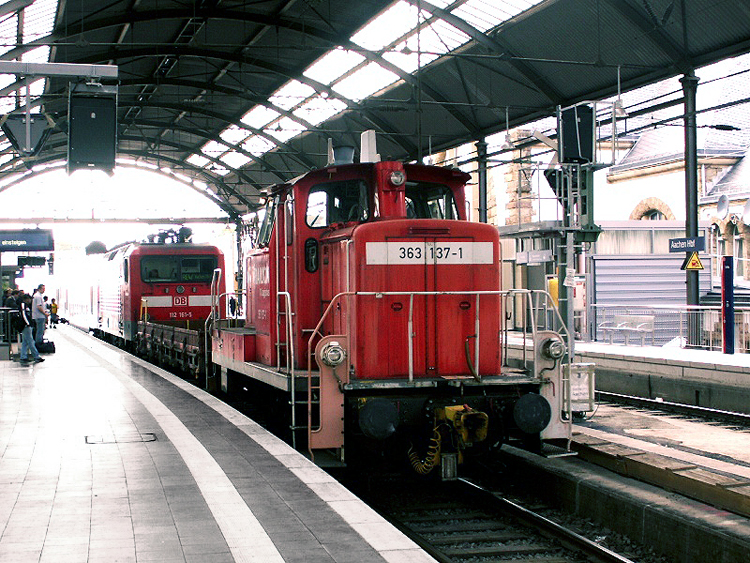
Preparation of the train in Aachen

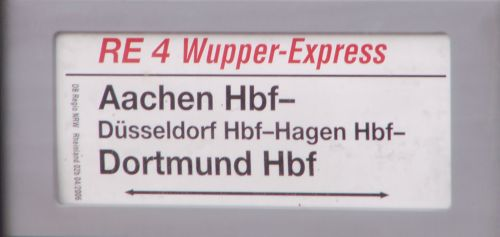
Train running label

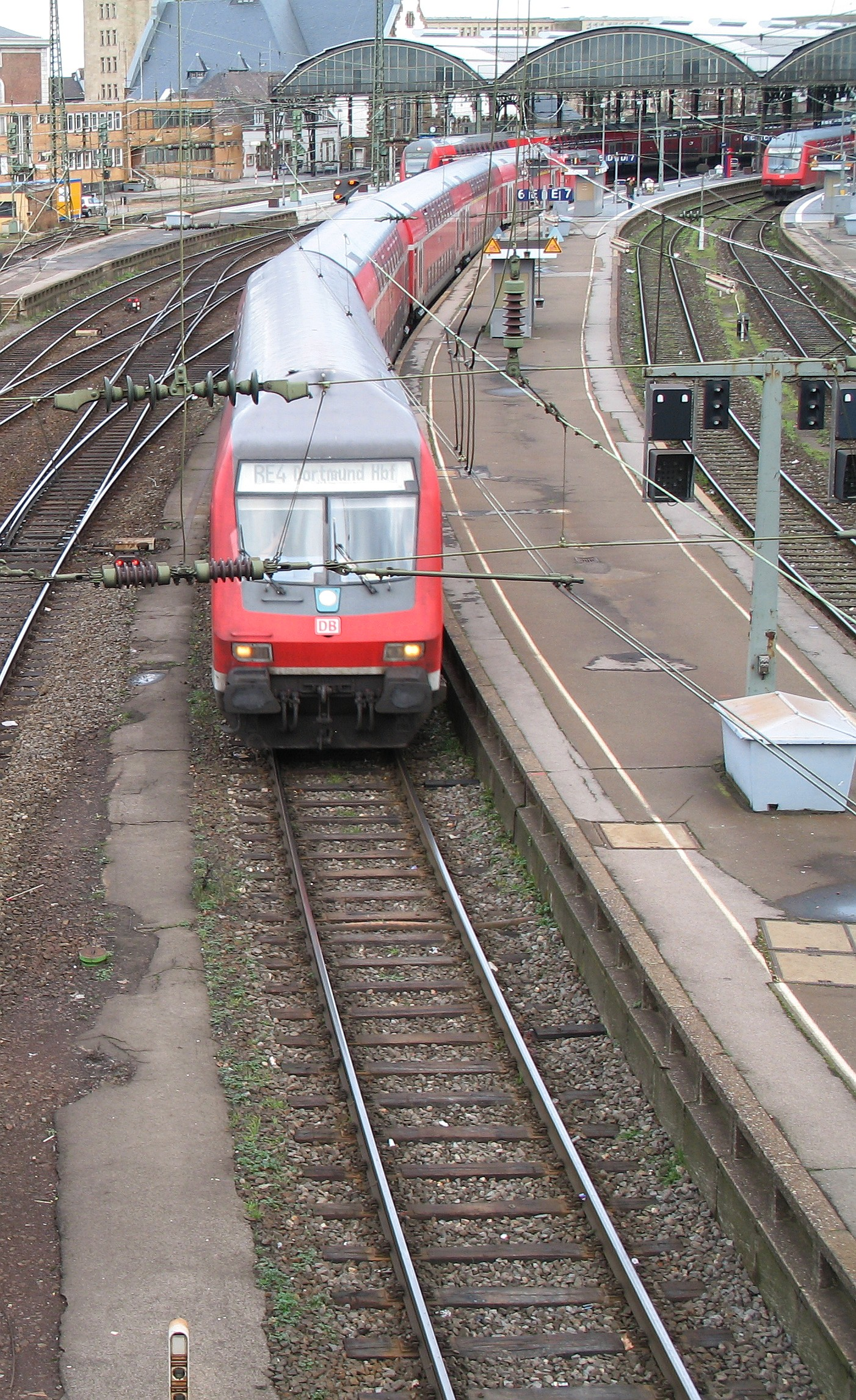
Leaving Aachen Hbf

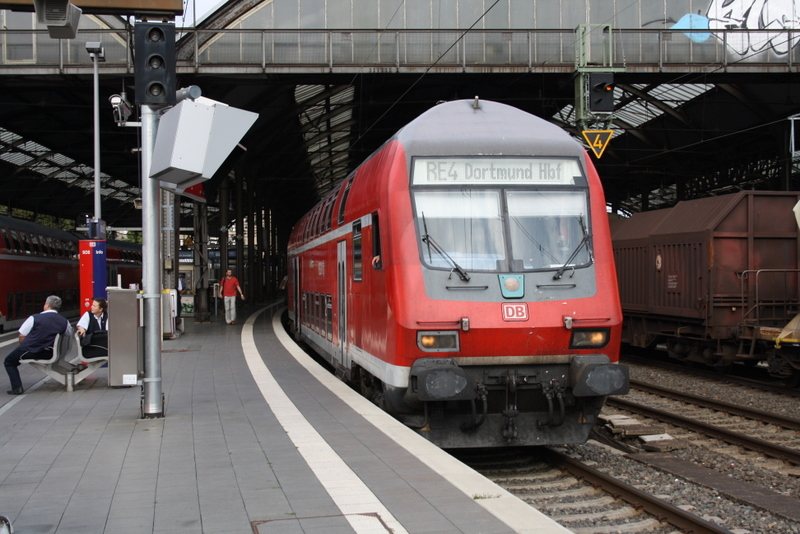
Wupper-Express on track 3 in Aachen Hbf

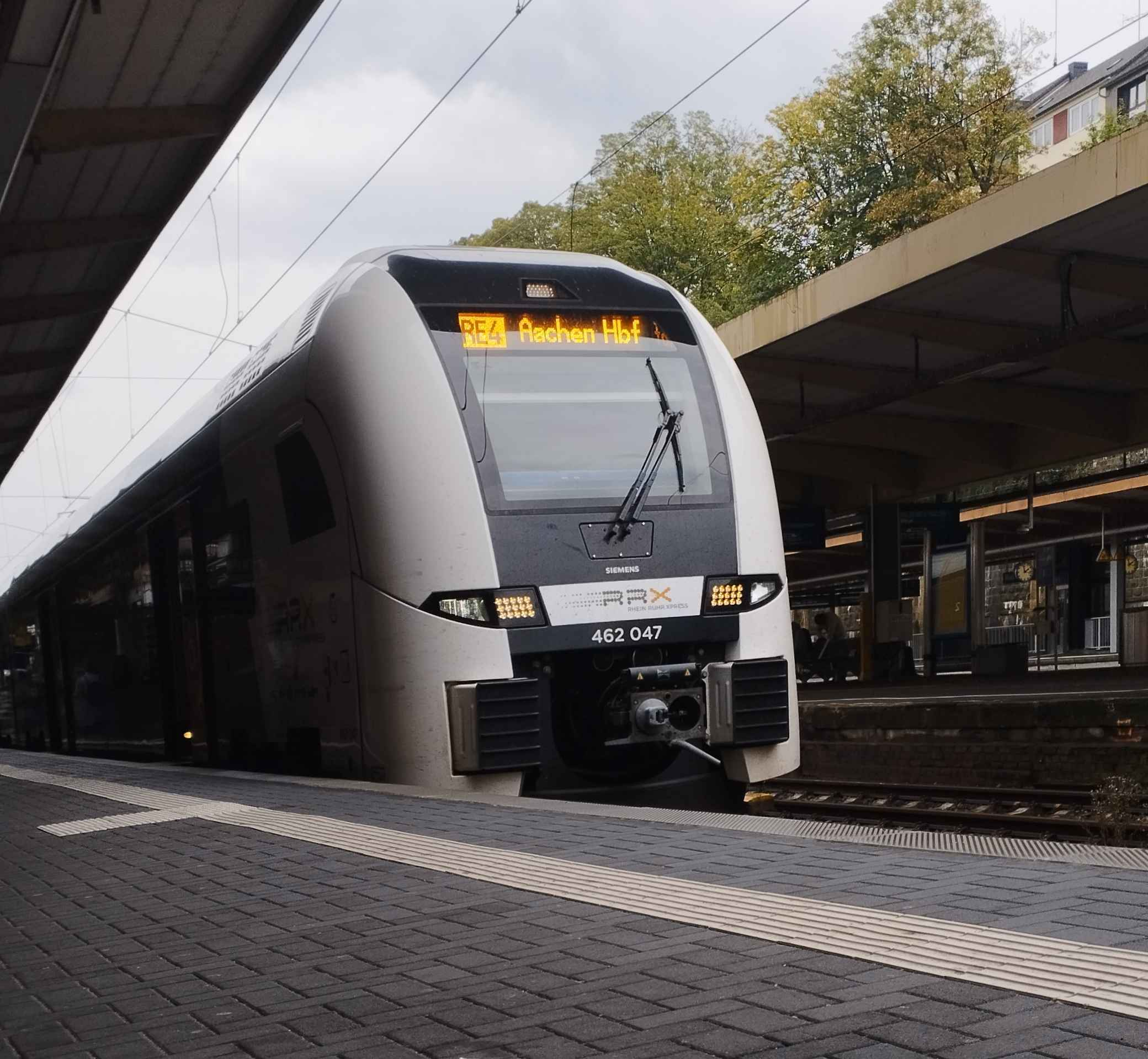
Wupper-Express with Siemens Desiro HC in Wuppertal Hbf

== See also ==
- List of regional rail lines in North Rhine-Westphalia
- List of scheduled railway routes in Germany
