= Hamm Railway Bridge =

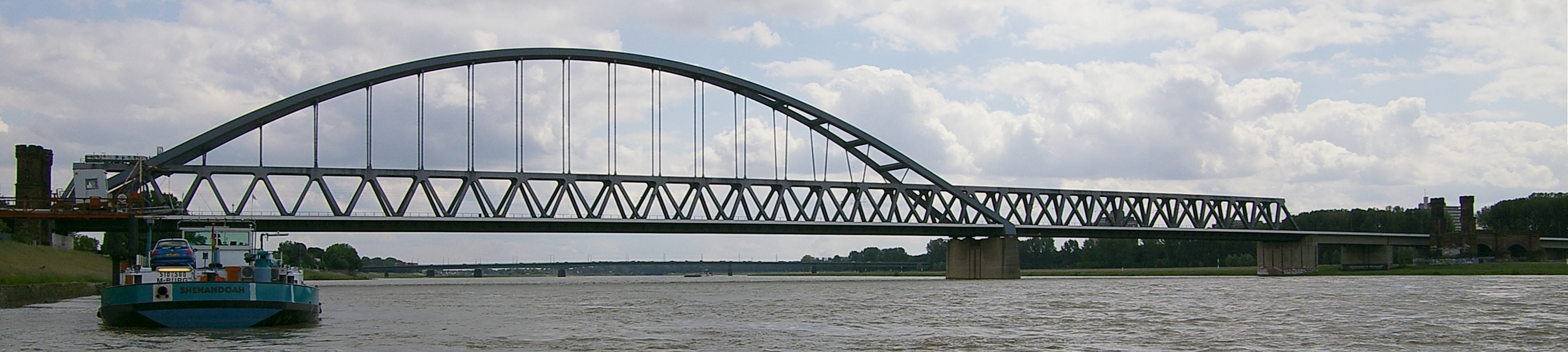
- Coordinates: 51°12′30″N 6°43′51″E
- Carries: Trains
- Crosses: Rhine
- Locale: Düsseldorf, North Rhine-Westphalia, Germany
- Official name: Hammer Eisenbahnbrücke

Characteristics
- Design: Through truss, Warren truss tied-arch, continuous truss
- Total length: 813.5 m (2,669 ft)
- Width: 26.5 m (87 ft)
- Height: 47.5 m (156 ft)
- Longest span: 250 m (820 ft)

History
- Opened: 1987

Location
- Interactive map of Hamm Railway Bridge

The Hamm Railway Bridge (German: Hammer Eisenbahnbrücke) carries the Mönchengladbach–Düsseldorf railway over the Rhine between the Düsseldorf suburb of Hamm and the Neuss district of Rheinparkcenter in the German state of North Rhine-Westphalia.

The original Hamm Railway Bridge was a double-track bridge built by the Bergisch-Märkische Railway Company from April 1868 as the first solid bridge across the Rhine in Düsseldorf and was opened on 24 July 1870. It was named the König-Wilhelm-Brücke ("King William Bridge") or König-Wilhelm-Eisenbahn-Rheinbrücke (“King William railway bridge across the Rhine”) after the Prussian King William I. It was built as a wrought iron arch supporting a three-span truss to plans of the engineer Pichier of the Harkort Company (Harkort’sche Fabrik) of Duisburg. The bridge towers on both sides reflected not only a need for architectural decoration, but also a desire to promote the military security of the bridge in the event of a war. For the same reason there was an outer fort at the side of the bridge, which was removed in 1885. Between July and September 1896, the approaches to the bridge were repaired and the track body was renewed under traffic. The whole construction was carried out in heavy traffic with all traffic handled on a single track.

After 1896 the greatly increasing train traffic necessitated the building of additional infrastructure to complement the bridge. Between 1909 and 1911, a second, parallel, double-track bridge was built only 32 m (105 ft) upstream. It was built with the same distance between the piers, with a more modern and stronger superstructure as an iron truss arch. As with the older bridge there were bridge towers, but they were larger and stronger.

Immediately after the commissioning of the new bridge, the modernisation of old bridge began, with the half-parabolic beams being replaced with new superstructure, which were identical to those of the second bridge. After its completion in November 1912, there were two quasi-identical bridges next to each other, with only the bridge towers differing significantly.

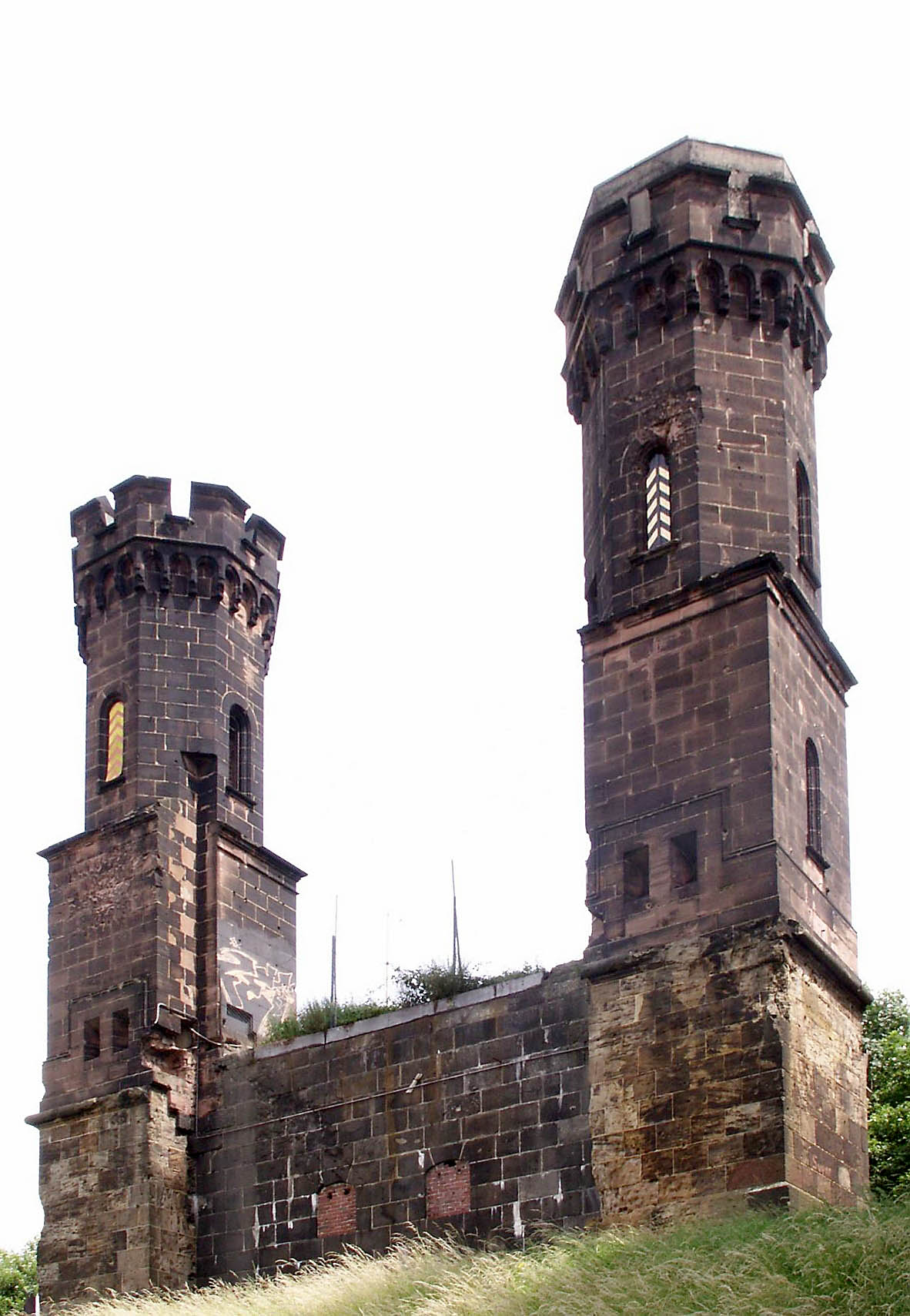
Ruins of the old security fort (east bank)

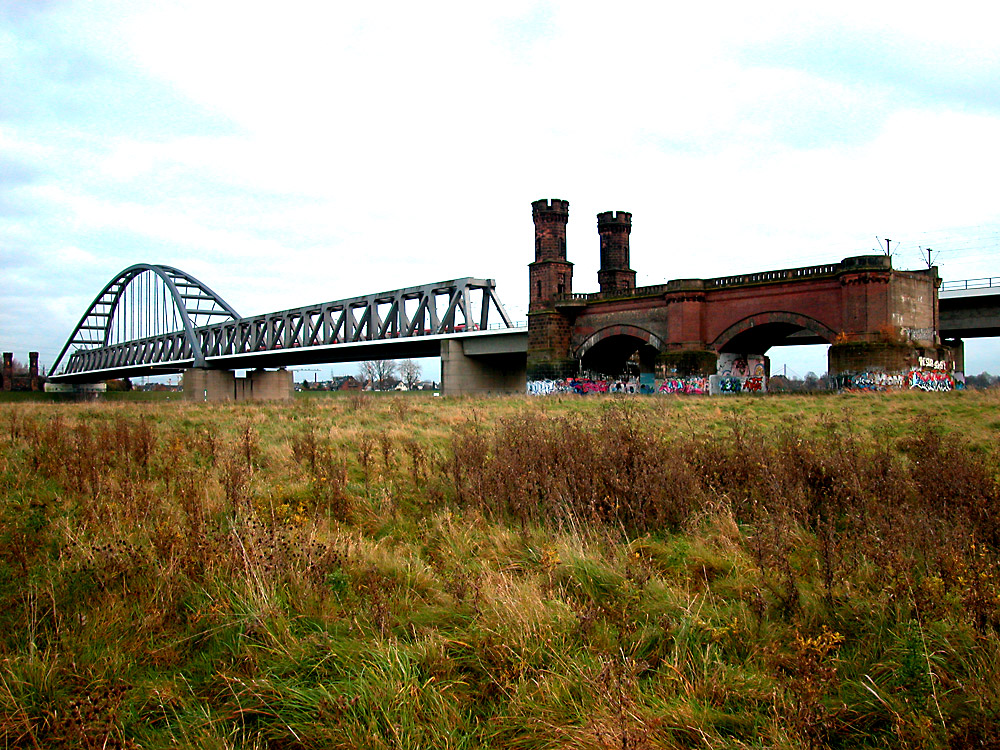
Hamm Bridge and ruins of its predecessor

During the Second World War, the U.S. Army conquered the neighbouring town of Neuss on 1 March 1945. To slow the advancing troops' crossing of the Rhine, the German Wehrmacht then blew up all the Rhine bridges in Düsseldorf, including the Hamm Railway Bridge, on 3 March 1945. Already in late 1945, temporary repairs began on the less damaged northern bridge, on which the two destroyed central arches were replaced by a temporary bridge made from standardised parts to the "Schaper-Krupp-Reichsbahn” design. Despite many difficulties, the bridge was already taken into operation on 31 July 1946. For the final reconstruction of the northern bridge, the least damaged arches of the identical southern bridge were substituted for the temporary spans; this exchange was completed in November 1947, removing the need for speed or weight restrictions. The ruins of the southern bridge were not rebuilt and the iron parts were used for scrap. The piers and bridge towers remain in a ruined condition.

The construction of the east–west S-Bahn line S 8 in 1984 required the building of a new railway bridge to restore the Hamm Railway Bridge to four tracks again. The cost of this amounted to the equivalent of €61.4 million. In this case, the span for the shipping channel was greatly expanded. The new bridge was built to the south of the original bridge.

The two-span river bridge has as its main span a 250 m-long (820 ft) tied arch bridge attached to a through truss span built as a Warren truss with a span of 135 m (443 ft). The construction is reminiscent of the historic structure. The bridge is designed so that two tracks are within the truss structure and a single track runs on both sides outside of the truss. The 9,000 tonne construction is fully welded. The bridge was built with heavy items of up to 100 tonnes built in an assembly area on the Düsseldorf bank and inserted in the final construction. The new bridge was opened in 1987 and had, until the opening of the Grümpentalbrücke (Grümpen Viaduct) on the Nuremberg–Erfurt high-speed railway with a 250-metre-long span, the longest railway bridge span in Germany. The old north bridge was then demolished and the bridge towers were left as a relic of the original bridge of 1870. The Bergische Lehnsritter e. V. club now has its headquarters in the towers.

== See also ==
- List of bridges over the Rhine
- List of bridges in Germany
