= Dortmund-Mengede station =

Railway station in Dortmund, Germany

Dortmund Mengede
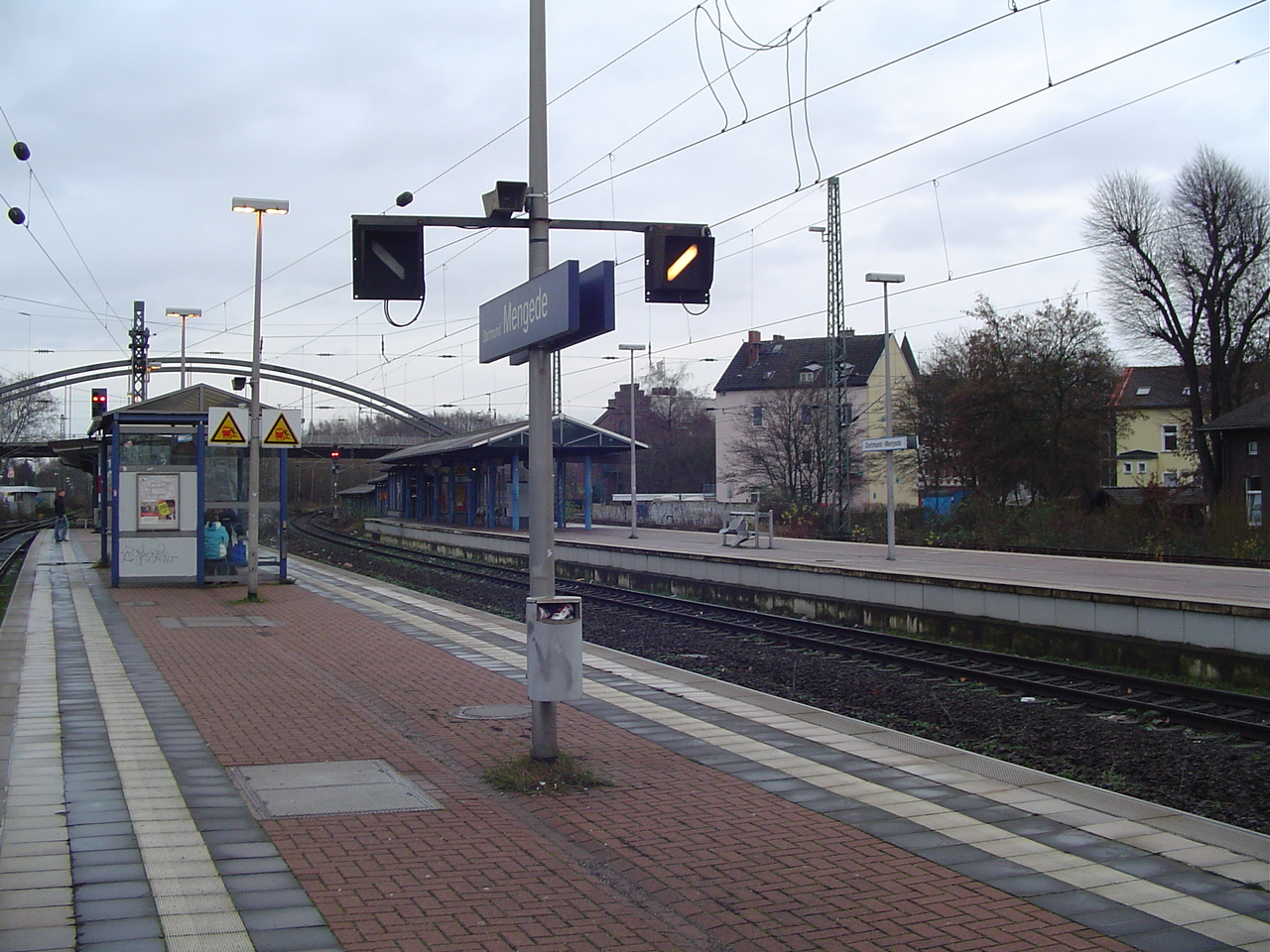

General information
- Location: Dortmund-Mengede, NRW; Germany
- Coordinates: 51°34′13″N 7°22′29″E
- Owner: DB Netz
- Operator: DB Station&Service
- Lines: Duisburg–Dortmund (KBS 416); Welver–Sterkrade (KBS 450.2)
- Platforms: 4

Construction
- Accessible: Yes

Other information
- Station code: 1320
- DS100 code: EDMG
- Category: 5
- Fare zone: VRR: 377
- Website: www.bahnhof.de

History
- Opened: 1848

Services
Preceding station		Following station
Castrop-Rauxel Hbf towards Düsseldorf Hbf	RE 3	Dortmund Hbf towards Hamm (Westf) Hbf
Preceding station	DB Regio NRW	Following station
Castrop-Rauxel Hbf towards Duisburg Hbf	RB 32	Dortmund Hbf Terminus
Preceding station	Rhine-Ruhr S-Bahn	Following station
Castrop-Rauxel Hbf towards Essen Hbf or Recklinghausen Hbf	S2	DO-Nette/Oestrich towards Dortmund Hbf
Location

Dortmund-Mengede station is located in the Dortmund suburb of Mengede in the German state of North Rhine-Westphalia. The station was opened in 1848 as part of the trunk line of the former Cologne-Minden Railway Company.

Mengede station is used by a range of passenger services and includes an area to the north-west of the passenger station that is used for shunting and freight. Four tracks are available for passenger operations. Two tracks are served by the Regional-Express service RE 3, Rhein-Emscher-Express, the other two tracks are served by S-Bahn line S 2. The two platforms are connected by an underground pedestrian tunnel. The walkway tunnel is not yet equipped with lifts, so people in wheelchairs can only use the platforms with assistance.

At the station there are 136 park and ride spaces for cars and 16 bicycle lockers, which were built as part of the “Bike and Ride” concept. An expansion of the capacity of these facilities is planned.

The station's platform canopy is listed as a monument by the city of Dortmund.

The freight and marshalling yard was used mainly to handle coal despatched to the Gustav Knepper Power Station until its closure in 2014. Formerly coal was transported from the Adolf von Hansemann colliery, which closed in 1967.

== Services ==
The station is served by the RE 3 (Rhein-Emscher-Express) and the RB32 (Rhein-Emscher-Bahn), each hourly, and line S2 of the Rhine-Ruhr S-Bahn every 30 minutes.

Line	Line name	Route
RE 3	Rhein-Emscher-Express	Düsseldorf – Duisburg – Oberhausen – Gelsenkirchen – Dortmund-Mengede – Dortmund – Hamm (Westf)
RB 32	Rhein-Emscher-Bahn	Duisburg – Gelsenkirchen – Dortmund-Mengede – Dortmund
S2	S-Bahn Rhein-Ruhr	(Essen – Gelsenkirchen) / (Recklinghausen) – Dortmund-Mengede – Dortmund

It is also served by bus routes 470 (Mengede- Oespel); 473 (Mengede- Eving); 474 (Mengede - Groppenbruch [ - Lünen-Brambauer]); 475 ( Mengede - Dortmund Central Station) and 482 (Mengede - Castrop-Rauxel) by DSW21 and SB24 (Mengede - Waltrop- Datteln - Oer-Erkenschwick - Recklinghausen Central Station) and 289 (Mengede - Waltrop) by Vestische Straßenbahnen.
