= Castrop-Rauxel Hauptbahnhof =

Railway station in North Rhine-Westphalia, Germany

Castrop-Rauxel Hbf
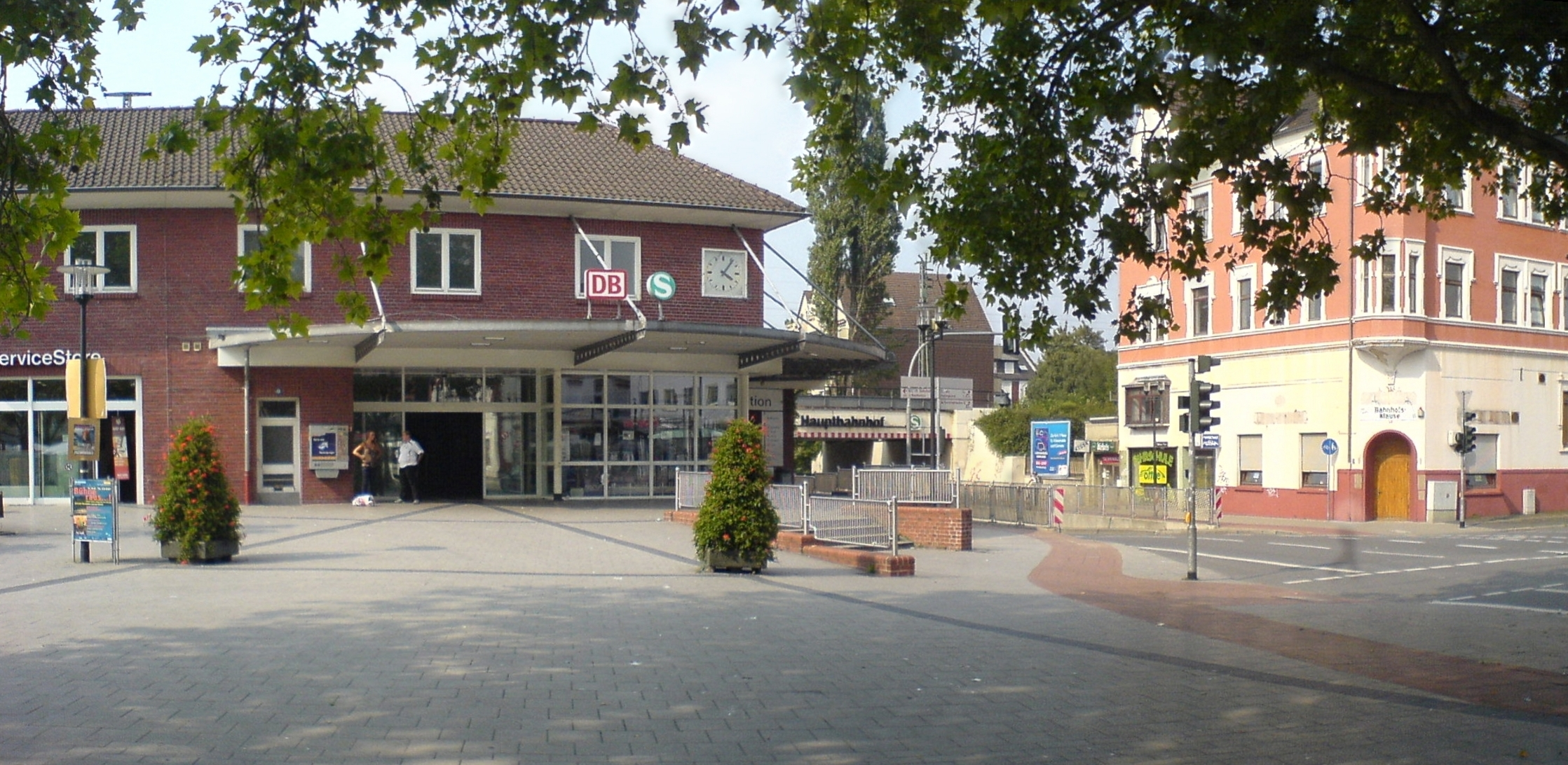
- Station building and forecourt

General information
- Location: Castrop-Rauxel, NRW; Germany
- Coordinates: 51°34′24″N 7°18′12″E
- Owner: DB Netz
- Operator: DB Station&Service
- Lines: Duisburg–Dortmund (KBS 416) S2
- Platforms: 3

Construction
- Accessible: Yes

Other information
- Station code: 1033
- DS100 code: ECA
- Category: 4
- Fare zone: VRR: 280 and 282
- Website: www.bahnhof.de

History
- Opened: 15 May 1847

Services
Preceding station		Following station
Herne towards Düsseldorf Hbf	RE 3	Dortmund-Mengede towards Hamm (Westf) Hbf
Preceding station	DB Regio NRW	Following station
Herne towards Duisburg Hbf	RB 32	Dortmund-Mengede towards Dortmund Hbf
Preceding station	Rhine-Ruhr S-Bahn	Following station
Herne towards Essen Hbf or Recklinghausen Hbf	S2	Dortmund-Mengede towards Dortmund Hbf
Location

Castrop-Rauxel Hauptbahnhof is a railway station in the German city of Castrop-Rauxel. It is situated on the S2 line of the Rhine-Ruhr S-Bahn, stopping every half hour. Additional, the RE 3 (Rhein-Emscher-Express) and the RB32 (Rhein-Emscher-Bahn) both stop hourly.

== History ==
The station was opened in 1848 as part of the trunk line of the former Cologne-Minden Railway Company. Castrop station was opened for passenger services with this section of the line on 15 May 1847. Facilities were built at the station up to 1862 for handling freight.

About 1880 the station was renamed Rauxel, as the station was located in that municipality at the time. After the municipal reform the mid-20th century, which merged of the towns of Castrop and Rauxel, the station was renamed again as Castrop-Rauxel Hauptbahnhof in about 1962.

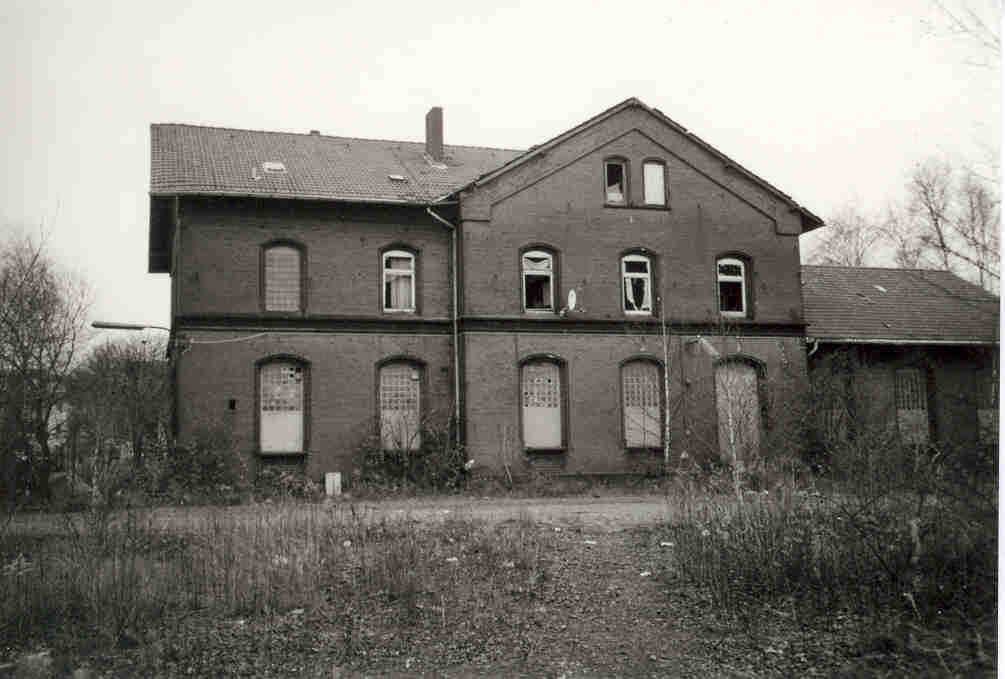
Former Castrop station on the Westphalian Emscher Valley Railway
