= Dortmund-Westerfilde station =

Railway station in Dortmund, Germany

Dortmund Westerfilde
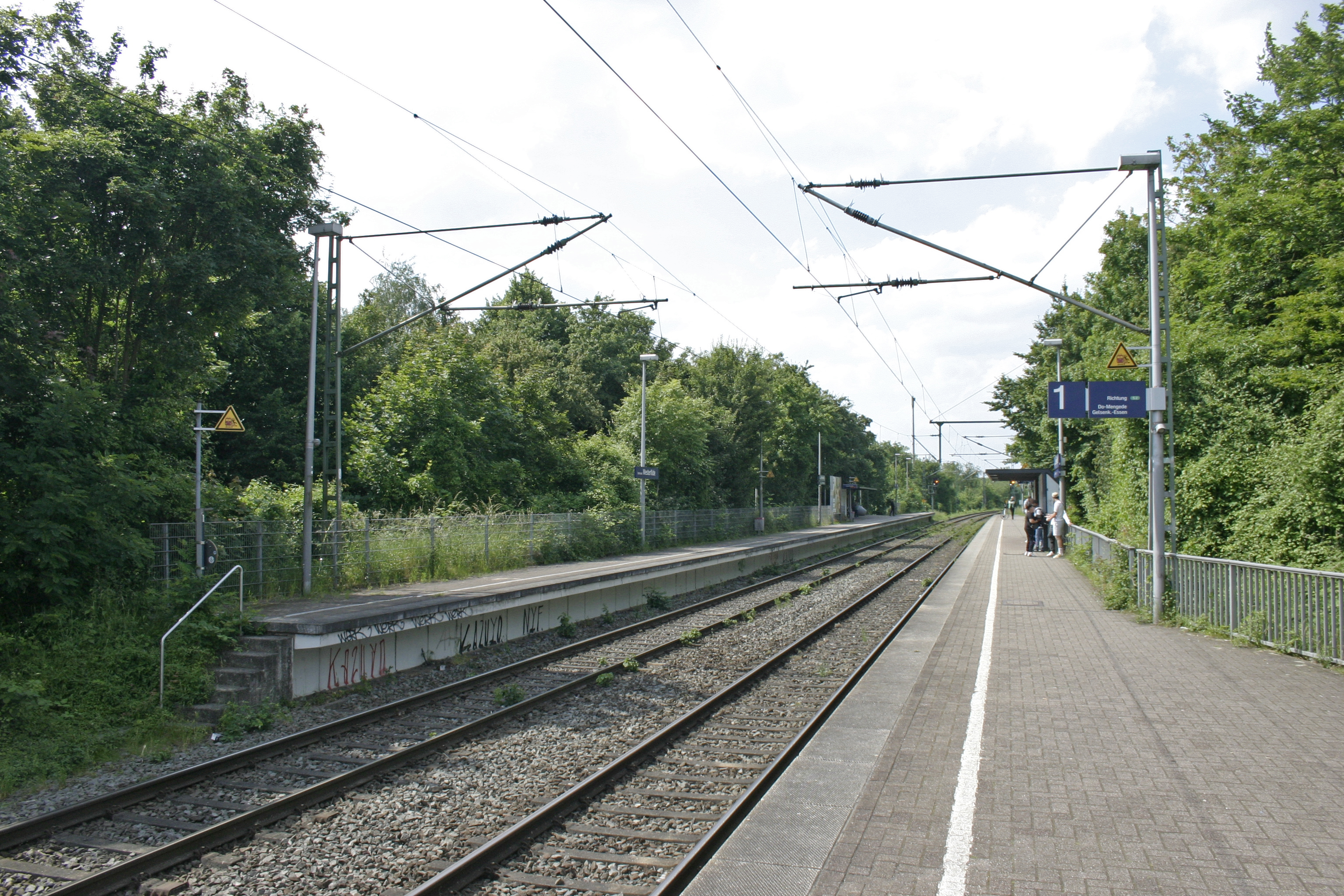
- Dortmund-Westerfilde S-Bahn station in 2024

General information
- Location: Westerfilder Str., Dortmund, NRW; Germany
- Coordinates: 51°32′54″N 7°22′49″E
- Owner: DB Netz
- Operator: DB Station&Service
- Line: Welver–Sterkrade railway
- Platforms: 2
- Train operators: DB Regio NRW

Construction
- Accessible: Yes

Other information
- Station code: 1326
- DS100 code: EDOF
- IBNR: 8001525
- Category: 6
- Fare zone: VRR: 377
- Website: www.bahnhof.de

History
- Opened: 2 June 1991

Services
Preceding station	Rhine-Ruhr S-Bahn	Following station
Dortmund-Nette/Oestrich towards Essen Hbf or Recklinghausen Hbf	S2	Dortmund-Huckarde towards Dortmund Hbf
Preceding station	Rhine-Ruhr Stadtbahn	Following station
Terminus	U47	Obernette towards Aplerbeck
Location
- Location within North Rhine-Westphalia

Dortmund-Westerfilde is a railway station on the Welver–Sterkrade railway situated in Dortmund in western Germany. It is classified by Deutsche Bahn as a category 6 station. It is served by Rhine-Ruhr S-Bahn line S2 every 30 minutes. It offers connections to line U47 of the Dortmund Stadtbahn at 10-minute intervals on working days as well as two bus routes, 470 (Mengede – Kirchlinde – Lütgendortmund – Oespel (– 440 Barop) and 471 (Nette – Mengede – Oestrich – Bodelschwingh), both operated by Dortmunder Stadtwerke (DSW21) at 20-minute intervals on working days.
