= Herne station =

Railway station in Herne, Germany

Herne
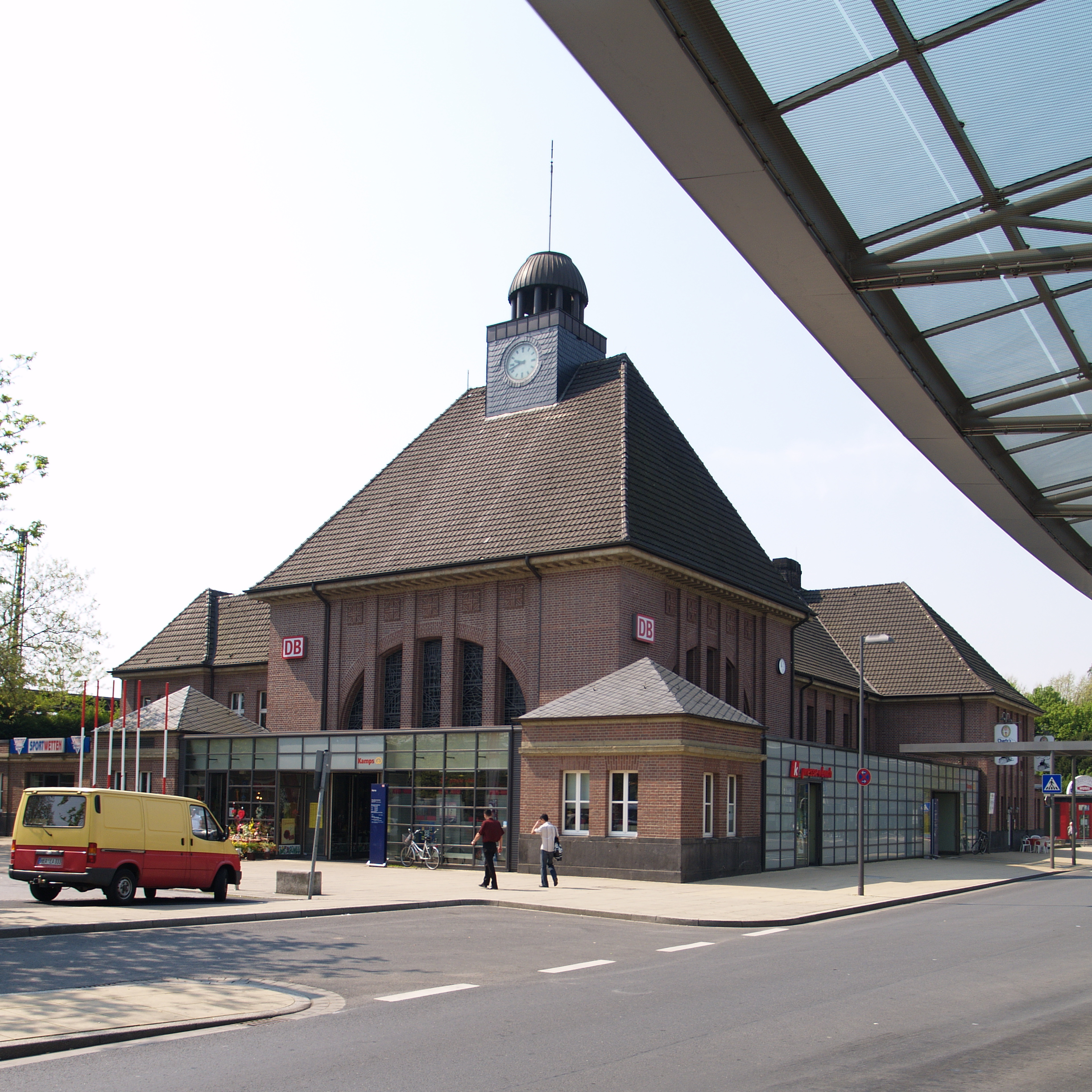
- Herne station seen from the bus station

General information
- Location: Konrad-Adenauer-Platz 1 Herne, NRW; Germany
- Coordinates: 51°32′37″N 7°13′4″E
- Owner: Deutsche Bahn
- Operator: DB Netz; DB Station&Service
- Lines: Duisburg–Dortmund (KBS 416); Duisburg-Ruhrort–Dortmund (KBS 426)
- Platforms: 4
- Train operators: DB Regio NRW eurobahn

Construction
- Accessible: Yes

Other information
- Station code: 2722
- DS100 code: EHER
- IBNR: 8000164
- Category: 4
- Fare zone: VRR: 270
- Website: www.bahnhof.de

History
- Opened: 1914

Services
Preceding station		Following station
Wanne-Eickel Hbf towards Düsseldorf Hbf	RE 3	Castrop-Rauxel Hbf towards Hamm (Westf) Hbf
Preceding station	DB Regio NRW	Following station
Wanne-Eickel Hbf towards Duisburg Hbf	RB 32	Castrop-Rauxel Hbf towards Dortmund Hbf
Wanne-Eickel Hbf towards Dorsten	RB 43	Herne-Börnig towards Dortmund Hbf
Preceding station	Rhine-Ruhr S-Bahn	Following station
Recklinghausen Süd towards Recklinghausen Hbf	S2	Castrop-Rauxel Hbf towards Dortmund Hbf
Wanne-Eickel Hbf towards Essen Hbf	S2	Castrop-Rauxel Hbf towards Dortmund Hbf
Preceding station	Rhine-Ruhr Stadtbahn	Following station
Schloß Strünkede Terminus	U35	Herne Mitte towards Hustadt
Location
- Location within North Rhine-Westphalia

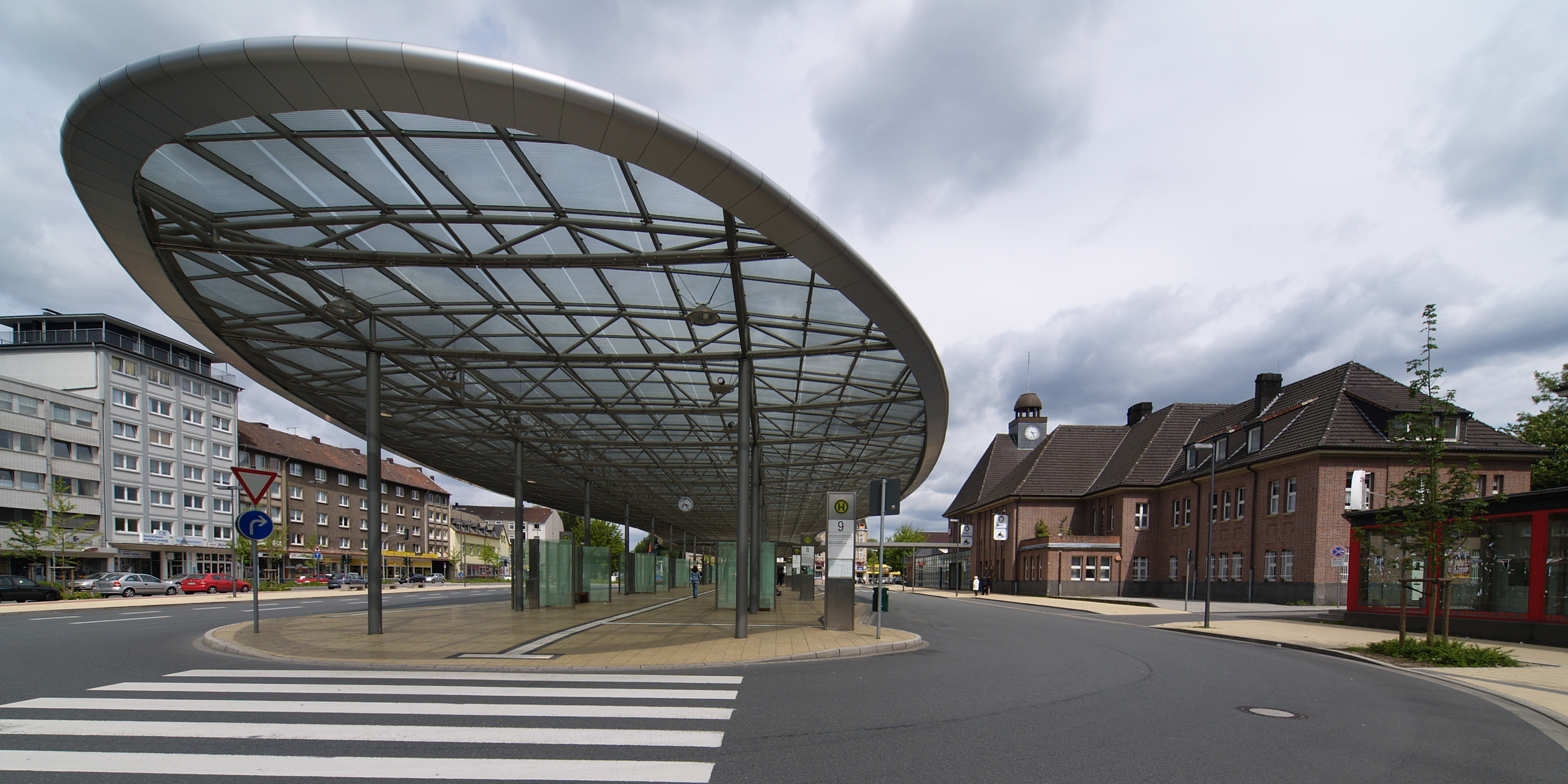
Herne bus station

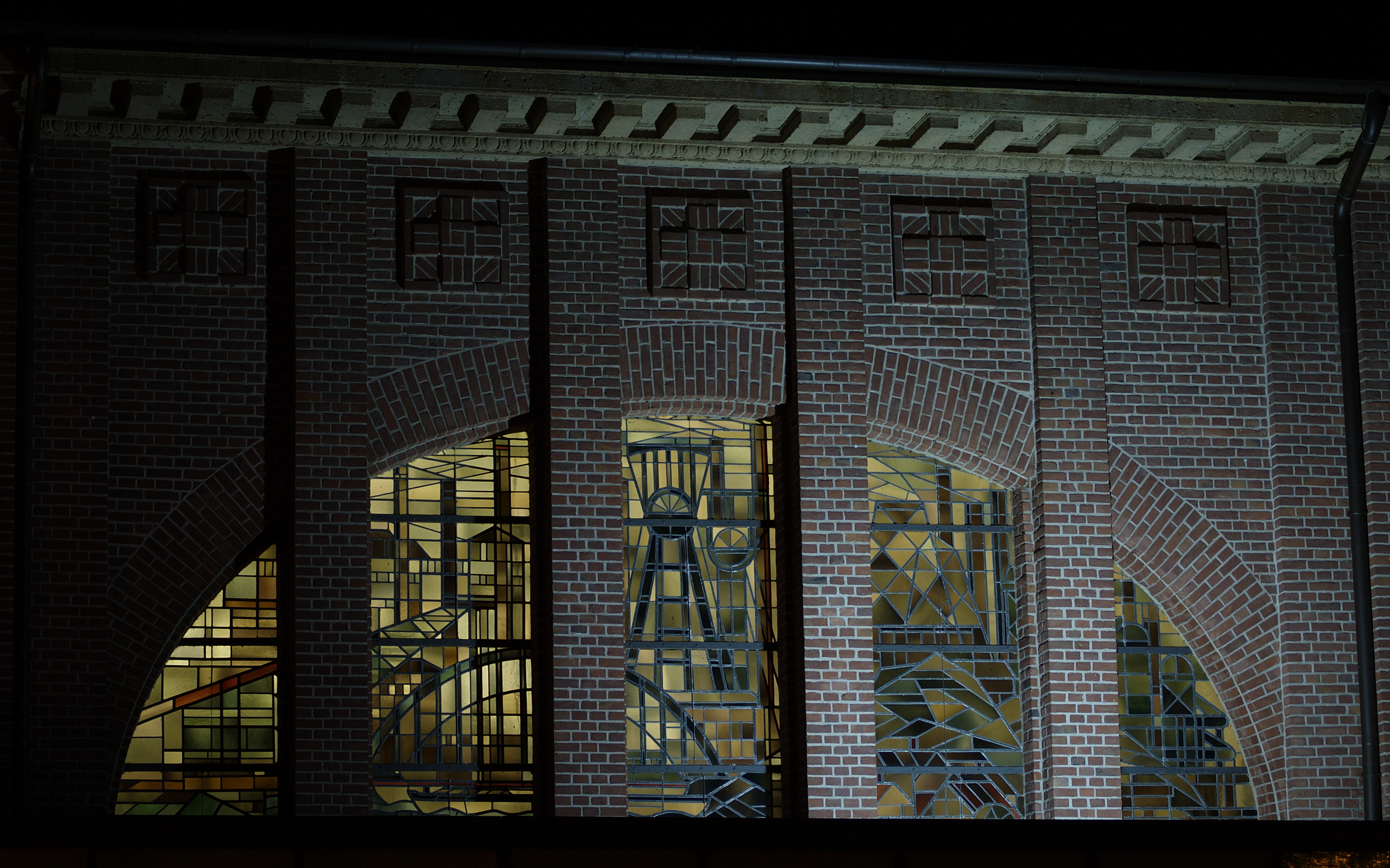
The stained glass window on the eastern side of the concourse

Herne station was opened in the inner city of Herne in the German state of North Rhine-Westphalia in 1847 together with the Cologne-Minden trunk line. It was located between the village of Herne, which had about 1,000 inhabitants, and the moated castle of Schloss Strünkede and was south of the current station on Von-der-Heydt-Strasse. It soon had a connection to the more southerly city of Bochum, which until 14 years later did not have its own station. For this reason the station was called Herne-Bochum until 1855.

== The station building ==
The Cologne-Minden Railway Company opened a station in 1847. It was demolished in 1911 to make way for the current building, which was built by the Prussian state railways in 1914. It was modernised in 1970, the dome over the entrance hall was concealed by a suspended ceiling, the windows were removed and the window openings bricked up. As part of a project called Internationale Bauausstellung (international building exhibition) Emscher Park, it was given a proper restoration, beginning in 1990. The dome was opened up, the windows were reinstalled and the former 3rd class waiting room, which had been sealed off, was opened up again for special events. The room that housed the Bummelzug cafe until December 2008 has been a fast food restaurant since early 2010. The building also houses a bakery, a kiosk, a lottery counter and a book and magazine store.

=== The stained glass window ===
Above the eastern entrance to the station concourse is a semi-circular, stained glass window divided by four pillars into five sections. The window is by the Herne artist Jupp Gesing and represents aspects of the former Friedrich der Große (Frederick the Great) colliery, which was nearby. It includes a harbour crane, a canal bridge, buildings and chimneys of the mine, two head frames, cooling towers, slag heaps and colliery village houses. The windows were first installed in 1953 and were donated by the Friedrich der Große colliery.

== Rail services ==
Today Herne station is served by the Rhein-Emscher-Express (RE 3), running every hour between Hamm and Düsseldorf. The RB 32 (Rhein-Emscher-Bahn) runs hourly between Duisburg and Dortmund and the RB 43 (Emschertal-Bahn) runs hourly between Dortmund and Dorsten. S-Bahn line S2 runs every thirty minutes to and from Dortmund, with one continuing each hour from Herne to each of Essen and Recklinghausen.

Line	Line name	Route
RE 3	Rhein-Emscher-Express	Düsseldorf – Duisburg – Oberhausen – Gelsenkirchen – Herne – Dortmund – Hamm (Westf)
RB 32	Rhein-Emscher-Bahn	Duisburg – Essen-Altenessen – Gelsenkirchen – Wanne-Eickel – Herne – Castrop-Rauxel – Dortmund
RB 43	Emschertal-Bahn	Dorsten – Gladbeck - Wanne-Eickel – Herne – Dortmund
S2	Rhine-Ruhr S-Bahn	(Essen – Gelsenkirchen ) / (Recklinghausen) – Herne – Dortmund

In addition, Herne station is a major hub for public transport. The following lines stop and start here: express bus line SB20 of Vestische Straßenbahnen (Recklinghausen buses) and city bus lines 303, 311, 312, 323, 333, 362 and 367 of Straßenbahn Herne–Castrop-Rauxel and bus line 390 of BOGESTRA. Located just to the northeast of the station is the underground station of line U35 of the Bochum Stadtbahn, operated by BOGESTRA.
