= Dortmund-Nette/Oestrich station =

Railway station in Dortmund, Germany

Dortmund Nette/Oestrich
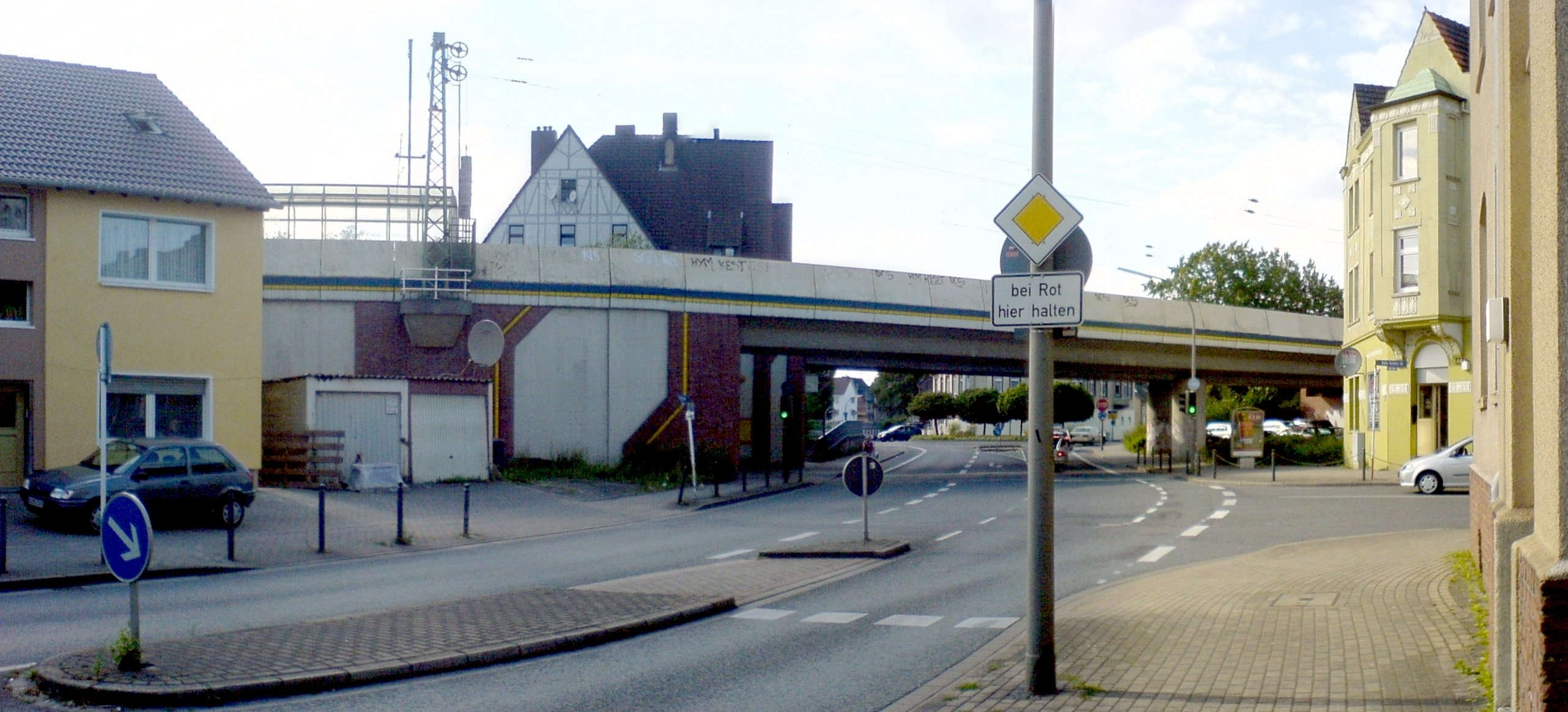

General information
- Location: Haberlandstr., Dortmund, NRW; Germany
- Coordinates: 51°33′40″N 7°22′38″E
- Lines: Welver–Sterkrade railway (KBS 450.2)
- Platforms: 2

Construction
- Accessible: Yes

Other information
- Station code: 1321
- DS100 code: EDOO
- IBNR: 8001519
- Category: 6
- Fare zone: VRR: 377
- Website: www.bahnhof.de

History
- Opened: 24 May 1998

Services
Preceding station	Rhine-Ruhr S-Bahn	Following station
DO-Mengede towards Essen Hbf or Recklinghausen Hbf	S2	DO-Westerfilde towards Dortmund Hbf
Location

Dortmund-Nette/Oestrich station is located in the city of Dortmund in the German state of North Rhine-Westphalia. It is on a link (line 2191) between the Welver–Sterkrade railway and the Duisburg–Dortmund railway built for the opening of the line S2 of the Rhine-Ruhr S-Bahn. The line and station opened on 2 June 1991. It is classified by Deutsche Bahn as a category 6 station.

The station is served by line S 2 (running between Dortmund and Recklinghausen or Essen), operating every 30 minutes during the day.

It is also served by three bus routes operated by DSW21: 472 (Mengede - Groppenbruch - Brambauer + Mengede - Brauck, at 60-minute intervals), 477 (Mengede Markt + Bodelschwingh, at 60-minute intervals) and 478 (Mengede Markt + Obernette, at 60-minute intervals). It is also served by route 361 (Mengede + Dingen - Deininghausen - Castrop - Ev.Krh), operated by Straßenbahn Herne - Castrop-Rauxel GmbH at 60-minute intervals.
