= Herne-Wanne-Eickel Hauptbahnhof =

Railway station in North Rhine-Westphalia, Germany

Herne Wanne-Eickel Hbf
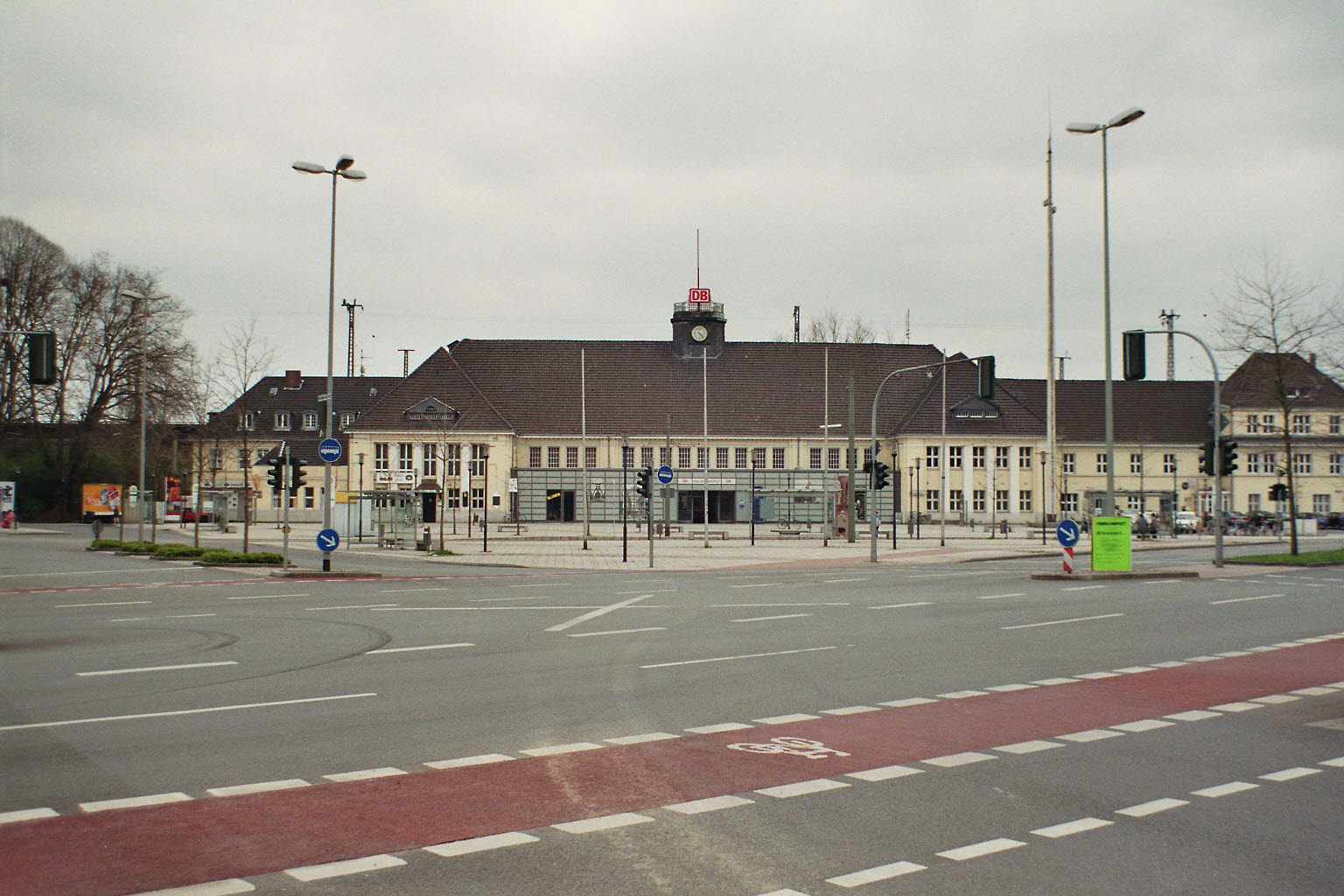
- The station building

General information
- Location: Heinz-Rühmann-Platz 1, Herne, NRW; Germany
- Coordinates: 51°31′53″N 7°9′57″E
- Owner: Deutsche Bahn
- Operator: DB Netz; DB Station&Service
- Lines: Wanne-Eickel–Hamburg; Dortmund–Duisburg; Duisburg-Ruhrort–Dortmund; Bochum–Gelsenkirchen
- Platforms: 8
- Train operators: DB Regio NRW eurobahn NordWestBahn
- Connections: 306

Construction
- Accessible: Yes (not platforms 1&2)

Other information
- Station code: 6533
- DS100 code: EWAN
- IBNR: 8000192
- Category: 3
- Fare zone: VRR: 272
- Website: www.bahnhof.de

History
- Opened: 1856 (freight yard); 1864 (passenger station)

Services
Preceding station	DB Fernverkehr	Following station
Essen Hbf One-way operation	ICE 14	Recklinghausen Hbf towards Berlin Ostbahnhof
Gelsenkirchen Hbf towards Köln Hbf or Koblenz Hbf	IC 35	Recklinghausen Hbf towards Emden Hbf or Norddeich Mole
Preceding station	DB Regio NRW	Following station
Gelsenkirchen Hbf towards Düsseldorf Hbf	RE 2	Recklinghausen Hbf towards Osnabrück Hbf
Gelsenkirchen Hbf towards Mönchengladbach Hbf	RE 42	Recklinghausen Süd towards Münster Hbf
Gelsenkirchen Hbf towards Duisburg Hbf	RB 32	Herne towards Dortmund Hbf
Gelsenkirchen-Zoo towards Dorsten	RB 43	Herne towards Dortmund Hbf
Preceding station		Following station
Gelsenkirchen Hbf towards Düsseldorf Hbf	RE 3	Herne towards Hamm (Westf) Hbf
Preceding station	VIAS	Following station
Gelsenkirchen Hbf Terminus	RB 46	Bochum-Riemke towards Bochum Hbf
Preceding station	Rhine-Ruhr S-Bahn	Following station
Gelsenkirchen Hbf towards Essen Hbf	S2	Herne towards Dortmund Hbf
Location

Herne-Wanne-Eickel Hauptbahnhof (Wanne-Eickel Hauptbahnhof until 14 December 2025) is a railway station in the former city of Wanne-Eickel, now part of Herne in western Germany.

== History ==
The station grew out of the Pluto-Thies freight yard, opened in 1856 on the Duisburg–Dortmund line section of the Cologne-Minden Railway Company's trunk line, which was opened in 1847. In 1864, a halt was opened there for passengers. In 1867 a new freight yard was opened, which was initially called Pluto, but changed to Wanne (literally “basin”, a description of the landscape) in 1869, because the surrounding villages could not agree on a name for the yard. The station's name was reflected in 1875 when the villages of Eickel, Bicker, Crange, Holsterhausen and Röhlinghausen were merged under the name of Amt Wanne.

With the opening of the line to Münster on 1 January 1870, Wanne station became a railway junction. In 1913 the station building and the track work were rebuilt and extended.

After the formation of the city of Wanne-Eickel in 1926, the station was renamed Wanne-Eickel Hauptbahnhof. It became the largest marshalling yard in the central Ruhr area and the only station in the Ruhr that included all four forms of rail operations: in addition to its role as a marshalling yard, it was the home depot for over 300 locomotives along with associated rolling stock, a freight yard and a passenger station.

== Current operations ==
Wanne-Eickel Hauptbahnhof is a station of major traffic importance as a crossroads on the east-west Dortmund–Duisburg line and the north-south Münster–Essen line, which among other things, is the beginning of the Rollbahn (rolling railway) to Hamburg. In addition, the station is located on the Emscher Valley Railway (Dortmund–Wanne-Eickel–Dorsten) and the Bochum–Gelsenkirchen Railway (also known as the Glückauf-Bahn— a reference to Glück auf, the traditional German miners greeting). Part of the old marshalling yard still operates with shunting from west to east over a hump, but other freight operations have been closed.

Following the merger of the cities of Herne and Wanne-Eickel in 1975, the name of the station remained as Wanne–Eickel Hauptbahnhof, although it is the largest station in the city of Herne on its current boundaries. In 2003, Deutsche Bahn planned to rename it Herne-Wanne or Herne Hauptbahnhof. However, these plans met with considerable resistance in the Wanne area, as well as from local politicians in Herne. On 14 December 2025, DB InfraGO announced the renaming of the station to Herne-Wanne-Eickel Hauptbahnhof.

== Lines ==
=== Long-distance ===
In the 2026 timetable, the following long-distance service stopped at the station:

Line	Route	Frequency
IC 35	(Norddeich Mole –) or (Emden Außenhafen –) Emden – Leer – Münster – Recklinghausen – Wanne-Eickel – Gelsenkirchen – Oberhausen – Duisburg – Düsseldorf – Cologne	Every 2 hours

=== Regional ===
Wanne-Eickel is served by the two Regional-Express and three Regionalbahn lines, as well as the Rhine-Ruhr S-Bahn. In the 2026 timetable, the following regional services stopped at the station:

Line	Line name	Route
RE 2	Rhein-Haard-Express	Düsseldorf – Duisburg – Essen – Gelsenkirchen - Wanne-Eickel – Recklinghausen – Münster (Westf) – Osnabrück
RE 3	Rhein-Emscher-Express	Düsseldorf – Duisburg – Oberhausen – Gelsenkirchen - Wanne-Eickel – Herne – Dortmund – Hamm
RE 42	Niers-Haard-Express	Mönchengladbach – Krefeld – Essen – Gelsenkirchen - Wanne-Eickel – Recklinghausen – Haltern – Münster (Westf)
RB 32	Rhein-Emscher-Bahn	Duisburg – Essen-Altenessen – Gelsenkirchen – Wanne-Eickel – Castrop-Rauxel – Dortmund
RB 43	Emschertal-Bahn	Dorsten – Gladbeck - Wanne-Eickel – Herne – Dortmund
RB 46	Glückauf-Bahn	Gelsenkirchen – Wanne-Eickel – Bochum
S2	Rhine-Ruhr S-Bahn	Essen – Gelsenkirchen – Wanne-Eickel – Herne – Dortmund
