= Bochum-Riemke station =

Railway station in Bochum, Germany

Bochum-Riemke
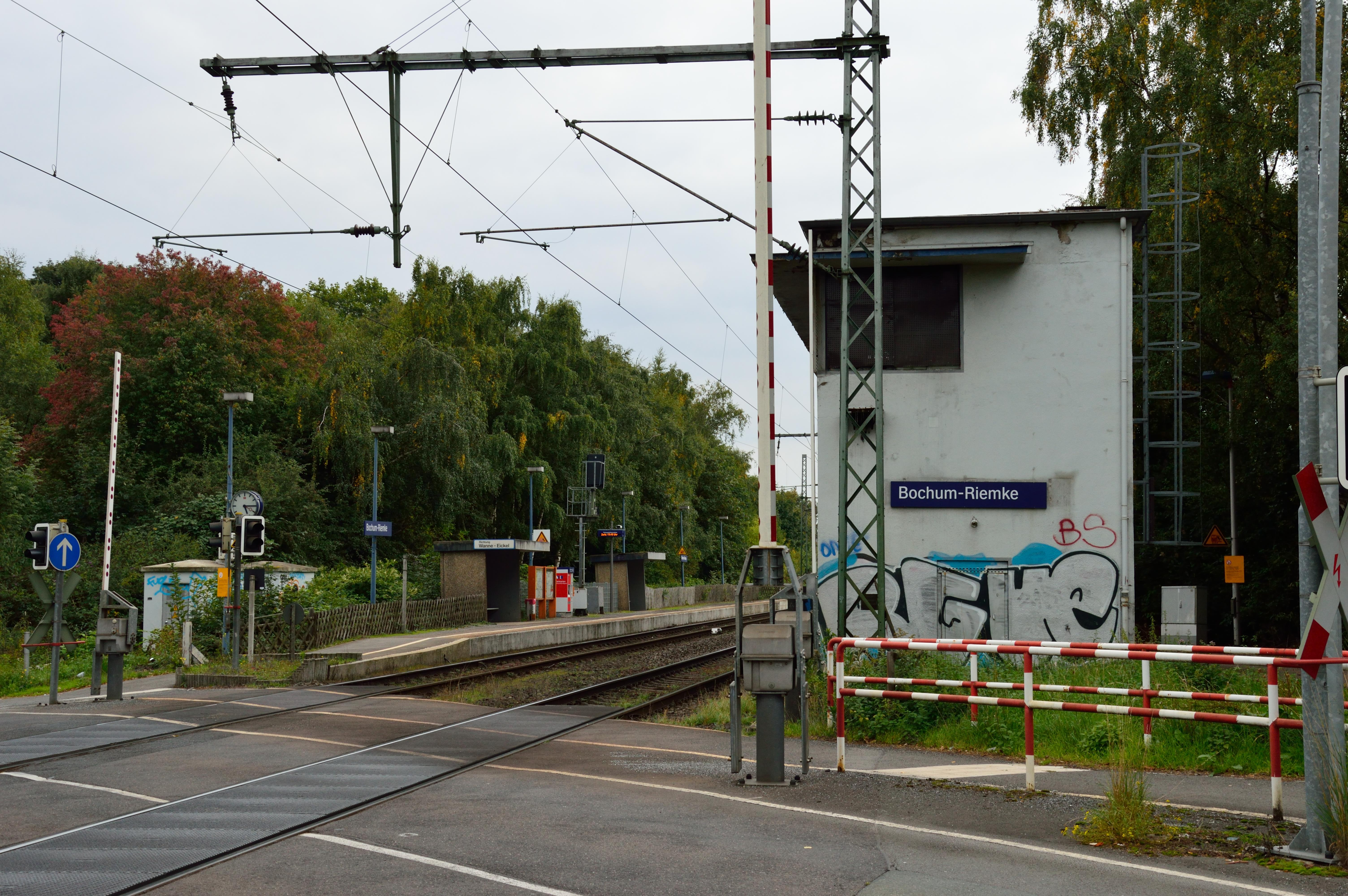
- 2013

General information
- Location: Rensingstraße/Güterbahnstraße; 44807 Bochum-Riemke; North Rhine-Westphalia; Germany
- Coordinates: 51.51777°N 7.20545°E
- System: Hp
- Owner: Deutsche Bahn
- Operator: DB Netz; DB Station&Service
- Lines: Bochum–Gelsenkirchen railway (KBS 428)
- Platforms: 2 side platforms
- Tracks: 2
- Train operators: VIAS

Construction
- Parking: no
- Cycle facilities: no
- Accessible: yes

Other information
- Station code: 725
- DS100 code: EBGZ
- IBNR: 8001035
- Category: 6
- Fare zone: VRR: 360
- Website: www.bahnhof.de

Services
| Preceding station | VIAS | Following station |
|---|---|---|
| Wanne-Eickel Hbf towards Gelsenkirchen Hbf | RB 46 | Bochum-Hamme towards Bochum Hbf |
Location
- Location within North Rhine-Westphalia Location within Germany Location within Europe

Bochum-Riemke station (German: Haltepunkt Bochum-Riemke) is a railway station in the municipality of Bochum, North Rhine-Westphalia, Germany. The station has two side platforms, and is served by 80 Glückauf-Bahn regional trains per day (half of that on weekends). In addition, many freight trains run on the route, especially at night. It was originally named Bochum-Graetz, then Bochum-Nokia from 1993 to 2009.

== Rail services ==
| Line | Name | Route |
|---|---|---|
| RB 46 | Glückauf-Bahn | Gelsenkirchen Hauptbahnhof – Wanne-Eickel Hauptbahnhof – Bochum-Riemke – Bochum Hauptbahnhof |
