= Rhein-Emscher-Express =

Regional-Express service in North Rhine-Westphalia, Germany

RE 3 Rhein-Emscher-Express
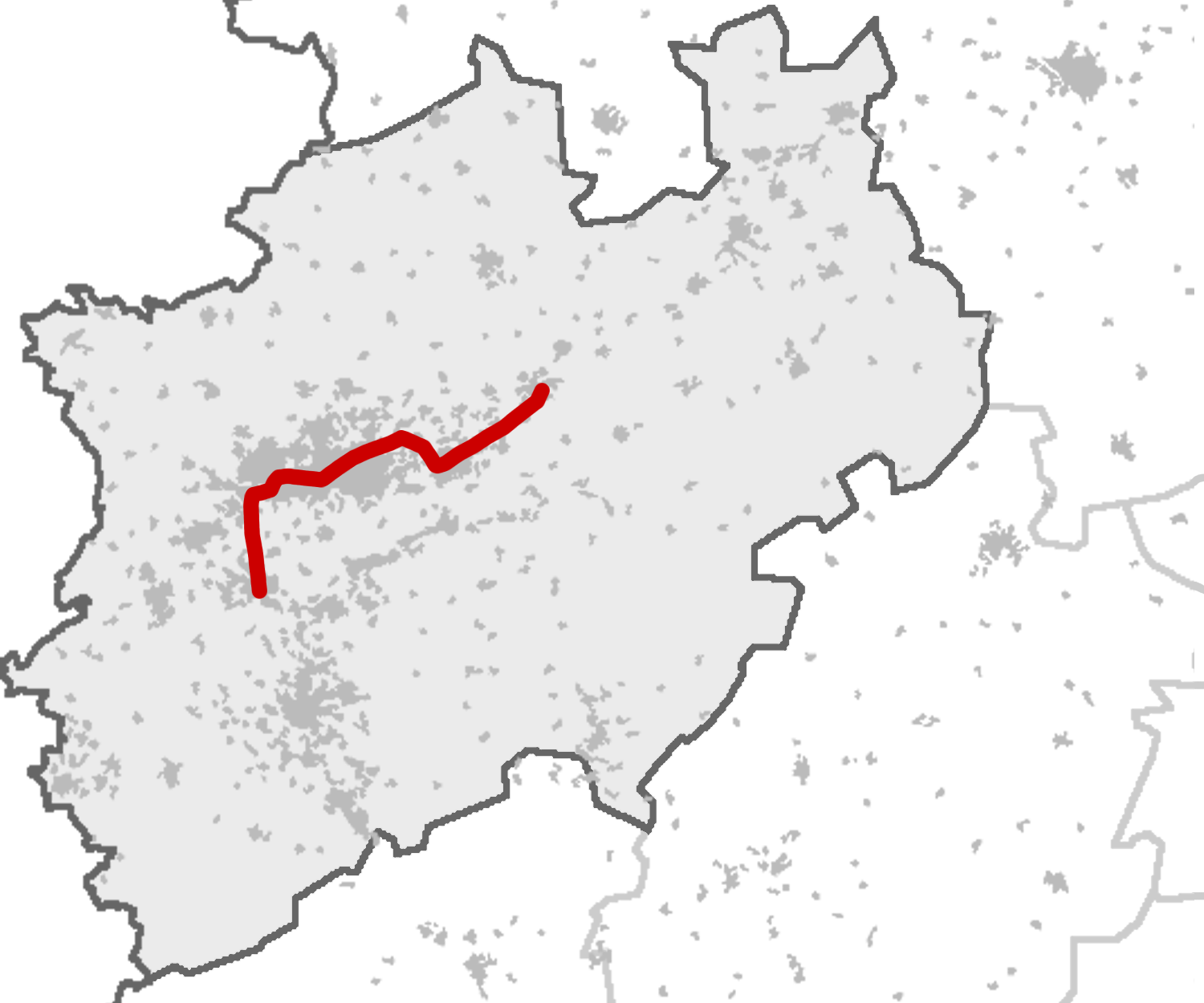
- Service route

Overview
- Locale: North Rhine-Westphalia, Germany

Service
- Route number: 416

Technical
- Line length: 109 km (68 mi)
- Operating speed: 160 km/h (99 mph) (maximum)

The Rhein-Emscher-Express (RE 3) is a Regional-Express service in the German state of North Rhine-Westphalia (NRW), running from Düsseldorf via Duisburg, Gelsenkirchen and Dortmund to Hamm. It connects with the rest of the regional rail network of NRW in Düsseldorf, Duisburg, Oberhausen, Wanne-Eickel, Dortmund and Hamm. In addition, it connects in Düsseldorf, Duisburg, Oberhausen, Dortmund and Hamm with long-distance services.

== History ==
The Rhein-Emscher-Express has been operating since the introduction of the integrated regular interval timetable in North Rhine-Westphalia (called NRW-Takt) in 1998. It first ran from Mönchengladbach via Krefeld, Duisburg, Gelsenkirchen and Dortmund to Hamm. The Duisburg–Mönchengladbach section was dropped in exchange for an extension from Duisburg to Düsseldorf in the timetable change in December 2002. Since then the Rhein-Emscher-Express has run entirely on the trunk line of the Cologne-Minden Railway Company, which was opened in 1846 and 1847.

As of 15 December 2019, in connection with a change to the Rhein-Ruhr S-Bahn, a new Regionalbahn service line RB 32, the Rhein-Emscher-Bahn, was added to the timetable, which runs parallel to the RE 3 between Dortmund and Duisburg, serving the stops between Gelsenkirchen and Oberhausen that were formally served by a branch of S-Bahn line S 2, including Essen Zollverein Nord.

== Route ==
The Rhine-Emscher-Express runs daily every hour over the tracks of three railway lines:

- The whole Dortmund–Hamm railway, which is also used by three other Regional-Express services and long-distance trains,
- the whole Duisburg–Dortmund railway, shared with the Rhein-Emscher-Bahn (RB 32) and partly with the Emscher-Niederrhein-Bahn (RB 35) and S-Bahn line S 2,
- The Cologne–Duisburg railway between Duisburg and Düsseldorf. In this four to six track section, the Rhein- Emscher-Express uses the S-Bahn tracks or the so-called "local" tracks where they exist, along with the Rhein-Haard-Express (RE 2), the Rhein-Weser-Express (RE 6), the Rhein-Hellweg-Express (RE 11) and the Rhein-IJssel-Express (RE 19). Only the NRW-Express (RE 1) and the Rhein-Express (RE 5) use the long-distance tracks.

== Rail services ==
The RE 3 runs hourly every day from Düsseldorf to Hamm. It runs parallel with Rhine-Ruhr S-Bahn lines over large parts of its route and it has some of the character of a fast S-Bahn service and is perceived by passengers accordingly. RB 32, the Rhein-Emscher-Bahn, runs parallel to the RE 3 between Dortmund and Duisburg each hour, also stopping at Essen Zollverein Nord, Essen-Bergeborbeck and Essen-Dellwig.

The passenger rail transport was operated by DB Regio NRW until 12 December 2009, using class 425 electric multiple units in coupled sets since the introduction of the winter timetable of 2008. Previously the service had been operated with push–pull trains of five refurbished Silberling carriages or four double-deck carriages with a class 111 electric locomotive. The average speed is only 63 km/h. The reason for this is the frequent stops between Dortmund and Hamm.

The current operator of this service and the Maas-Wupper-Express is Eurobahn, a subsidiary of Keolis. Operations are carried out using 4 four-carriage and 14 five-carriage Stadler FLIRT electrical multiple units with a top speed of 160 km/h, rented from Angel Trains.

In the period from 13 December 2009 to 11 December 2010 (during RUHR.2010, when Essen was a European Capital of Culture), the RE 3 had an additional stop at Essen-Zollverein Nord (formerly Essen-Katernberg Süd) to improve access to the World Heritage Site at the Zollverein Coal Mine Industrial Complex. On 7 January 2010, the station was officially renamed Essen-Zollverein Nord, but since the timetable change in December 2010, Rhein-Emscher-Express services again skip the station.

== Operator ==
Two North Rhine-Westphalian municipal transport associations, the Verkehrsverbund Rhein-Ruhr ("Rhine-Ruhr Transport Association", VRR) and the Verkehrsgemeinschaft Ruhr-Lippe ("transport community of Westphalia-Lippe", ZRL) are involved in the operation of the service. The franchise for operating the service together with the Maas-Wupper-Express from the timetable change on 13 December 2009 was put out to tender. The winner was Rhenus Keolis GmbH, beating Abellio Rail NRW, DB Regio NRW GmbH and other railway companies.

== See also ==
- List of regional rail lines in North Rhine-Westphalia
- List of scheduled railway routes in Germany
