= Gelsenkirchen Hauptbahnhof =

Railway station in Gelsenkirchen, Germany

Gelsenkirchen Hbf
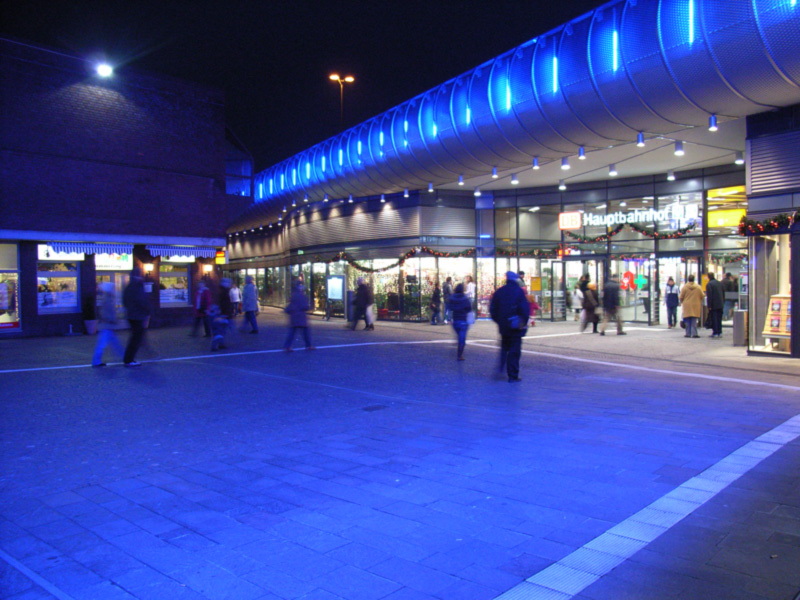
- Gelsenkirchen Hauptbahnhof main entrance

General information
- Location: Gelsenkirchen, North Rhine-Westphalia; Germany
- Coordinates: 51°30′16″N 7°6′5″E
- Owner: Deutsche Bahn
- Operator: DB Netz; DB Station&Service
- Lines: Duisburg–Dortmund; Essen–Gelsenkirchen; Bochum–Gelsenkirchen; S-Bahn
- Platforms: 6
- Train operators: Abellio Rail NRW; DB Fernverkehr; DB Regio NRW eurobahn
- Connections: Trams: 107 301 302

Construction
- Accessible: Yes

Other information
- Station code: 2052
- DS100 code: EG
- IBNR: 8000118
- Category: 2
- Fare zone: VRR: 260
- Website: www.bahnhof.de

History
- Opened: 15 May 1847

Passengers
- ca. 17,500
Services
Preceding station	DB Fernverkehr	Following station
Essen Hbf towards Köln Hbf	ICE 33	Recklinghausen Hbf towards Westerland (Sylt)
Oberhausen Hbf towards Koblenz Hbf	IC 35	Wanne-Eickel Hbf towards Emden Hbf
Essen Hbf towards Graz Hbf	ICE 62	Recklinghausen Hbf towards Münster Hbf
Preceding station		Following station
Essen Hbf towards Köln Hbf	FLX 20	Münster Hbf towards Hamburg Hbf
Preceding station	DB Regio NRW	Following station
Essen Hbf towards Düsseldorf Hbf	RE 2	Wanne-Eickel Hbf towards Osnabrück Hbf
Essen Hbf towards Mönchengladbach Hbf	RE 42	Wanne-Eickel Hbf towards Münster Hbf
Essen Zollverein Nord towards Duisburg Hbf	RB 32	Wanne-Eickel Hbf towards Dortmund Hbf
Preceding station		Following station
Essen-Atlenessen towards Düsseldorf Hbf	RE 3	Wanne-Eickel Hbf towards Hamm (Westf) Hbf
Preceding station	VIAS	Following station
Essen Zollverein Nord towards Mönchengladbach Hbf	RB 35	Terminus
Terminus	RB 46	Wanne-Eickel Hbf towards Bochum Hbf
Preceding station	Rhine-Ruhr S-Bahn	Following station
Gelsenkirchen-Rotthausen towards Essen Hbf	S2	Wanne-Eickel Hbf towards Dortmund Hbf
Location

Gelsenkirchen Hauptbahnhof is a railway station in the German city of Gelsenkirchen. It connects the city to the regional and long-distance rail service of Deutsche Bahn and other railway companies in Germany.

== History ==
The Gelsenkirchen railway station was opened in 1847 with the Cologne-Minden railway. The station has since been rebuilt twice. The first time was in 1904, because the capacity of the old station was no longer sufficient. Since then the station has been a Hauptbahnhof (lit. Central Station). As part of this construction project, the tracks, which were located at ground level at the time, were raised. This allowed for traffic to Bochum to freely pass through. The second new development was carried out from 1982 to 1983. In preparations for the 2006 FIFA World Cup the station underwent extensive renovations.

On 4 August 1914, English civilian Henry Hadley was fatally shot by a German officer while their train was standing at the station. Dying the next day, shortly after war was declared, he is sometimes described as the "first British casualty" of World War I.

== Operational usage ==
The station has connect to the InterCity trains towards Norddeich Mole via Münster and Luxembourg via Cologne. To the week-end, even some ICE-trains connecting Munich or Hamburg stop here. It is also an important connection point for RegionalExpress and RegionalBahn lines to Hamm, Düsseldorf, Münster and Essen and has a S-Bahn line of the Rhein-Ruhr S-Bahn calling at the station. The Stadtbahn station below the Hauptbahnhof offers local connections by tram to GE-Buer/Horst, Bochum and Essen.

== Lines ==
=== Long-distance ===
In the 2026 timetable, the following long-distance service stopped at the station:

Line	Route	Frequency
ICE 14	Cologne – Düsseldorf – Duisburg – Essen – Gelsenkirchen – Recklinghausen – Münster – Osnabrück – Hannover – Wolfsburg – Berlin	One train pair
ICE 33	Westerland – Niebüll – Itzehoe – Hamburg – Bremen – Osnabrück – Münster – Gelsenkirchen – Essen – Düsseldorf – Cologne	1 train pair
IC 35	(Norddeich Mole –) or (Emden Außenhafen –) Emden – Leer – Münster – Recklinghausen – Wanne-Eickel – Gelsenkirchen – Oberhausen – Duisburg – Düsseldorf – Cologne	Every 2 hours
ICE 62	Münster – Recklinghausen – Gelsenkirchen – Essen – Duisburg – Düsseldorf – Köln Messe/Deutz – Frankfurt Airport – Mannheim – Stuttgart – Ulm – Augsburg – Munich – Salzburg – Klagenfurt – Graz	1 train pair

=== Regional ===
Wanne-Eickel is served by the two Regional-Express and three Regionalbahn lines, as well as the Rhine-Ruhr S-Bahn. In the 2026 timetable, the following regional services stopped at the station:

Line	Line name	Route
RE 2	Rhein-Haard-Express	Düsseldorf – Duisburg – Essen – Gelsenkirchen – Wanne-Eickel – Recklinghausen – Münster (Westf) – Osnabrück
RE 3	Rhein-Emscher-Express	Düsseldorf – Duisburg – Oberhausen – Gelsenkirchen – Wanne-Eickel – Herne – Dortmund – Hamm
RE 42	Niers-Haard-Express	Mönchengladbach – Krefeld – Essen – Gelsenkirchen – Wanne-Eickel – Recklinghausen – Haltern – Münster (Westf)
RB 32	Rhein-Emscher-Bahn	Duisburg – Essen-Altenessen – Gelsenkirchen – Wanne-Eickel – Castrop-Rauxel – Dortmund
RB 35	Emscher-Niederrhein-Bahn	Gelsenkirchen – Oberhausen – Duisburg – Krefeld – Mönchengladbach
RB 46	Glückauf-Bahn	Gelsenkirchen – Wanne-Eickel – Bochum
S2	Rhine-Ruhr S-Bahn	Essen – Gelsenkirchen – Wanne-Eickel – Herne – Dortmund

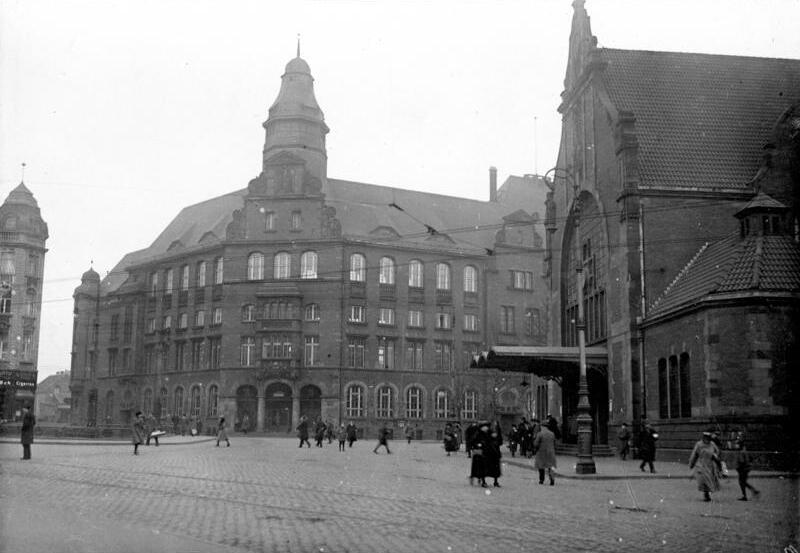
The station and main post office in 1924

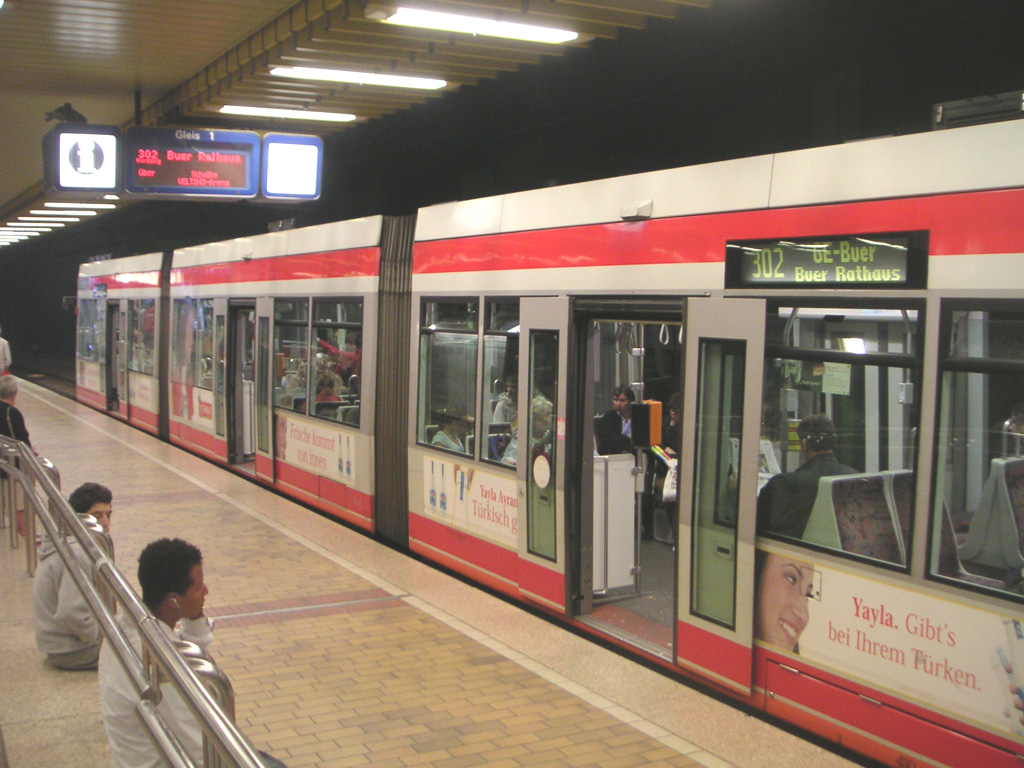
Underground Stadtbahn platforms at Gelsenkirchen Hauptbahnhof

== See also ==
- Rail transport in Germany
- Railway stations in Germany
