= Duisburg–Dortmund railway =

Major railway line in Germany

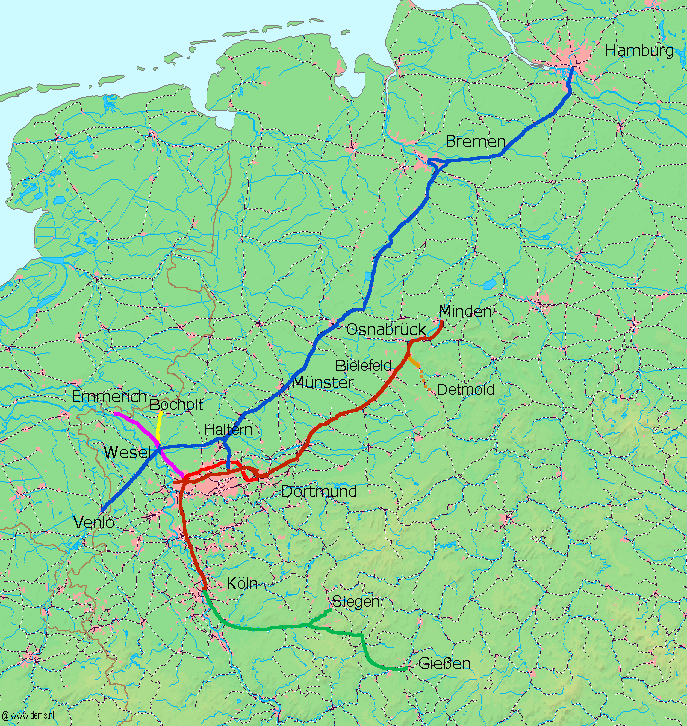
- Cologne-Minden trunk line in red

Overview
- Line number: 2650
- Locale: North Rhine-Westphalia, Germany

Service
- Route number: 416 (Long distance); 450.2 (S-Bahn)

Technical
- Line length: 56 km (35 mi)
- Track gauge: 1,435 mm (4 ft 8 1/2 in) standard gauge
- Electrification: 15 kV/16.7 Hz AC overhead catenary
- Operating speed: 140 km/h (87.0 mph) (maximum)

The Duisburg-Dortmund Railway is an important and historically significant railway in Germany. It is a major axis for long distance and regional passenger freight transport in the northern Ruhr. It is served by Intercity-Express, InterCity, Regional-Express, Regionalbahn and S-Bahn trains. It includes the central stations of Duisburg, Oberhausen, Gelsenkirchen, Dortmund and Wanne-Eickel and the regionally important stations of Essen-Altenessen and Herne. It is the middle section of the Cologne-Minden trunk line from Cologne-Deutz to Minden. It was opened in 1847 and has been modernised and developed several times since then. Today, it has two to four tracks and is electrified and classified as a main line.

== History ==
On 18 December 1843, the Prussian government granted a concession to the trunk line to the Cologne-Minden Railway Company (German, old spelling: Cöln-Mindener Eisenbahn-Gesellschaft, CME) for the line, which began at what was then the CME station in Deutz (now a suburb of Cologne) with the construction of the first section to Düsseldorf, which was opened on 20 December 1845. Only a few weeks later, on 9 February 1846, the second section was completed to a temporary terminus at the site of present-day Duisburg Hauptbahnhof called the Cologne-Minden railway station, the first of three train stations built at the same place.

The route of the next section to Oberhausen, Altenessen, Gelsenkirchen, Wanne, Herne and Dortmund to Hamm was chosen over a route close to the coal mines that were then located on the north bank of the Ruhr because it was cheaper to build as it largely avoided hills. Nevertheless, it still took well over a year until 15 May 1847 for this section to be completed and put into operation. On 15 October 1847 the last section was opened to Minden, thus completing the entire 263 kilometre long, single track railway. On the same day the Royal Hanoverian State Railways opened its Hanover-Minden Railway, completing a connection to Berlin and northeastern Germany.

=== Branch line to Duisburg-Ruhrort ===
In 1848 the CME built a branch line to the docks at Ruhrort from Oberhausen station and agreed with the Aachen-Düsseldorf-Ruhrort Railway Company (Aachen-Düsseldorf-Ruhrorter Eisenbahn-Gesellschaft) to construct the Ruhrort-Homberg train ferry.

=== Holland line ===
The Oberhausen Station was also at the beginning of a line opened on 20 October 1856 to Arnhem via Wesel and Emmerich am Rhein, popularly known as the Holland line.

=== Rollbahn ===
Wanne station (now Wanne-Eickel Hbf) was from 1 January 1870, the starting point for a line to Hamburg called the Rollbahn (Rolling Line). This line along the German North Sea coast was part of the Paris-Hamburg Railway, linking with the CME’s concession from the Prussian government for a Hamburg-Venlo railway.

=== Emscher Valley Railway ===
From 1871 to 1878 the CME built another line from Duisburg to Dortmund along the Emscher valley largely parallel to its trunk line via Osterfeld Süd and Wanne through the northern Ruhr to service the growing industries and prosperous coal mines.

== Current situation ==
Since the railway line was opened from Duisburg to Dortmund it has grown in importance as the centre of coal mining in the Ruhr has migrated north and it has continually been modernized. Today the line is at least double track and electrified for its entire length. The route is now comparable to the other east-west line, in particular the central Ruhr trunk line of the former Bergisch-Märkische Railway Company.

== Services ==
Long distance trains only use parts of the line. The section from Duisburg to Oberhausen is served by Intercity-Express trains to and from Amsterdam. It is also served by Regional-Express trains on line RE 5 (Rhein-Express), terminating in Wesel, and RE19 (Rhein-IJssel-Express), terminating in Arnhem, and Regionalbahn line RB 35 (Emscher-Niederrhein-Bahn) between Gelsenkirchen and Mönchengladbach. Every two hours InterCity line 35 uses a large part of the line from Duisburg to Wanne-Eickel. In addition occasional trains of IC line 32, and at-least hourly regional services on lines RE 2 (Rhein-Haard-Express), RB 42 (Haard-Bahn) and RB 46 (Glückauf-Bahn) use the section from Gelsenkirchen to Wanne-Eickel.

The only Regional-Express service that uses the total length of the route is RE 3 Rhein-Emscher Express, which runs from Düsseldorf to Hamm, all on the route of the trunk line of the Cologne-Minden Railway Company.

S-Bahn line S 2 runs at 30-minute intervals between Herne and Dortmund Mengede and continues to Dortmund via the Southern route of the former Royal Westphalian Railway Company (Königlich-Westfälische Eisenbahn-Gesellschaft). West of Herne, one train per hour connects to Recklinghausen and one connects via Gelsenkirchen to Essen. Formerly another S-Bahn service per hour ran along the entire historic route between Duisburg and Dortmund. Since December 2019, this has operated as the RB 32 (Rhein-Emscher-Bahn), but running only on the Duisburg–Dortmund railway route, skipping the stations between Dortmund-Mengede and Dortmund. This is complemented by the RB 35 Emscher-Niederrhein-Bahn between Duisburg and Gelsenkirchen from Monday to Friday between 5 a.m. and 7 p.m. The RB 32 and RB 35 services stop at all stations between Duisburg and Gelsenkirchen, like the former S 2 service.
