= Gustav Knepper Power Station =

Former coal power plant in Germany

Coordinates: 51°34′06″N 7°20′56″E

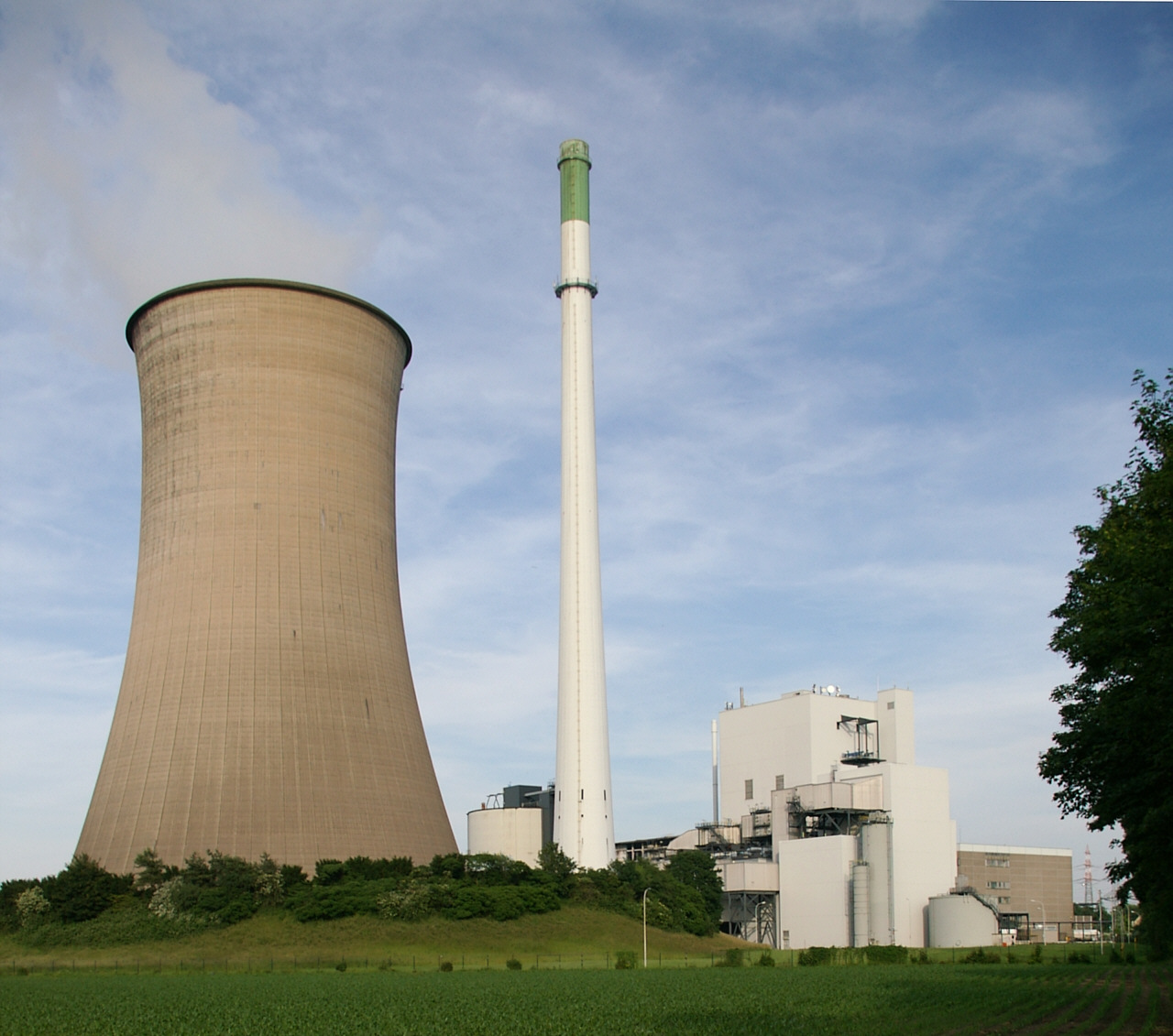
Gustav Knepper Power Station

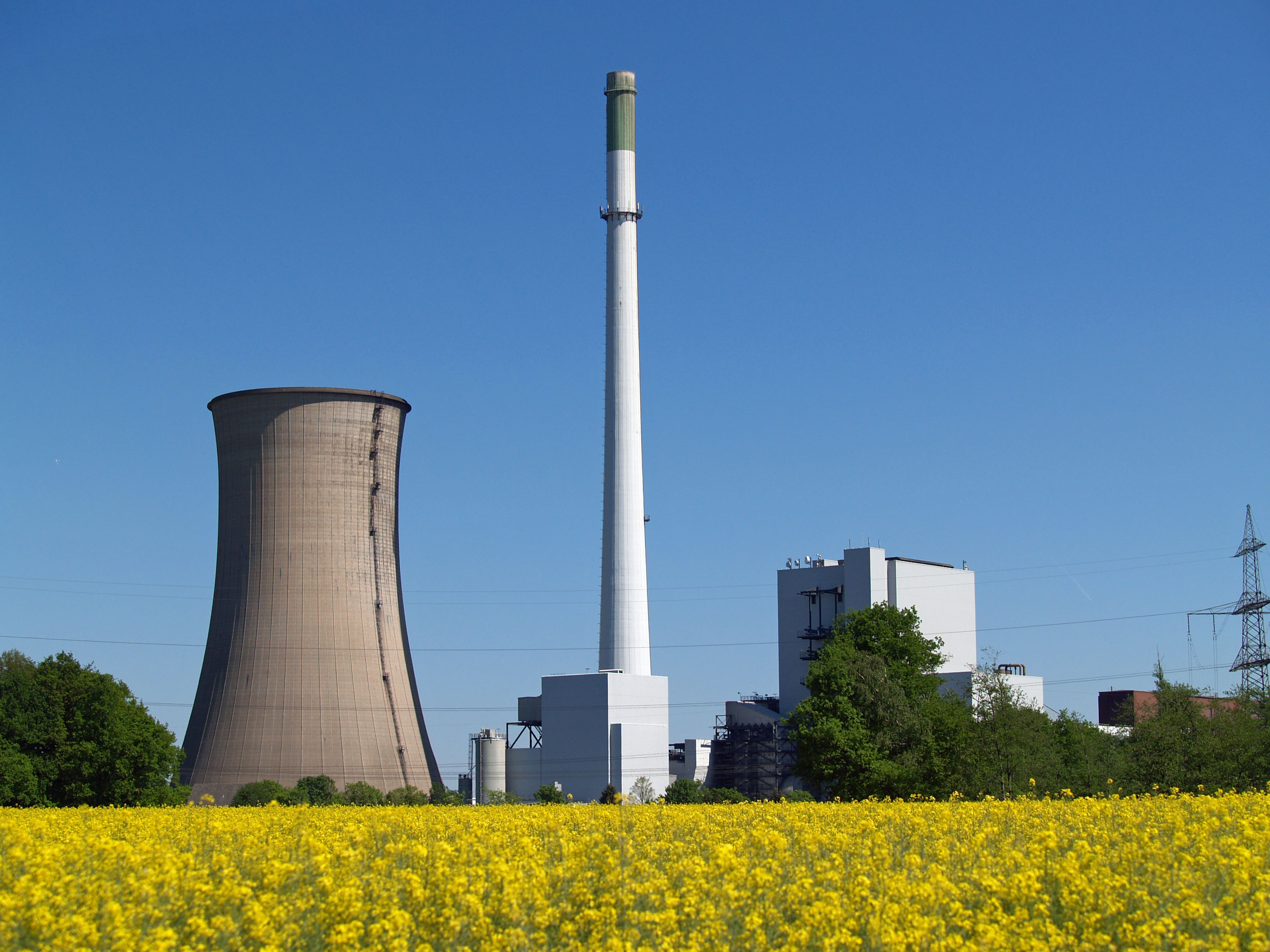
The power station

Gustav Knepper Power Station was a coal-fired power station in Dortmund-Mengede in Germany, close to Castrop-Rauxel. It started operation in 1971 and ended on December 23, 2014.

The power station was built at the former Gustav Knepper coal mine. The first owner of the Power Station was the Gelsenkirchener Bergwerks AG. It was then taken over by the Bochumer Bergwerks AG

The power station was demolished on February 17, 2019.
