= Wanne, Germany =

- Stadtteil of Tübingen
- Interactive map of Wanne, Germany
- Location within Germany Location within Baden-Württemberg
- Coordinates: 48.537°N 9.045°E
- Country: Germany
- State: Baden-Württemberg
- Admin. region: Tübingen
- Town: Tübingen

Population (2022)
  - Total: 5,665
- Time zone: UTC+01:00 (CET)
  - Summer (DST): UTC+02:00 (CEST)
- Postal codes: 72076
- Vehicle registration: TÜ

Wanne (German pronunciation: [ˈvanə]) is a residential area in the northern outskirts of the city of Tübingen, Germany. It is situated on a south-facing slope. To the north of Wanne lies the nature protection area of the Schönbuch.

== Description ==
The district borders Waldhäuser Ost and Schönblick/Winkelwiese to the east and the university district to the south and west. In the north, the district extends to the Goldersbach river.

The area consists mainly of housing built 1980s. Wanne is popular as a residential area because of its vicinity to the nature reserve, its elevation and southern exposure. It is also a popular location for people working at the Morgenstelle, a large complex of university buildings on the opposite slope, and at the cluster of university hospitals south of the complex. However, Wanne lacks shops and is not well connected to the historic city center of Tübingen.
