= Welver–Sterkrade railway =

Railway line in Germany

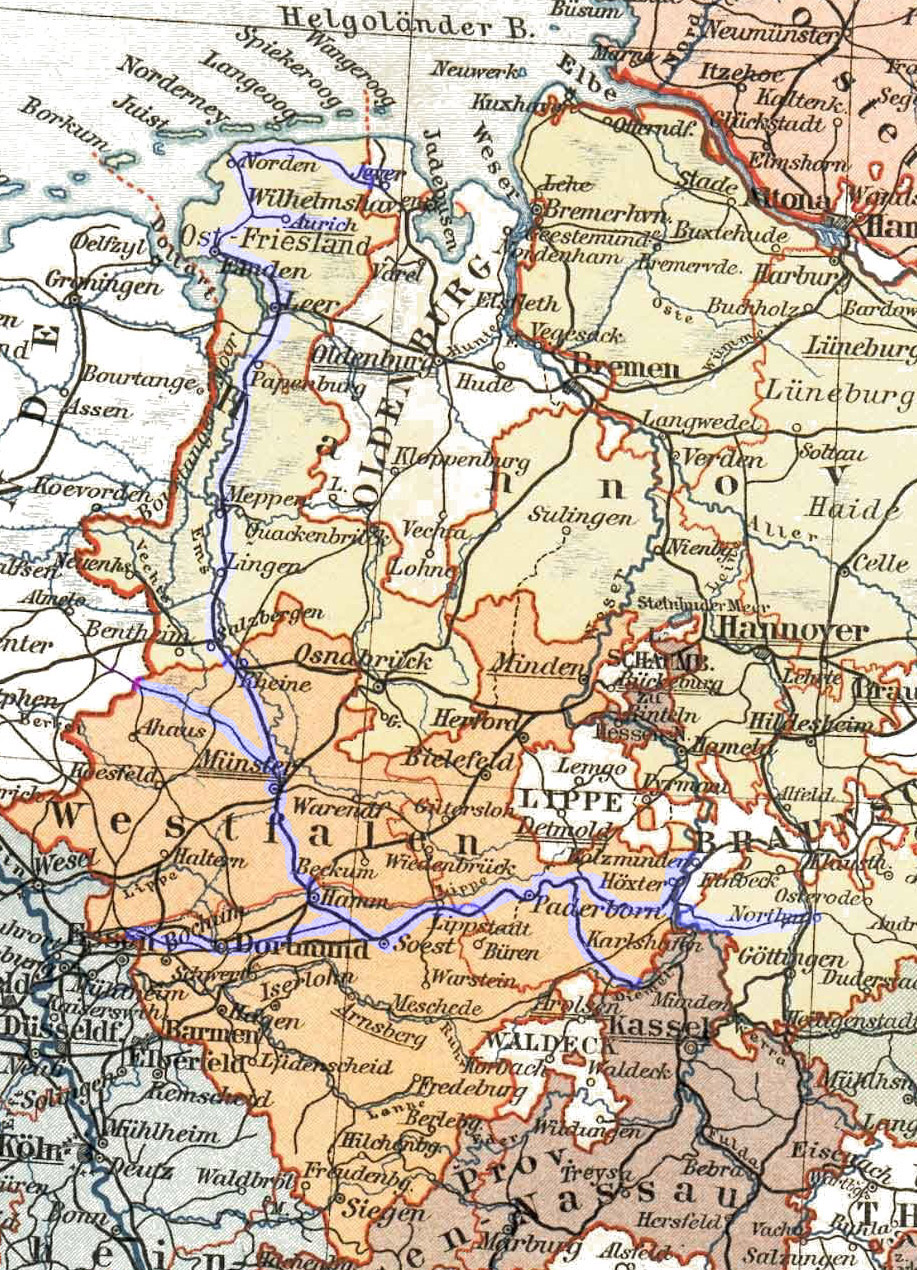
- Network of the Royal Westphalian Railway Company

Overview
- Other name(s): Westphalian Emscher Valley Railway
- Native name: Westfälische Emschertalbahn
- Line number: 2112 (Welver–Dortmund Süd); 2135 (Dortmund Süd–Bodelschwingh); 2136 (Bodelschwingh–Mengede); "16" (Bodelschwingh–Bismarck); 2246 (Bismarck–Osterfeld); "18" (Osterfeld–Sterkrade); 2126, 2191 (S-Bahn)
- Locale: North Rhine-Westphalia, Germany
- Termini: Welver; Sterkrade

Service
- Route number: 450.2, 450.4 (S-Bahn)

Technical
- Line length: 27.5 km (17.1 mi) (S-Bahn); formerly 86.5 km (53.7 mi)
- Track gauge: 1,435 mm (4 ft 8 1/2 in) standard gauge
- Electrification: 15 kV/16.7 Hz AC overhead catenary
- Operating speed: 100 km/h (62.1 mph) (maximum)

The Welver–Sterkrade railway is a former through railway line from the Westphalian town of Welver to Sterkrade in the western Ruhr region in Germany, which is now broken into four disconnected sections. Because its route ran along the Emscher river it was known as the Westphalian Emscher Valley Railway.

The sections from Unna-Königsborn to the former Dortmund South station and from Dortmund-Dorstfeld to Dortmund-Mengede is now an entirely two-track electrified railway and is served by the Rhine-Ruhr S-Bahn (lines S 2 and S 4). There are two sections, each of only a few kilometres, in Gelsenkirchen and in Bottrop and Oberhausen, which have traditionally been used exclusively for freight.

== History ==
The line was built by the Royal Westphalian Railway Company (German: Königlich-Westfälische Eisenbahn, KWE) to connect its network, which at that time mostly ran through northern and eastern Westphalia, to the Ruhr area in the west in order to serve the lucrative traffic from its coal mines and factories.

=== Welver–Dortmund ===
As early as 1847 the Cologne-Minden Railway Company (Cöln-Mindener Eisenbahn-Gesellschaft, CME) had opened the Dortmund-Hamm leg of its trunk line. To its south the Bergisch-Märkische Railway Company (Bergisch-Märkische Eisenbahn-Gesellschaft, BME) opened the parallel Dortmund–Soest line in 1855.

The KWE built its own line from Welver on its Hamm–Warburg line between the two existing routes and on 15 May 1876 it opened the first section to Dortmund. The Westphalian station in Dortmund was next to the Rhenish station, built two years earlier by the Rhenish Railway Company (Rheinische Eisenbahn-Gesellschaft, RhE) at the end of its line along the Wupper from Düsseldorf and its line along the Ruhr from Osterath. After the nationalisation of the railway companies in the early 1880s, the KWE and RhE stations were amalgamated as Dortmund South Station, which was largely destroyed in World War II and is now abandoned.

=== Dortmund–Mengede ===
On 19 November 1874, the RhE opened the last part of its Ruhr line from Dorstfeld for passengers. On 1 September 1878, the KWE opened a freight line, initially running parallel to the RhE line from the joint Dortmund station to Dorstfeld and then continuing via Huckarde KWE (renamed Dortmund-Huckarde Sud station in 1920) and Bodelschwingh KWE (later renamed Dortmund-Bodelschwingh and now demolished) to Mengede (now Dortmund-Mengede).

The KWE built the connection to Mengede station, which had been built by the CME as part of the Duisburg–Dortmund section of its trunk line in 1848, as a branch line to connect with the CME network, adding to the connection already established at Hamm.

=== Bodelschwingh–Sterkrade ===
A further extension was opened as follows:

- Route "16": 20 August 1879 (freight) Bodelschwingh–Crange

(route shared with of the Bergisch-Märkische Railway Company line—now route 2153—from Crange to Bismarck)

- Route 2246: 12 February 1879 (freight) Bismarck–Hugo
- Route 2246: 20 August 1879 (freight) Hugo–Horst Nord
- Route 2246: 12 November 1879 (freight) Horst Nord–Osterfeld KWE
- Route "18": 15 March 1880 (freight) Osterfeld KWE–Sterkrade KWE

== Closures ==
Several sections of the line were closed shortly after the acquisition of the nominally private railway companies by the Prussian state railways.

=== Bodelschwingh–Bismarck ===
The section in between Bodelschwingh and Crange was closed on 1 July 1882.

The tracks between Castrop-Pöppinghausen and Herne initially continued to be used as a connection to the former Frederick the Great colliery, as well as a connection to the lines to the colliery’s no. 3, 4 and 6 pits and the line to no. 1 and 2 pits.

This section was not fully dismantled until 1892. In 1906, the branch canal of the Dortmund–Ems Canal was built on the route. The northern part of it is now part of the Rhine–Herne Canal, while the southern part has been filled in and its route was used for the construction of the A 42 autobahn.

=== Horst–Sterkrade ===
The section between Horst (Nord) and Sterkrade was closed on 15 October 1884 and completely dismantled by 1892.

The Hamm-Osterfeld line was built on the section between Horst and Osterfeld from 1 October 1901 and later put into operation. A section near Bottrop Hauptbahnhof was closed in 1968 and 1983 and partly sold, and the Bottrop freight yard was closed.

The route between the Oberhausen districts of Osterfeld and Sterkrade was along the Westfälischen Straße and the Richard-Wagner-Allee.

=== Welver–Königsborn ===
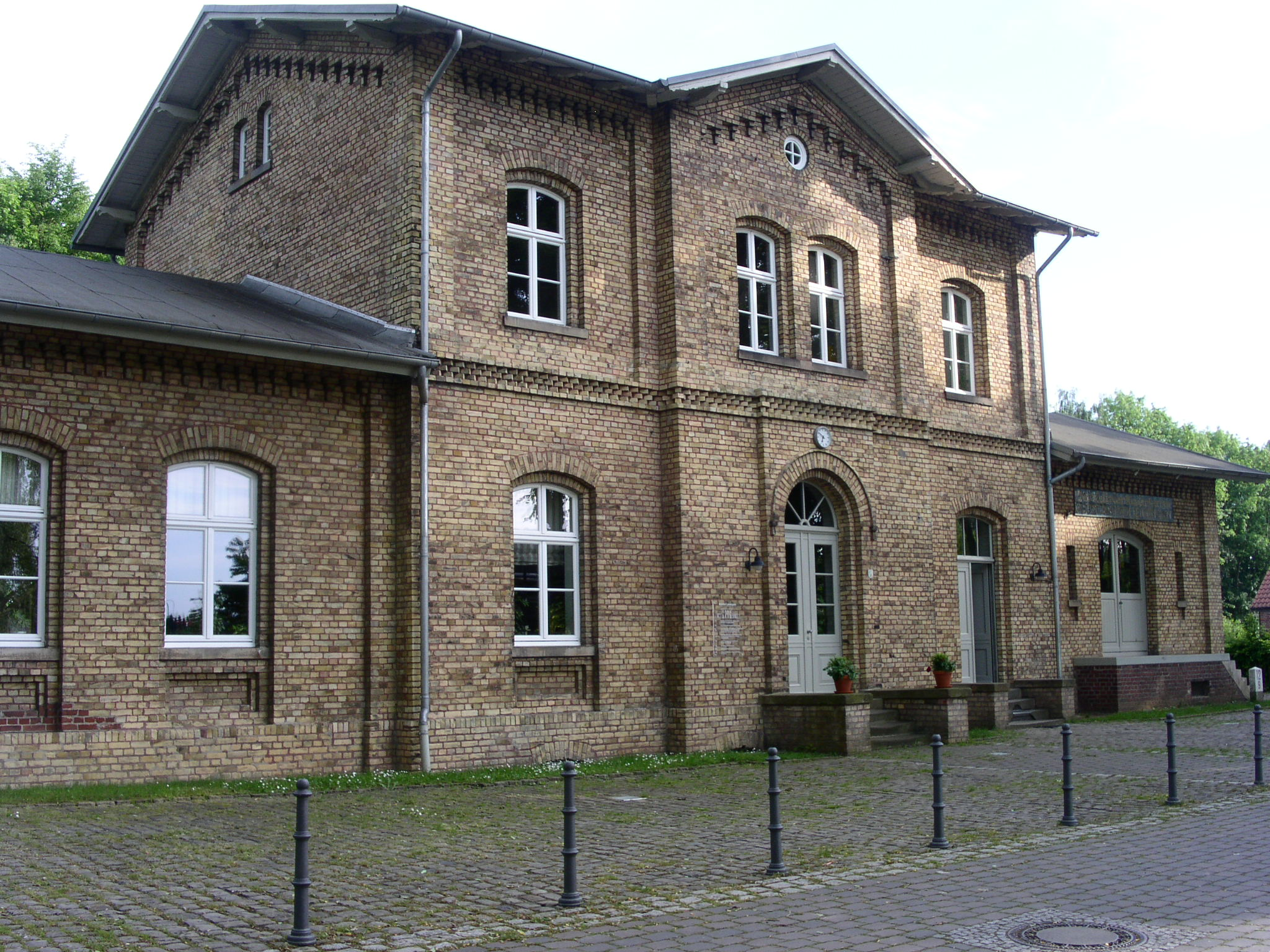
Renovated entrance building at Lenningsen station (2005)

The eastern section from Welver to Königsborn was closed on 29 September 1968 and dismantled. Its western section was converted into a trail. A kindergarten was set up in the renovated entrance hall of Lenningsen station.

== Current situation ==
The sections between Unna-Königsborn and Dortmund South station and between Dortmund-Dorstfeld and Dortmund-Mengede, together with the RhE section between Dortmund South station and Dortmund-Dorstfeld were completely redeveloped in the 1990s for the Rhine-Ruhr S-Bahn.

Today, line S 4 runs on the stretch from Unna-Königsborn to Dortmund Dorstfeld, and line S 2 on the stretch from Dortmund-Dorstfeld to Dortmund-Mengede. Both lines run every 30 minutes in normal hours.

The Gelsenkirchen-Bismarck–Hugo junction–Gelsenkirchen-Horst section is now a single-track non-electrified freight line and connects to the network of RBH Logistics GmbH (now part of DB Schenker Rail).

The section between Bottrop Hbf and Oberhausen-Osterfeld Süd freight yard is now part of the Oberhausen-Osterfeld Süd–Hamm line, a two-track electrified mainline freight railway.

== Planning ==
According to the plans of the Arnsberg region an S-Bahn station is to be built on the Dortmund–Hagen S-Bahn line (line S 5) at Dortmund West to provide interchange with the existing S 4 station on the Welver–Sterkrade line.

== Fares ==
Passenger transport on the sections that are still in operation sections are included in the Verkehrsverbund Rhein-Ruhr ("Rhine-Ruhr Transport Association", VRR).
