= S2 (Rhine-Ruhr S-Bahn) =

Railway service of the Rhine-Ruhr S-Bahn network

Line S2 is a S-Bahn line in the Rhein-Ruhr network. It starts in Dortmund Hauptbahnhof and runs westward. During weekdays one service per hour runs each to Essen Hauptbahnhof and Recklinghausen Hauptbahnhof using Stadler FLIRT 3XL units.

Line S2 runs over lines built by various railway companies:

- from Dortmund Hauptbahnhof to Dortmund-Dorstfeld over the Witten/Dortmund–Oberhausen/Duisburg railway, opened by the Bergisch-Märkische Railway Company in 1862
- from Dortmund-Dorstfeld to Dortmund-Mengede over the Welver–Sterkrade railway, built by the Royal Westphalian Railway Company on 1 September 1878.
- from Dortmund-Mengede to Gelsenkirchen Hauptbahnhof via Herne station over the Duisburg–Dortmund Railway opened by the Cologne-Minden Railway Company in 1847,
- from Gelsenkirchen to Essen over the Essen–Gelsenkirchen railway, opened from Gelsenkirchen to Essen-Kray Nord by the Rhenish Railway Company in 1872 and from Essen-Kray Nord to Essen Hauptbahnhof by the Prussian state railways in 1905,
- from Herne to Recklinghausen over tracks competed in October 1901 by Deutsche Reichsbahn and the Wanne-Eickel–Hamburg railway opened by the Cologne-Minden Railway Company in 1870.

S-Bahn services commenced between Dortmund and Duisburg on 2 June 1991. Services between Dortmund and Essen commenced on 29 September 1991. Services between Dortmund and Recklinghausen commenced on 24 May 1998. Services between Gelsenkirchen and Duisburg ended on 15 December 2019 and were replaced by the RB 32 (Rhein-Emscher-Bahn).
