= Cologne-Minden trunk line =

Railway line in Germany

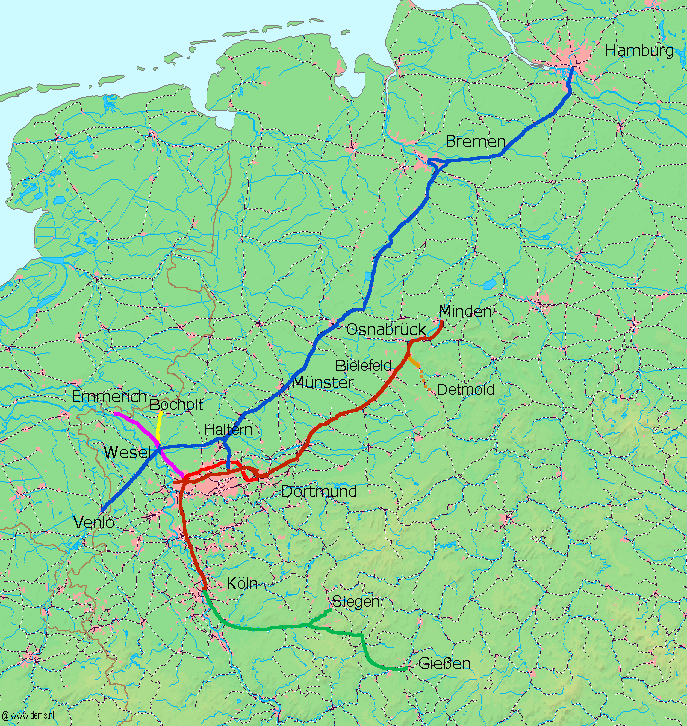
Cologne-Minden Railway Company network (nationalised in 1879), Cologne-Minden trunk line in dark red

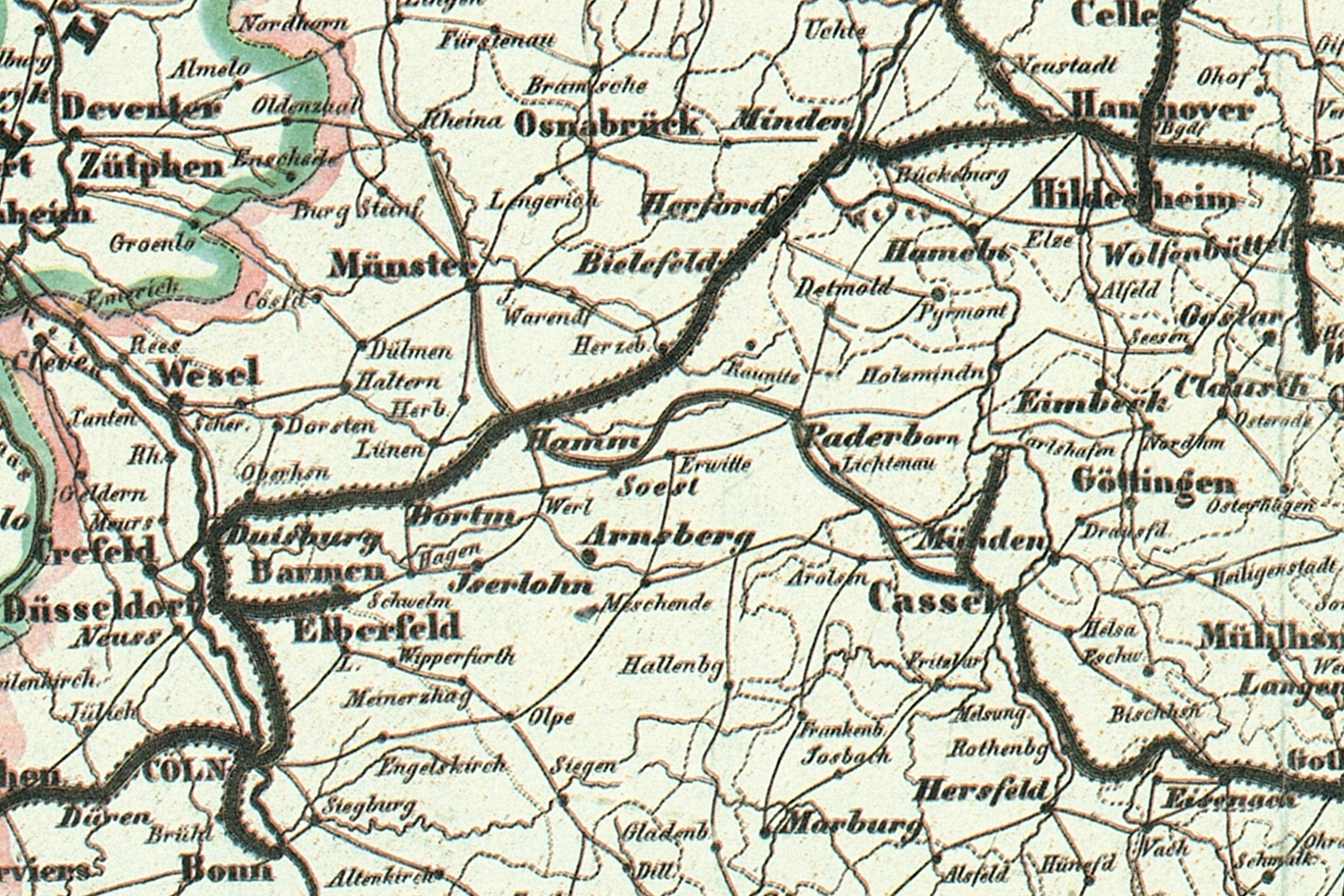
Mainline of the Cologne-Minden Railway Company from the 1849 German railway map

The Cologne-Minden trunk line is a railway built by the Cologne-Minden Railway Company (Cöln-Mindener Eisenbahn-Gesellschaft, CME). The line is the westernmost part of the railway line from Berlin to the Rhine that was proposed by Friedrich List in his Concept for a railway network in Germany, published in 1833. In fact, Friedrich Harkort (“father of the Ruhr”) had proposed the construction of a railway line from Cologne to Minden in 1825.

== History ==
On 18 December 1843, the CME was awarded the concession to build a railway line between the metropolis of Cologne, the cities of the Rhenish-Westphalian industrial area and Minden to connect with the network of the Royal Hanoverian State Railways.

A route through the Bergisches Land had been dropped was due to the high cost of the engineering structures that would have been required on the advice of the Aachen merchant and banker David Hansemann (1790-1864), who was then briefly Prussian Minister of Finance. Instead, the chosen route that bypassed the Bergisches Landran was selected. It ran from Deutz (now a suburb of Cologne) further north through Mülheim am Rhein, Düsseldorf, Duisburg, Oberhausen, Altenessen, Gelsenkirchen, Wanne, Herne and Castrop-Rauxel to Dortmund and on to Hamm, Oelde, Rheda, Bielefeld and Herford to Minden.

The first leg from Deutz to Düsseldorf opened on 20 December 1845. Only a few weeks later, on 9 February 1846, the second section was completed to a temporary terminus at the site of present-day Duisburg Hauptbahnhof called the Duisburg Cologne-Minden station, the first of three stations built on the same site. The next section from Duisburg to Hamm was opened on 15 May 1847. On 15 October 1847, the last section was opened to Minden, thus completing the entire 263 kilometre long, single track railway. The line with the Schildesche viaduct and other engineering structures were designed for eventual duplication.

=== Network developments in 1847/48 ===
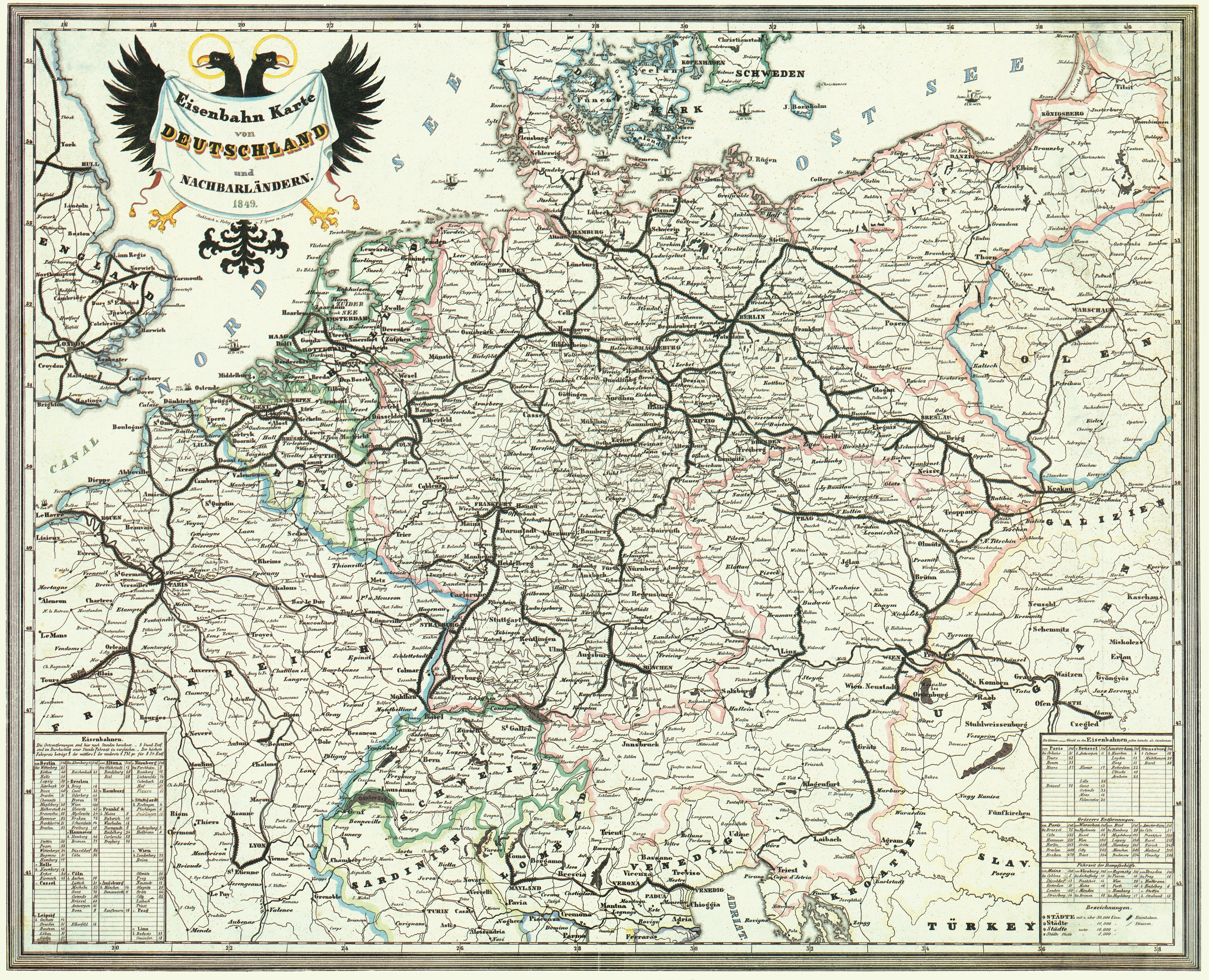
Railway Map of Germany and neighboring countries in 1849. Thin lines represent lines that were projected or under construction.

On the same day as its line opened to Minden, the Royal Hanoverian State Railways opened its Hanover–Minden line. On 1 September 1847 the Saxon-Silesian Railway Company opened a line connecting Görlitz with a branch of the Lower Silesian-Markish Railway. On 18 October 1847 the Upper Silesian Railway reached the border station of Mysłowice. On 13 October 1847 Kraków-Upper Silesian Railway opened. The opening of several hundred kilometres of railway lines in September and October 1847 together with other lines opened in the previous few years, created a continuous rail link from the Rhine via Brunswick, Oschersleben, Magdeburg, Dresden and Wrocław to the Vistula river. The lines from Berlin to Magdeburg and Wrocław were opened in the previous year, but until 1851 there was no rail connection between the various railway stations in Berlin. With the opening of a connecting line between the Wrocław stations on 3 February 1848, it was connected to the Upper Silesian Railway and the Kraków–Upper Silesian railway, creating a continuous rail link from Deutz to Kraków. Less than a year later on 1 September 1848, the William Railway (Wilhelmsbahn) was opened from Koźle to Bohumín (now in the Czech Republic, then in the Austrian Empire), closing the gap between the Upper Silesian Railway and the Austrian Northern Railway, which had opened to Bohumín on 1 April 1847. This created a continuous rail link between Cologne and Vienna.

== Current significance ==
In modern times the trunk line is no longer a continuous main line. The section between Duisburg and Dortmund is not a regular route for long-distance trains; instead through trains run on the more central Witten/Dortmund–Oberhausen/Duisburg line of the former Bergisch-Märkische Railway Company.

The line is now treated as four different lines as set out below with their current significance in terms of the number of trains running:

- Cologne–Duisburg line (extremely high)
- Duisburg–Dortmund line (Duisburg–Oberhausen and Gelsenkirchen–Wanne-Eickel: medium, otherwise low)
- Dortmund–Hamm line (high)
- Hamm–Minden line (very high)
