= Recklinghausen Hauptbahnhof =

Railway station in Recklinghausen, Germany

Recklinghausen Hbf
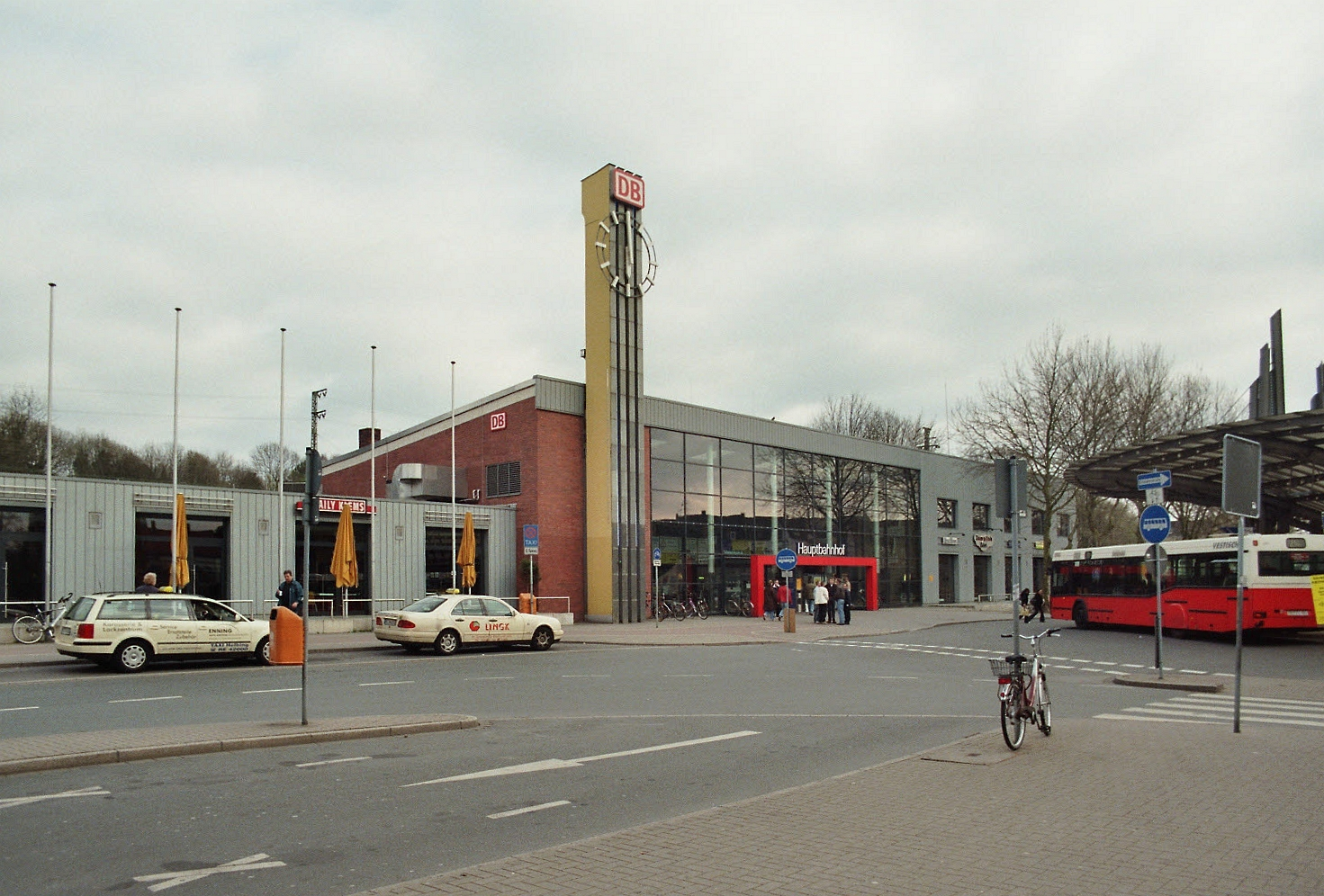
- Main entrance to station building

General information
- Location: Große Perdekamp Str. 2 Recklinghausen, NRW; Germany
- Coordinates: 51°36′58″N 7°12′11″E
- Owner: Deutsche Bahn
- Operator: DB Netz; DB Station&Service
- Line: Wanne-Eickel–Hamburg
- Platforms: 3

Construction
- Accessible: Yes

Other information
- Station code: 5160
- DS100 code: ERE
- IBNR: 00149
- Category: 3
- Fare zone: VRR: 170
- Website: www.bahnhof.de

History
- Opened: 1870

Key dates
- 1945: Destroyed
- 1998: Current structure built

Services
Preceding station	DB Fernverkehr	Following station
Wanne-Eickel Hbf towards Aachen Hbf	ICE 14	Münster Hbf One-way operation
Gelsenkirchen Hbf towards Köln Hbf	ICE 33	Münster Hbf towards Westerland (Sylt)
Wanne-Eickel Hbf towards Köln Hbf	IC 35	Münster Hbf towards Emden Hbf, Emden Außenhafen or Norddeich Mole
Gelsenkirchen Hbf towards Graz Hbf	ICE 62	Münster Hbf Terminus
Preceding station	DB Regio NRW	Following station
Wanne-Eickel Hbf towards Düsseldorf Hbf	RE 2	Marl-Sinsen towards Osnabrück Hbf
Recklinghausen Süd towards Bochum Hbf	RE 41	Marl-Sinsen towards Haltern am See
Recklinghausen Süd towards Mönchengladbach Hbf	RE 42	Marl-Sinsen towards Münster Hbf
Preceding station	Rhine-Ruhr S-Bahn	Following station
Terminus	S2	Recklinghausen Süd towards Dortmund Hbf
Terminus	S9	Herten (Westfalen) towards Hagen Hbf
Location

Recklinghausen Hauptbahnhof is a railway station for the city of Recklinghausen in Germany.

== History ==
The original station was opened in 1870 by the Cologne-Minden Railway Company as part of the construction of the Hamburg-Venlo railway.

During the Second World War, on 1 April 1945, a heavy bombing raid mostly destroyed the station and tracks. It is commemorated by the bunker built next to the station, in which the Kunsthalle Recklinghausen was established in 1950.

An outstanding feature of the architecture of the station building with its glass front is now the clock tower. The new bus station was built in 1998. Up until the renovation of the building, a plaque commemorating the 5000th kilometer of electrified rail of the Deutsche Bundesbahn was located in the station. The plaque has been missing since the completion of the renovation.

== See also ==
- Rail transport in Germany
- Railway stations in Germany
