= Duisburg-Meiderich Nord–Hohenbudberg railway =

Railway line in Germany

Overview
- Line number: 2331 (Walzwerk–Meerbeck); 2333 (DU-Baerl–Hohenbudberg)
- Locale: North Rhine-Westphalia, Rhineland-Palatinate, Hesse, Germany

Service
- Route number: only freight; last 476 (1983); ex 243a (1963)

Technical
- Line length: 21 km (13 mi)
- Number of tracks: 2: Walzwerk–Mathilde; 2: DU-Meiderich Ost–DU-Beeckerwerth; 1: Haus-Knipp bridge (2nd track dismantled); 2: DU-Baerl–Meerbeck
- Track gauge: 1,435 mm (4 ft 8 1/2 in) standard gauge
- Electrification: 15 kV/16.7 Hz AC; Overhead catenary
- Operating speed: 100 km/h (62 mph) (maximum)

The Duisburg-Meiderich Nord–Hohenbudberg railway is a line in the German state of North Rhine-Westphalia that originally ran from Meiderich Nord station to the Hohenbudberg freight yard with a branch to the former Rheinpreußen station on the Lower Rhine Railway and was formerly used primarily for freight.

The operating part of the line now forms the Oberhausen West–Meerbeck railway, which connects the Oberhausen West freight yard and the freight line from Duisburg-Wedau to Bottrop Süd with Meerbeck junction on the Lower Rhine Railway.

== History ==
After the closure of the Ruhrort–Homberg train ferry on 19 May 1907, a simple ferry across the Rhine was maintained for passengers, but another solution had to be found for freight since the Duisburg-Hochfeld Railway Bridge required a long detour.

The Prussian state railways began to construct its new line at Meiderich Nord station from the Duisburg-Ruhrort–Dortmund railway. It ran through the densely populated areas of Ruhrort and Beeck and crossed the Rhine between Beeckerwerth and Baerl on the Haus-Knipp railway bridge.

In Baerl station a branch line forked at a grade-separated junction to run west to Rheinpreußen station on the Lower Rhine Railway, running to the north. The main line again ran through densely populated areas in Homberg and Moers. It met the Lower Rhine line running south in the area of Asberg junction and followed it to Oestrum junction.

After crossing the Duisburg-Ruhrort–Mönchengladbach railway, it continued on to Bergheim station to the east of the Toeppersee (lake) to the Hohenbudberg freight and marshalling yard. In this form, the line was opened for freight traffic on 1 October 1912.

A year later on 1 September 1913, an additional connection was opened from Buschmannshof junction via Duisburg-Meiderich Süd station to Oberhausen West freight yard.

Between 1917 and 1920, Rheinpreußen station was opened on the Lower Rhine Railway north of Moers station, replacing Utfort station, which was a kilometre further north. In 1929, a new curve was built from the end of the branch line to Moers to connect with the Lower Rhine Railway running south at the new Meerbeck junction.

== Passenger services ==
Once a continuous line had been built, as described above, on 29 May 1929 a passenger service was opened from Oberhausen Central Station (Hauptbahnhof) via Duisburg-Meiderich Süd station, on the one hand, and from Oberhausen-Osterfeld Süd station via Meiderich Nord station, on the other hand, to Moers station.

The passenger service through Meiderich Nord station was already closed on 2 October 1932. The service via Meiderich Süd, however, continued, except at the end of the Second World War, when the Haus-Knipp railway bridge had been destroyed.

From the 1960s, passenger services on the line were provided only by DB Class ETA 150 battery electric multiple units until services were abandoned on 23 September 1983.

== Current situation ==
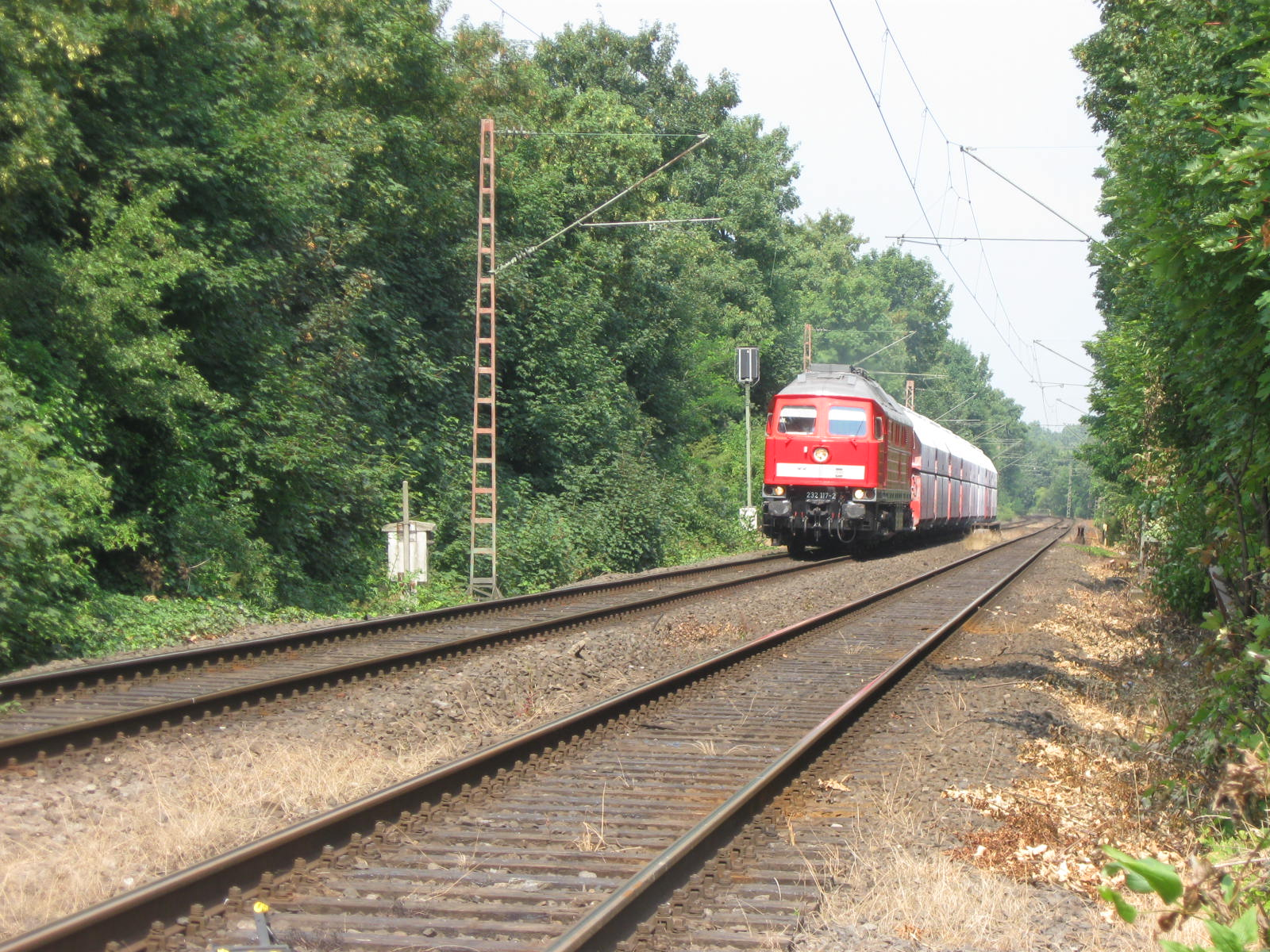
Freight train from Duisburg-Beeck in Duisburg-Meiderich; the line used to cross the railway from Meiderich Nord to Ruhrort here

The section between Baerl and Hohenbudberg was closed on 25 August 1969 and a year later, on 1 October 1970, this was followed by the closure of the section between Meiderich Nord and Buschmannshof junction. All tracks have now been completely dismantled.

The remaining section of the line runs from Oberhausen West freight yard to Meerbeck junction on the Lower Rhine Railway through the Duisburg-Beeck freight yard. This was a planned yard with largely completed earthworks, which was taken into provisional operations with about 15 tracks, but it was not rebuilt after it was destroyed in World War II. Today, a total of four tracks remain, one of which is used as a siding, and the others are closed until further notice. The mechanical signal box is controlled remotely from the Mathilde central interlocking in Oberhausen West.

The line was electrified on 1 December 1970. In 1998, the northern track between the former Duisburg-Beekerwerth station and the Duisburg-Baerl crossover (formerly a station) was closed and partially dismantled. Since May 2012, work has been under way on the Haus-Knipp railway bridge to restore two-track operation.

== Chainage ==
Due to the relocation of lines there is now a change in chainage on the Haus-Knipp railway bridge, where the chainage jumps from 3.800 to 13.070 km.
