= Bottrop-Vonderort station =

Railway station in Bottrop, Germany

Bottrop Vonderort
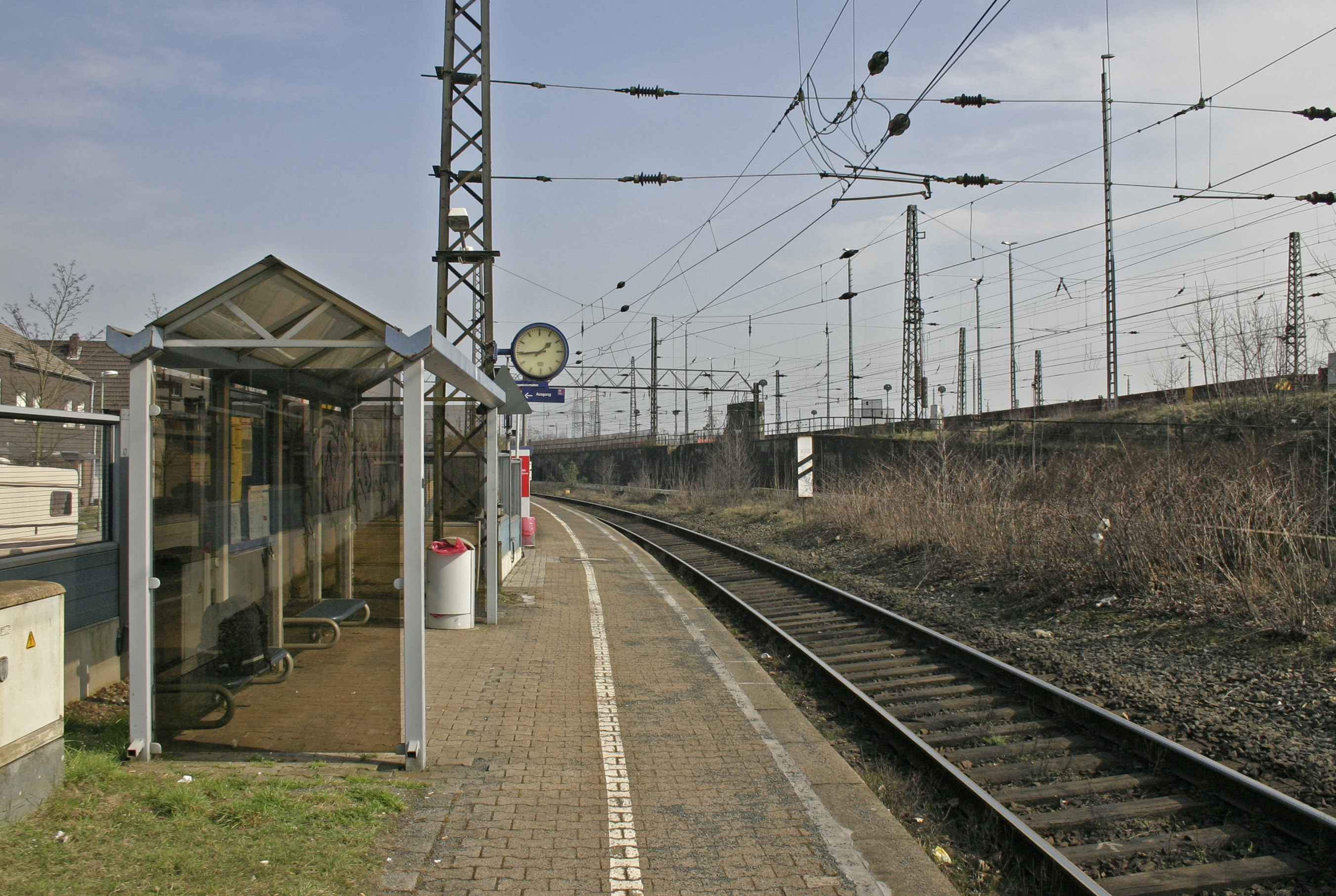
- Platform in 2015

General information
- Location: Bottrop, NRW; Germany
- Coordinates: 51°30′06″N 6°54′44″E
- Owner: Deutsche Bahn
- Operator: DB Netz; DB Station&Service
- Line: Oberhausen-Osterfeld Süd – Hamm railway
- Platforms: 1
- Tracks: 1

Construction
- Accessible: Yes

Other information
- Fare zone: VRR: 250
- Website: www.bahnhof.de

History
- Opened: 1967/68

Services
Preceding station	NordWestBahn	Following station
Oberhausen-Osterfeld Süd towards Moers	RE 44	Bottrop Hbf Terminus
Location

Bottrop-Vonderort is a railway station in Bottrop, North Rhine-Westphalia, Germany.

== The station ==
The station is located on the Oberhausen-Osterfeld Süd – Hamm railway and is served by a regional service operated by NordWestBahn.

== Train services ==
The following services currently call at Bottrop-Vonderort:

Series	Operator	Route	Material	Frequency
RE 44 Fossa-Emscher-Express	NordWestBahn	Moers – Rheinhausen – Duisburg Hbf – Oberhausen Hbf – Oberhausen-Osterfeld Süd – Bottrop-Vonderort – Bottrop Hbf	NWB LINT 41	1x per hour
