= Dortmund-Rahm station =

Railway station in Dortmund, Germany

Dortmund Rahm
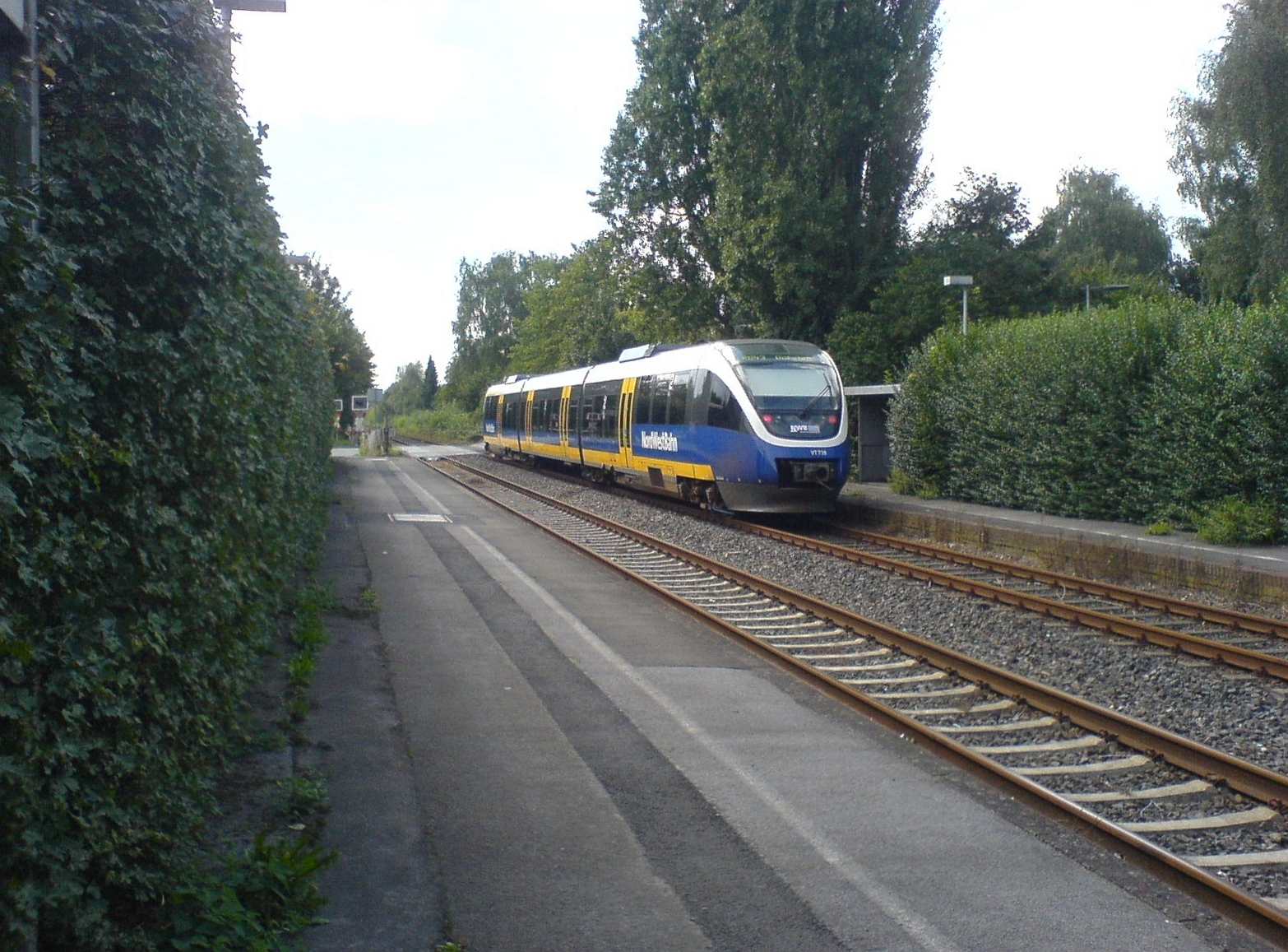

General information
- Location: Rahmer Straße; 44369 Dortmund; NRW, Germany
- Coordinates: 51°31′33″N 7°23′44″E
- Owner: DB Netz
- Operator: DB Station&Service
- Line: Duisburg-Ruhrort–Dortmund railway
- Platforms: 2 side platforms
- Tracks: 2
- Train operators: DB Regio NRW

Construction
- Accessible: Yes

Other information
- Station code: 1323
- DS100 code: EDRA
- IBNR: 8001544
- Category: 6
- Fare zone: VRR: 376
- Website: www.bahnhof.de

Services
Preceding station	DB Regio NRW	Following station
Dortmund-Marten towards Dorsten	RB 43	Dortmund-Huckarde Nord towards Dortmund Hbf
Location
- Location within North Rhine-Westphalia

Dortmund-Rahm station is a railway station in the Rahm district of the town of Dortmund, located in North Rhine-Westphalia, Germany.

== Rail services ==
Line	Name	Route
RB 43	Emschertalbahn	Dorsten – Wanne-Eickel Hauptbahnhof – Herne – Dortmund-Rahm – Dortmund Hauptbahnhof
