= Dortmund–Duisburg railway =

The Dortmund–Duisburg railway can mean various railways, which traverse the Ruhr area in an east–west direction:

- 1845 ~ 1847: The oldest is the Duisburg–Dortmund railway, part of the original route of the former Cologne-Minden Railway Company in the northern Ruhr.
- 1862 ~ 1860: The next was the central Witten/Dortmund–Oberhausen/Duisburg railway opened by the former Bergisch-Märkische Railway Company.
- 1866 ~ 1874: It was followed by the (largely) southern Osterath–Dortmund Süd railway (including a branch line to Duisburg Hbf) of the former Rhenish Railway Company.
- 1866 ~ 1874: At the same time, the Cologne-Minden Railway Company built the Duisburg-Ruhrort–Dortmund railway parallel to its main line; it is also called the "Emscher Valley Railway" (Emschertalbahn) because of its alignment along the Emscher.

In addition, there are two other railway lines running east–west through the Ruhr:

- 1867 ~ 1880: The shortest is the Bochum–Essen/Oberhausen railway of the Bergisch-Märkische Railway Company, which was built through the valley of the Emscher and is also known as the "Emscher Valley Railway".
- 1878 ~ 1880: The youngest is the Welver–Sterkrade railway of the former Royal Westphalian Railway Company, also called the "Emscher Valley Railway", which is why the last three lines are often confused.
