= Bottrop Hauptbahnhof =

Railway station in North Rhine-Westphalia, Germany

Bottrop Hbf
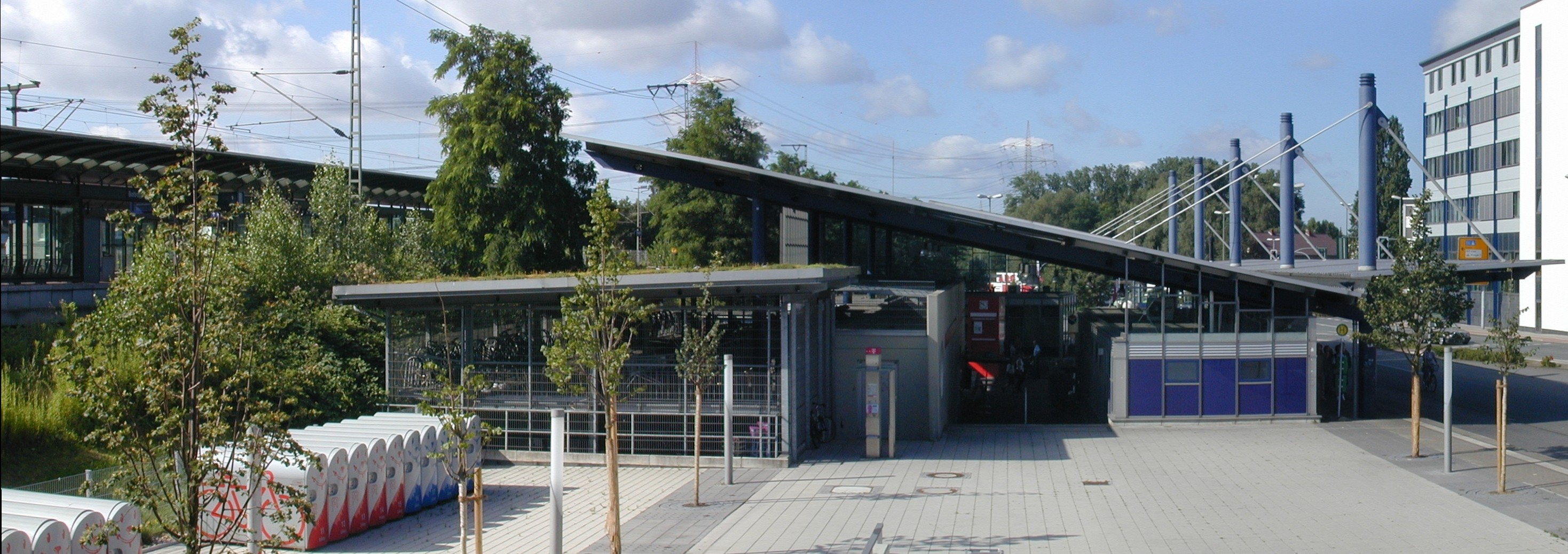
- New station building

General information
- Location: Bottrop, NRW; Germany
- Coordinates: 51°30′35″N 6°56′11″E
- Owner: Deutsche Bahn
- Operator: DB Netz; DB Station&Service
- Lines: Oberhausen-Osterfeld Süd–Haltern; Essen–Bottrop; Welver–Sterkrade; Rhine-Ruhr S-Bahn line S9
- Platforms: 3

Construction
- Accessible: Yes

Other information
- Station code: 804
- DS100 code: EBTH
- IBNR: 8000047
- Category: 4
- Fare zone: VRR: 250
- Website: www.bahnhof.de

History
- Opened: 1905: PSE; 1995: DB

Services
Preceding station	NordWestBahn	Following station
Gladbeck West towards Borken (Westf) or Coesfeld (Westf)	RE 14	Essen-Borbeck towards Essen Hbf
Bottrop-Vonderort towards Moers	RE 44	Terminus
Preceding station	Rhine-Ruhr S-Bahn	Following station
Bottrop-Boy towards Haltern am See or Recklinghausen Hbf	S9	Essen-Dellwig Ost towards Hagen Hbf
Location

Bottrop Hauptbahnof is a railway station in Bottrop, North Rhine-Westphalia, Germany. It is located on the Oberhausen-Osterfeld Süd – Hamm railway and Essen–Bottrop railway and is served by RE and S-Bahn services operated by DB and NordWestBahn.

== History ==
On 12 November 1879, the Royal Westphalian Railway Company opened the Horst–Osterfeld section of its Welver-Sterkrade line, but failed to build a station in Bottrop. Just one year later, the company was nationalised and the line was partly dismantled.

On 1 May 1905 the Prussian state railways opened the Oberhausen-Osterfeld Süd–Hamm railway, which runs parallel to the Westphalian route from Osterfeld Süd to the east for about four kilometres to the current Bottrop Hauptbahnhof and then swings to the north. On this line a station was opened nearly half a kilometre east of the present station then called West Bottrop station. This station was designed with station building on an island between two tracks to the east of Bahnhofsstraße.

At about the same time, the Bottrop CME station of the former Cologne-Minden Railway Company on the Duisburg-Ruhrort–Dortmund railway was renamed Bottrop Süd and the Bottrop RhE station of the former Rhenish Railway Company on the Duisburg–Quakenbrück railway was renamed Bottrop Nord.

The Bottrop West station quickly surpassed the two older stations in importance and it was renamed Bottrop station in 1914. Finally between 1927 and 1936 it was renamed Bottrop Hauptbahnhof, following the opening on 1 July 1922 of a new connecting line to the Mülheim-Heißen–Oberhausen-Osterfeld Nord railway.

After the Second World War, the "Westphalian line" from Bottrop was not restored to operation and was partly dismantled. Bottrop Nord station was closed on 29 May 1960 and Bottrop Süd station followed 14 years later on 26 May 1974.

The old station building was too large for its traffic and poorly located and was demolished in 1995. A new normal through station was built nearly half a kilometre to the west between Bahnhofstrasse and Essener Straße.

== Train services ==
Special 15 min tact RE14 / S9 : Gladbeck West - Bottrop Hbf - Essen-Borbeck - Essen Hbf

The following services currently call at Bottrop Hauptbahnhof:

Line	Operator	Route	Material	Frequency	Notes
RE 14; Emscher-Münsterland-Express	NordWestBahn	Coesfeld (Westf) - Reken - Lembeck - Wulfen / Borken (Westf) - Marbeck-Heiden - Rhade - Deuten - Hervest-Dorsten - Dorsten - Feldhausen - Gladbeck-Zweckel - Gladbeck West - Bottrop Hbf - Essen-Borbeck - Essen Hbf	NWB Talent	2x per hour	
RE 44; Fossa-Emscher-Express	NordWestBahn	Moers – Rheinhausen – Duisburg Hbf – Oberhausen Hbf - Oberhausen-Osterfeld Süd - Bottrop-Vonderort - Bottrop Hbf	NWB LINT 41	1x per hour	
S9	DB Regio	(Hagen Hbf – Gevelsberg – Schwelm –) Wuppertal Hbf - Velbert-Langenberg - Essen Hbf - Bottrop Hbf - Gladbeck West (Herten (Westfalen) –Recklinghausen Hbf) / (- Gelsenkirchen-Buer Nord - Marl Mitte - Haltern am See)	Stadler FLIRT 3XL	2x per hour	
