= Dortmund-Bövinghausen station =

Railway station in Dortmund, Germany

Dortmund Bövinghausen
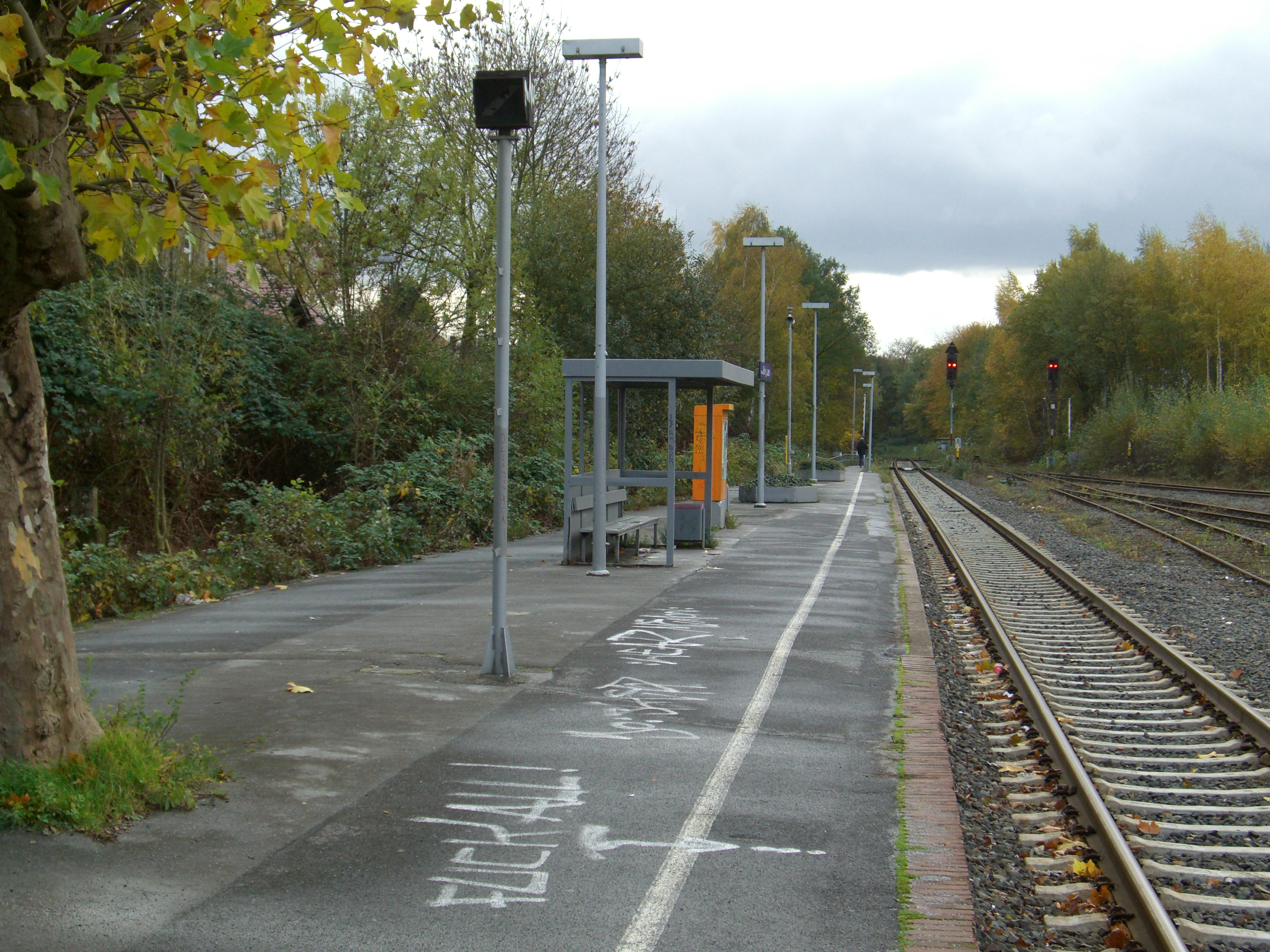

General information
- Location: Merklinder Straße; 44388 Dortmund; NRW, Germany
- Coordinates: 51°31′09″N 7°19′39″E
- Owner: DB Netz
- Operator: DB Station&Service
- Line: Duisburg-Ruhrort–Dortmund railway
- Platforms: 1 side platform
- Tracks: 1
- Train operators: DB Regio NRW

Construction
- Accessible: Yes

Other information
- Station code: 1301
- DS100 code: EDBH
- IBNR: 8001528
- Category: 6
- Fare zone: VRR: 374
- Website: www.bahnhof.de

Services
Preceding station	DB Regio NRW	Following station
Castrop-Rauxel-Merklinde towards Dorsten	RB 43	Dortmund-Lütgendortmund Nord towards Dortmund Hbf
Location
- Location within North Rhine-Westphalia

Dortmund-Bövinghausen station is a railway station in the Bövinghausen district of the town of Dortmund, located in North Rhine-Westphalia, Germany.

== Rail services ==
Line	Name	Route
RB 43	Emschertalbahn	Dorsten – Wanne-Eickel Hauptbahnhof – Herne – Dortmund-Bövinghausen – Dortmund Hauptbahnhof
