= Bottrop-Boy station =

Railway station in Germany

Bottrop Boy
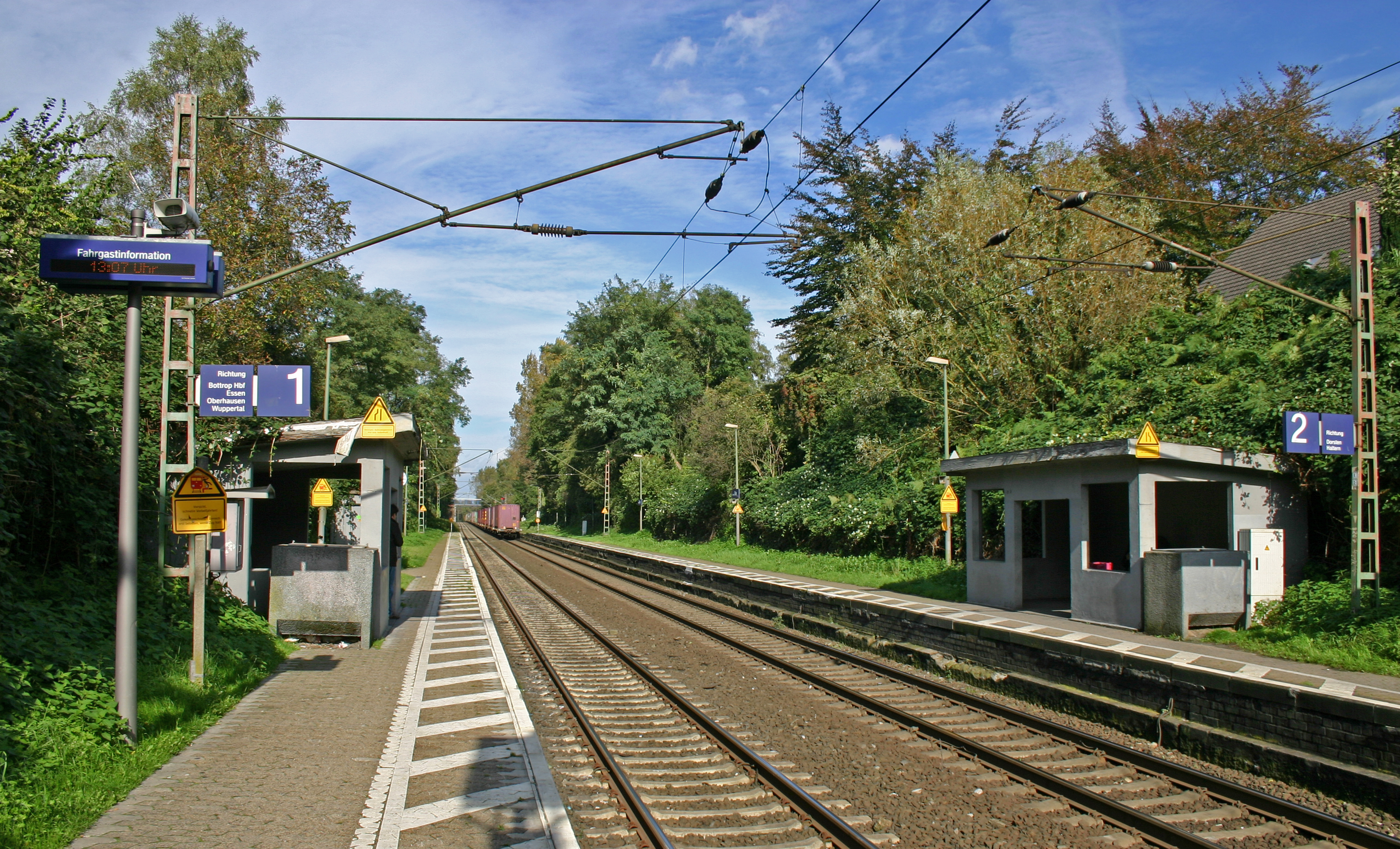

General information
- Location: Horster Str. 378, Bottrop, NRW; Germany
- Coordinates: 51°32′14″N 6°58′04″E
- Lines: Oberhausen-Osterfeld Süd–Hamm (KBS 423)
- Platforms: 2

Construction
- Accessible: No

Other information
- Station code: 805
- DS100 code: EBTB
- Category: 6
- Fare zone: VRR: 250
- Website: www.bahnhof.de

History
- Opened: 1925/27

Services
Preceding station	Rhine-Ruhr S-Bahn	Following station
Gladbeck West towards Haltern am See or Recklinghausen Hbf	S9	Bottrop Hbf towards Hagen Hbf
Location

Bottrop-Boy station is located in the German city of Bottrop in the German state of North Rhine-Westphalia. It is on the Oberhausen-Osterfeld Süd–Hamm line and is classified by Deutsche Bahn as a category 6 station.

The station was opened between 1925 and 1927 by Deutsche Reichsbahn.

It is served by Rhine-Ruhr S-Bahn line S9 (Recklinghausen / Haltern am See and Wuppertal - Hagen), operating every 30 minutes during the day. It is also served by three bus routes: 260 (every 20 minutes), 265 (every 20 minutes) and 266 (every 60 minutes), all operated by Vestische Straßenbahnen.
