= Gladbeck West station =

Railway station in Gladbeck, Germany

Gladbeck West
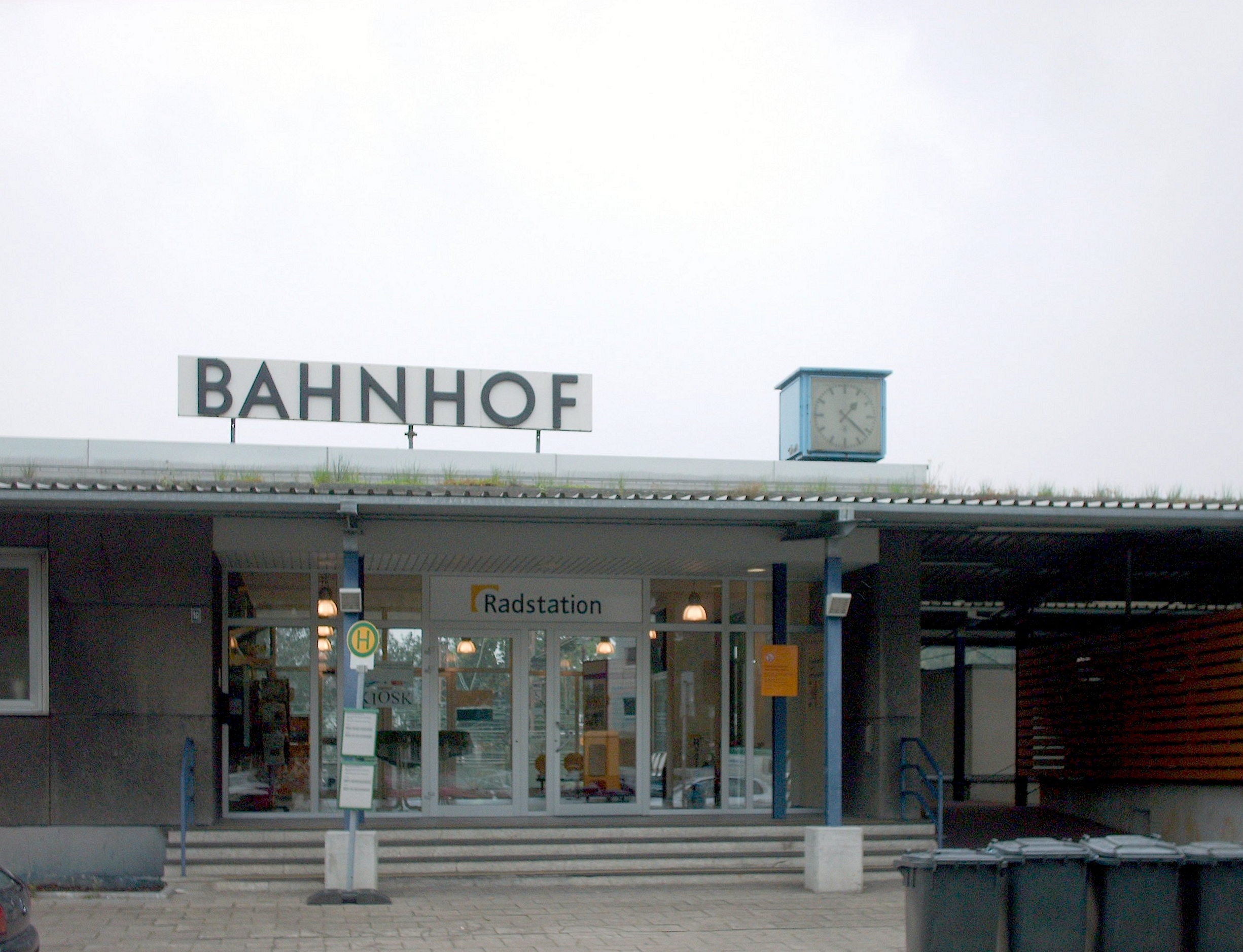

General information
- Location: Hansemannstr. 10, Gladbeck, NRW; Germany
- Coordinates: 51°34′30″N 6°58′35″E
- Lines: OB-Osterfeld Süd–Hamm (KBS 423)
- Platforms: 2

Construction
- Accessible: Yes

Other information
- Station code: 2133
- DS100 code: EGBW
- IBNR: 8000125
- Category: 4
- Fare zone: VRR: 252
- Website: www.bahnhof.de

History
- Opened: 1 May 1905

Services
Preceding station	NordWestBahn	Following station
Gladbeck-Zweckel towards Borken (Westf) or Coesfeld (Westf)	RE 14	Bottrop Hbf towards Essen Hbf
Preceding station	Rhine-Ruhr S-Bahn	Following station
Herten (Westf) towards Recklinghausen Hbf	S9	Bottrop-Boy towards Hagen Hbf
Gelsenkirchen-Buer Nord towards Haltern am See	S9	Bottrop-Boy towards Hagen Hbf
Location

Gladbeck West station is located in the German city of Gladbeck in the German state of North Rhine-Westphalia. It is on the Oberhausen-Osterfeld Süd–Hamm line and is classified by Deutsche Bahn as a category 4 station. The station was opened 1 May 1905 by the Prussian state railways.

It is served by Regional-Express service RE 14: Emscher-Münsterland-Express (Essen–Bottrop-Gladbeck-Dorsten), train part 1 Borken (Westf) / train part 2 Coesfeld (Westf) and Rhine-Ruhr S-Bahn line S9 (Recklinghausen / Haltern–Wuppertal / Hagen).

Special 15 minutes tact RE 14 / S 9 : (Gladbeck-West - Bottrop Hbf, Essen-Borbeck, Essen Hbf).

S 9 separation station Recklinghausen or GE-Buer, Marl, Haltern am See

It is also served by five bus routes: SB36, 253, 254 and 258 (all operated by Vestische Straßenbahnen every 20/30 minutes) and 188 (operated by Busverkehr Rheinland every 60 minutes).
