= Dortmund-Huckarde Nord station =

Railway station in Dortmund, Germany

Dortmund Huckarde Nord
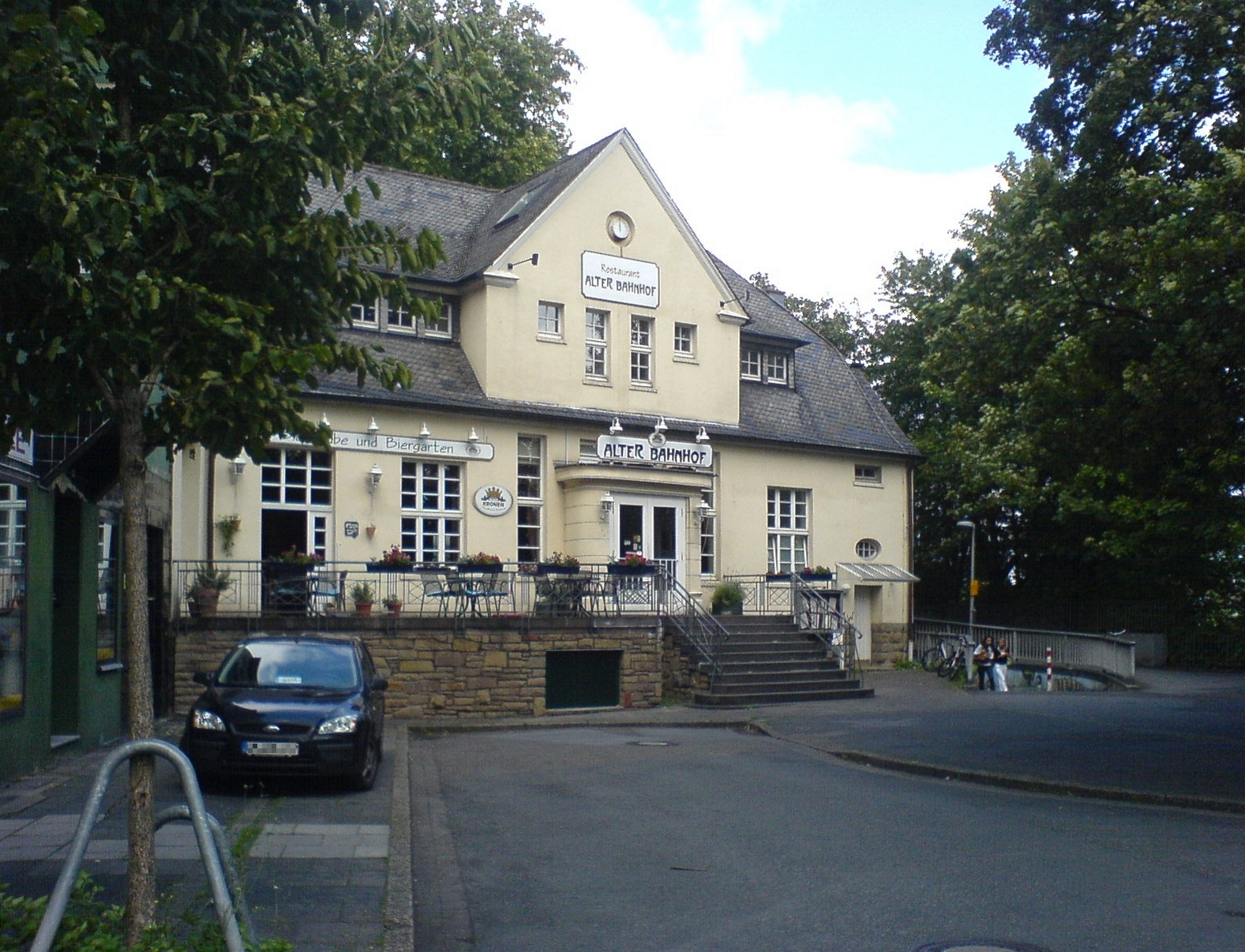

General information
- Location: Altfriedstr., Dortmund, NRW; Germany
- Coordinates: 51°32′1″N 7°24′54″E
- Owner: DB Netz
- Operator: DB Station&Service
- Line: Duisburg-Ruhrort–Dortmund railway
- Platforms: 1 side platform
- Tracks: 1
- Train operators: DB Regio NRW

Construction
- Accessible: Yes, but very low platform

Other information
- Station code: 1308
- DS100 code: EDHU
- Category: 7
- Fare zone: VRR: 376
- Website: www.bahnhof.de

History
- Opened: 1879 or 1892

Services
Preceding station	DB Regio NRW	Following station
Dortmund-Marten towards Dorsten	RB 43	Dortmund Hbf Terminus
Location
- Location within North Rhine-Westphalia

Dortmund-Huckarde Nord (north) station is a passenger station in the Dortmund district of Huckarde in the German state of North Rhine-Westphalia. It is classified by Deutsche Bahn as a category 7 station.

The station is located on the Duisburg-Ruhrort–Dortmund railway (Cologne-Minden Emscher Valley Railway) and has one platform. The Emscher Valley Railway through the station was initially opened mainly for the transport of coal to the Port of Duisburg at the beginning of 1878. Passenger trains first stopped at Dortmund-Huckarde Nord (originally called Huckarde) in 1879 or 1892. In 1908, the station was equipped with an impressive building. The building was, with Dortmund-Kurl station, one of the last two station buildings built in Dortmund immediately before the First World War.

Dortmund-Huckarde Nord station is still a stop on the RB 43 Regionalbahn services (Emschertalbahn). There is a restaurant in the station building.

The train station is a registered monument on the list of monuments of Dortmund and part of the Industrial Heritage Trail.

== Rail services ==
Line	Name	Route
RB 43	Emschertalbahn	Dorsten – Wanne-Eickel Hauptbahnhof – Herne – Dortmund-Huckarde Nord – Dortmund Hauptbahnhof
