= Oberhausen-Osterfeld Süd station =

Railway station in Oberhausen, Germany

Oberhausen Osterfeld Süd
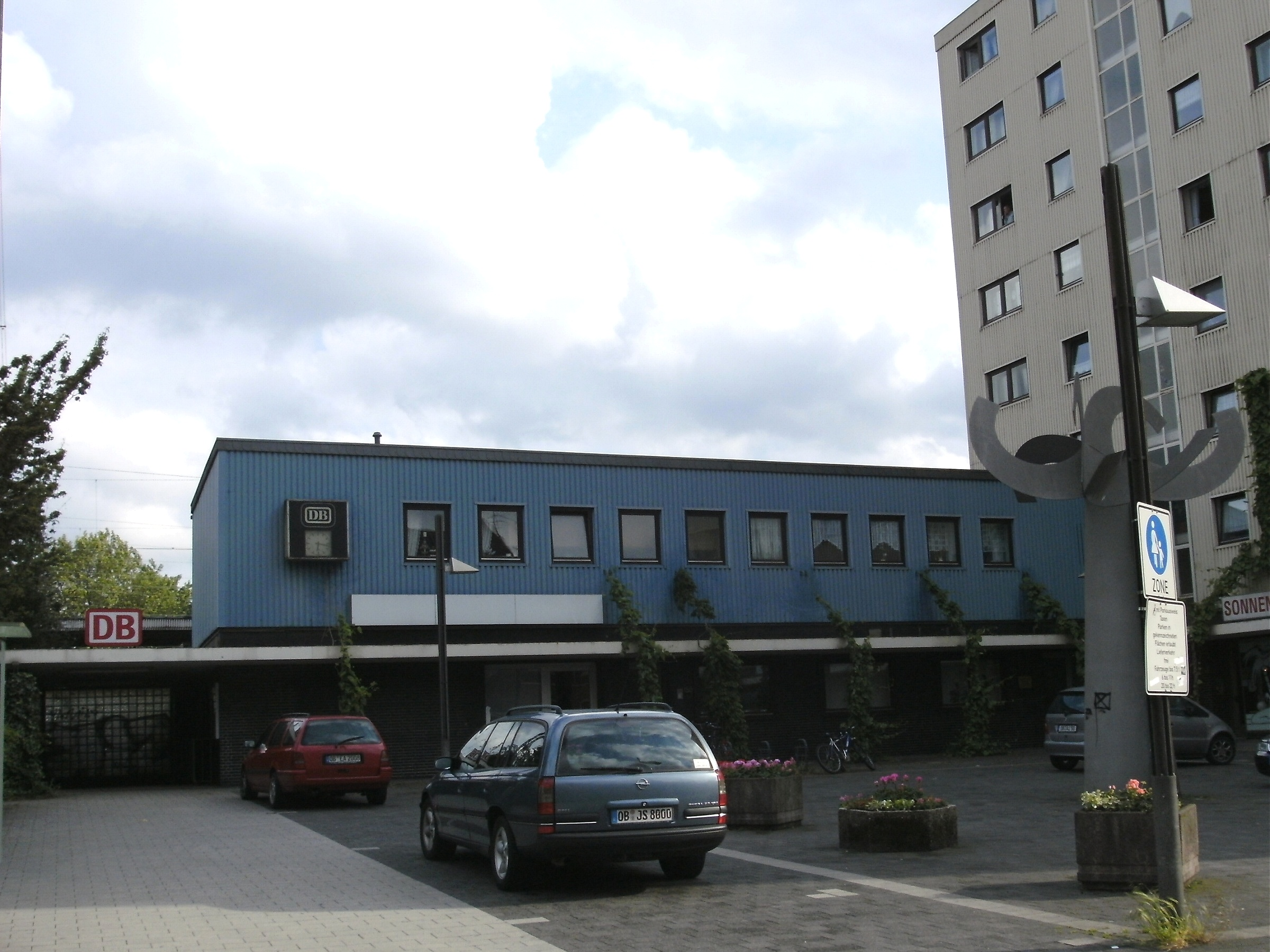
- Oberhausen-Osterfeld Süd railway station

General information
- Location: Bottroper Str. 150, Oberhausen, NRW; Germany
- Coordinates: 51°29′59″N 6°53′04″E
- Owner: Deutsche Bahn
- Operator: DB Netz; DB Station&Service
- Lines: Duisburg-Ruhrort–Dortmund; Bochum–Oberhausen (KBS 424); OB-Osterfeld Süd–Hamm (KBS 423, 424); former Bahnstrecke Welver–Sterkrade
- Platforms: Island platform
- Tracks: 2

Construction
- Accessible: No

Other information
- Station code: 4650
- DS100 code: EOS
- IBNR: 8004541
- Category: 6
- Fare zone: VRR: 240, 242, and 250
- Website: www.bahnhof.de

History
- Opened: 1873: station of the CME; 1879: station of the KWE; 1880: station of the BME; 1891 marshalling yard of the PSE

Services
Preceding station	NordWestBahn	Following station
Oberhausen Hbf towards Moers	RE 44	Bottrop-Vonderort towards Bottrop Hbf
Location

Oberhausen-Osterfeld Süd station is a railway station in Oberhausen, North Rhine-Westphalia, Germany. It is part of the Oberhausen-Osterfeld complex which includes a large marshalling yard.

== The station ==
The station opened in 1873 and is located on the Oberhausen-Osterfeld Süd – Hamm railway and is served by RB services operated by NordWestBahn.

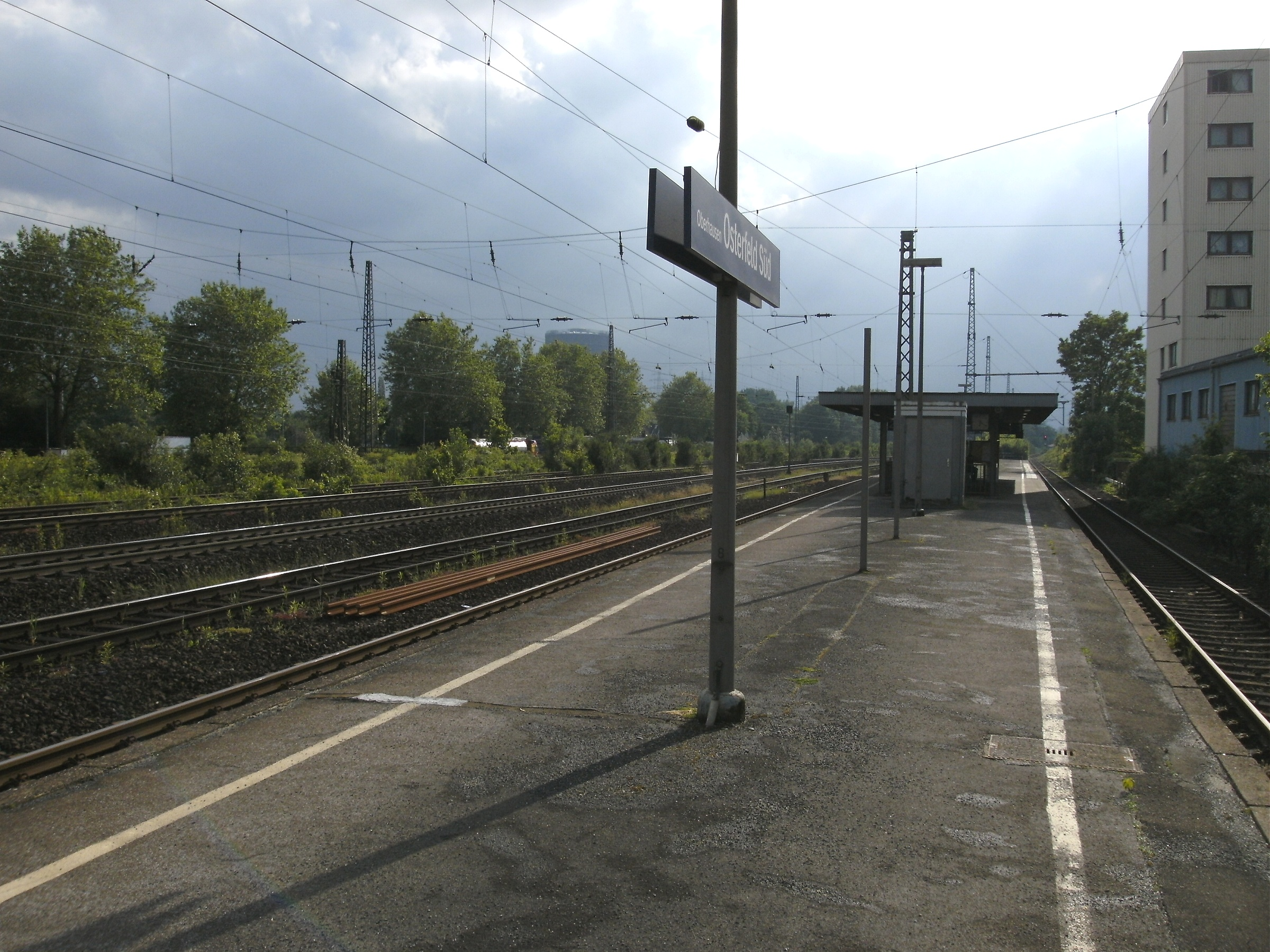
The island platform

== Train services ==
The following service currently call at Oberhausen-Osterfeld Süd:

Series	Operator	Route	Material	Frequency
RE 44 Fossa-Emscher-Express	NordWestBahn	Moers – Rheinhausen – Duisburg Hbf – Oberhausen Hbf – Oberhausen-Osterfeld Süd – Bottrop-Vonderort – Bottrop Hbf	NWB LINT 41	1x per hour

== Bus services ==
- 958

== Rail depot ==
The stations lies close to Oberhausen-Osterfeld rail depot and freight yard.

== See also ==
- List of railway stations in North Rhine-Westphalia
