= Dortmund-Marten station =

Railway station in Germany

Dortmund Marten
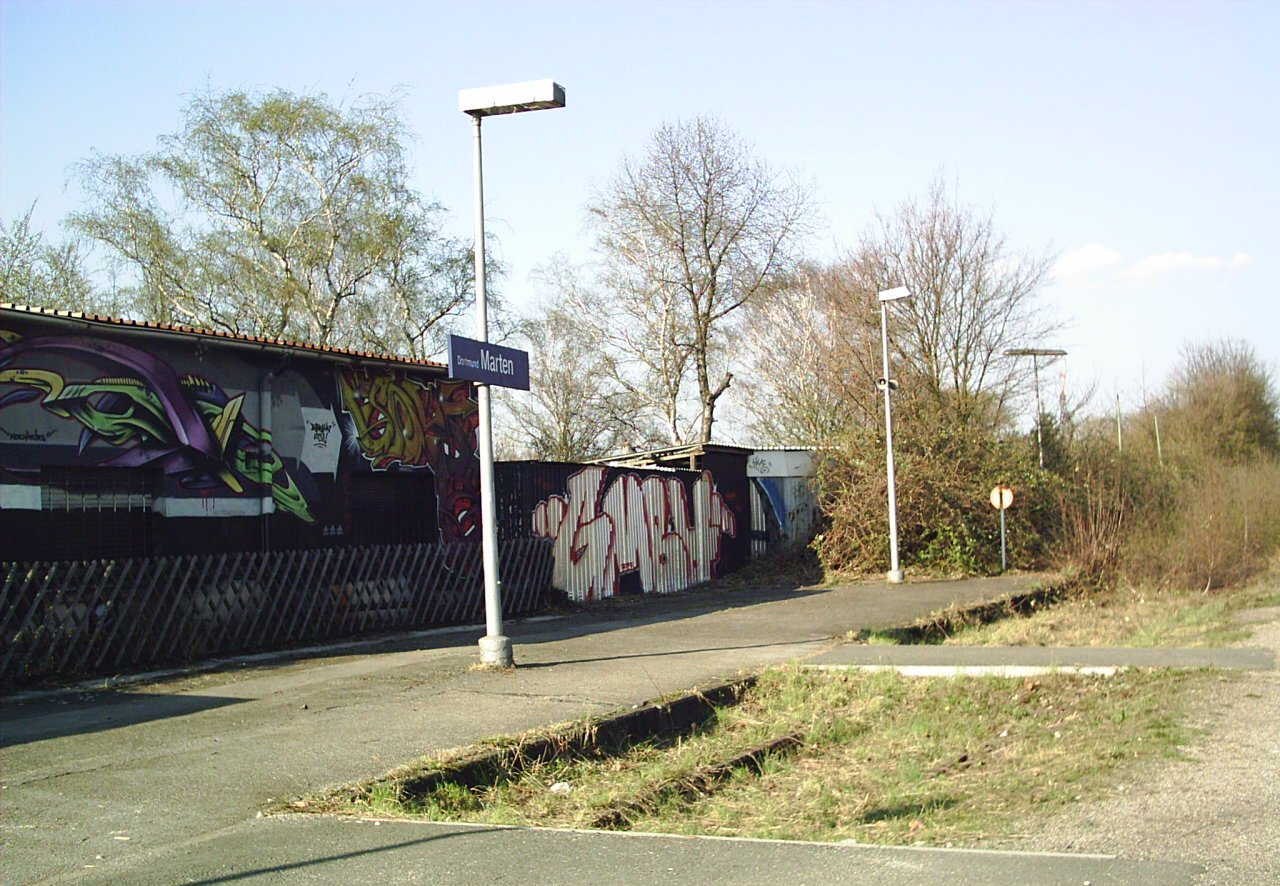

General information
- Location: Hangeneystraße; 44379 Dortmund; NRW, Germany
- Coordinates: 51°30′52″N 7°22′28″E
- Owner: DB Netz
- Operator: DB Station&Service
- Line: Duisburg-Ruhrort–Dortmund railway
- Platforms: 1 side platform
- Tracks: 1
- Train operators: DB Regio NRW

Construction
- Accessible: Yes

Other information
- Station code: 1318
- DS100 code: EDMR
- IBNR: 8001541
- Category: 6
- Fare zone: VRR: 374
- Website: www.bahnhof.de

Services
Preceding station	DB Regio NRW	Following station
Dortmund-Lütgendortmund Nord towards Dorsten	RB 43	Dortmund-Rahm towards Dortmund Hbf
Location
- Location within North Rhine-Westphalia

Dortmund-Marten station is a railway station in the Marten district of the town of Dortmund, located in North Rhine-Westphalia, Germany.

It is classified by Deutsche Bahn as a category 6 station and was opened on 30 May 1964.

== Rail services ==
Line	Name	Route
RB 43	Emschertalbahn	Dorsten – Wanne-Eickel Hauptbahnhof – Herne – Dortmund-Marten – Dortmund Hauptbahnhof
