= Herten (Westf) station =

Railway station in Germany

Herten (Westf)
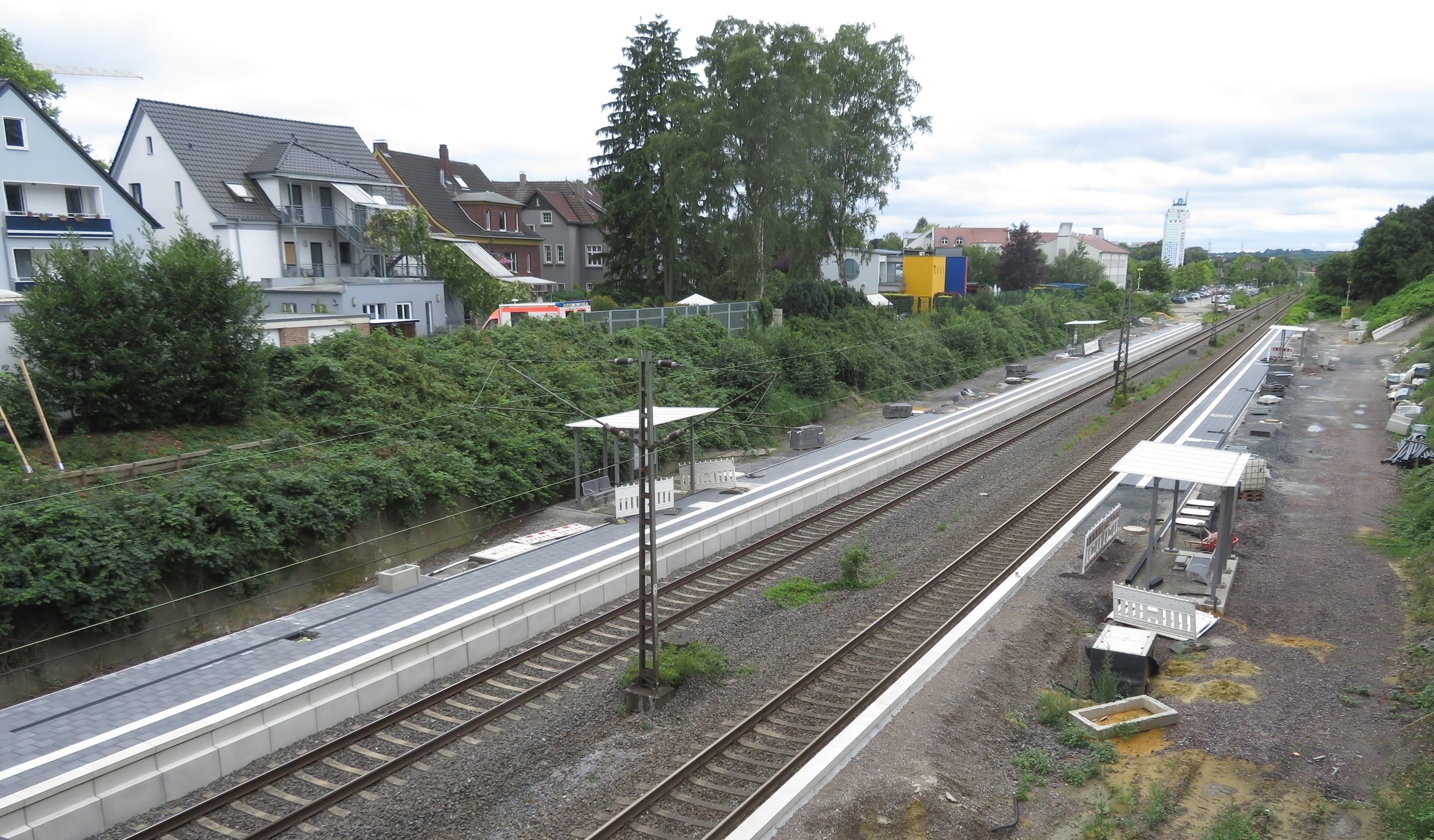
- Herten (Westf) Station in July 2022

General information
- Location: Gartenstr. 35, Herten, NRW; Germany
- Coordinates: 51°35′51″N 7°08′21″E
- System: S-Bahn Rhein-Ruhr
- Owner: DB Netz
- Operator: DB Station&Service
- Platforms: 2

Construction
- Accessible: Yes

Other information
- Fare zone: VRR
- Website: https://www.bahnhof.de/herten-westf

History
- Opened: 11 December 2022

Services
Preceding station	Rhine-Ruhr S-Bahn	Following station
Recklinghausen Hbf towards Haltern am See or Recklinghausen Hbf	S9	Herten-Westerholt towards Hagen Hbf
Location

Herten (Westf) is a Deutsche Bahn category 5 railway station in Herten, Germany. It lies on the Oberhausen-Osterfeld Süd–Hamm railway and serves as Herten's main railway station.

== History ==
=== Former railway station ===
The former Herne Railway station was first opened in 1905 and served the town until passenger services were discontinued in 1983. In 1993 the site was turned into a Passing loop.

=== New railway station ===
In 2020 the S-Bahn Line S9 started operating passenger services on the line towards Recklinghausen Hbf and passed Herten without stopping. Construction of the new railway station began in 2021 and the station opened in December 2022. Until the opening Herten was the biggest town in Germany without a railway station.
