= Haus-Knipp railway bridge =

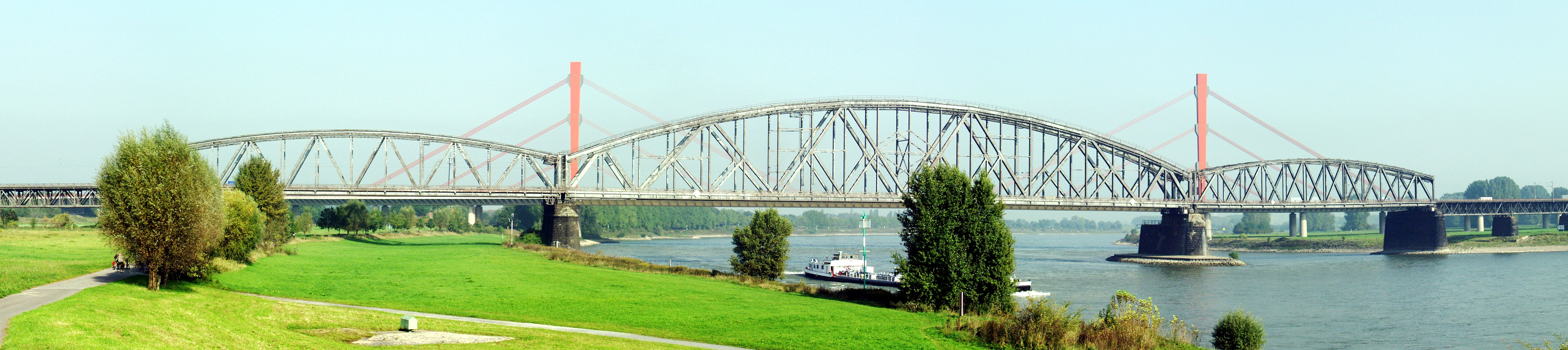
- Haus-Knipp bridge with the red pillars of the highway bridge behind
- Coordinates: 51°28′43″N 6°40′50″E
- Carries: Trains
- Crosses: Rhine
- Locale: Duisburg, North Rhine-Westphalia, Germany
- Official name: Haus-Knipp-Eisenbahnbrücke

Characteristics
- Design: Truss bridge
- Total length: 767 m (2,516 ft)
- Longest span: 186 m (610 ft)

History
- Opened: 1 October 1912

Location
- Interactive map of Haus-Knipp railway bridge

The Haus-Knipp railway bridge (German: Haus-Knipp-Eisenbahnbrücke) is a railway bridge over the Rhine north of the port of Duisburg-Ruhrort between Duisburg-Beeckerwerth and Duisburg-Baerl on the route of the Oberhausen–Moers railway in the German state of North Rhine-Westphalia.

== History ==
Construction of the bridge began in March 1910. It was opened for freight traffic on 1 October 1912. Passenger services over the bridge started in 1929. At the end of the Second World War, the bridge was blown up by retreating German troops. It was rebuilt with the help of British pioneers as early as 1945 in its old form with its characteristic truss construction and opened to traffic on 26 February 1946. Since 1998, only a single track of the two tracks on the bridge has been used, the other track has been closed between Baerl and Beeckerwerth and is partially dismantled. Intensive building work began in May 2012 on the bridge to restore two-track operation on the bridge, which was completed in early 2013.

The main span has a width of 186 metres, making it the longest truss bridge span in Europe at the time. To the east and west there are two slightly smaller, 106 metre-long truss bridges. The trestle-structure on the flood plain on the west of the Rhine bridges has three spans and on the east bank there are nine spans. Since both tracks were built as independent bridge girders, there are a total of 24 bridge trusses that are each 41 metres long with a design weight of 2,600 tons, which were built at the former Friedrich-Alfred steel works in Duisburg-Rheinhausen. The cost of construction was about 8.5 million gold mark (equivalent to about €44,395,881 in current values). In 1912, the Haus-Knipp bridge was the first bridge in the area of modern Duisburg not to have bridge pylons.

== Name ==
The bridge is an old landmark for the navigation of the Rhine. It is named after the manor of Haus Knipp, which was located near the bridge and was demolished in 1939 so that the levy next to the Rhine could be raised.

== See also ==
- List of bridges over the Rhine
