= Bochum–Essen/Oberhausen railway =

Railway line in Germany

Overview
- Other name: Bergisch-Märkische Emscher Valley Railway
- Native name: Märkische Emschertalbahn
- Line number: 2153 (Bochum–Nordstern); 2172 (Gelsenkirchen-Bismarck–Essen); 2253 (Essen-Katernberg–Oberhausen)
- Locale: North Rhine-Westphalia, Germany

Service
- Route number: 428 (Bochum–Herne-Rottbruch); 426 (Wanne Unser Fritz–Gelsenkirchen Zoo); 423 (Oberhausen-Osterfeld Süd–Oberhausen)

Technical
- Line length: 29 kilometres (18 mi) + 16 kilometres (9.9 mi)
- Track gauge: 1,435 mm (4 ft 8 1/2 in) standard gauge
- Electrification: 15 kV/16.7 Hz AC overhead catenary
- Operating speed: 65 km/h (40 mph)

The Bochum–Essen/Oberhausen railway was built by the Bergisch-Märkische Railway Company (Bergisch-Märkische Eisenbahn-Gesellschaft, BME) to the north of its main line through the central Ruhr to tap traffic from mines and factories in the northern Ruhr region, which is now in the German state of North Rhine-Westphalia.

== History ==
For a long time, the main focus of the BME was on its lines through the Bergisches Land (the Witten/Dortmund–Oberhausen/Duisburg railway) and along the Ruhr (the Ruhr Valley Railway), which connected to local factories and coal mines.

With the migration of the coal mining industry north from the vicinity of the Ruhr to the Emscher, the area between the two rivers became more of interest to the BME. This area had previously only been served by the Rhenish Railway Company (RhE) and the Cologne-Minden Railway Company (CME) with its more northerly Ruhr lines.

Already in 1847, the CME had built its main line between Duisburg and Dortmund, which roughly followed the course of the Emscher. Some twenty years later, it built its Emscher Valley Railway parallel to its main line and generally close to the Emscher. Thus, the CME had a virtual monopoly in this area.

Around the same time in the early 1870s, the RhE established the Rhenish Ruhr line, between Mülheim and Langendreer, also north of the BME's Ruhr line. In the late 1870s, another company, the Royal Westphalian Railway Company (KWE), built its own Emscher Valley Railway.

In order not to leave the lucrative area on both sides of the Emscher completely to its three competitors, the BME then began the construction of three sections of line, starting from the stations in Bochum, Essen and Oberhausen on its Ruhr line, that ultimately formed a continuous connection from Herne-Rottbruch to Oberhausen-Osterfeld Süd along the Emscher (hence it was also called the "Märkische Emscher Valley Railway").

=== Essen–Bochum–Herne ===
In 1867, the BME began building a siding from Bochum BME station to the north, mostly to connect to mines. It reached Gußstahlwerk (literally “cast steel works”, now Bochum West) on 16 November 1867, Riemke (now Bochum-Riemke) on 1 March 1869 and Herne on 28 May 1870. At the time this was the northernmost line of the BME.

On 1 November 1874, it officially opened a section that initially ran parallel with the Witten/Dortmund–Oberhausen/Duisburg railway from Essen BME via Wattenscheid BME and Bochum BME to Herne BME for freight, exactly two months later passenger services started.

=== Essen–Schalke ===
Starting from Essen BME station (now Essen Hbf) a siding ran in a wide arc north to the Königin Elisabeth colliery in what is now Essen-Frillendorf. A triangle of lines formed by this line, the Essen RhE–Kray RhE line built in 1868 (now the Essen Nord–Essen-Kray Nord line) and the Essen BME–Kray RhE line built in 1905 (now the Essen Hbf–Essen-Kray Nord line); a nearby street in Frillendorf is still called Gleisdreieck (“rail track triangle”).

The siding was extended as a line via Caternberg BME (now Essen-Katernberg Nord) to Schalke BME (now Gelsenkirchen-Schalke Nord), including a branch line from Helene junction to Essen CME (now Essen-Altenessen); both lines were opened for freight traffic on 27 April 1874.

As well as the section between Essen and Herne opened on 1 January 1875, passenger traffic ran regularly from Essen BME to Schalke BME and Essen CME, but at first non-stop. In 1880 passenger trains stopped for the first time at Caternberg BME and in 1889 this was followed by a passenger stop at Hessler (which was previously only a junction).

Finally Stoppenberg station was inaugurated by the mayor of Stoppenberg, Carl Meyer on 8 August 1901. During the French occupation of the Ruhr in 1923, this station was the only free station in all of Essen. The station building was demolished in 1984 after the entire section was closed for passenger operations in 1969.

The line was mostly closed in 1970, only the section between Essen-Stoppenberg and Essen-Altenessen remained opened as a station track to a mining-test facility until 1978.

=== Schalke–Herne-Rottbruch ===
Just over a year later, the opening of the section from Schalke BME via Bismarck (now Gelsenkirchen-Bismarck) station to Herne crossing station (Kreuzungsstation Herne, now Herne-Rottbruch) closed the gap between the two branches and the first freight trains ran over the entire line on 10 January 1876.

There were no continuous passenger services, however, as only the western section between Schalke and Bismarck was used by passenger trains, starting on 21 June 1880. After the Winterswijk–Gelsenkirchen-Bismarck railway, built by the Dutch Westphalian Railway Company (Niederländisch-Westfälische Eisenbahn-Gesellschaft) was opened for passenger traffic one week earlier, the BME took over its operations and ran its trains through to Essen, which meant that these trains had to reverse in Bismarck.

=== Caternberg–Oberhausen ===
This section also emerged from a coal mine siding, connecting the Carl colliery in Essen-Altenessen with Caternberg BME station. The line from there to Oberhausen BME station (now Oberhausen Central Station, then still the terminus of its Witten/Dortmund–Oberhausen/Duisburg line) was dismantled by the BME on 23 May 1879. It started at the location of platform tracks 1–3, which no longer exist, and went along the route now used by the Oberhausen combined tram/bus line, running to the north of the Emscher. Here the line turned in a tight curve to the east towards Osterfeld BME station, which was located in the area of the modern Märkischen Straße.

On 29 September 1879, the first short section from Caternberg BME to Vogelheim was inaugurated. This was followed on 1 June 1880 by the remaining section via Essen-Horl (formerly a freight yard, later a junction, now disused) and Osterfeld BME (now fully incorporated into the Oberhausen-Osterfeld Süd marshalling yard and located in the Märkischen Straße area).

== Current situation ==
Since the line, apart from the sections mentioned above, never had great significance for passenger traffic, it was connected with the other lines in the region and optimised for the transport of freight after the BME's nationalisation and integration into the Prussian state railways.

The Osterath–Dortmund Süd railway of the RhE was closed to the west of Bochum Präsident and instead traffic ran via route 2152 through Bochum-Riemke station connecting to the Bochum–Herne line.

Freight traffic follows the historic route to Gelsenkirchen-Schalke nord and then runs over a curve to Nordstern junction to connect with the CME Emscher Valley Railway, which it then follows to Oberhausen-Osterfeld Süd. The BME route to Oberhausen-Osterfeld Süd Swo signal box is largely closed, except for two sections that serve only as sidings.

The street of Helenendamm was built in 1969/70 on a section of the disused line between Burggrafenstraße junction and the former Essen-Katernberg Nord station in Essen-Altenessen. The entire route of the abandoned section of line would be used for an expressway under plans for the closure of a gap of autobahn 52.

== Services ==
The following sections are now served by passenger services:

Bochum Hbf–Herne Rottbruch

This section is served by the Glückauf-Bahn ("Good Luck Railway") Regionalbahn service (RB 46) operated by Abellio Rail NRW. From Herne-Rottbruch the line runs over a link (VzG number 2202) to the Cologne-Minden Emscher Valley Railway to Wanne-Eickel Central Station. The former Herne-Rottbruch halt is not served.

Wanne Unser Fritz–Gelsenkirchen Zoo

This two-kilometre section is served by Regionalbahn service RB 43 (Emschertal-Bahn) currently operated by NordWestBahn to the Cologne-Minden Emscher Valley Railway and from Wanne-Eickel over the link (VzG number 2204) to Gelsenkirchen-Bismarck on the line to Dorsten.

Oberhausen-Osterfeld Süd–Oberhausen Hbf

The last part of the line is now intensively used as a public transport route as a combined tram/bus line. The parallel line from Osterfeld to Oberhausen station, built by the Prussian state railways, is used by Regionalbahn service RB 44 (Der Dorstener), also operated by NordWestBahn, from Oberhausen to near Oberhausen-Osterfeld Süd station, where it connects with the Oberhausen-Osterfeld Süd–Hamm railway.
