= Rheinhausen–Kleve railway =

Railway line in North Rhine-Westphalia, Germany

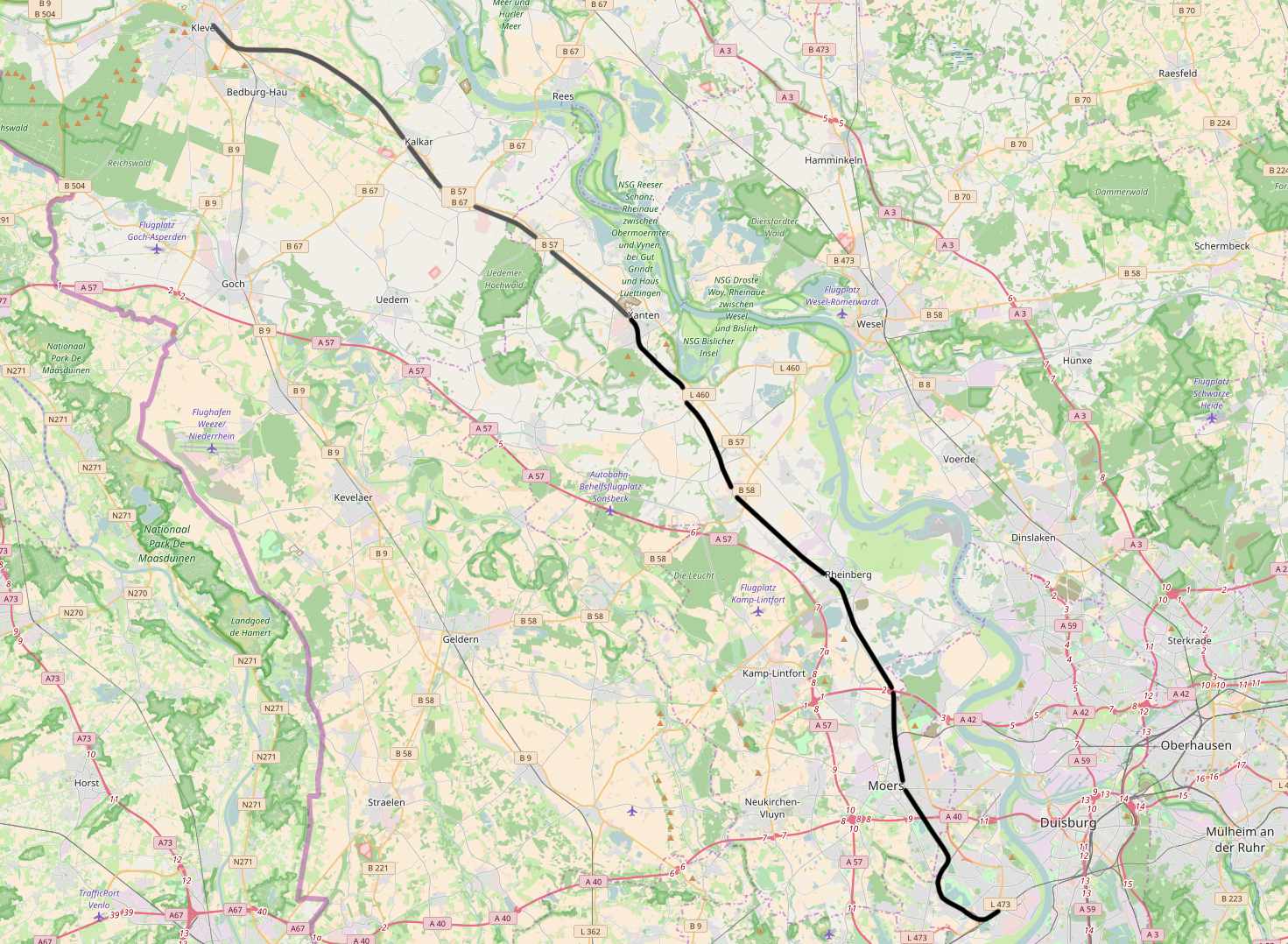

Overview
- Native name: Niederrheinstrecke
- Line number: 2330 Rheinhausen–Kleve; 505 Hochfeld–Rheinhausen; 2312 DU Hbf–Hochfeld
- Locale: North Rhine-Westphalia, Germany
- Termini: Kleve; Duisburg Hbf

Service
- Route number: 498

Technical
- Line length: 63.2 km (39.3 mi)
- Number of tracks: 2: Rheinhausen–Rheinkamp
- Track gauge: 1,435 mm (4 ft 8 1/2 in) standard gauge
- Electrification: 15 kV/16.7 Hz AC catenary
- Operating speed: 90 km/h (56 mph) (normal); 120 km/h (75 mph) (maximum)

The Rheinhausen–Kleve railway, also known in German as the Niederrheinstrecke (Lower Rhine Railway), is a formerly continuous railway on the Lower Rhine in the German state of North Rhine-Westphalia.

The line between Rheinhausen and Rheinkamp is duplicated and classified as a mainline railway and then continues to Xanten as a single-track branch line. The final section to Kleve has been out of use since 1990. The line to Millingen has overhead electrification.

== Name ==
The Lower Rhine line was built in 1903/04 under the name of the Hippeland-Express by the Prussian state railways. "Hippe" means goat in the Lower Rhine dialect, a typical domestic animal in the Lower Rhine. The name of the line reflected the rustic nature of the area at the end of the line.

== Route ==
The line, which was officially opened in 1904, starts at Rheinhausen station, where it separated at an at-grade junction from the Osterath–Dortmund Süd railway, which was built by the former Rhenish Railway Company (Rheinische Eisenbahn-Gesellschaft, RhE). This line connects with Duisburg Central Station.

Within the current city limits of Duisburg, it crossed in Trompet station at grade the former route of the Duisburg-Ruhrort–Mönchengladbach railway, which was built by the Aachen-Düsseldorf-Ruhrort Railway, which was taken over by the Bergisch-Märkische Railway Company (Bergisch-Märkische Eisenbahn-Gesellschaft, BME) in 1866.

North of Alpen it had a grade-separated crossing over the former Haltern–Venlo railway, a section of the "Paris–Hamburg railway" of the former Cologne-Minden Railway Company (Cöln-Mindener Eisenbahn-Gesellschaft, CME). Shortly afterwards it crossed over the former Boxtel-Büderich railway of the former Noord-Brabantsch-Duitsche Spoorweg-Maatschappij (Dutch: North Brabant-German Railway Company). The line ended at Kleve station on the Lower Left Rhine Railway (built by the RhE).

== Partial closure ==
In the 1980s, many industrial enterprises and mines in Duisburg and the other cities of the Ruhr were shut down, so that fewer commuters used the line and it became less profitable over time.

Ridership declined so far that Deutsche Bundesbahn decided to abandon the section of the line between Kleve and Xanten. Urgent maintenance on the northern section was therefore postponed and eventually no longer performed. Passenger traffic on this section was abandoned on 29 December 1989 and freight traffic ended on 28 February 1990. The track was dismantled in 2003.

Since 2010, a cycle path has been under construction on the route. This has been completed between Xanten and Marienbaum.

== Operations ==
The Lower Rhine line is served by Regionalbahn passenger service RB 31 (Der Niederrheiner) between Duisburg and Xanten, running daily at hourly intervals. A service every 30 minutes is provided in the peak hour with two additional pairs of trains from or to Xanten. An additional service, the RE 44 (Fossa-Emscher-Express) runs hourly between Duisburg and Moers, producing a service ever 30 minutes on this section. The service was operated until December 2009 by DB Regio NRW, using Bombardier Talent (class 643) diesel multiple units in single or double sets. Since December 2009, NordWestBahn has operated the services on the line, as they won the tender for the operation of the Nier-Rhein-Emscher network. It uses Alstom Coradia LINT 41 diesel railcars in single or double sets.

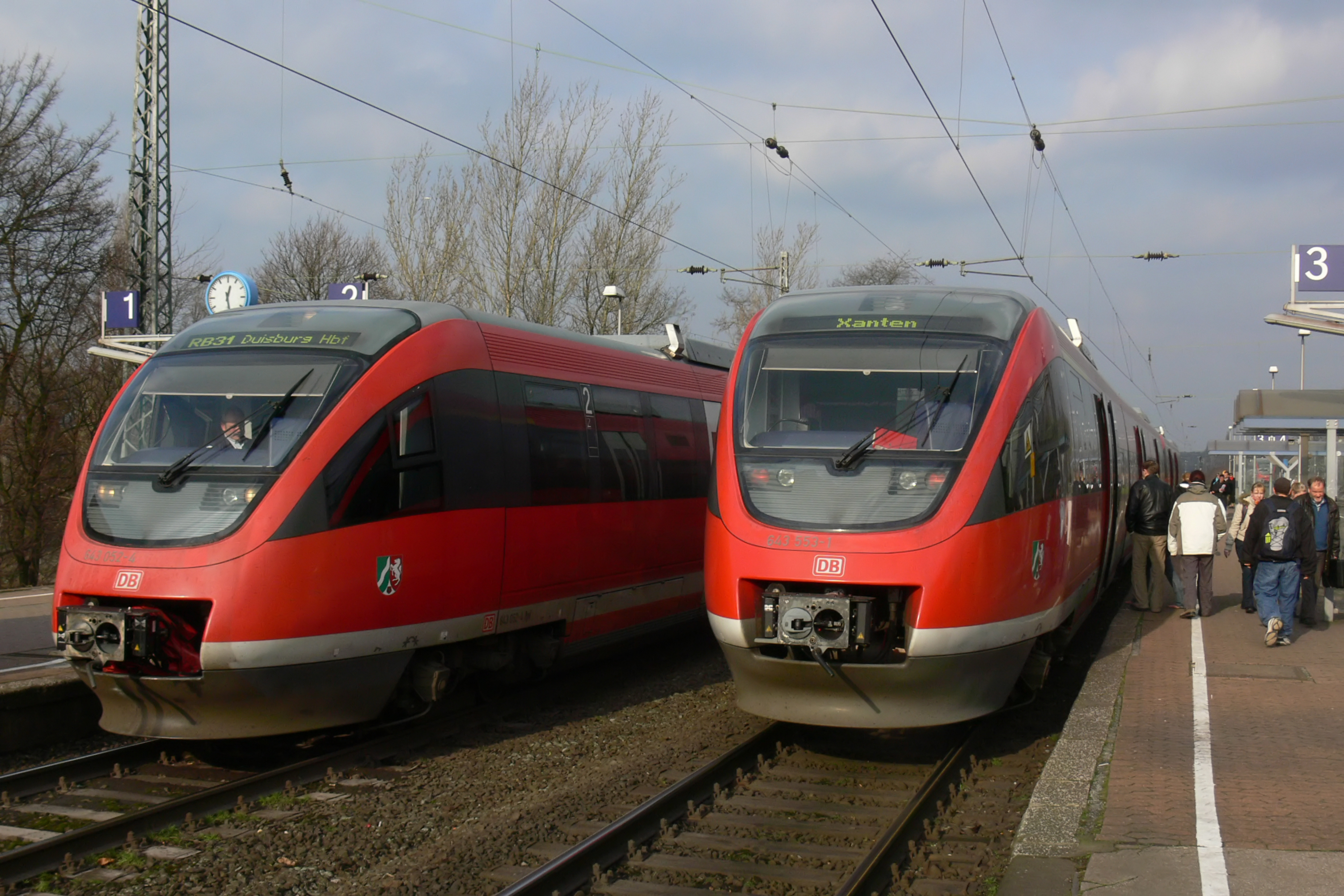
DB Class 643 in Moers station

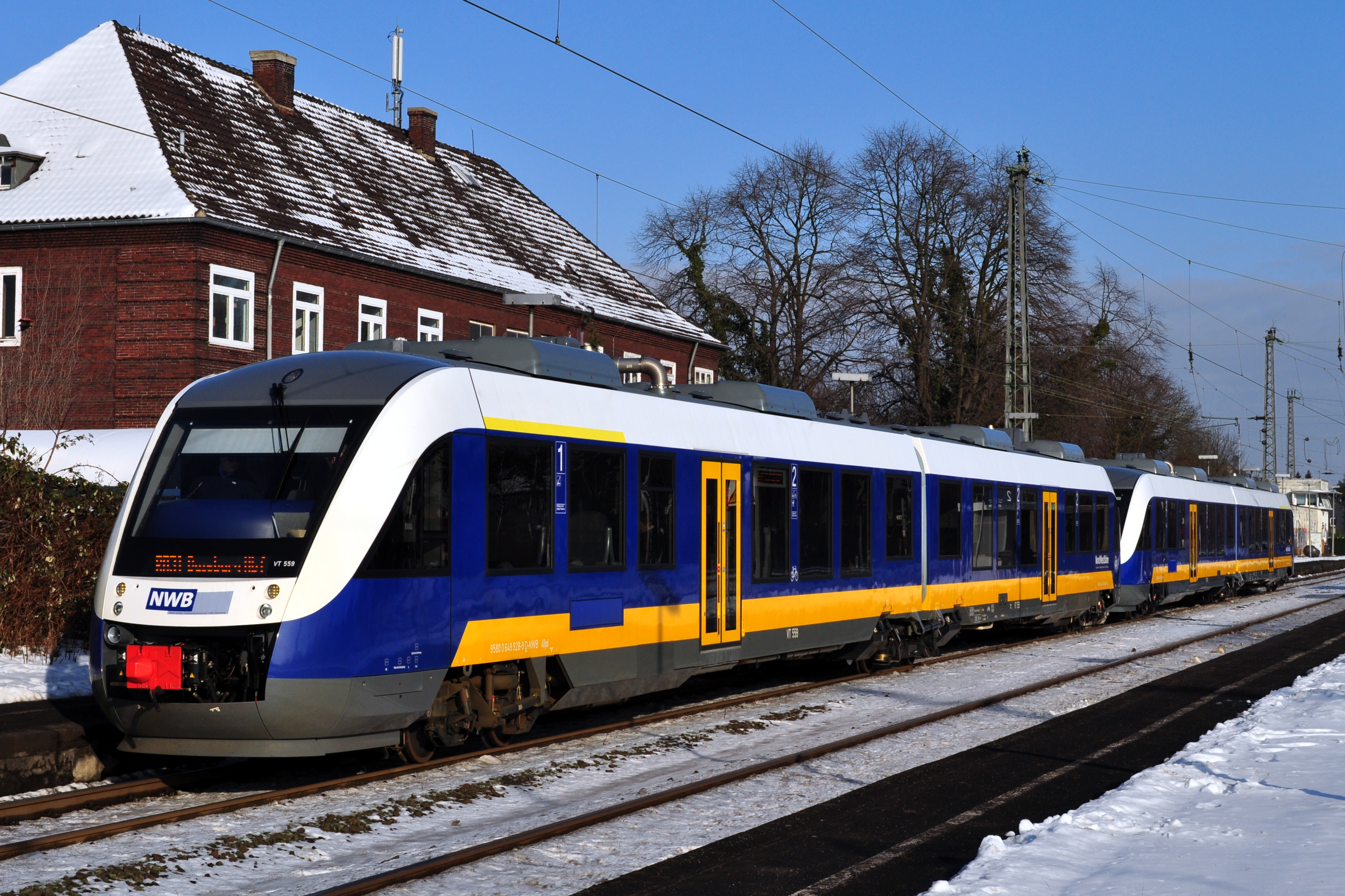
LINT 41 of the NWB in Trompet station
