= Oberhausen-Osterfeld Süd–Hamm railway =

Railway line in Germany

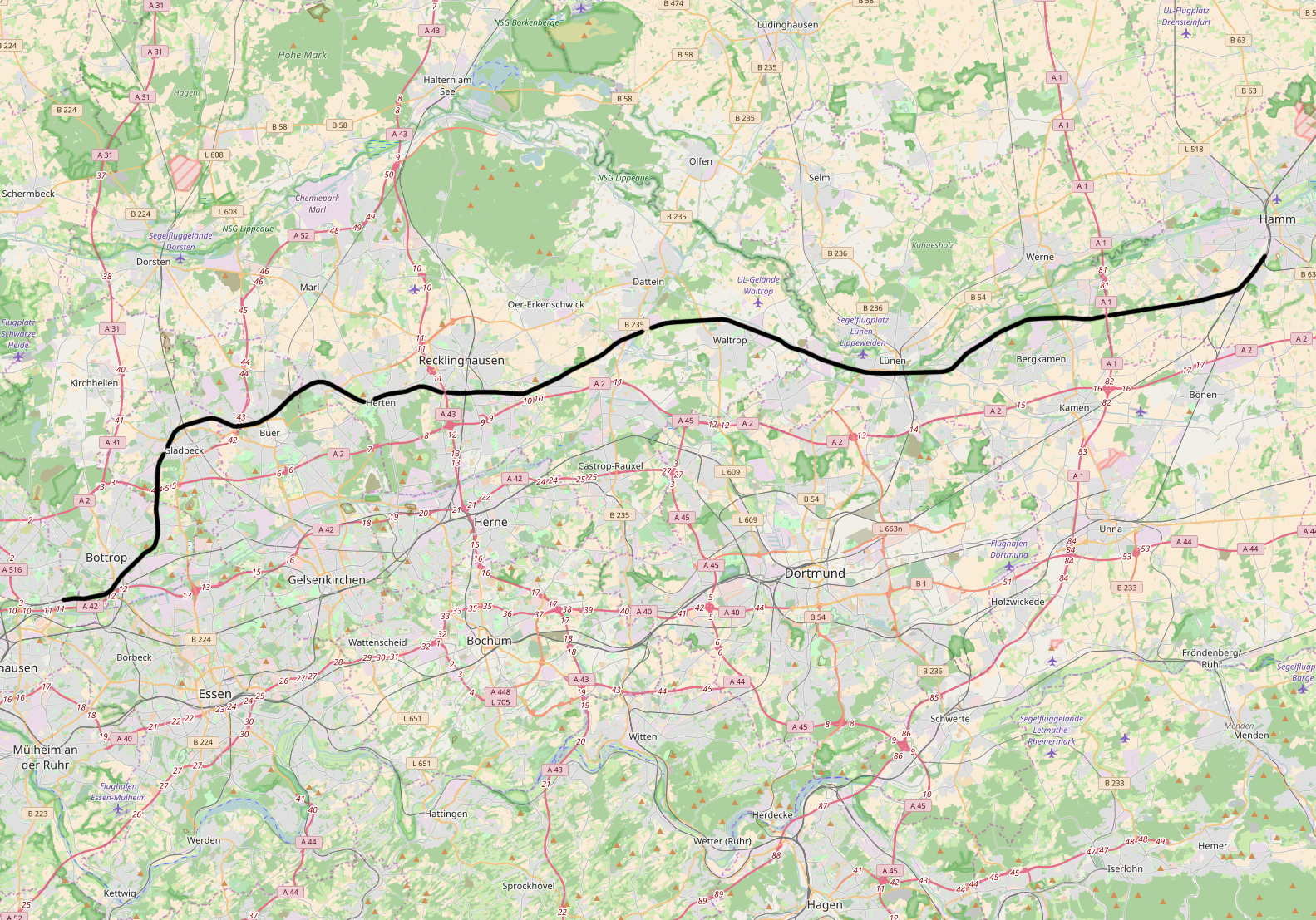

Overview
- Line number: 2250 (OB-Osterfeld Süd–Hamm); 2248 (E-Dellwig Ost–Bottrop); 2252 (GE-Buer Nord–Lippe)
- Locale: North Rhine-Westphalia, Germany

Service
- Route number: 423 (Bottrop – Gladbeck); 424 (OB-Osterfeld Süd – Bottrop); 450.9 (Bottrop – RE-Blumenthal)

Technical
- Line length: 77 km (48 mi)
- Number of tracks: 2 (throughout)
- Track gauge: 1,435 mm (4 ft 8 1/2 in) standard gauge
- Electrification: 15 kV/16.7 Hz AC overhead catenary
- Operating speed: 100 km/h (62 mph)

The Oberhausen-Osterfeld Süd–Hamm railway, also called the Hamm-Osterfeld line (German: Hamm-Osterfelder Bahn), is a 76-kilometre long double-track electrified main line railway at the northern edge of the Ruhr in the German state of North Rhine-Westphalia.

It has a continuous level route with no tunnels. Its eastern and central sections are now only used for freight, while its western section is also for passenger operations.

The main operator, Deutsche Bahn (formerly Deutsche Bundesbahn), has always referred to this line as the Nordstrecke ("northern line"). It was the northernmost route of the former railway division of Essen.

== History ==
The line was built to relieve the existing network of railways in the Ruhr region, which was at the limit of its capacity, especially for freight traffic. The line was opened on 1 May 1905. It served primarily as a direct connection between the two major marshalling yards of Hamm and Osterfeld Süd to allow long-distance freight trains to avoid the Ruhr and to enable new coal mines to be connected to the railway network. The second track was added 1912.

The passenger services were always planned to be thin, despite there being several major cities along the route, as the line was mainly intended for freight traffic. It never carried long-distance passenger services. The entire line was electrified in 1967. Passenger services on the section between Hamm and Gelsenkirchen-Buer Nord were discontinued on 29 May 1983. New S 9 line branch between Recklinghausen - Gladbeck - Bottrop - Hagen at 11. September 2020. Now no passenger service between Hamm and Blumenthal. The track is occasionally used, however, between Hamm and Horstmar junction as a detour route for passenger trains on the main Dortmund–Hamm line.

== Route ==
The line begins at Hamm station and the junction of the former tracks from the passenger station and the freight tracks at the western end of Hamm marshalling yard. At Herringen junction a connecting track from Hamm marshalling yard joins from the west. Shortly afterwards is Pelkum station where the colliery railway from RAG-Bergwerk Ost ends. The line to Oberaden station consists of two main tracks with four sets of points for passing. At Horstmar junction there is a single-track line connecting to Preußen station. In Lünen Süd there is still a disused freight yard with a hump and further west a loading facility for several industrial companies and a single-track line connecting line to Lünen Hauptbahnhof. Waltrop station has been completely closed.

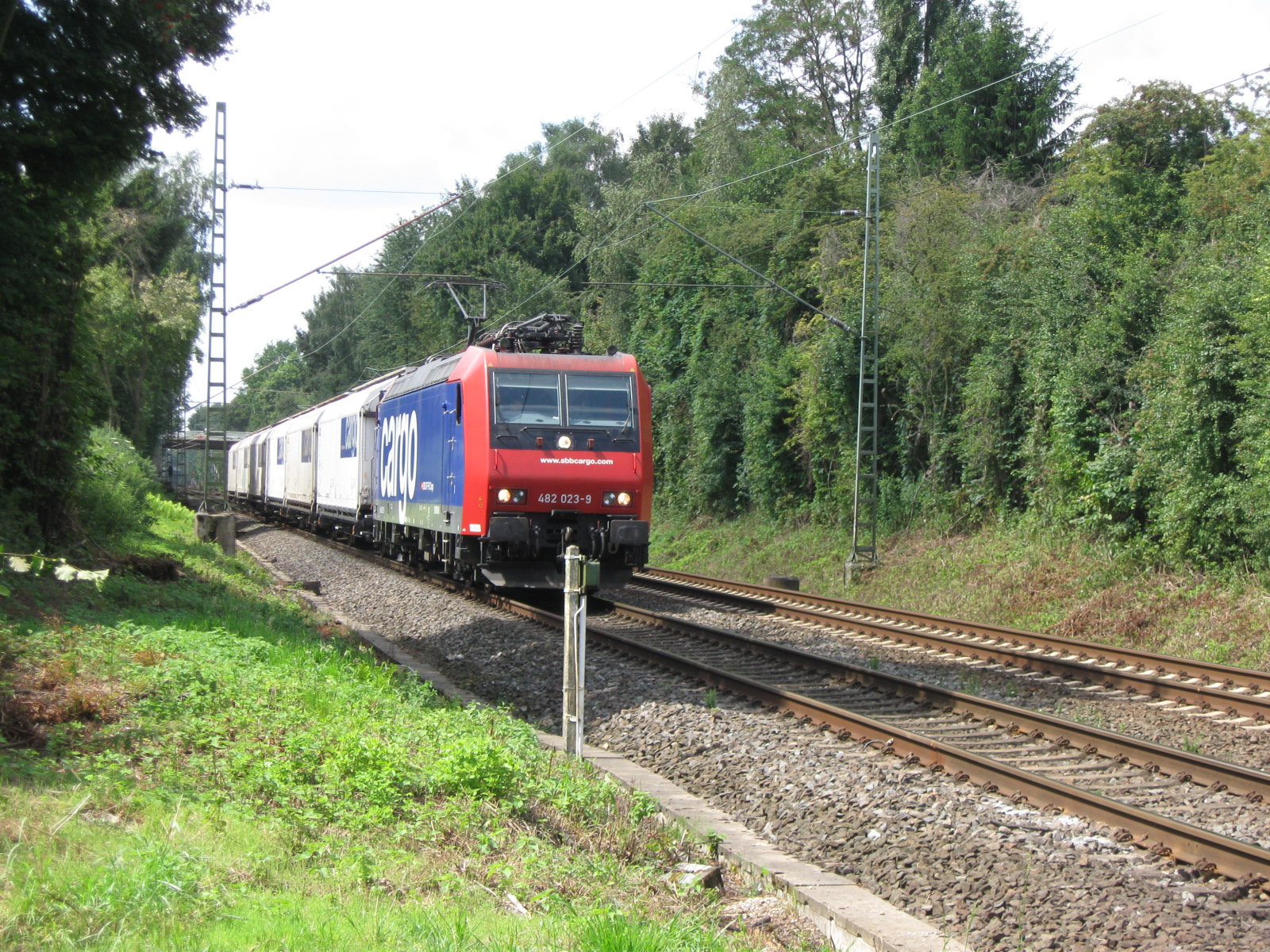
SBB class 482 locomotive in Recklinghausen-Suderwich

In Recklinghausen Ost there is an abandoned marshalling yard. There are single-track connecting route 2224 from the east to Recklinghausen Hauptbahnhof and connecting route 2222 Recklinghausen Süd, which were built in 1905 with the line. At branch Blumenthal there are a single-track connecting route 2223 to Recklinghausen Hauptbahnhof - served by the Rhine-Ruhr S-Bahn Line S 9 since September 11, 2020. New S-Bahn stop since Dezember 11, 2022 Herten (Westf). Planned new S-Bahn stop: Herten-Westerholt (end 2024). In Westerholt there is a transfer station to Zechen- und Hafenbahn der RBH Logistics (Mines and Port Railway).

At Gelsenkirchen-Buer Nord station the line joins a single-track line built in 1968 running from Lippe junction to the Wanne-Eickel–Hamburg line (the Gelsenkirchen-Buer Nord–Marl Lippe railway). Since 24 May 1998, these passenger services on the line have operated as Rhine-Ruhr S-Bahn line S 9 in direction Marl and Haltern am See. Planned new S-Bahn stop in direction Herten - Recklinghausen. (end 2024)

The Gladbeck West station today is now a junction station served by the S-Bahn (Recklinghausen / Haltern am See - Gladbeck West - Bottrop - Essen - Wuppertal - Hagen) and the regional services towards Dorsten - Borken / Coesfeld on the connecting line to Gladbeck-Zweckel on the Winterswijk–Gelsenkirchen-Bismarck railway. Separation station S-Bahn direction Herten - Recklinghausen or Marl - Haltern am See. North of the tracks is a freight loading facility with a now decommissioned hump for the Zechen- und Hafenbahn der RBH Logistics.

Bottrop Hauptbahnhof has been rebuilt several times since its inception. In the area of the freight yard, the line met the Emscher Valley Railway from Welver to Sterkrade of the former Royal Westphalian Railway Company, which was opened in 1879 and was closed in this area in 1968 and was dismantled by 1983, although part of the line operated as a colliery railway. The Hauptbahnhof freight yard still contains a (now abandoned) marshalling yard and a railway sleeper plant. Near the station the single track line to Essen-Dellwig Ost and the mostly double track line via Gerschede and Essen Frintrop (old) junctions to Oberhausen West branch off. The line continues towards Oberhausen-Osterfeld Süd station as a two-track freight line and a separate single-track passenger line.

At the end of the line is located Oberhausen-Osterfeld Süd station, including one of the largest railway yards of the region, whose importance for passengers is, however, marginal. In Ostkopf the line joins the Emscher Valley Railway from Dortmund to Duisburg-Ruhrort, the one built by the former Cologne-Minden Railway Company. Its western end connects over a two-track freight rail line to Oberhausen West and over a two-track freight and passenger line to Grafenbusch junction, where it connects over a single-track freight line to Oberhausen-Sterkrade via the Holland line, Oberhausen–Wesel–Emmerich–Arnhem, and a single-track passenger line (line 2272) to Oberhausen Hauptbahnhof.

== Current operations ==
Today the following passenger services use part of the line:

Line	Route
S9	Recklinghausen / Haltern – **Gelsenkirchen-Buer Nord*** (*only towards Haltern) – **Gladbeck West** – **Bottrop Hbf** – Essen-Dellwig Ost – Essen Hbf – Essen-Steele – Wuppertal Hbf – Hagen
RE 14	Coesfeld (Westf) / Borken (Westf) – Dorsten - **Gladbeck West** – **Bottrop** – Essen-Borbeck – Essen Hbf – Essen-Steele
RE 44	**Bottrop Hbf** – **Oberhausen-Osterfeld Süd** – Oberhausen Hbf – Moers
**bold: Hamm-Osterfeld line** – normal: adjacent tracks– italics: other lines

Special 15 minutes interval RE 14 / S 9 service: Gladbeck West – Bottrop Hbf – Essen-Borbeck – Essen Hbf – Essen-Steele

Gladbeck West is a separation station towards Recklinghausen, Haltern am See and Dorsten

There is no longer a direct passenger train connection between Gelsenkirchen-Buer Nord and Oberhausen, so passengers on this route are forced to change in Gladbeck West or Bottrop.

Rail freight on the Hamm-Osterfeld route, although declining, is still important on its entire length.
