= Moers station =

Railway station in Moers, Germany

Moers
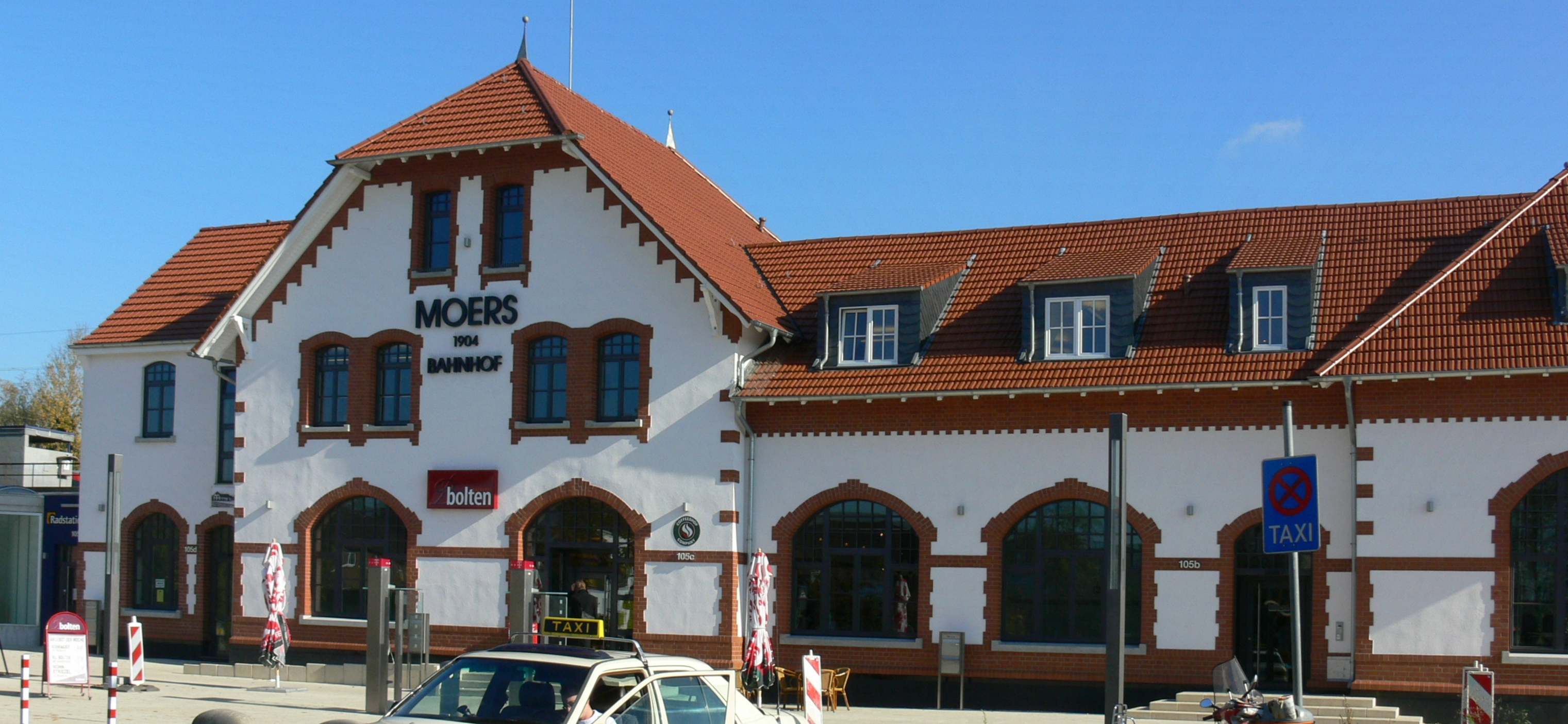

General information
- Location: Moers, NRW; Germany
- Coordinates: 51°27′04″N 6°38′30″E
- Owner: Deutsche Bahn
- Operator: DB Netz; DB Station&Service
- Lines: Duisburg–Xanten (9.4 km); DU-Meiderich Nord–Hohenbudberg (freight); Moers District Railway; Krefeld Railway Company
- Platforms: 4

Construction
- Accessible: Yes

Other information
- Station code: 4148
- DS100 code: KMO
- Category: 5
- Fare zone: VRR: 221
- Website: www.bahnhof.de

History
- Opened: 1883 (original); 1904/1908 (current location)

Services
Preceding station	NordWestBahn	Following station
Terminus	RE 44	Rheinhausen towards Bottrop Hbf
Rheinberg (Rheinl) towards Xanten	RB 31	Trompet towards Duisburg Hbf
Location

Moers station is located on the Lower Rhine Railway, which was built in 1904 by the Prussian state railways. It lies on the eastern edge of central Moers in the German state of North Rhine-Westphalia on the road to Duisburg-Homberg. The station is now a stop for Regional-Express service RE 44 and Regionalbahn service RB 31. It is classified by Deutsche Bahn as a category 5 station.

Behind the station building of 1904 there are the four platform tracks at a 230-metre-long platform and a 239-metre-long platform, both 38 cm high. Opposite the station building on the other side of the station forecourt is the platform of the station of the former Moers District Railway (German: Moerser Kreisbahn), now owned by the Niederrheinische Verkehrsbetriebe (Lower Rhine Transport Operations, NIAG). It is still used for special excursions.

Sidings branch at Moers station to NIAG's workshop and the Vossloh service center in Moers.

== History ==
The first station of Moers was east of the present station on the line from the Ruhrort–Homberg train ferry to Moers, which opened in 1883. The station was moved to its present location between 1904 and 1908. The line to Homberg was closed in 1908 and replaced by a tram line.

In 1882, the station of the Krefeld Railway Company (Krefelder Eisenbahn-Gesellschaft) was built on the other side of the station forecourt. From there, trains ran via Niep and Hüls to Krefeld. A transfer track was built north of the station to the state railway in 1886. Passenger services were closed temporarily from 1932 to 1939 and permanently from 3 October 1949. Freight operations to Moers were closed on 15 February 1974 and the track was dismantled afterwards.

West of this station on the station forecourt, the terminal station of the Moerser Kreisbahn (Moers District Railway) operated from 1909 on the lines to Hörstgen-Sevelen and to Rheinberg via Orsoy. Regularly scheduled passenger service were abandoned on 28 September 1968. Again, there was a transfer track to the state railway north of the station, which is also still used today.

Construction work to modernise the station began in June 2014. The passenger tunnel, which previously connected the platforms only to the entrance building, was extended to give access on the other side, lifts were installed, the platforms were raised and new platform canopies were installed. The extension of the shell of the passenger tunnel to the platforms was completed in May 2015. Work on the passenger tunnel had been completed in December 2018, except for the installation of the lifts to the platforms.

== Rail services ==
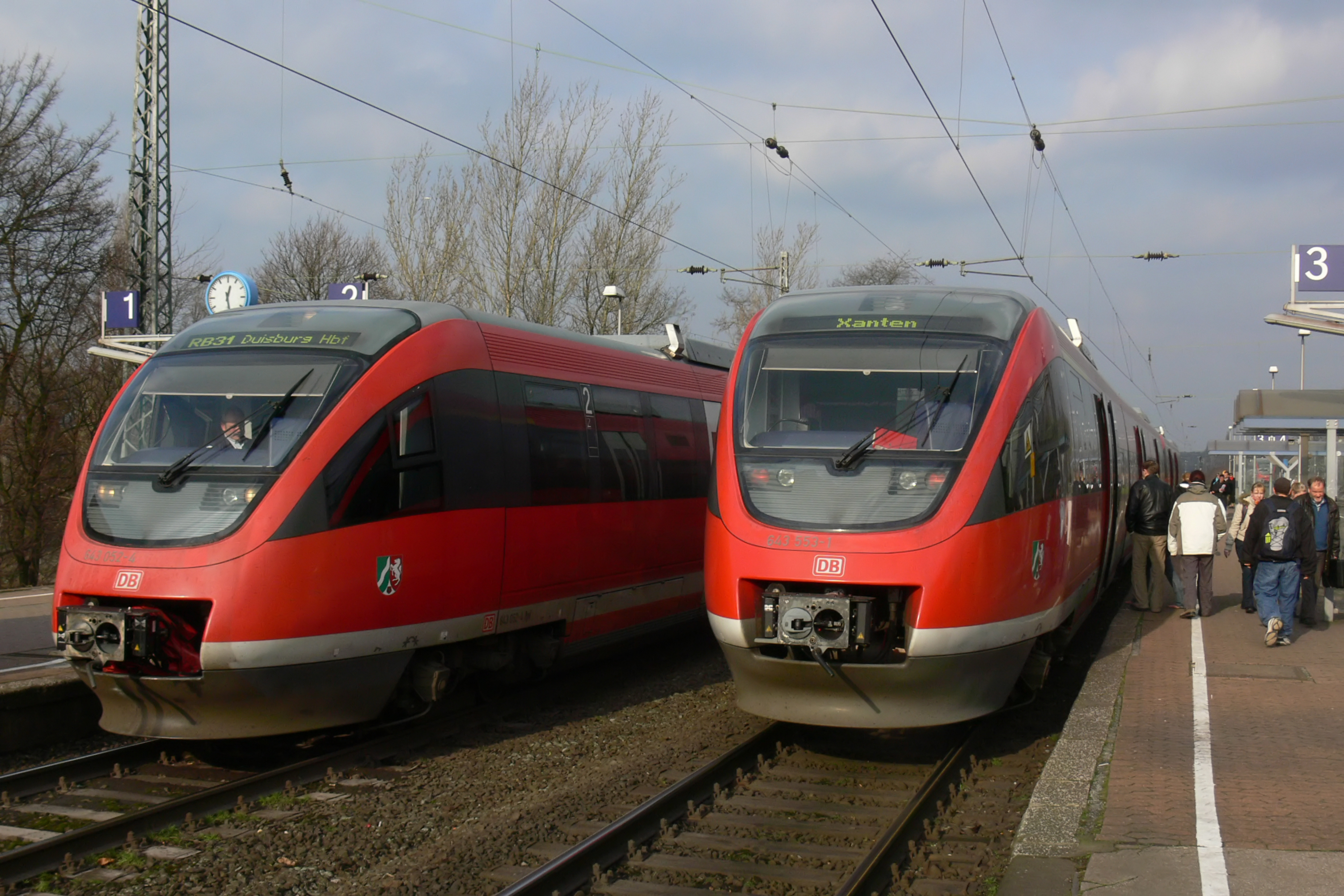
RB 31 of DB in Moers station

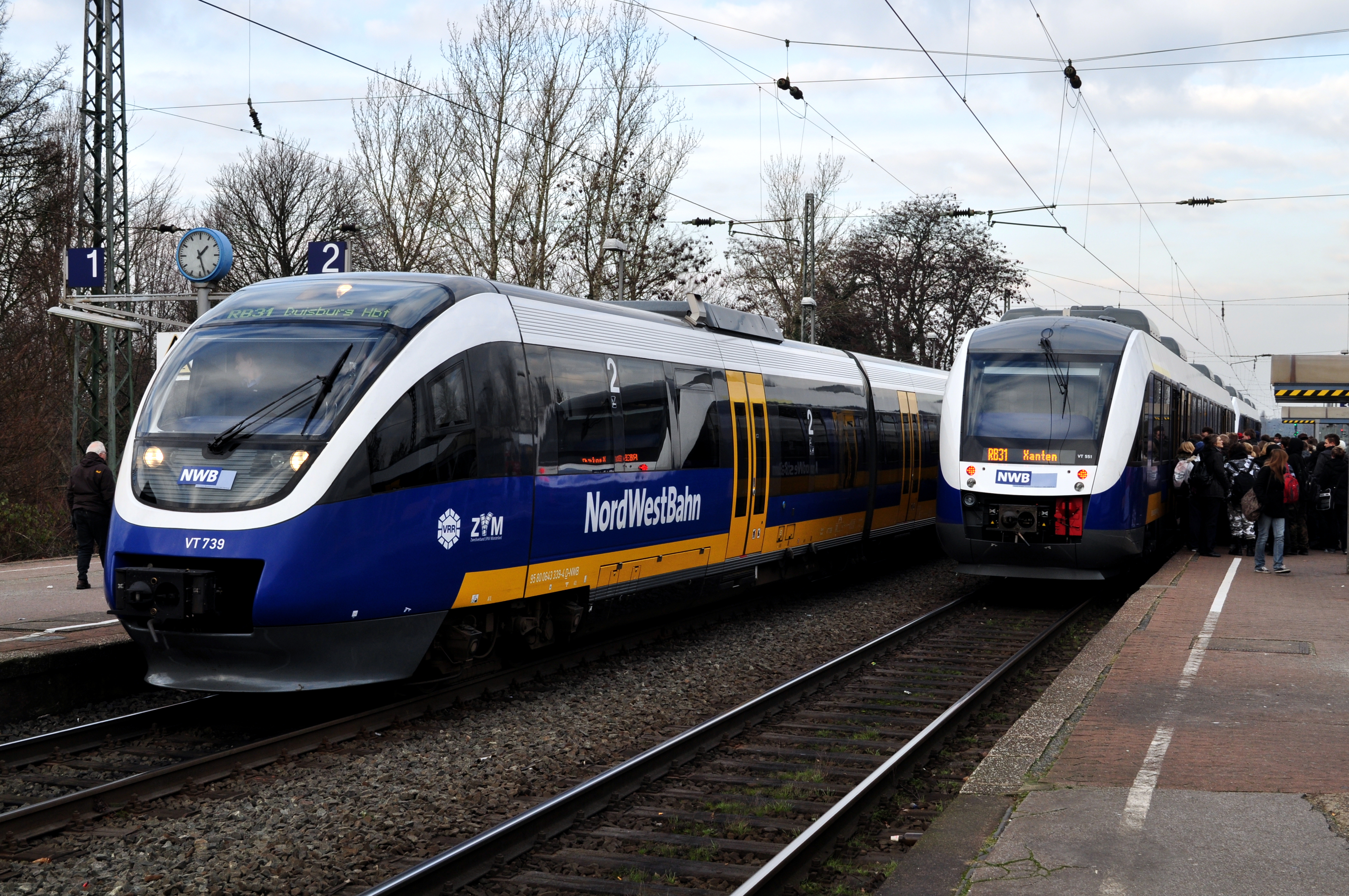
RB 31 of NWB in Moers station

The station is served by the Regionalbahn service RB 31, Der Niederrheiner. It is also called the Hippeland-Express, after the original name of the Lower Rhine Railway. The RB 31 runs hourly from Duisburg via Moers to Xanten. An additional RB 31 service runs hourly between Duisburg and Moers, together providing a service every 30 minutes in this section. On Saturdays, Sundays and public holidays runs hourly remove a train connection of the RB31 line from Der Niederrheiner from Duisburg via Moers to Kamp-Lintfort Süd Landesgartenschau 2020 From May 16, 2020, to October 11, 2020, The RE 44 (Fossa-Emscher-Express) also runs hourly between Bottrop and Moers via Duisburg. Both services are operated by NordWestBahn. In addition, freight traffic operates through Moers station on a route from Duisburg-Beeck to Duisburg-Rheinhausen.

== Bus services ==
The Moers Bahnhof bus stop is located next to the station. The stop is served by the buses of the NIAG, which has an administration building east of the station, and the buses of SWK MOBIL, Regionalverkehr Niederrhein and Duisburger Verkehrsgesellschaft (DVG). Buses run to central Moers and to Duisburg, Kamp-Lintfort, Krefeld, Neukirchen-Vluyn, Rheinberg, Rheurdt and Wesel.

Line	Route	Operator
4	Hülsdonk Hauptfriedhof – Königlicher Hof – Moers Bf – Meerbeck – Eick – Repelen Markt	NIAG
7	Moers Bf – Königlicher Hof – Hülsdonk – Neukirchen-Vluyn – Rheurdt – Kamp-Lintfort	NIAG
32	Moers Bf – Königlicher Hof – Utfort – Kamp-Lintfort – Sevelen – Issum – Geldern Bf	NIAG
052	Moers Bf – Königlicher Hof – Kapellen – KR-Traar – KR-Verberg – Krefeld Hbf – KR-Oppum	SWK
68	Moers Bf - Königlicher Hof - Utfort - Rheinkamp - Rheinberg - Rhb.-Ossenberg - Rhb.-Borth - Wes.-Büderich - Wesel Bf	RVN
911	DU-Ruhrort – DU-Homberg – Moers Bf – Königlicher Hof – Utfort – Repelen – Kamp-Lintfort	NIAG
912	DU-Rheinhausen – DU-Homberg – Moers Bf – Königlicher Hof – Hülsdonk – Neukirchen-Vluyn	NIAG
913	Hülsdonk Gewerbegebiet – Königlicher Hof – Moers Bf – Meerbeck – DU-Baerl – Rhb.-Vierbaum – Rhb.-Orsoy – Rhb.-Budberg – Rheinberg – Rhb.-Annaberg	NIAG
914	Königlicher Hof – Moers Bf – Schwafheim – DU-Bergheim – DU-Rheinhausen – Logport – DU-Friemersheim – DU-Gewerbegebiet Hohenbudberg	NIAG
921	Königlicher Hof – Moers Bf – Asberg – DU-Bergheim – DU-Rheinhausen – DU-Hochfeld – Duisburg Hbf	NIAG/DVG
929	Duisburg Hbf – DU-Ruhrort – DU-Homberg – Asberg – Moers Bf – Königlicher Hof – Hülsdonk – Neukirchen-Vluyn – Straelen-Herongen – Venlo Station	NIAG
NE6	Moers Bf – Königlicher Hof – Kapellen – KR-Traar – KR-Verberg – Krefeld Hbf – KR-Oppum – Meerbusch-Bösinghoven	SWK
