= Duisburg-Ruhrort–Dortmund railway =

Railway line in Germany

Duisburg-Ruhrort–Dortmund

Overview
- Other name(s): Cologne-Minden Emscher Valley Railway
- Native name: Köln-Mindener Emschertalbahn
- Line number: 2206 (Duisburg-Ruhrort–Gelsenkirchen-Bickern); 2260 (Duisburg-Neumühl–Grafenbusch); 2205 (Gelsenkirchen-Bickern–Wanne-Eickel); 2208 (Wanne-Eickel–Herne); (Herne–Castrop-Rauxel Süd); 2210 (Castrop-Rauxel Süd–Dortmund)
- Locale: North Rhine-Westphalia, Germany

Service
- Route number: 447 (Duisburg-Ruhrort); 423 (Grafenbusch–Bottrop); 426 (Gelsenkirchen-Bickern–Dortmund)

Technical
- Line length: 61 km (38 mi)
- Track gauge: 1,435 mm (4 ft 8 1/2 in) standard gauge
- Electrification: 15 kV/16.7 Hz AC overhead catenary
- Operating speed: 100 km/h (62.1 mph) (maximum)

The Duisburg-Ruhrort–Dortmund railway (also called the Cologne-Minden Emscher Valley Railway) was built by the Cologne-Minden Railway Company (Cöln-Mindener Eisenbahn-Gesellschaft, CME) in the area to the north of its original Ruhr line to improve connections to mines and factories in the northern Ruhr region, which is now in the German state of North Rhine-Westphalia.

The track at the time of the Deutsche Reichsbahn mostly consisted of at least two tracks; now two-track, single track and completely dismantled sections alternate. The section from Oberhausen-Sterkrade to Herne was electrified between 1963 and 1975.

== History ==
For a long time the main focus of the CME was on regional routes in the Rhineland and Westphalia. With the migration of the coal mining industry north from the vicinity of the Ruhr to the Emscher, the area between the two rivers became more of interest to the CME.

The CME began the construction of two lines, starting from the stations of Herne and Wanne on its trunk line. These ultimately connected to form a continuous line from Duisburg-Ruhrort to Dortmund with a long section along the Emscher, leading to it be called the "Cologne-Minden Emscher Valley Railway" (Köln-Mindener Emschertalbahn).

=== Wanne–Herne ===
In 1866, the CME completed the rebuilding of the busy section between the stations of Pluto (called Wanne CME from 1869 and now called Wanne-Eickel Hauptbahnhof) and Herne CME (now called Herne station) with four tracks. It also had sidings, including to the Pluto colliery west of Wanne.

=== Wanne–Ruhrort ===
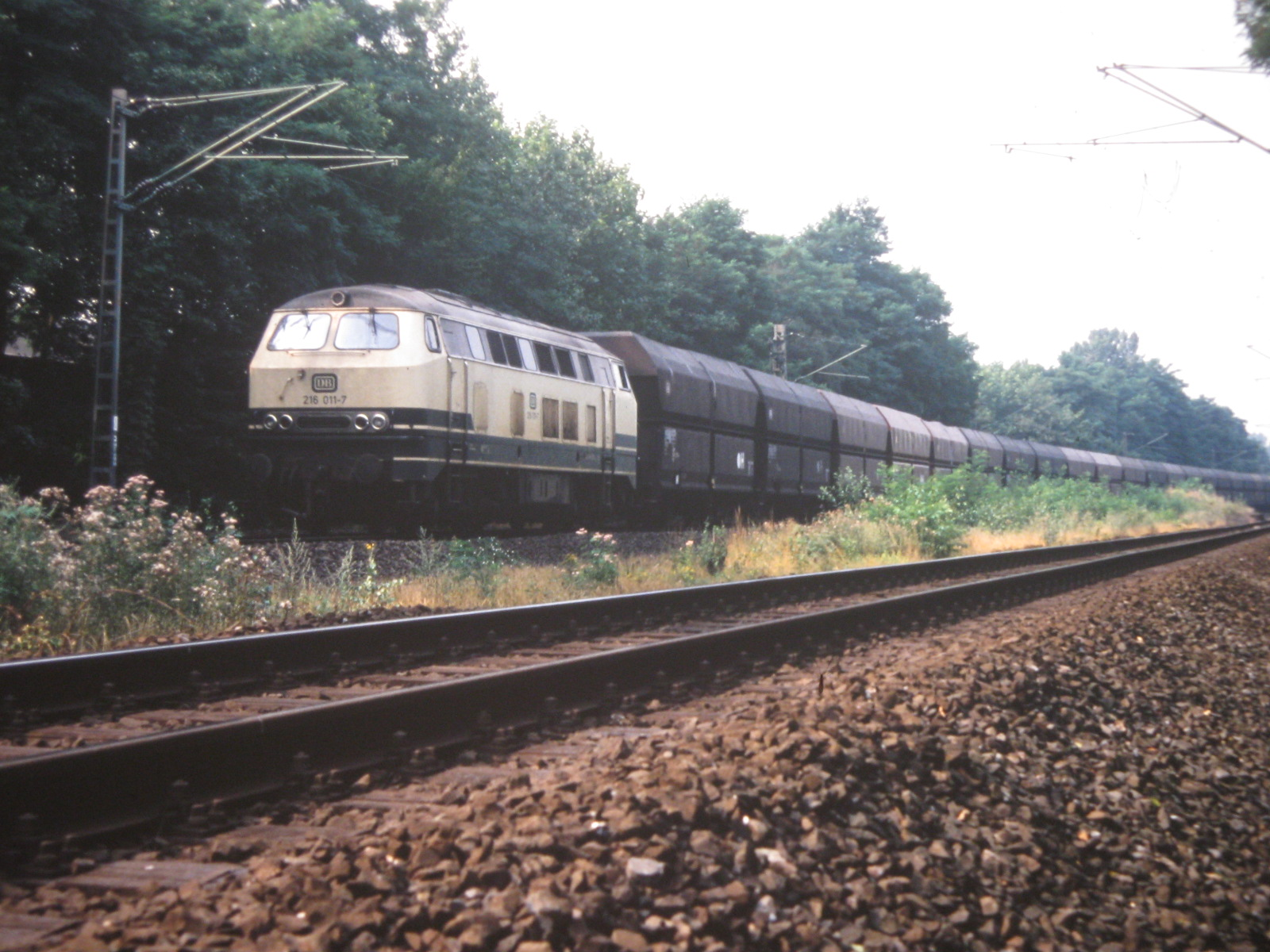
DB 216 011-7 on the Gelsenkirchen Schalke–Oberhausen-Osterfeld Süd line near Essen-Karnap, August 1989

On the western section of the line, the CME established Wanne CME station in 1867, which soon became a railway junction. The first section to Schalke CME (now Gelsenkirchen-Schalke operations depot) was opened on 7 November 1871 for freight. Two years later, on 15 November 1873, this was followed by the second section from Osterfeld CME (now Oberhausen-Osterfeld Süd) station to Sterkrade CME (now Oberhausen-Sterkrade) station. The first passenger trains ran from Sterkrade CME, which had served passengers on the Arnhem-Oberhausen railway since 1856, to Wanne on 1 July 1874.

The last section from Ruhrort CME (now Duisburg-Ruhrort station) was opened on 1 July 1875, at first for freight and also for passengers from 15 October 1875.

Finally, on 1 December 1878, a direct connection was opened between Grafenbusch junction and Neumühl station so that freight trains could pass through Sterkrade without reversing.

=== Herne–Dortmund ===
The eastern section of the line had previously been used as siding to the Erin colliery. This ran at first from Herne CME station for several kilometres parallel to the CME’s original line. With the establishment of Castrop (Stadt) station on 1 December 1874, this siding was converted from a freight siding into a line for general traffic.

By the beginning of 1878, the CME had extended the line via Merklinde (now Dortmund Bövinghausen) and Marten CME (now Dortmund-Marten) to Huckarde CME (now Dortmund-Huckarde) to the area of Dortmund freight yard, where it connected back to the original CME line to Dortmund CME (now Dortmund Hauptbahnhof). Passenger trains ran between Herne CME and Dortmund CME from 1 April 1878.

== Operations ==
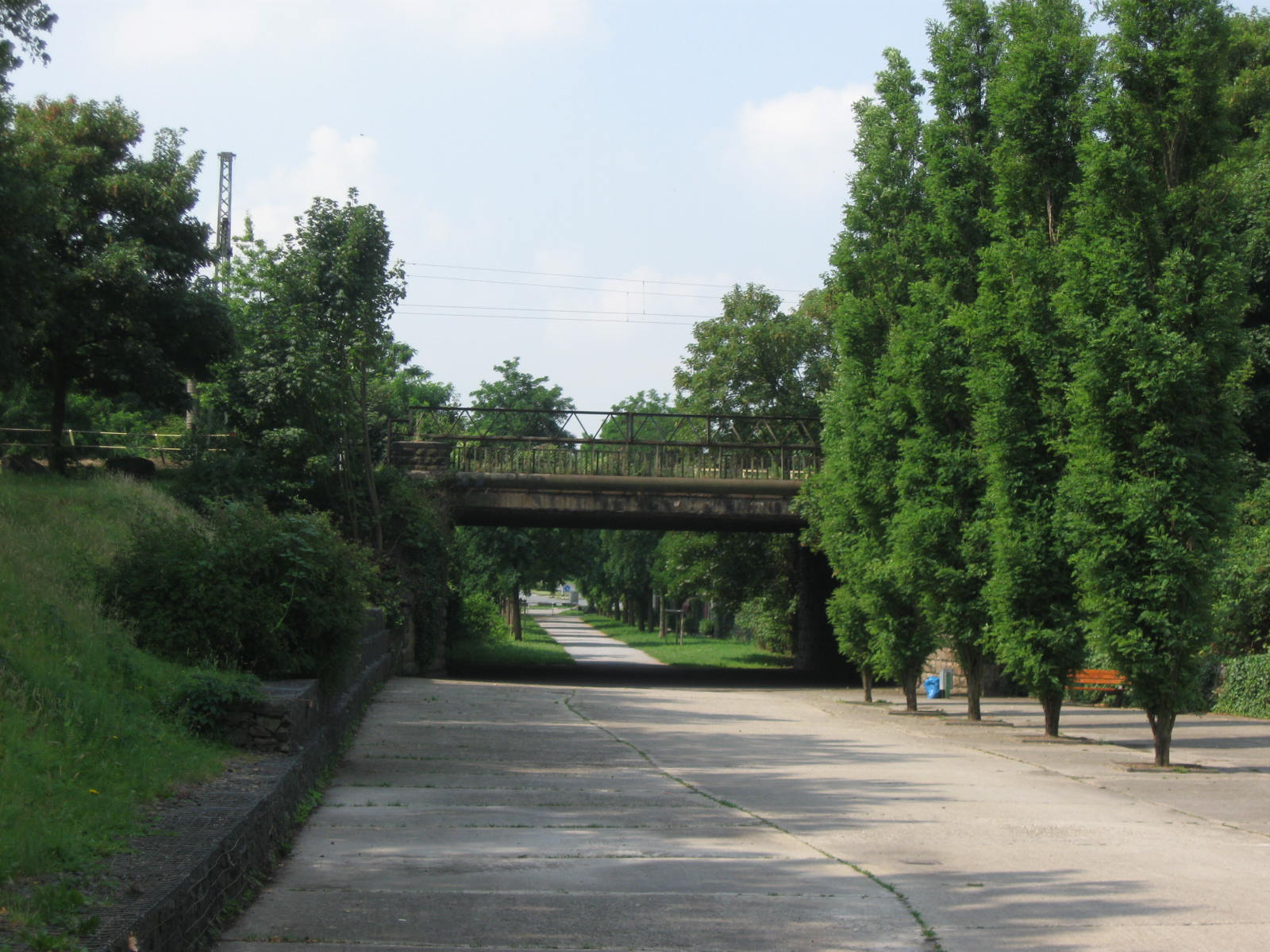
Former route, passing under the Meiderich Süd–Beeck freight line in Duisburg-Meiderich

The section between Dortmund and Herne is not electrified and has sections of single track. Passenger services are mainly operated as Regionalbahn service RB 43 (Emschertal Bahn) from Dortmund to Dorsten.

The long section between Herne and Oberhausen-Sterkrade is now continuously electrified. Until Wanne-Eickel Central Station and from Nordstern junction it is continuously double-track and almost exclusively used by freight trains.

The Regionalbahn service RB 44 (Der Dorstener) from Oberhausen Central Station to Dorsten runs on a short section between Oberhausen-Osterfeld Süd and Grafenbusch junction, although strictly speaking, this is a remnant of the Bergisch-Märkische Emscher Valley Railway.

== Current situation ==
From Oberhausen-Sterkrade station and from Grafenbusch junction to the former Duisburg-Ruhrort Hafen station, the line is now completely closed and dismantled. A pedestrian and cycle path (the Grüner Pfad, "green path") has been built on the former track to the Landschaftspark Duisburg-Nord ("Duisburg North Landscape Park"). A commercial area is located on the site of the former Duisburg-Neumühl station.

It has long been planned that line S4 of the Rhine-Ruhr S-Bahn would be extended in tunnel from Dortmund-Lütgendortmund station to immediately south of Dortmund-Bövinghausen station and it would then take over passenger operations on the Duisburg-Ruhrort–Dortmund line (which would be electrified) from Bövinghausen to Herne and the Herne–Essen branch of the current line S2. The RB 43 service would then only run between Herne and Dorsten. The eastern section of the Duisburg-Ruhrort–Dortmund line between Dortmund-Bövinghausen and Dortmund Hauptbahnhof would be used by a new line of the Dortmund Stadtbahn. For a long time funds have been available for the construction of the line to Bövinghausen, however, the financing for the operation of the line is not guaranteed. The Emschertal Bahn service runs between Dortmund-Bövinghausen and Herne every hour, but the S2 would run between Herne and Essen every twenty minutes as an S-Bahn service, so the Verkehrsverbund Rhein-Ruhr would have to fund the increased services through savings in other areas. Upon taking office, the transport minister Oliver Wittke called for all such proposals to be re-evaluated. The project has been removed from the integrated transportation plan for North Rhine-Westphalia; a resubmission is possible from 2015.
