= Marl (disambiguation) =

Marl is type of calcium carbonate or lime-rich sedimentary rock.

Marl or MARL may also refer to:

== People ==
- Marl Young (1917–2009), American musician and arranger
- Marley Marl (born 1962), a hip hop record producer

== Places ==
=== Europe ===
- Marl, North Rhine-Westphalia, a city in Germany
  - Marl Chemical Park, large chemical works in Marl, Germany
  - Marl-Hamm station, railway station in Marl
  - Marl Mitte station, railway station in Marl
  - Marl-Sinsen station, railway station in Marl
- Marl, Lower Saxony, a municipality in Germany
- Marl (Conwy electoral ward), in North Wales, UK

=== North America ===
- Marl Creek Provincial Park, British Columbia, Canada
- Marl Hill, an historic building in Virginia
- Marl Lake, a small lake in Michigan
- Marl Mountains, Mojave National Preserve, California

== Science ==
- Marl, another name for the western barred bandicoot
- Marl Formation, geologic formation in France
- Marl prairie, a type of wetland found in the Everglades, Florida
- Marl Slate Formation, a geologic formation in England
- Multi-agent reinforcement learning (MARL), a sub-field in machine learning

== Other uses ==
- Marl Kingdom, a series of video games by Nippon-Ichi
- Marl yarn is made from strands of different-colored yarn twisted together
- Melbourne Airport rail link, planned railway line in Melbourne, Australia
- USS Marl (IX-160), a barge of the United States Navy

== See also ==
- Marle (disambiguation)
