= Nottuln-Appelhülsen station =

Railway station in Nottuln, Germany

Nottuln-Appelhülsen
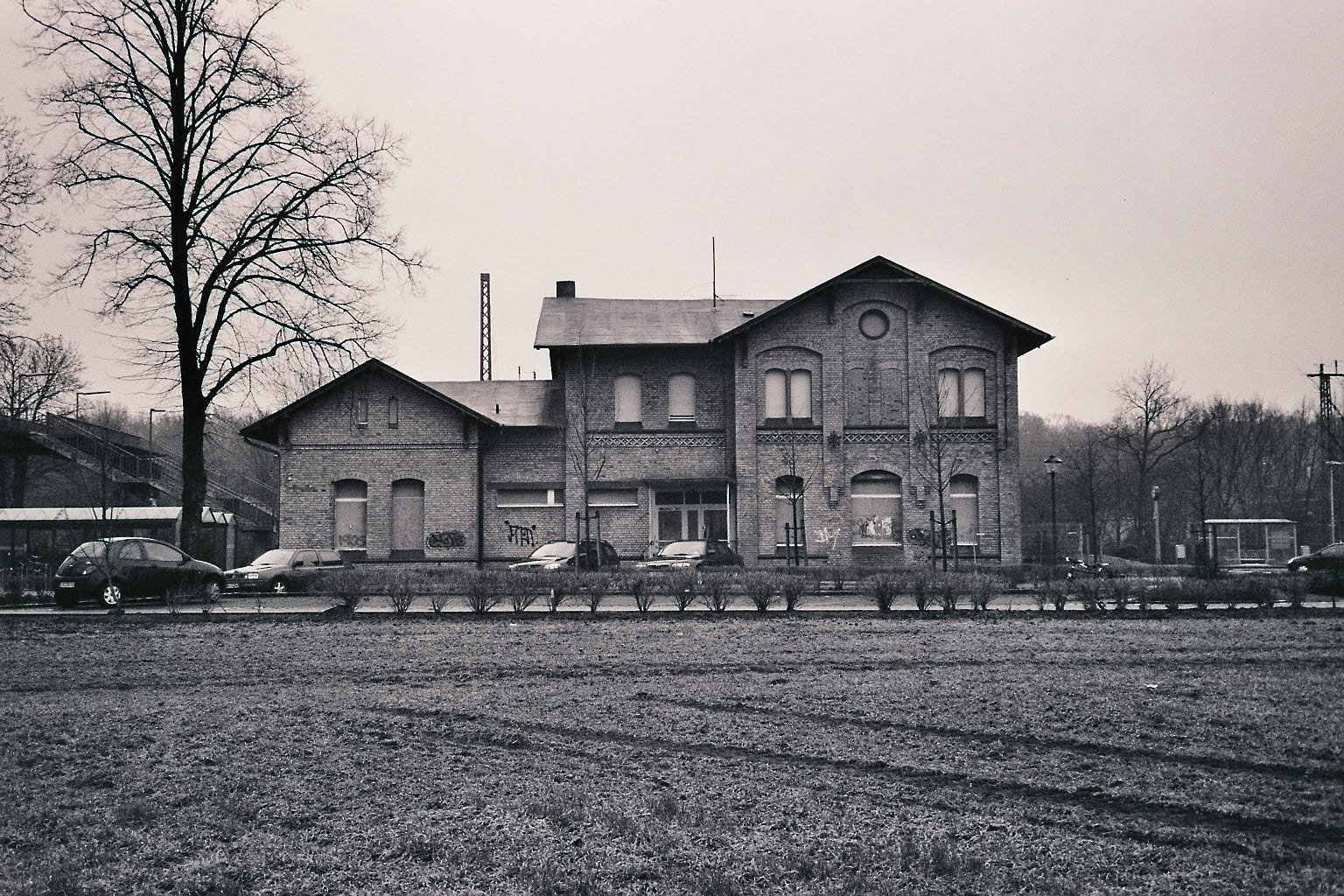
- Station building

General information
- Location: Bahnhofstr. 59, Appelhülsen, Nottuln, North Rhine-Westphalia; Germany
- Coordinates: 51°53′32″N 7°25′34″E
- Line: Wanne-Eickel Hbf – Hamburg Hbf
- Platforms: 2

Construction
- Accessible: Yes

Other information
- Station code: 167
- DS100 code: EAPH
- IBNR: 8000595
- Category: 4
- Fare zone: Westfalentarif: 55535
- Website: www.bahnhof.de

History
- Opened: 1 January 1870
- Former names: Appelhülsen

Services
Preceding station	DB Regio NRW	Following station
Buldern towards Düsseldorf Hbf	RE 2	Bösensell towards Osnabrück Hbf
Buldern towards Mönchengladbach Hbf	RE 42	Bösensell towards Münster Hbf
Location

Nottuln-Appelhülsen is a station in Appelhülsen, a suburb of the municipality of Nottuln, in the district of Coesfeld in the German state of Nordrhein-Westfalen.

== History ==
The Cologne-Minden Railway Company (Köln-Mindener Eisenbahn-Gesellschaft, CME) received a concession to build the railway from Wanne to Osnabrück on 28 May 1866. This was part of the Hamburg–Venlo railway, which in turn was part of an international Paris–Hamburg railway. On 1 January 1870, the CME commenced passenger services on the first section between Wanne station (now Wanne-Eickel Hauptbahnhof) and Münster station (now Münster (Westfalen) Hauptbahnhof) on its trunk line. Appelhülsen station was opened at the same time.

The importance of the station for the transport of passengers and freight in Appelhülsen and the surrounding area was so great that it was classified as a second class station. After Buldern and Bösensell stations received freight facilities, it was reclassified as a third class station.

Until 1942, Appelhülsen station was the only railway station between Münster and Dülmen. It included a workshop and a carpenter's workshop, with up to 30 people working at the time. General freight traffic was stopped in 1973. The station came under the control of Dülmen station in 1974. The signal box was replaced by an electronic interlocking, which is remotely controlled from Dülmen, in 1998. The signal box was demolished in November 2000. The name of the station was changed from Appelhülsen to Nottuln-Appelhülsen in 2004. A new pedestrian crossing was built over the railway tracks as part of the renovation of the station in 2012. The parking lots and bicycle stands were expanded in the autumn of 2013.

== Station building ==
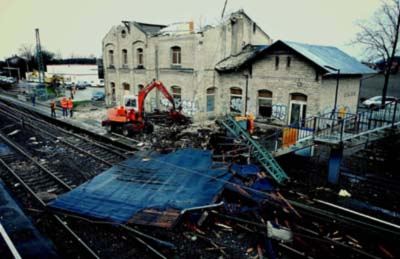
Station building after damage from cyclone Kyrill

The station building was built of yellow bricks in 1870 together with the rest of the station. The station restaurant was closed in 1970 and the ticket office was closed 1975. The municipality of Nottuln acquired the heritage-listed entrance building in 1999. All attempts to sell the building, including over eBay, were unsuccessful. On 18 January 2007, the roof of the station building was so badly damaged by extratropical cyclone Kyrill that it had to be demolished in April 2007 for safety reasons.

The municipality of Nottuln had listed the building as a monument.

== Operations ==
=== Passenger services ===
The station is served only by regional services of the so-called Haard-Achse network: the RE 2 Rhein-Haard-Express (Münster (Westf) Hbf – Düsseldorf Hbf) and the RE 42 Niers-Haard-Express (Münster (Westf) Hbf – Mönchengladbach Hbf). Both lines are operated by DB Regio AG, Region NRW as part of the Rhein-Haard network.

Line	Route	Interval
RE 2	Rhein-Haard-Express: Münster Hbf – Münster-Albachten – Bösensell – Nottuln-Appelhülsen – Buldern – Dülmen – Sythen – Haltern am See – Marl-Sinsen – Recklinghausen Hbf – Wanne-Eickel Hbf – Gelsenkirchen Hbf – Essen Hbf – Mülheim Hbf – Duisburg Hbf – Düsseldorf Airport – Düsseldorf Hbf; Status: December 2015 timetable	60 min
RE 42	Niers-Haard-Express: Münster Hbf – Münster-Albachten – Bösensell – Nottuln-Appelhülsen – Buldern – Dülmen – Sythen – Haltern am See – Marl-Sinsen – Recklinghausen Hbf – Recklinghausen Süd – Wanne-Eickel Hbf – Gelsenkirchen Hbf – Essen Hbf – Mülheim Hbf – Duisburg Hbf – Rheinhausen – Krefeld-Uerdingen – Krefeld Hbf – Viersen – Mönchengladbach Hbf; Status: December 2016 timetable	60 min
