= Gelsenkirchen-Hassel station =

Railway station in Germany

Gelsenkirchen Hassel
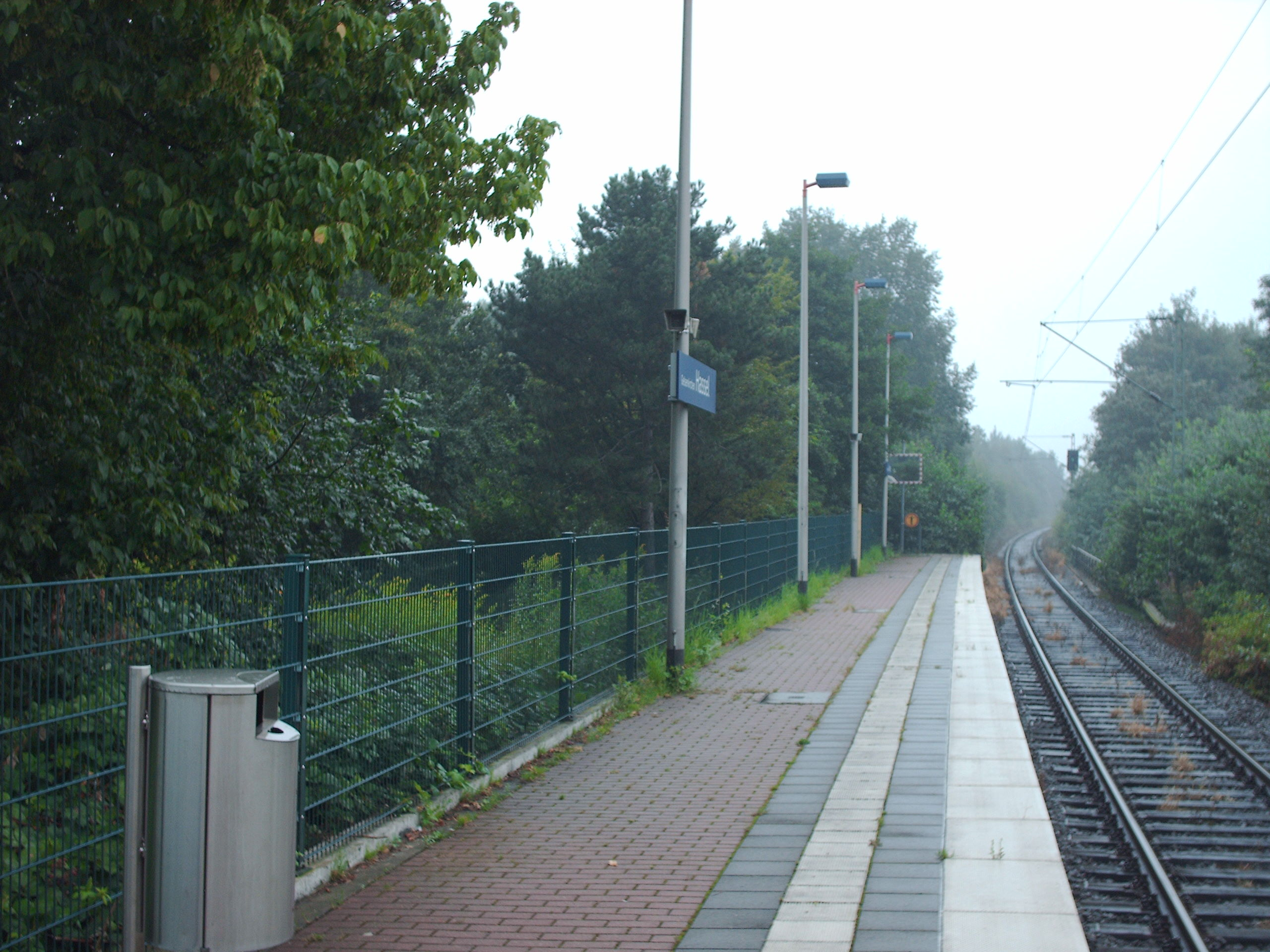

General information
- Location: Eppmannsweg 98, Gelsenkirchen, NRW; Germany
- Coordinates: 51°36′37″N 7°03′58″E
- Line: Gelsenkirchen–Marl Lippe
- Platforms: 1

Construction
- Accessible: Yes

Other information
- Station code: 2056
- DS100 code: EGHS
- IBNR: 8002226
- Category: 6
- Fare zone: VRR: 268
- Website: www.bahnhof.de

History
- Opened: 27 September 1968

Services
Preceding station	Rhine-Ruhr S-Bahn	Following station
Marl Mitte towards Haltern am See	S9	Gelsenkirchen-Buer Nord towards Hagen Hbf
Location

Gelsenkirchen-Hassel is a railway station on the Gelsenkirchen-Buer Nord–Marl Lippe railway in Gelsenkirchen in the German state of North Rhine-Westphalia. It is classified by Deutsche Bahn as a category 6 station. It was opened on 27 September 1968. It has a platform on the west side of the track. It can be reached via stairs and a ramp.

It is served by Rhine-Ruhr S-Bahn line S 9 at 60-minute intervals. Haltern am See, Marl, Gladbeck, Bottrop, Essen, Wuppertal

It is also served by bus route 243 (Buer + Bertlich – Westerholt – Herten, at 60-minute intervals) and taxibus service 240 (to Polsum at 60-minute intervals).
