= Marl Mitte station =

Railway station in Germany

Marl Mitte
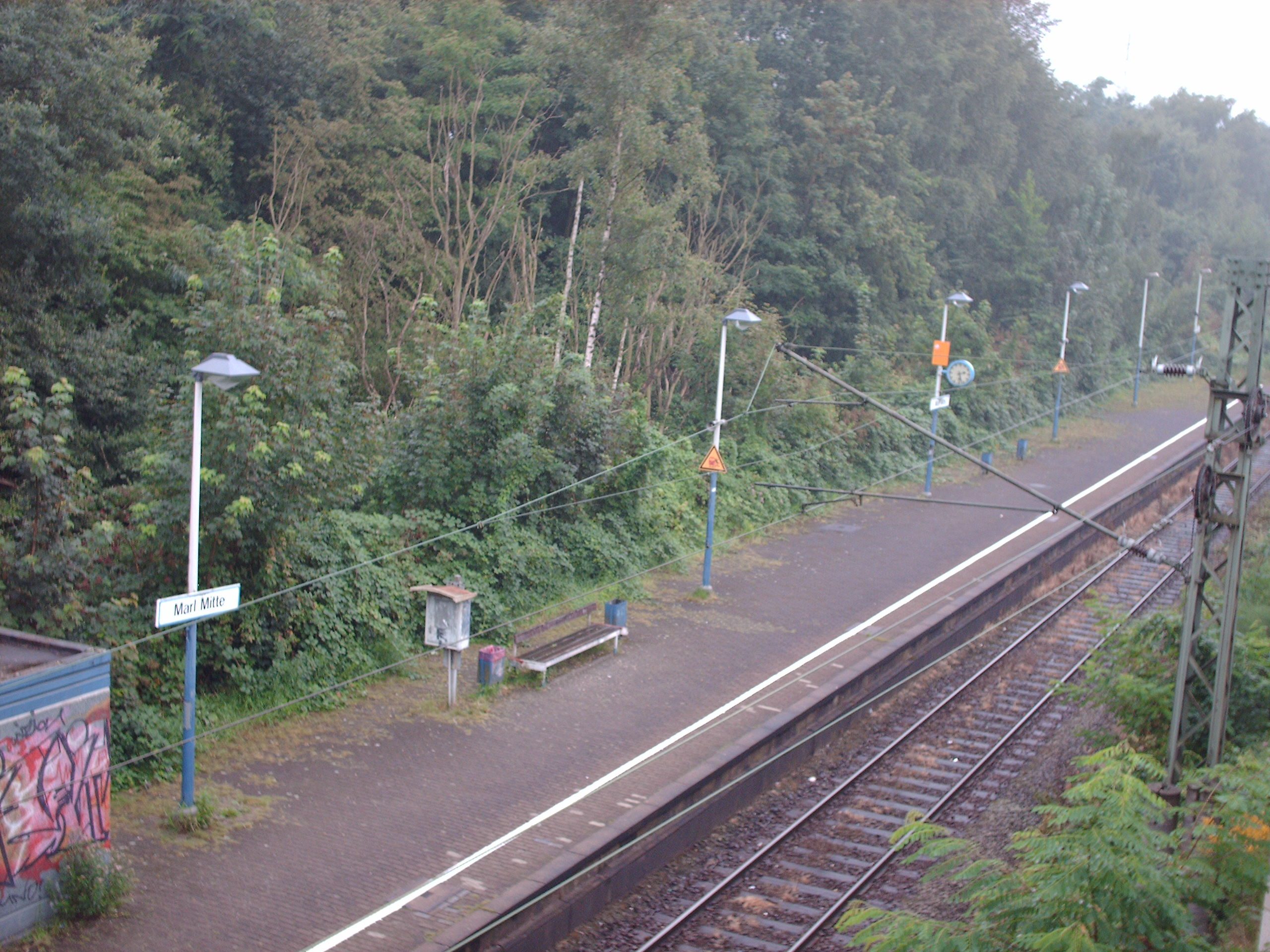

General information
- Location: Marsweg 9, Marl, NRW; Germany
- Coordinates: 51°39′15″N 7°06′02″E
- Line: GE-Buer Nord–Marl Lippe
- Platforms: 1

Construction
- Accessible: Yes

Other information
- Station code: 3981
- DS100 code: EMAM
- IBNR: 8003888
- Category: 6
- Fare zone: VRR: 150
- Website: www.bahnhof.de

History
- Opened: 24 October 1974

Services
Preceding station	Rhine-Ruhr S-Bahn	Following station
Marl-Hamm towards Haltern am See	S9	Gelsenkirchen-Hassel towards Hagen Hbf
Location

Marl Mitte is a railway station on the Gelsenkirchen-Buer Nord–Marl Lippe railway (a single-track electrified line built in 1968) in Marl in the German state of North Rhine-Westphalia. It is classified by Deutsche Bahn as a category 6 station and was opened on 24 October 1974.

The attached Marl Mitte (S) bus station is one of the central connecting points in the bus network of the Vestische Straßenbahnen. The Marler Stern shopping centre is also in the immediate vicinity of the halt. Access is via a pedestrian bridge with a lift connecting to the Marler Stern as well as via a level access to the east.

It is served by Rhine-Ruhr S-Bahn line S 9 at hourly intervals (Haltern am See - Marl-Hamm - Marl Mitte - Gelsenkirchen-Buer Nord - Gladbeck West - Bottrop -Essen Hbf - Velbert - Wuppertal) . It is also served by bus routes 221 (Brassert – Marl Mitte, at 60-minute intervals), 222 (Sinsen – Recklinghausen + Polsum – Hassel – Buer, at 30-minute intervals), 223 (Chemiepark – Sinsen – Wacholderstr, at 30-minute intervals), 225 (Hüls – Hamm – Waldsiedlung, at 30-minute intervals), 238 (Drewer Süd – Hüls Süd – Recklinghausen, at 30-minute intervals), 242 (Sickingmühle – Haltern/Mersch, at 30-minute intervals), 270 (RE Hbf + Brassert – Hervest – Dorsten, at 30-minute intervals), SB26 (Barkenberg – Wulfen + Sinsen – Oer-Erkenschwick, at 30- to 60-minute intervals) and SB27 (Langenbochum – Herten – Wanne-Eickel, at 30-minute intervals), SB25 (Dorsten + Recklinghausen, at 30-minute intervals) and taxibus service 229 (Hagenstr – Blumensiedlung at 60-minute intervals), all operated by Vestische Straßenbahnen.
