= Gelsenkirchen-Buer Nord station =

Railway station in Gelsenkirchen, Germany

Gelsenkirchen Buer Nord
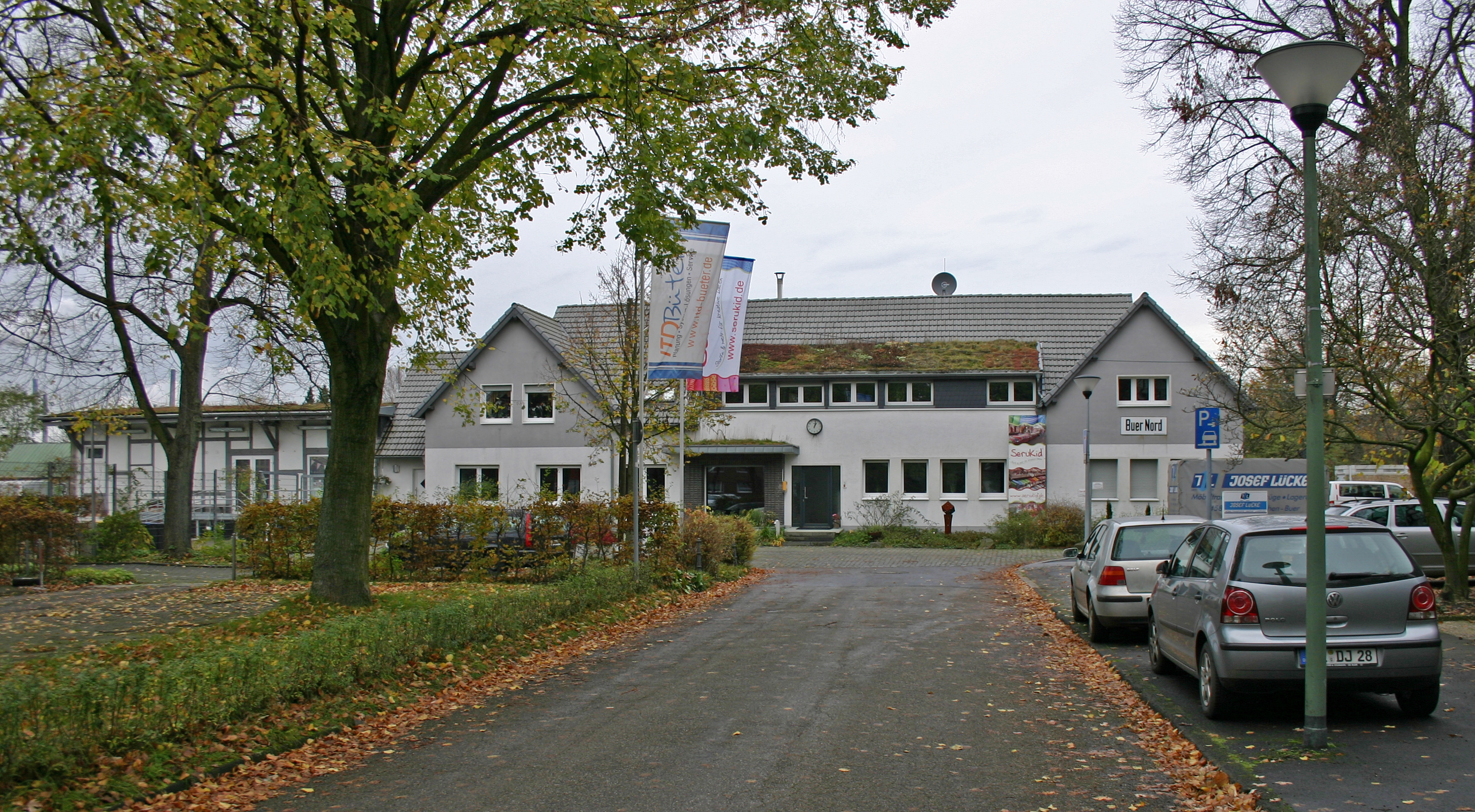
- Former station

General information
- Location: Königswiese 1, Gelsenkirchen, NRW; Germany
- Coordinates: 51°35′13″N 7°03′01″E
- Lines: Gelsenkirchen–Marl Lippe (KBS 450.9)
- Platforms: 1

Construction
- Accessible: Yes

Other information
- Station code: 2054
- DS100 code: EGBU
- IBNR: 8002224
- Category: 6
- Fare zone: VRR: 266
- Website: www.bahnhof.de

History
- Opened: 24 May 1998

Services
Preceding station	Rhine-Ruhr S-Bahn	Following station
Gelsenkirchen-Hassel towards Haltern am See	S9	Gladbeck West towards Hagen Hbf
Location

Gelsenkirchen-Buer Nord station is located in the city of Gelsenkirchen in the German state of North Rhine-Westphalia. It is on the Gelsenkirchen-Buer Nord–Marl Lippe railway. The current station was opened in 1998 and is classified by Deutsche Bahn as a category 6 station as a halt (Haltepunkt). It replaced a station 600 metres to the southwest, which had been opened in 1905.

== Location and construction ==
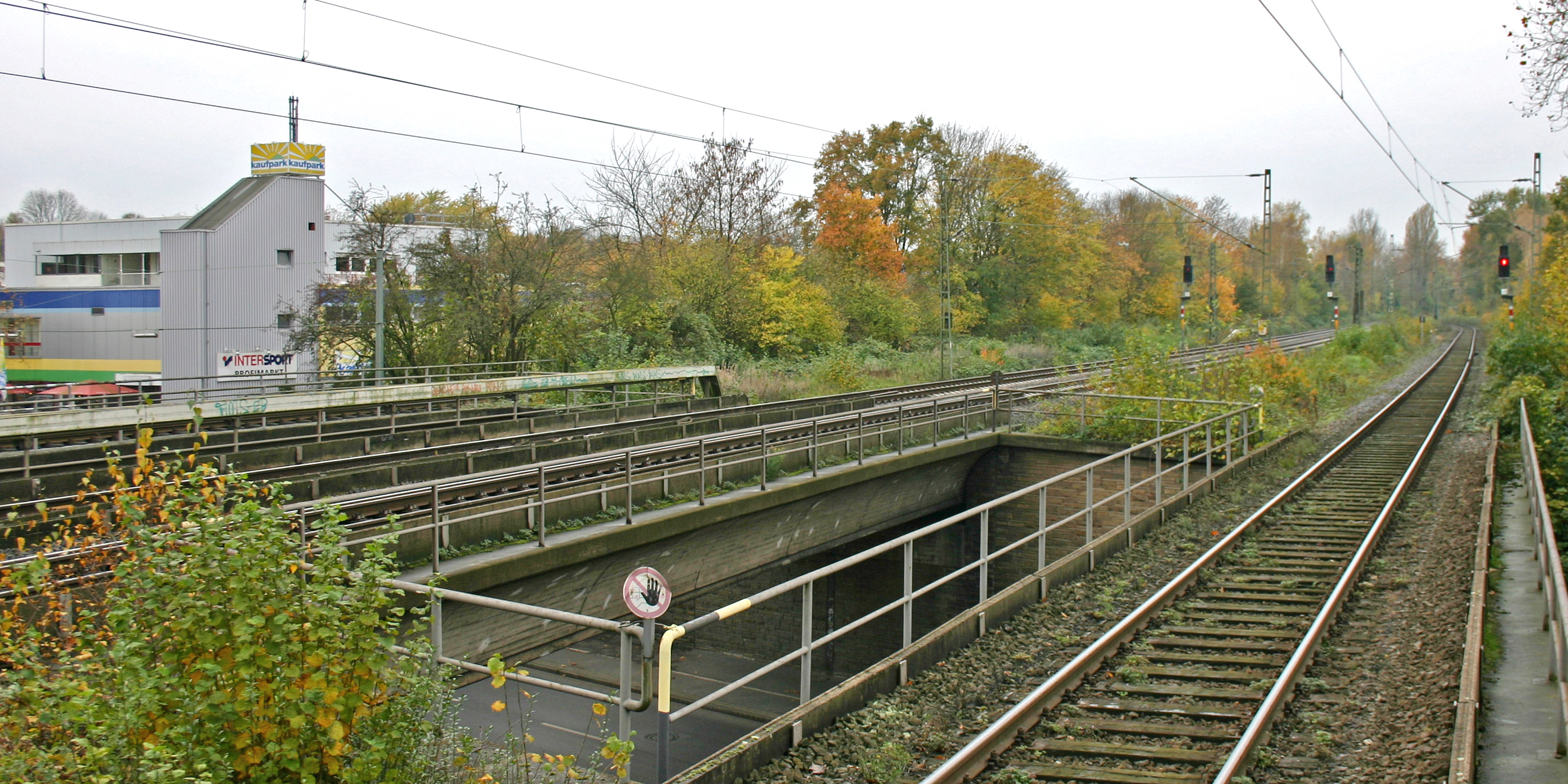
Overpass carrying the tracks over Königswiese, the infrastructure on the left was designed for a double-track line to Marl, 2014

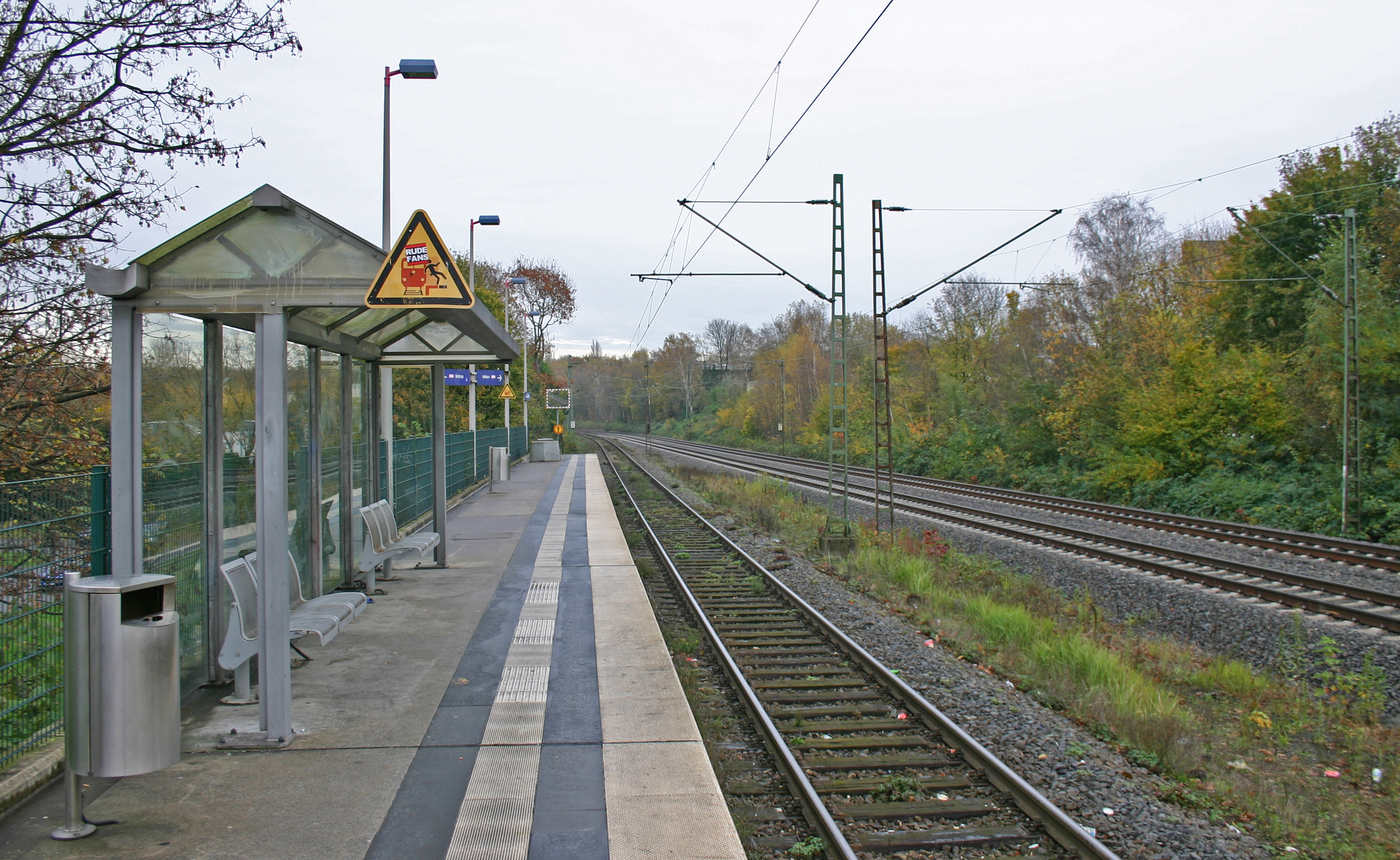
The current halt

The station is located north of Gelsenkirchen-Buer at kilometre 17.6 of the Hamm-Osterfeld railway. The line to Marl Lippe, popularly referred to as the V9, connects at the eastern end of the station. The old station has three main tracks, two of which are mainline tracks. The third track is leased as a siding. The station building is located south of the tracks with an exit to the street of Zum Alten Bahnhof ("to the old station"). It has been used by a fabric merchant since 2013.

West of the station, the V9 separates from the Hamm–Osterfeld railway. The S-Bahn halt is located on the V9 just behind entrance signal 48 G near the street of Königswiese. The tracks cross this street on a bridge and north of the station its name changes to Polsumer Straße. It is the direct road from Buer to the Hassel district, Polsum and Wulfen. The station has a simple side platform and can be reached via a stairway and by a lift. Part of the area between Königswiese/Polsumer Straße and the railway line is used for a commuter parking area.

The railway line to Marl is built as a single track in Buer, but the infrastructure is prepared for the installation of a second track. This would initially run east of the halt passing underneath the Hamm–Osterfeld railway, providing a grade-separated junction, and then run parallel to the current track to Marl. Provision has been made for the crossing of this fourth track over the Königswiese. The existing track base served for some time as the headshunt of the old Buer Nord station.

== History ==
Buer Nord station (called Gelsenkirchen-Buer Nord since 1949) was opened with the Hamm–Osterfeld railway on 1 May 1905. The line that branches here via Marl towards Haltern am See was opened on 27 September 1968. Deutsche Bundesbahn abandoned through passenger services towards Hamm at the change to the summer timetable in 1983. The remaining services on the Haltern–Marl–Buer route and continuing towards Gladbeck and Bottrop were maintained and were included in the network of the Rhine-Ruhr S-Bahn as line S9 on 24 May 1998. In order to facilitate better interchange with other public transport services, the passenger station was relocated to the street of Königswiese. The previous station remains as a rail yard.

== Services ==
The station is served by Rhine-Ruhr S-Bahn line S 9 (Haltern–Marl-Gladbeck-Bottrop-Essen-Wuppertal), operating every 60 minutes during the day.

It is also served by three bus routes operated by Vestische Straßenbahnen: 212, 222 and 244 at 30-minute intervals. It is also served by route SB28, operated by Busverkehr Rheinland at 30-minute intervals.

== Signal box ==
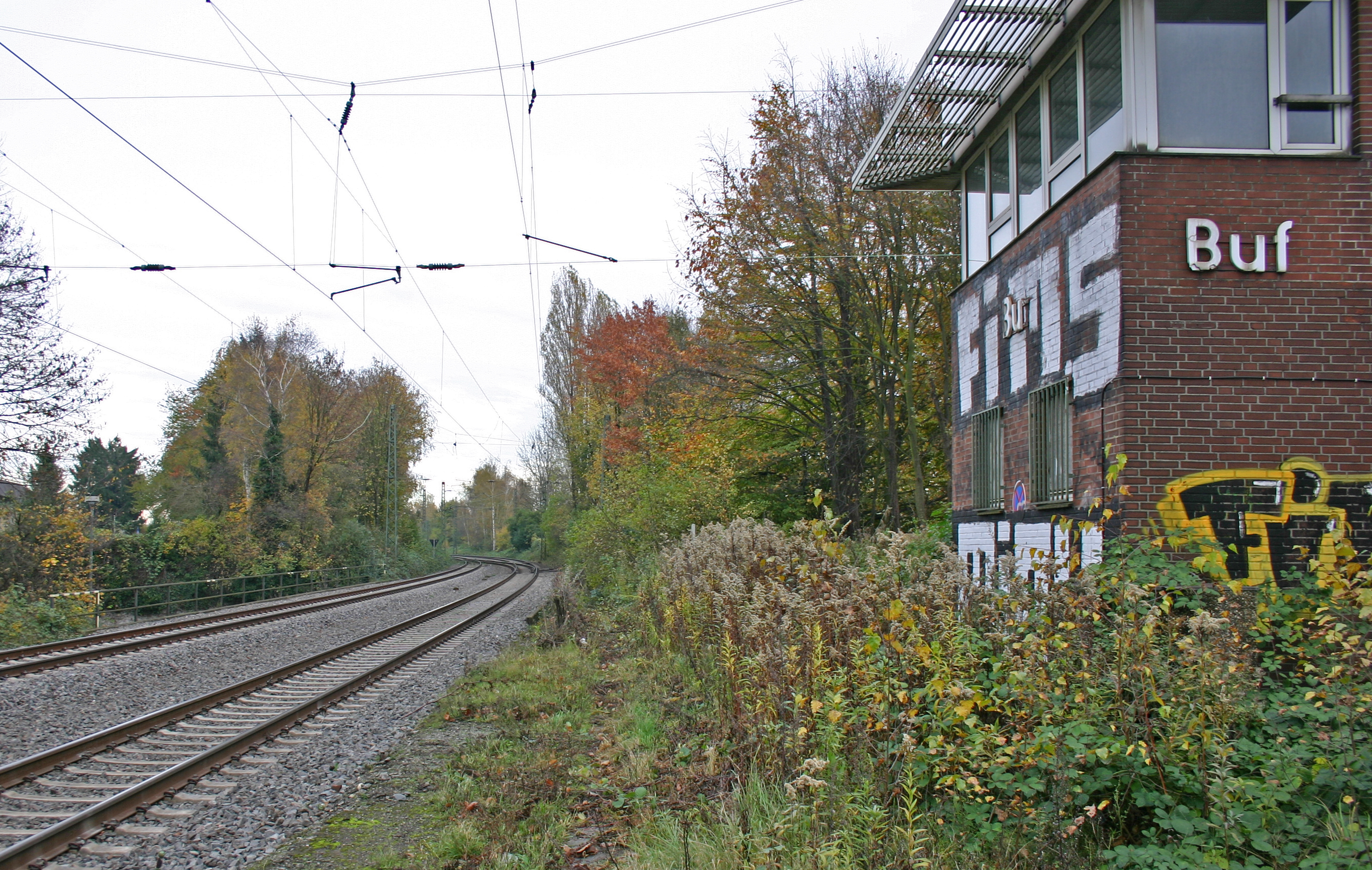
Former signal box "Buf" in 2007

Until 2012, the station had a relay interlocking of the SpDrL30 class built by Standard Elektrik Lorenz. Since 2007, the control and monitoring of turnouts and signals has been carried out by the "Of" signal box in Oberhausen-Osterfeld. In addition to the old signal box, an area computer was installed that controls not only the station but also the Marl CWH siding on the Gelsenkirchen-Buer Nord–Marl Lippe railway as well as the operating points of Gladbeck West and Westerholt, which are located on the adjacent Oberhausen-Osterfeld Süd–Hamm railway.
