= Marle =

Marle may refer to:

- Marle (Chrono Trigger), a character from the 1995 video game Chrono Trigger
- Marle, Aisne, a commune in France
- Marle, a hamlet in the Dutch municipality of Olst-Wijhe
- Marle, a hamlet in the Dutch municipality of Hellendoorn

== See also ==
- Marl (disambiguation)
