= Marl-Hamm station =

Railway station in Germany

Marl Hamm
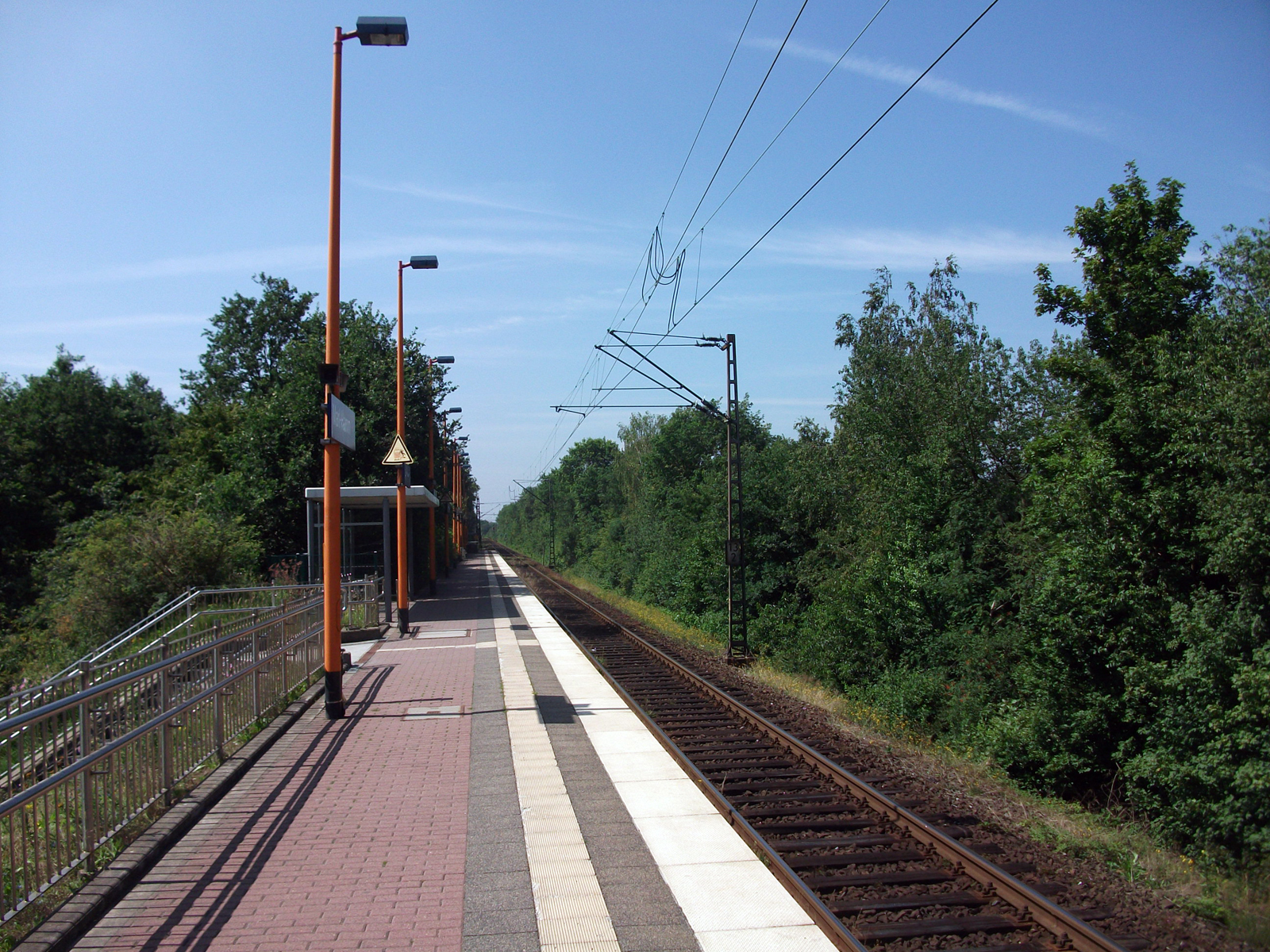

General information
- Location: Spechtstr. 2 a, Marl, NRW; Germany
- Coordinates: 51°40′57″N 7°07′52″E
- Owner: DB Netz
- Operator: DB Station&Service
- Line: GE-Buer Nord–Marl Lippe
- Platforms: 1

Construction
- Accessible: Yes

Other information
- Station code: 3983
- DS100 code: EMHM
- IBNR: 8003890
- Category: 6
- Fare zone: VRR: 156
- Website: www.bahnhof.de

History
- Opened: 27 September 1968

Services
Preceding station	Rhine-Ruhr S-Bahn	Following station
Haltern am See Terminus	S9	Marl Mitte towards Hagen Hbf
Location

Marl-Hamm station is a railway station on the Gelsenkirchen-Buer Nord–Marl Lippe railway in Marl in the German state of North Rhine-Westphalia. It is classified by Deutsche Bahn as a category 6 station and was opened on 27 September 1968. It is located in the north of the city on an embankment. A section of the A 52 runs parallel to the line. It has a side platform and can be reached by stairs and lifts.

It is served by Rhine-Ruhr S-Bahn line S 9 at hourly intervals. Route: Haltern am See - Marl - Gladbeck - Bottrop - Essen - Wuppertal.

It is also served by bus route 225 (Hüls – Marl + Waldsiedlung, at 30-minute intervals) operated by Vestische Straßenbahnen.
