= Haltern–Venlo railway =

Railway line in Germany and the Netherlands

Hamburg-Venlo Railway
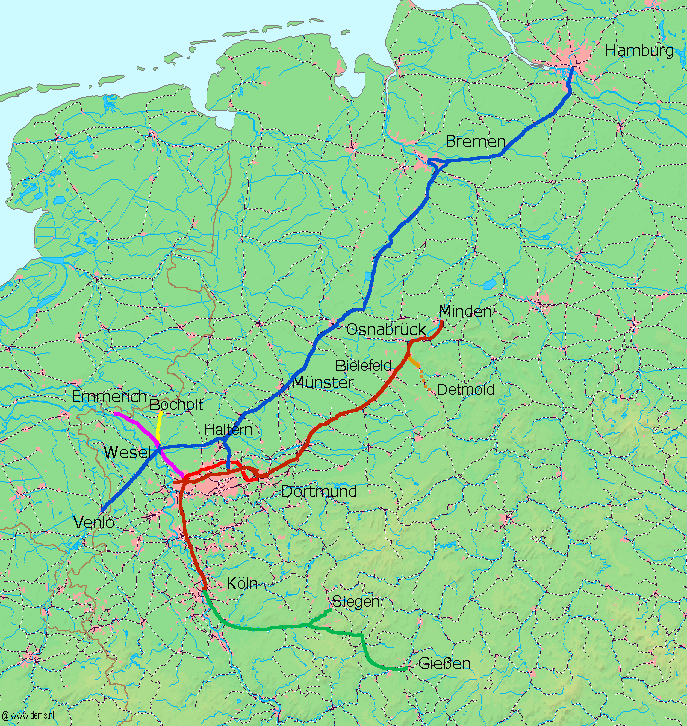
- Hamburg-Venlo Railway in blue

Overview
- Line number: 2002 (Haltern–Büderich); 2003 (Büderich–border)
- Locale: North Rhine-Westphalia, Germany and the Netherlands
- Termini: Haltern am See; Venlo

Service
- Route number: ex 224b/242e

Technical
- Line length: 90.2 km (56.0 mi)
- Track gauge: 1,435 mm (4 ft 8 1/2 in) standard gauge
- Operating speed: 50 km/h (31.1 mph) (maximum)

The Haltern–Venlo railway is a now largely disused and dismantled line in the German state of North Rhine-Westphalia and the Netherlands.

It was opened in 1874 by the Cologne-Minden Railway Company (German: Cöln-Mindener Eisenbahn-Gesellschaft, CME) as part of the Hamburg-Venlo railway from Venlo in the Netherlands to a junction at Haltern am See on the Wanne-Eickel–Hamburg railway, which had been opened by the CME from Wanne to Munster in 1870. In contrast to the eastern section of the line, the Haltern-Venlo section ran at a loss from the beginning.

== History ==
After the development in France of a scheme for a transcontinental railway connection between Hamburg and Paris (the so-called "Paris–Hamburg Railway") and continuing to Scandinavia, the Prussian government insisted that the section on German territory would be built by a German railway company and the western terminus of the German line would be in the Dutch town of Venlo. As a result, the line became known as the Hamburg–Venlo railway.

The Cologne-Minden Railway Company was awarded the contract for the line and began construction of the eastern section from its Wanne station on its original trunk line to Hamburg, which continues to have great importance for long-distance and regional passenger and freight traffic as the Wanne-Eickel–Hamburg railway.

Since Prussia required the line to bypass the important strategic and economic industrial area of the Ruhr to the north, the western part of the line was built from Venlo to Haltern, crossing the Rhine at Wesel and running from Wesel to Haltern along the Lippe river. Even then it was expected that these parts of the line would not operate profitably.

The construction of the bridge over the Rhine at Wesel did not begin until the much-needed and lucrative Elbe Bridge was completed between Harburg and Hamburg. The rest of the line offered no technical problems. Thus, despite the late start of construction, the Haltern–Wesel section was completed on 1 March 1874; the Wesel-Venlo section was completed three months later on 31 December 1874. On 1 June 1873 the Hamburg–Haltern line was completed with the opening of the Bremen-Hamburg section.

Use as a route for long-distance passenger traffic was brief. With the connection of the Boxtel Railway to the bridge over the Rhine at Wesel before the First World War, a long-distance connection was established on the (London–) Vlissingen–Wesel–Osnabrück–Berlin–Eydtkuhnen (now Chernyshevskoye)–Saint Petersburg route. This service was no longer necessary after the First World War due to the lack of passengers as a result of hyperinflation and the dislocation to operations caused by the occupation of the Ruhr.

Also the line had little significance for local transport, since it bypassed the Ruhr area and there was almost no demand for travel in the directions that it ran.

Ironically, the Wesel–Haltern section was later especially important as an access route to new coal mines when mining was extended to the north of the Ruhr.

== Closure ==
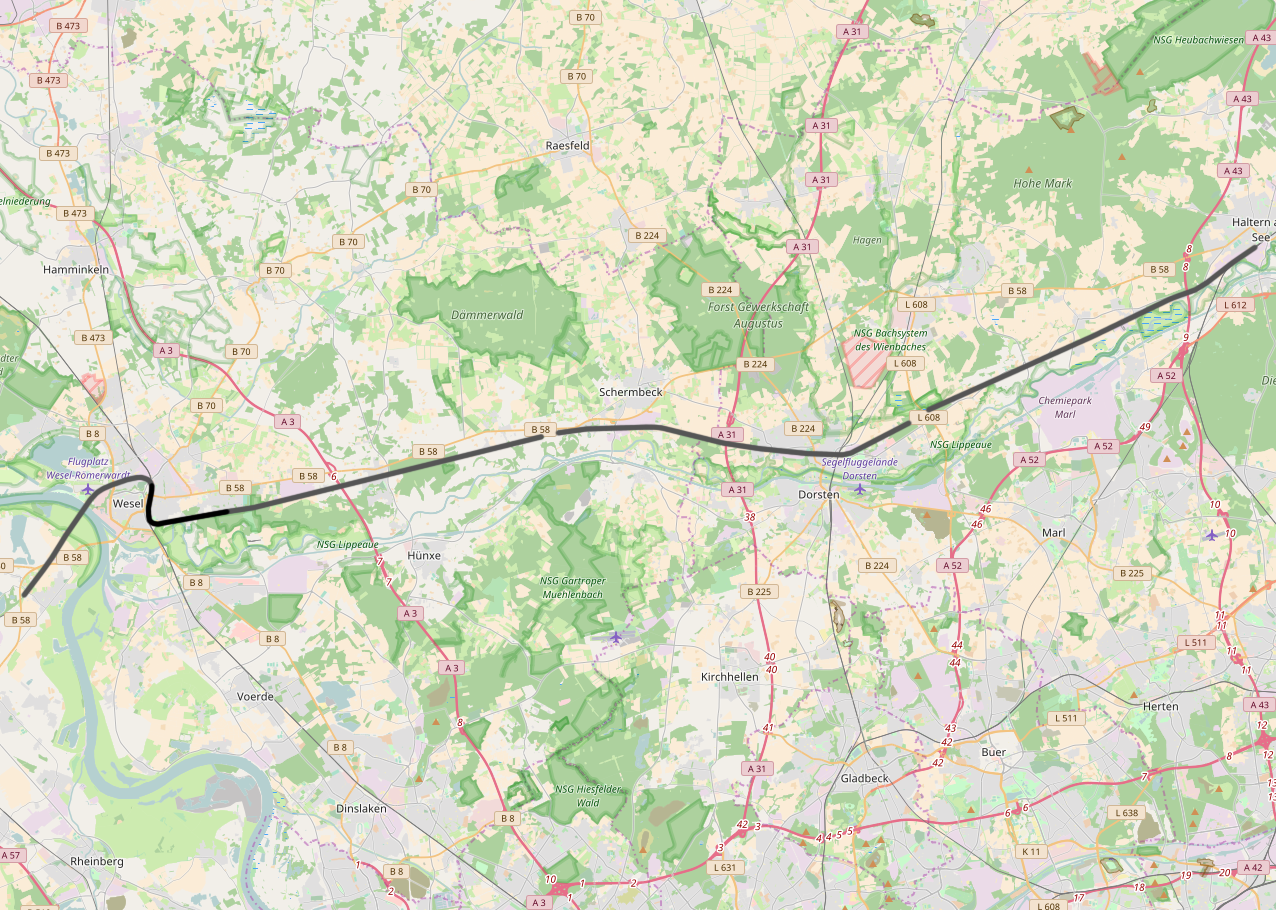
Haltern-Rhine section

In 1936, at the instigation of the Maatschappij tot Exploitatie van Staatsspoorwegen (Company for the Exploitation of the State Railways, the operator of the section of the line in the Netherlands), the section between Venlo, Straelen and Geldern Ost was closed, abandoning international traffic for the first time.

During the Second World War the line was put back into service at the behest of the German military and served to supply the Western Front. When Allied troops invaded, the Wesel railway bridge was blown up on 10 March 1945 by German military engineers.

After the war, services were resumed with the help of a temporary bridge, but on 29 May 1960, the last passenger train ran between Geldern and Wesel. Two years later, passenger services were also closed between Haltern and Wesel.

Freight traffic was closed in several steps. First, on 30 September 1962, it was closed between Schermbeck and Drevenack, then, on 1 August 1963, it was closed between Menzelen West and Bönninghardt and, on 28 February 1967, it was closed between Bönninghardt and Straelen. On 26 May 1974, this was followed by the closure of the section between Drevenack and Wesel, on 1 October 1985, the closure of the section between Hervest-Dorsten and Schermbeck and finally, on 29 May 1988, the closure between Haltern and Hervest-Dorsten.

Between 1975 and 1992, the closed line was gradually dismantled.

== Current situation ==
The remaining track between the 9.1 and 16.0 km mark is now used only as a siding by the RWE company to its Kusenhorst substation. The track between the 32.7 and 41.1 km mark is mainly used by the RWE company.

The section of the line between Büderich and Menzelen West Tief West of the Rhine became part of line 2517 in 2003 and now serves as a rail connection between the ESCO salt mine in Borth and the Lower Rhine Railway.
