= Marl Hill =

Historic house in Virginia, United States

- U.S. National Register of Historic Places
- Virginia Landmarks Register
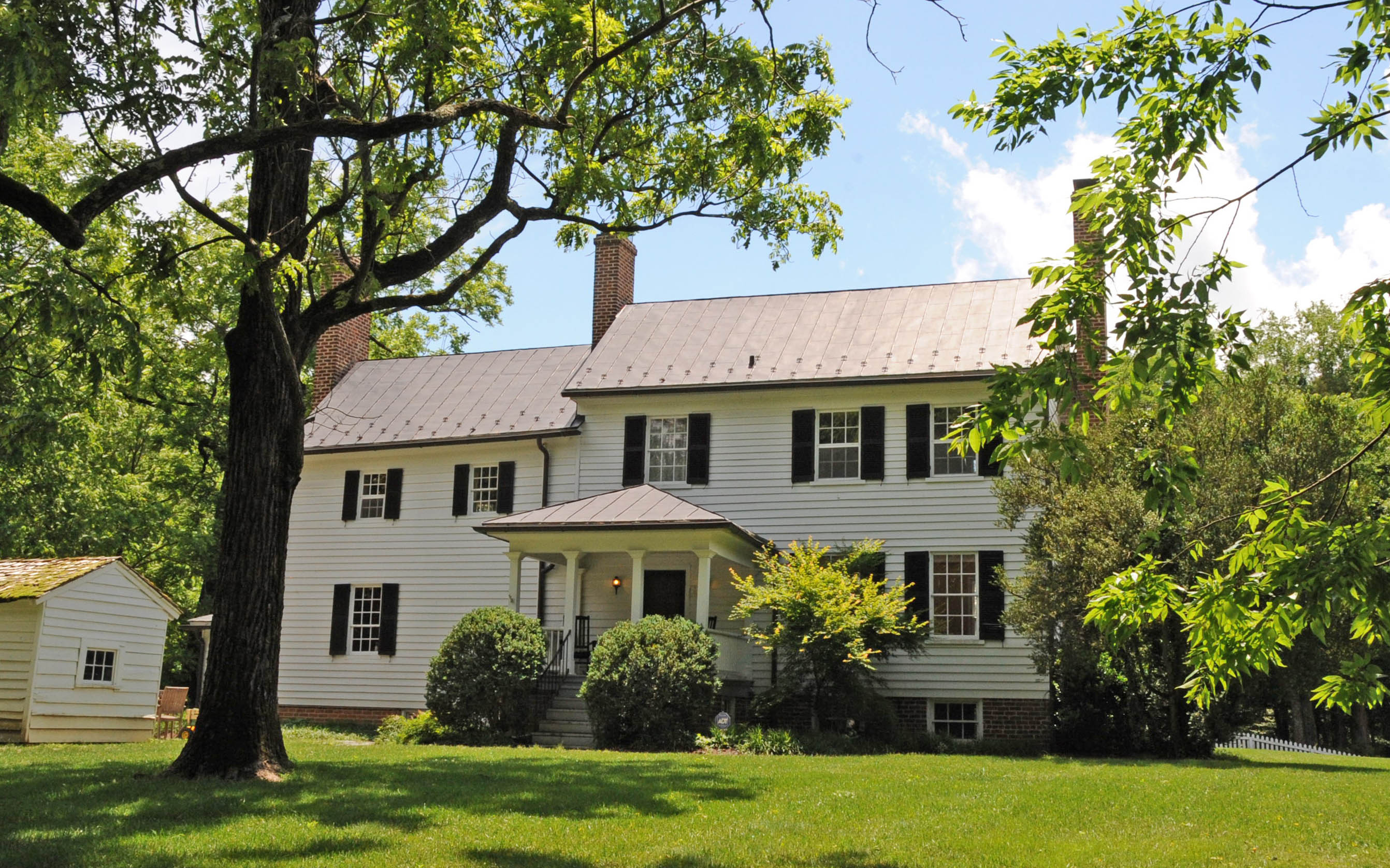
- Location: New Kent, Virginia
- Area: 40.5 acres (16.4 ha)
- Built: 1825
- Architectural style: Greek Revival, Federal
- NRHP reference No.: 90001832
- VLR No.: 063-0019

Significant dates
- Added to NRHP: December 21, 1990
- Designated VLR: December 12, 1989

Marl Hill is a historic home located near Talleysville, New Kent County, Virginia. The original section dates to the late-18th century, with the larger west addition built about 1825. It is a two-story, five-bay, wood frame dwelling with Federal and Greek Revival style architectural features. Also on the property are the contributing shed, woodshed, smokehouse, pumphouse, rootcellar, a historic well and boxwoods. The property was once the site of a marl mining operation.

It was listed on the National Register of Historic Places in 1990.
