= Gelsenkirchen-Buer Nord–Marl Lippe railway =

Railway line in Germany

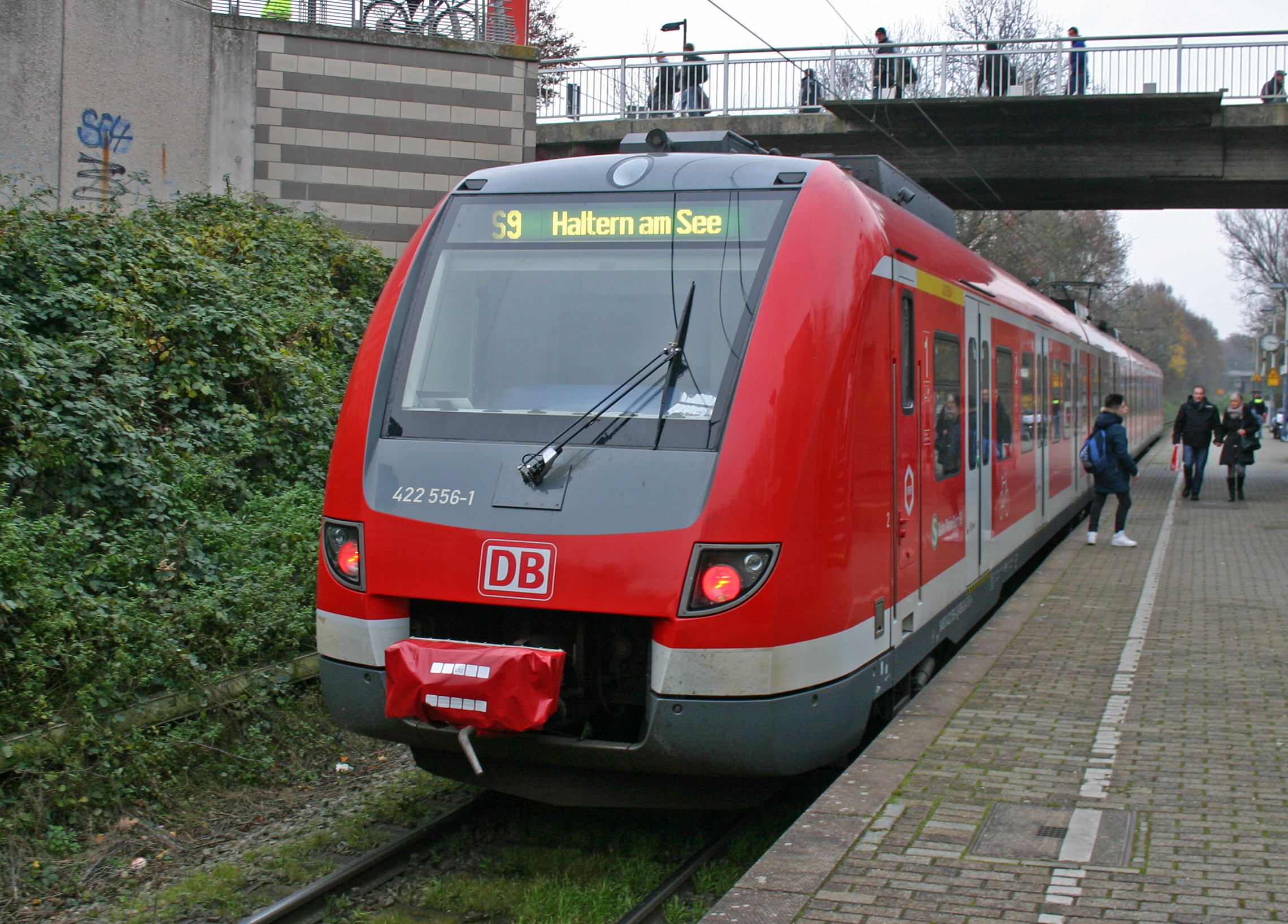
- 422 056 of the S9 service to Haltern am See in Marl Mitte, 2014

Overview
- Line number: 2252
- Locale: North Rhine-Westphalia, Germany

Service
- Route number: 450.9

Technical
- Line length: 16.9 km (10.5 mi)
- Number of tracks: 2 (Marl Lippe junction only)
- Track gauge: 1,435 mm (4 ft 8 1/2 in) standard gauge
- Electrification: 15 kV/16.7 Hz AC overhead catenary
- Operating speed: 120 km/h (75 mph)

The Gelsenkirchen-Buer Nord–Marl Lippe railway is an approximately 17 kilometre-long, electrified and predominantly single-track main line railway in the north of the Ruhr district of the German state of North Rhine-Westphalia. It connects Gelsenkirchen-Buer Nord station on the Oberhausen-Osterfeld Süd–Hamm railway (Oberhausen-Osterfeld – Hamm (Westf) marshalling yard) with Marl Lippe junction on the Wanne-Eickel–Hamburg railway (Wanne-Eickel Hbf – Hamburg Hbf). The route is included in the list lines showing local speeds under the VzG route number of 2252. As the railway was planned by the Ruhr coal district association as traffic axis (Verkehrsband) No. 9, it is also colloquially called V9.

== History ==
The Essener Volkszeitung newspaper published an article on 14 April 1903 addressing the need for a railway from Essen to open up the coalfields north of the city. The article was well received by both the city and the Königliche Eisenbahndirektion (Royal Railway division, KED, later Reichsbahndirektion) of Essen. Under the first plans, the new connection would run from Essen Hauptbahnhof via Stoppenberg and Altenessen to the railway of the Nordstern colliery and from there via Horst, Buer and Marl to Haltern. Three different routes were debated for the middle section. The western options ran through Gladbeck, the middle via Buer and the eastern via Erle and Middelich. The latter variant was demanded by the city of Buer, but rejected by the city of Gladbeck from the outset. The planning committee finally settled on the middle option until May 1904 and submitted the proposal to the Prussian Ministry of Public Works.

The Ministry rejected the proposal in a letter of 2 January 1905, referring to the Hamm–Osterfeld railway, then under construction, and the fact that its effects on traffic were awaited. For the southern section, the Ministry also proposed the construction of connecting curves from the Winterswijk–Gelsenkirchen-Bismarck railway to Schalke Nord station or from Bottrop to the Mülheim-Heißen/Essen West – Oberhausen-Osterfeld Nord railway. Thus, existing north–south lines could be used. A proposal submitted by the city of Gelsenkirchen in late 1903 with a routing from Gelsenkirchen Hauptbahnhof via Schalke Süd, Schalke Nord and east of Buer was also declined by the ministry in mid-1905, citing the Hamm-Osterfeld railway.

Under the leadership of the Buer mayor August de la Chevallerie, the cities of Buer, Essen and Gelsenkirchen then joined forces to work out a joint proposal. After a first submission in 1908 again met with rejection, the joint commission developed a package solution with three routes. Along with the undisputed Buer – Marl – Haltern northern section, the project envisaged a line from Gelsenkirchener Hauptbahnhof via the stations of Gelsenkirchen-Bismarck and Westerholt to Marl and an electric rapid transit system running directly from Gelsenkirchen via Schalke to Buer. Since this proposal was not pursued further, the city of Gelsenkirchen left the commission in 1911. The KED Essen used an opportunity to carry out preparatory work in the area of the connecting curve in Schalke proposed by the Ministry. Shortly thereafter, the ministry instructed the KED to also carry out preparatory work for the section from Buer Süd to Haltern.

A law adopted in 1914 approving a loan for the railway set out the basic information on it and the course described largely corresponded with the route proposed by the city of Essen in its 1903 plan. Deviating from this was the intended connecting curve between the stations of Buer Süd and Buer Nord, which went far to the west and branched off from the Winterswijk – Gelsenkirchen-Bismarck line just before Gladbeck Ost station. The city of Gladbeck therefore demanded a relocation of the route to pass through Gladbeck Ost station, referring to its importance—Gladbeck Ost was at this time the second largest passenger station in the Münster region in terms of passenger numbers. The KED then moved the curve a little west, but still branching off before Gladbeck Ost station. Since the city seemed dissatisfied by this proposal, the route was relocated to the east outside the municipality following the end of the First World War, so that the city would not affect the approval process. It led to further route proposals by the city of Gladbeck and, among other things, the city administration sought a report from the traffic scientist Erich Giese, who proposed a complete reconstruction of the Gladbeck railway infrastructure without success.

Deutsche Reichsbahn restarted work on the project in 1927 as part of the Ruhr development program of the Ruhr coal district association (Siedlungsverband Ruhrkohlenbezirk, SVR) and again used the routes set out the railway bond act of 1914. In addition, Deutsche Reichsbahn planned connecting curves from Horst to Gelsenkirchen Hauptbahnhof and continuing to Bochum Präsident station. Within the development program, the route received the designation of Verkehrsband Nr. 9 (traffic axis no. 9); the abbreviation of "V9" was soon used as an alternative name for the route. This was followed by preliminary work in the Gelsenkirchen Hbf area and the first preliminary measures were carried out in the Essen city area from 1937. The Second World War eventually prevented the implementation of the project.

Deutsche Bundesbahn resumed preparatory work on Verkehrsband 9 in 1957. The work was now limited to the northern section from Gelsenkirchen-Buer Nord via Marl to Haltern, a continuation to the south was now no longer provided and services would run on the existing routes via Bottrop Hbf. Extensive work was required for the construction, as the route crosses other traffic routes at a grade-separated junction at Lippe. After an eleven-year construction period, the connection was opened on 27 September 1968. The stations of Gelsenkirchen-Hassel, Marl-Drewer and Marl-Hamm were also opened that day.

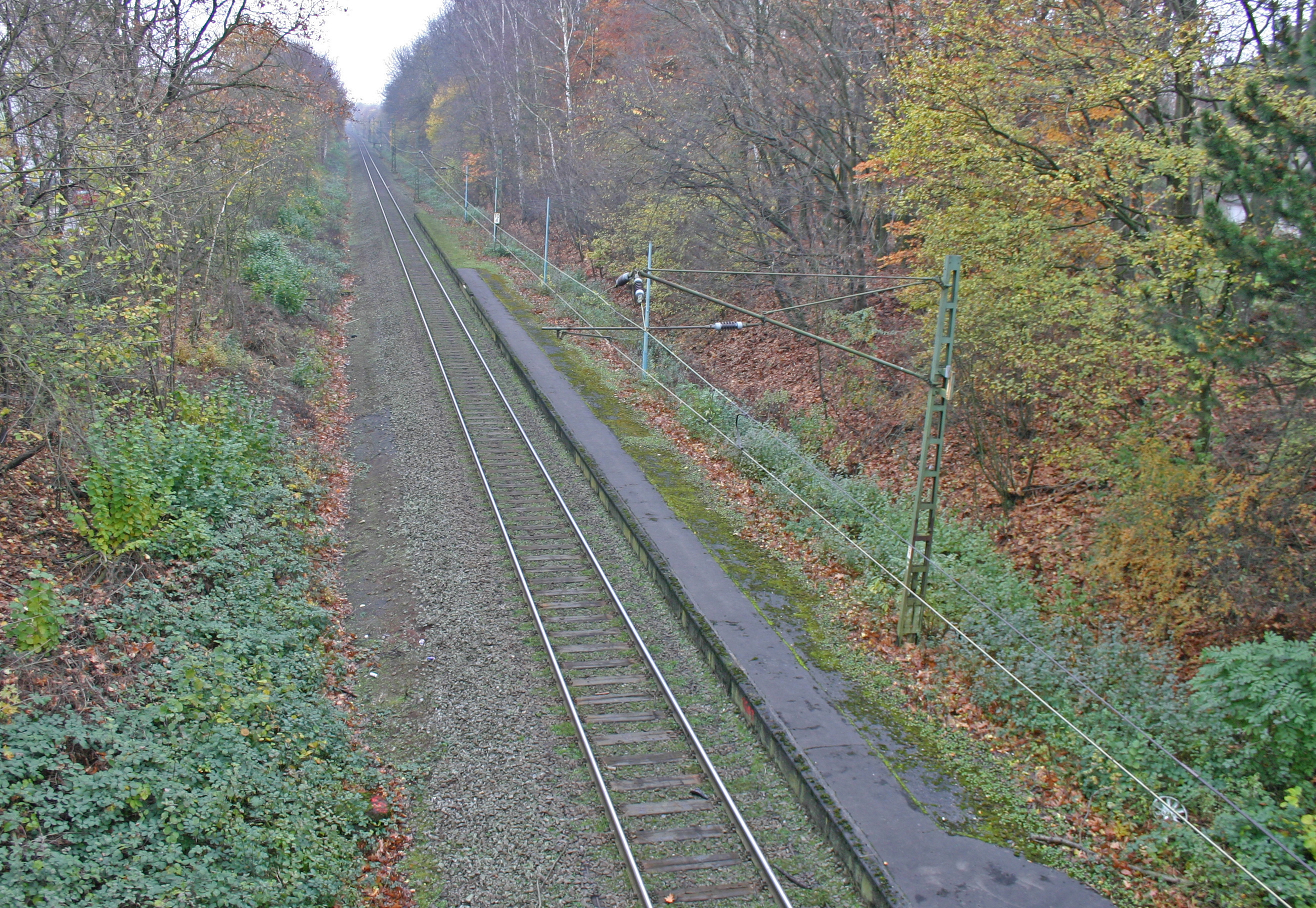
The halt of Marl-Drewer, which was closed in 1998, in 2014

In 1971 a junction was built for a siding to the Chemischen Werke Hüls, today Marl Chemical Park, located north of Marl-Drewer. Three years later, on 24 October 1974, the halt of Marl Mitte was opened. The halt, together with the Marler Stern shopping centre, which opened at the same time, forms the centre of Marl. In response to the ambitions of the city, the station received a comparatively large development and several pre-construction works were carried out for a planned second track.

The line became part of the network of the Rhine-Ruhr S-Bahn on 24 May 1998. In preparation, necessary adjustments were made to the railway infrastructure. Passenger services at Gelsenkirchen-Buer Nord station were abandoned and a new halt (Gelsenkirchen-Buer Nord Hp) was built above the street of Königswiese. This provides better interchanges with local bus routes. The old station itself continues to exist as a depot. New platforms with a height of 96 centimetres were also installed in Gelsenkirchen-Hassel and Marl-Hamm. The platforms in Marl Mitte remained untouched by the works and the halt of Marl-Drewer was abandoned with the conversion to S-Bahn operations because it was too close to Marl Mitte.

== Route description ==
=== Course and operating points ===
The line starts at Gelsenkirchen-Buer Nord station on the Hamm-Osterfeld railway. The station, opened in 1905, served until 1992 as a goods yard and until 1998 as a passenger station. The line turns diverts from VzG line 2250 immediately after the entrance building. The halt (Haltepunkt) at Gelsenkirchen-Buer Nord is located on the overpass over Königswiese. It provides a better connection to the local bus routes and was built in 1998 as a replacement for the former station.

The line initially runs parallel to the Hamm-Osterfeld railway and swings to the north after about two kilometres. At Kilometre 3.9, it reaches the halt of Gelsenkirchen-Hassel. It has a platform on the west side of the track. It can be reached via stairs and a ramp.

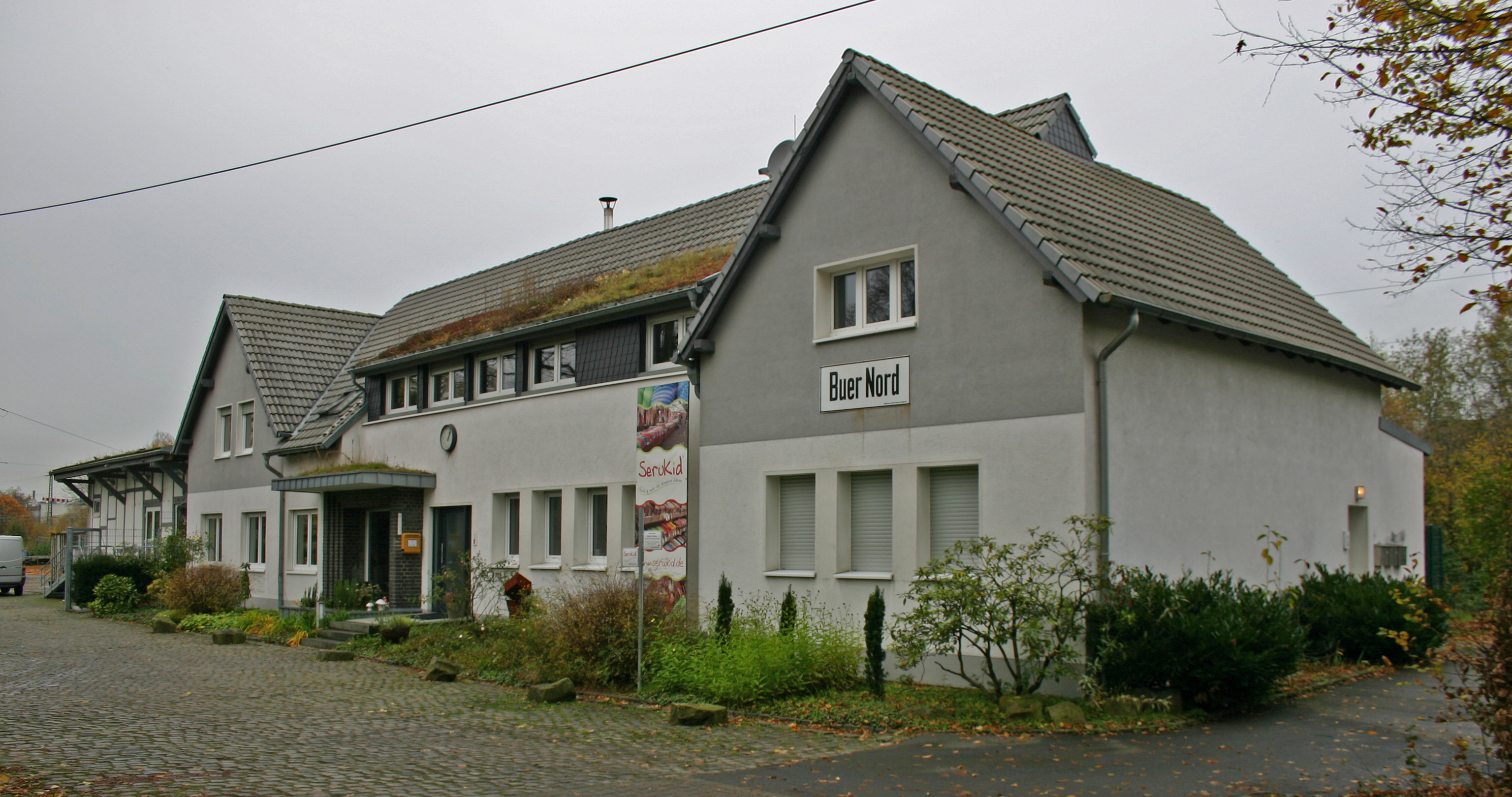
Gelsenkirchen-Buer Nord,
2014

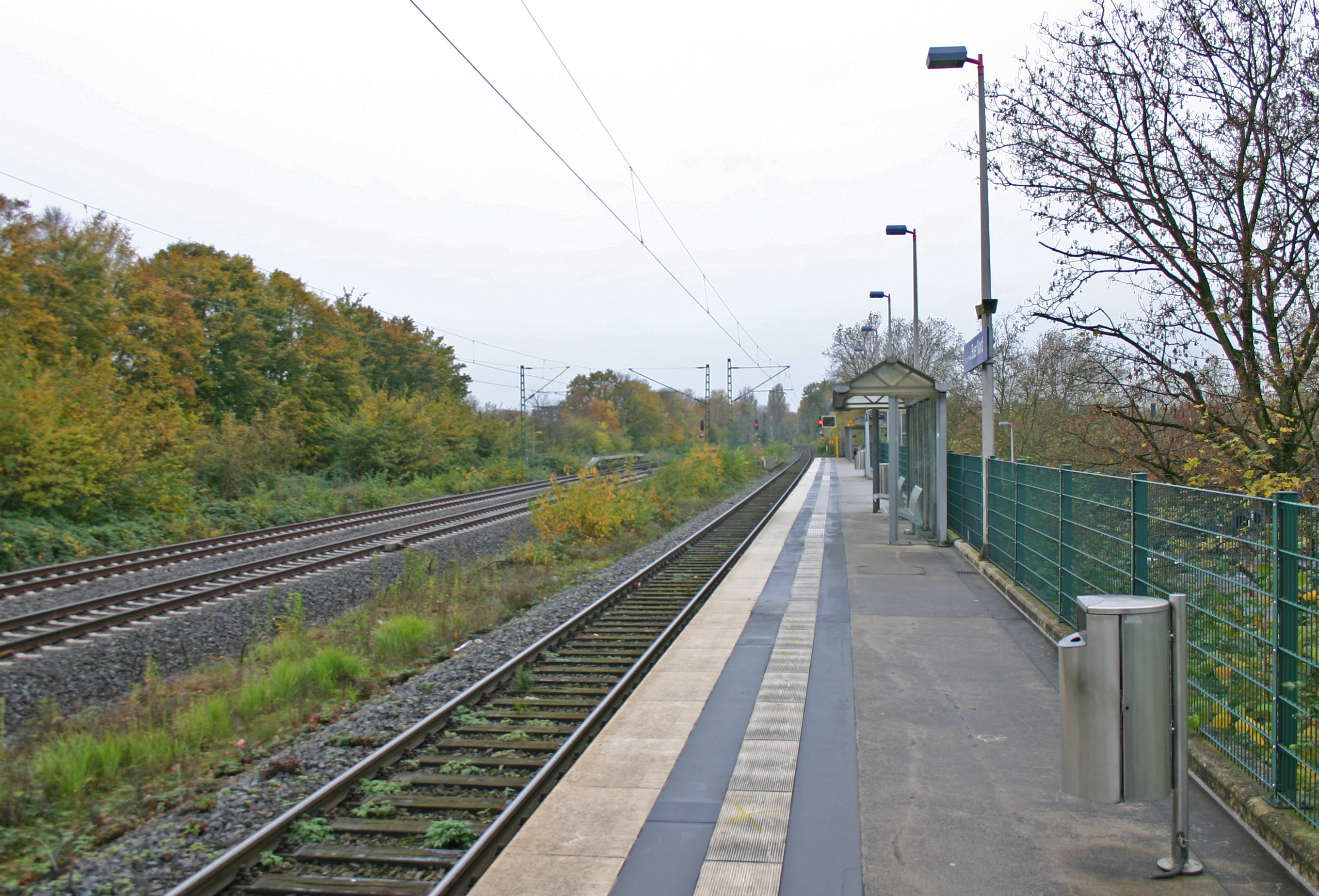
Gelsenkirchen-Buer Nord Hp,
2014

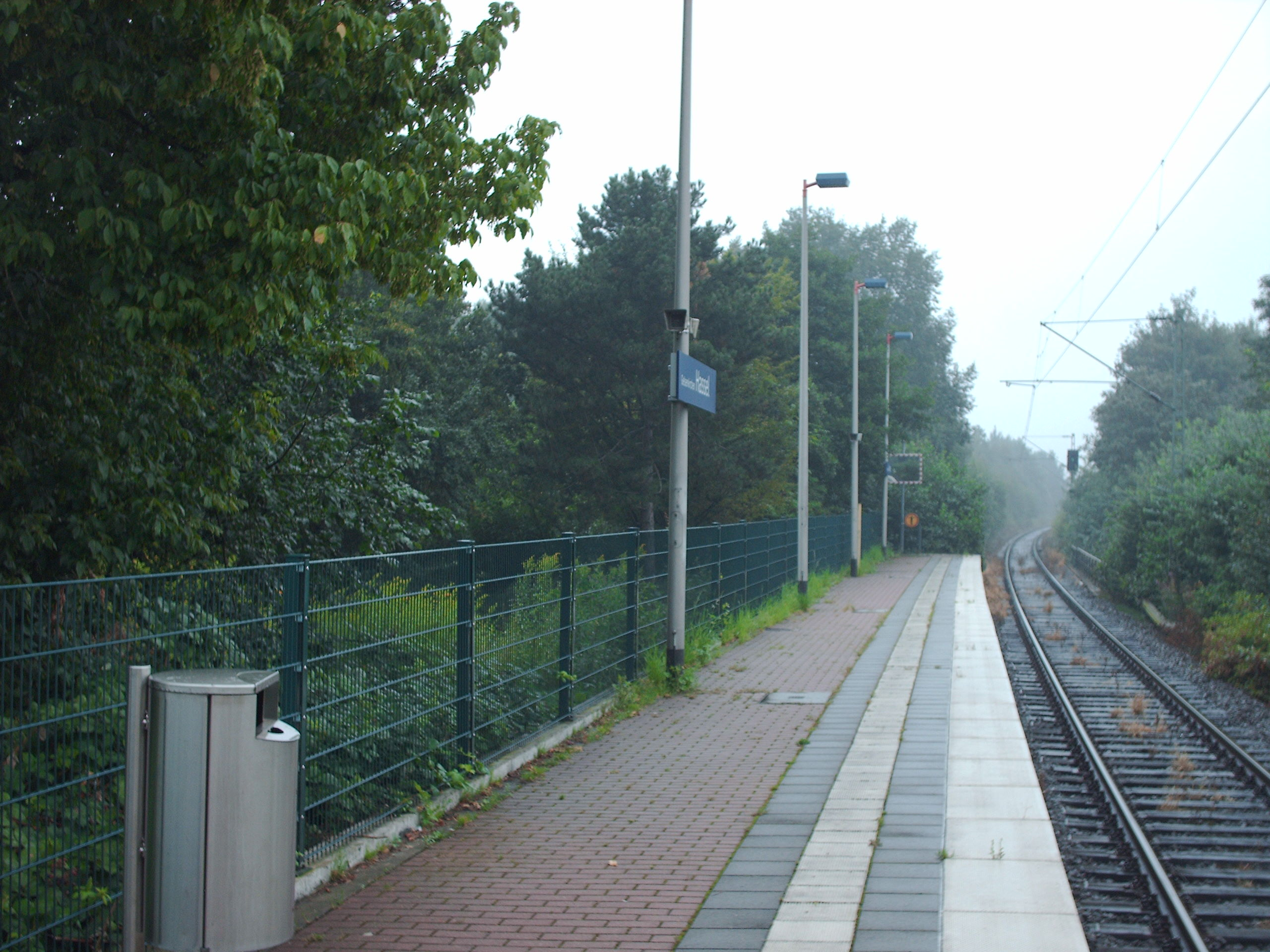
Gelsenkirchen-Hassel,
2007

Upon reaching the Marl urban area, the line runs in a cutting. This barrier also forms part of the boundaries of several districts of Marl. The halt of Marl Mitte is located at kilometre 6.3. The attached Marl Mitte (S) bus station is one of the central connecting points in the bus network of the Vestische Straßenbahnen. The Marler Stern shopping centre is also in the immediate vicinity of the halt. Access is via a pedestrian bridge with a lift connecting to the Marler Stern as well as via a level access to the east.

One kilometre past Marl Mitte was the former halt of Marl-Drewer. The station was abandoned with the conversion of the line to S-Bahn operations due to the short distance between the stations. The halt had a platform on the eastern side of the line.

The line climbs after Marl-Drewer. The junction of Marl CWH siding is located at kilometre 11.3. Until 2003, the operating point was classified as a railway junction. The junction connects the railway of RBH Logistics (now a subsidiary of DB Cargo) to Chemiepark Marl (formerly Chemische Werke Hüls, abbreviated CHW). There is an alternative connection to the chemical park from Marl-Sinsen station on the Wanne-Eickel–Hamburg railway. This connection crosses the line over a bridge directly after the Marl CWH siding.

The halt of Marl-Hamm is located in the north of the city on an embankment. A section of the A 52 runs parallel to the line. The halt has a side platform and can be reached by stairs and lifts.

Marl Lippe junction starts at kilometre 14.7. The track splits behind block signal 91 911 into two tracks. The regular track passes under the Wanne-Eickel–Hamburg line providing a grade-separated connection. After the connection of the lines, but still within the formal precincts of the junction, the line crosses the Marler Straße level crossing. In the immediate vicinity of the junction is the Autobahnkreuz Marl-Nord (interchange) of the A 43, A 52 and L 612. The A 43 and the L 612 cross the line in the area of Marl Lippe junction.

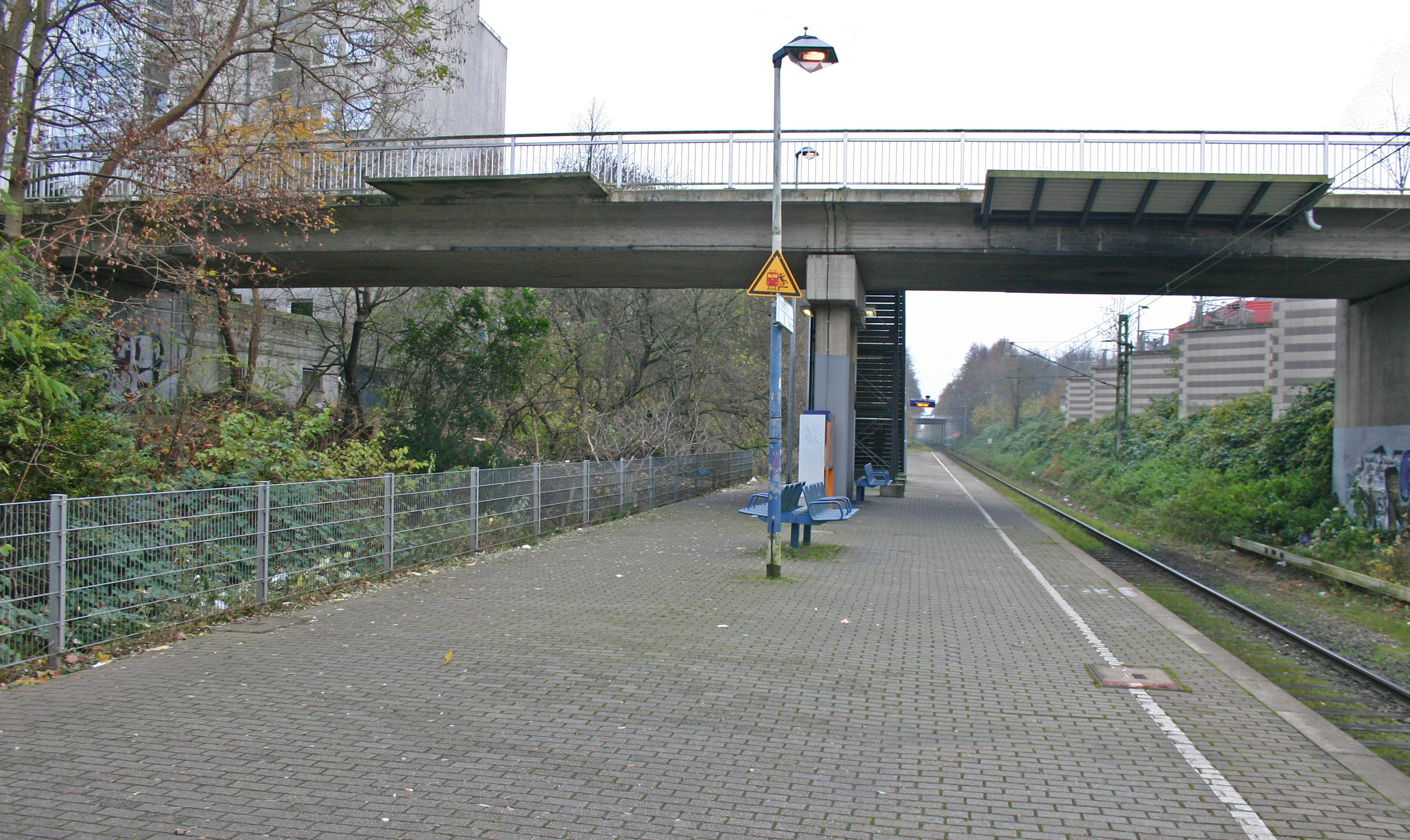
Marl Mitte,
2014

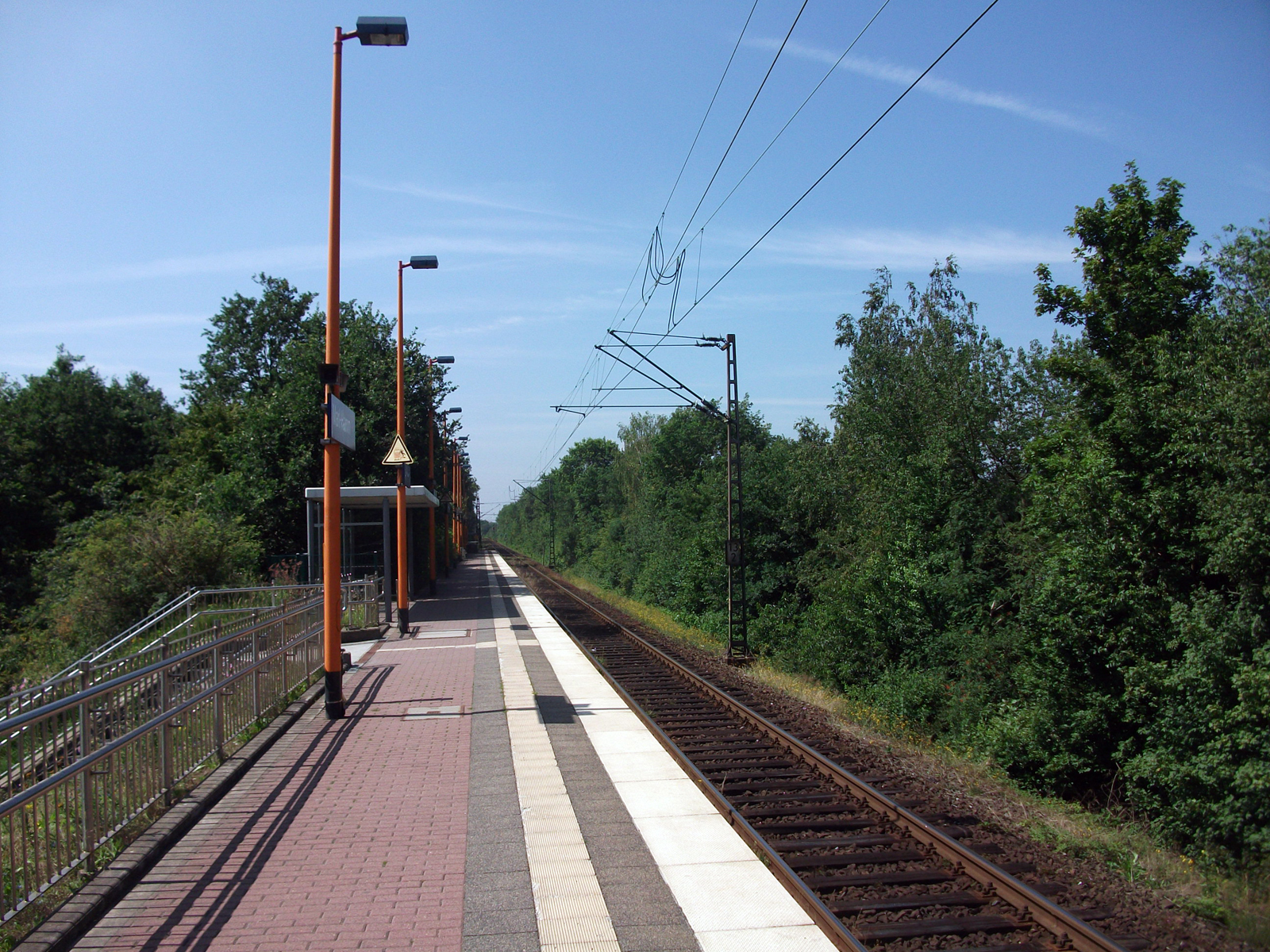
Marl-Hamm,
2011

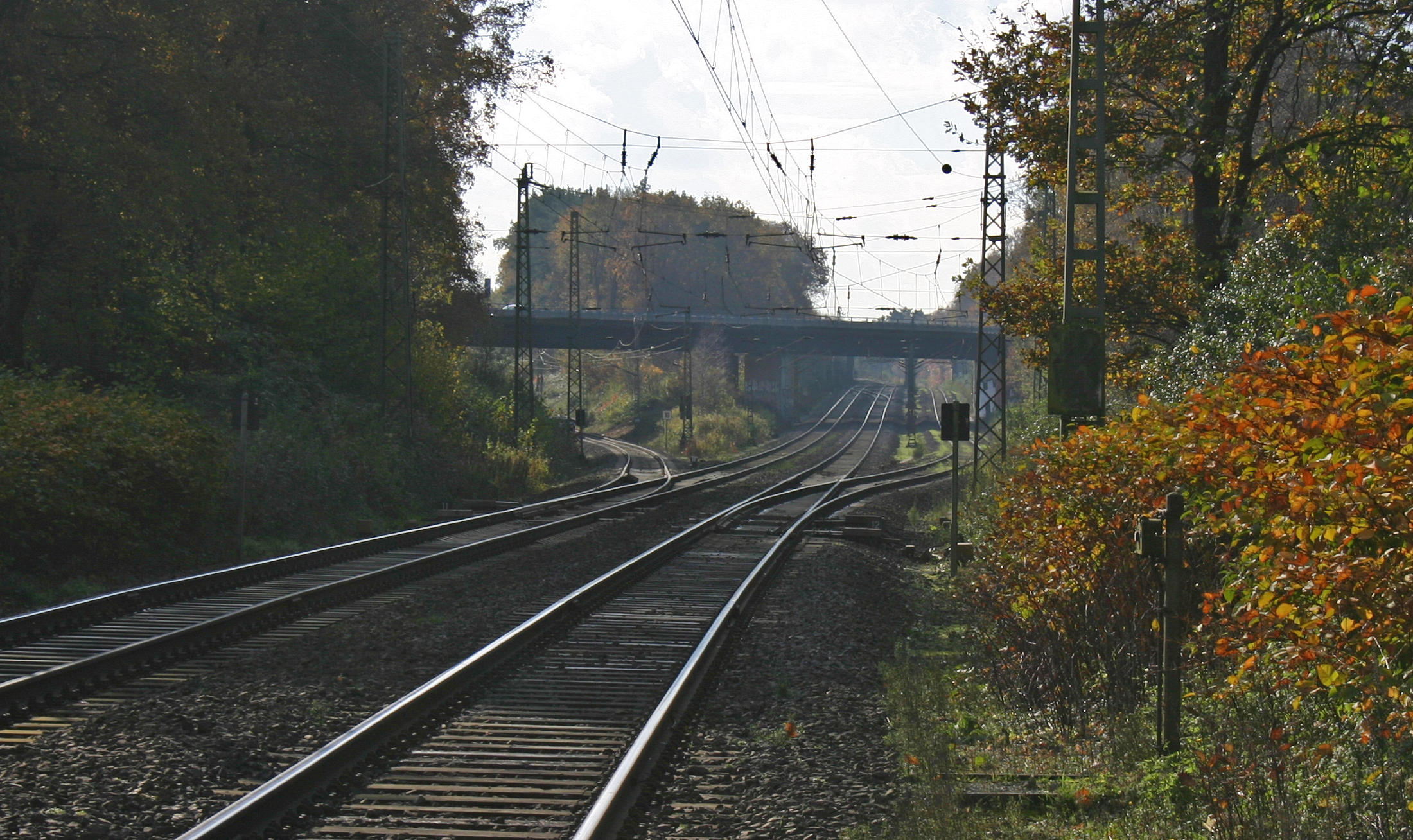
Marl Lippe,
2014

The line is structurally prepared for a second track. The junction in Gelsenkirchen-Buer Nord station has a second track base south of the Oberhausen-Osterfeld Süd–Hamm railway. Most overpasses are provided with abutments for the second track and similarly the underpasses have room for a second track. Marl Mitte station is designed to be an island platform, although an access crosses over the unused platform edge. The platform in Marl-Hamm lies on the path of the second track.

=== Control and signalling technology ===
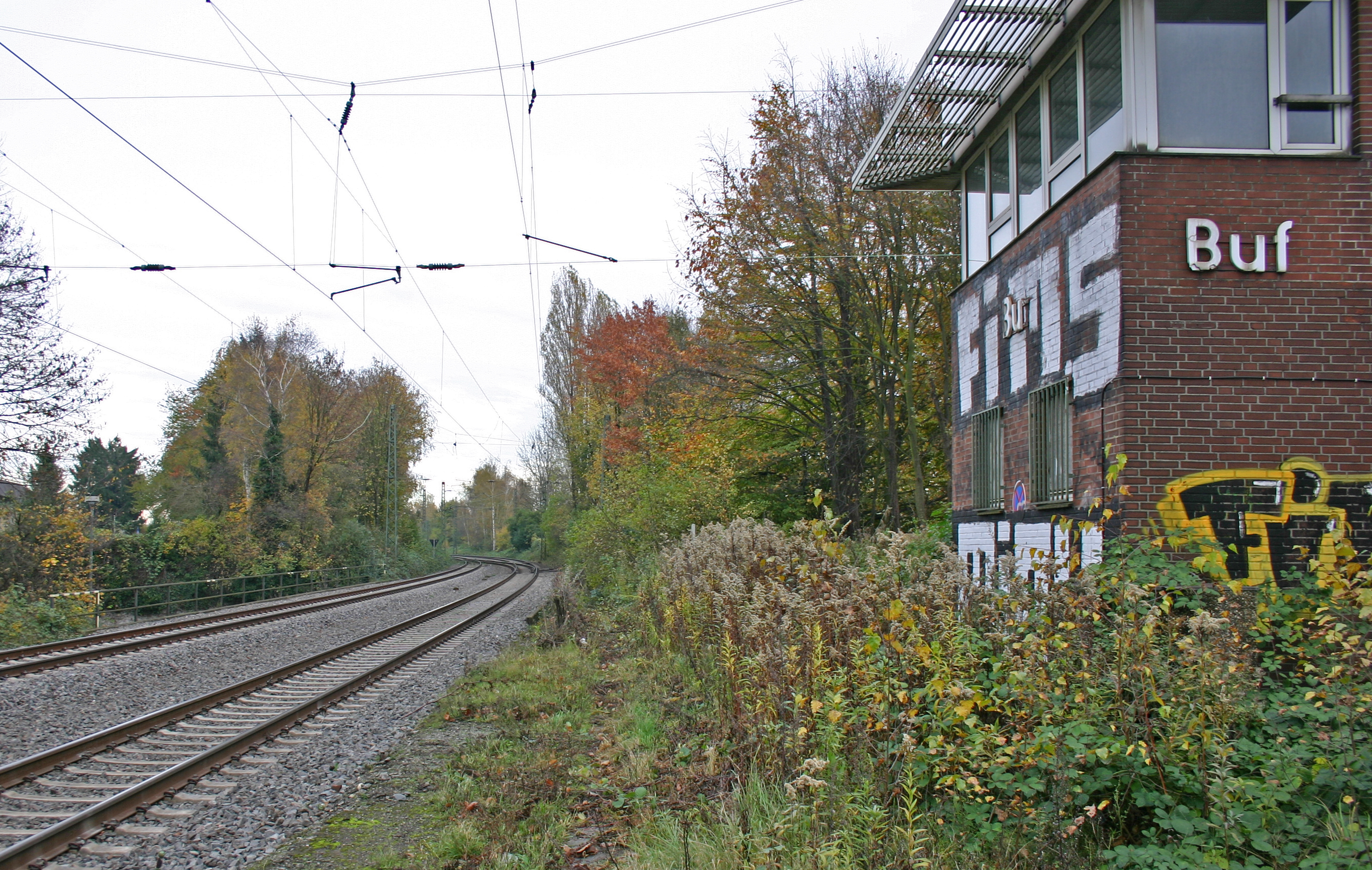
Signal box Buf in Gelsenkirchen-Buer Nord, 2014

The line has been controlled since the opening by three signal boxes. These are located at Gelsenkirchen-Buer Nord station, at the Marl CWH connecting point and at Haltern am See station (until 1986 at Marl Lippe junction). Signal box "Buf" ("Bu" for Gelsenkirchen-Buer Nord and "f" for Fahrdienstleiter—dispatcher) was a relay interlocking of the SpDrL30 class. The junction signal box in Marl CWH (DrS2 class) was remotely controlled. The block signal in Marl CWH allows higher utilisation of the single-track line. Since 2007, both interlockings have been remotely controlled by electronic interlocking "Of" in Oberhausen-Osterfeld station, the existing systems were replaced by Bereichsrechner (area computers).

Marl Lippe Junction initially had its own signal box of DrS2 class. After 1986, it was controlled from signal box "Hf" at Haltern am See station. The dispatcher could operate it from a separate control panel of the SpDrL60 class. Since 1998, with the transfer of control to the "Df" electronic control centre in Dülmen, signal box "Hf" continues to operate as an area computer. The Wanne-Eickel–Hamburg line in the area south of Haltern is adapted for bidirectional signalling to allow the trains of the Gelsenkirchen-Buer Nord–Marl Lippe railway to run on the track normally used for southbound trains to Haltern. As the trains usually reverse at the western platform 1 in Haltern, this eliminates the need for an at-grade crossing of the mainline tracks in the station.

== Services ==
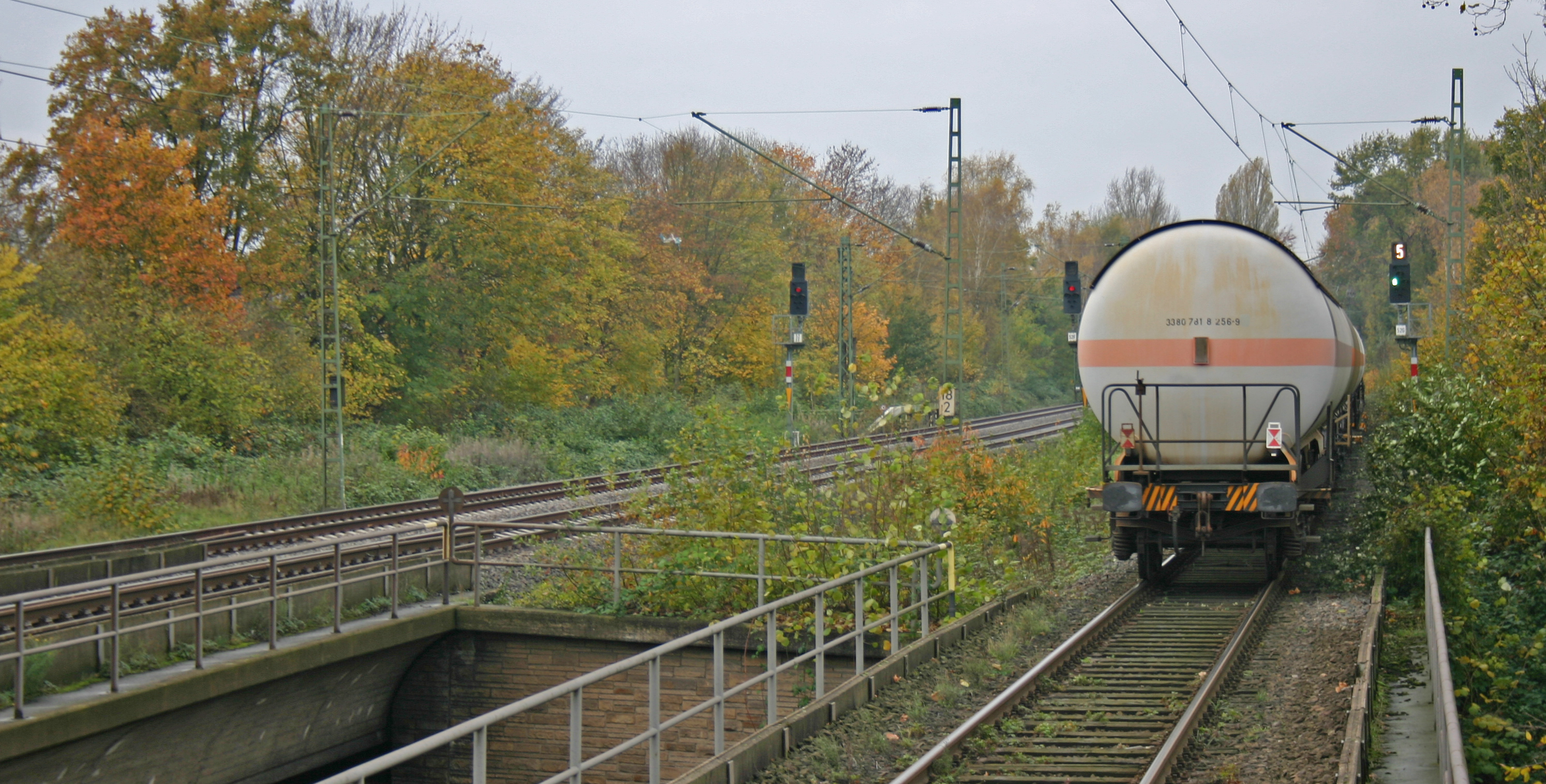
Entrance of a tanker train coming from Marl CWH in Gelsenkirchen-Buer Nord, 2014

The line was operated as timetable route (KBS) 234b at first, then as KBS 321 between 1972 and 1983, as KBS 381 until 1992 and as KBS 446 until 1998. Since the establishment of the S-Bahn, it has been operated as KBS 450.9.

Local trains ran over the line from Haltern to Essen and beyond to Velbert and Wuppertal. Like the "V9" designation popularly given to the line, the trains originally ran as line N9 and have run as the S9 since 1998. The trains ran about hourly and this frequency was maintained with the changeover to S-Bahn operations. An increase in frequencies was difficult because the line has little alternative track. Until the 1990s, individual express services also ran over the line between Münster and Duisburg (sometimes continuing to Aachen via Krefeld); these trains stopped between Haltern and GE-Buer Nord only in Marl Mitte. The S9 originally ran from Haltern am See to Essen-Steele Ost until 1998. Since 2003, the service has run via Haltern am See - Marl - Gladbeck West - Bottrop - Essen Hbf - Velbert-Langenberg - Wuppertal Hbf.

The services were initially operated with locomotives of class 212 with Silberling coaches; semi-fast trains were occasionally operated with class 430/830 electric railcars. The S9 services was initially operated with class 143 locomotives and x-Wagen (x-coaches) and later with class 420/421 sets. Since 2009, DB Regio has operated the services with class 422/432 railcars.

Freight traffic consists mostly of traffic to Chemiepark Marl.
