= Marl-Sinsen station =

Railway station in Marl, Germany

Marl Sinsen
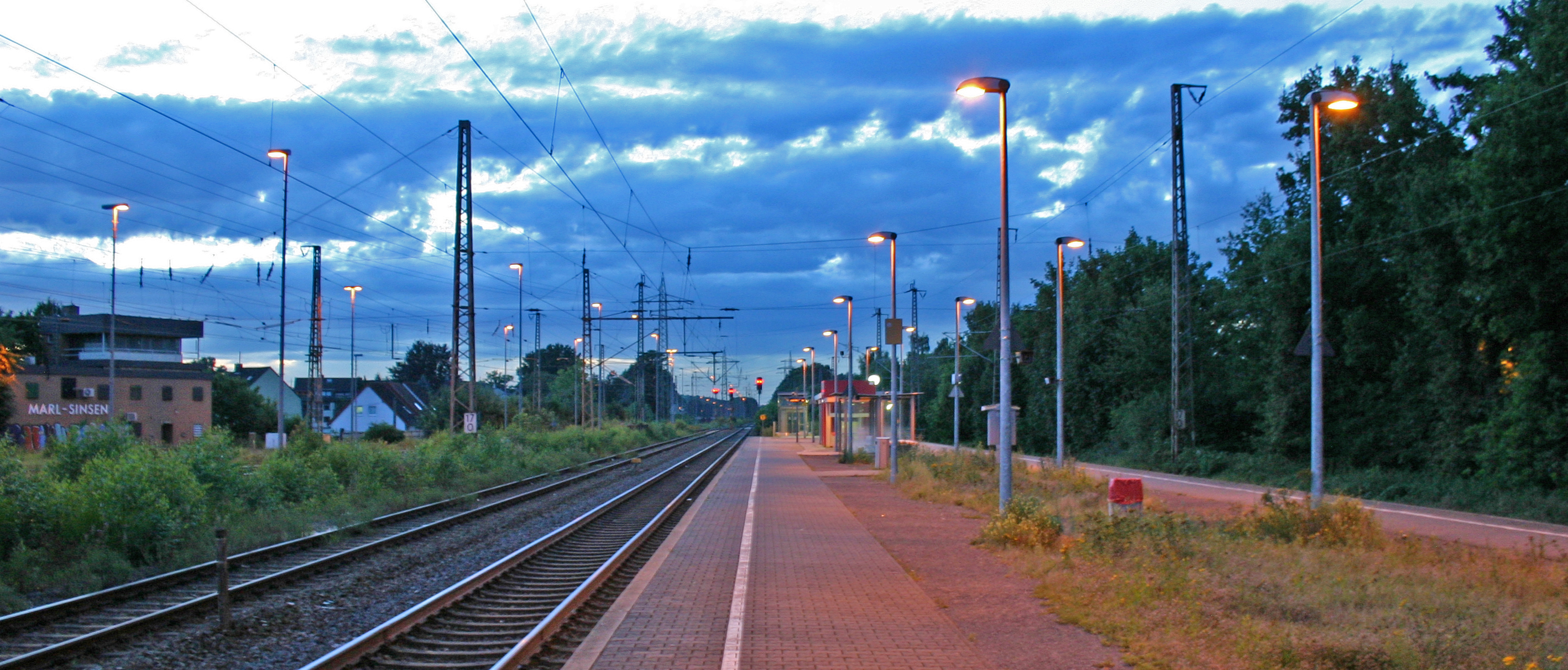
- View of the platform, 2014

General information
- Location: Bahnhofstr. 158, Sinsen-Lenkerbeck, Marl, NRW; Germany
- Coordinates: 51°40′03″N 7°10′24″E
- Line: Wanne-Eickel–Hamburg (km 17.1)
- Platforms: 2

Construction
- Accessible: Yes

Other information
- Station code: 3984
- DS100 code: EMSI
- IBNR: 8003891
- Category: 5
- Fare zone: VRR: 152
- Website: www.bahnhof.de

History
- Opened: 1880/86

Services
Preceding station	DB Regio NRW	Following station
Recklinghausen Hbf towards Düsseldorf Hbf	RE 2	Haltern am See towards Osnabrück Hbf
Recklinghausen Hbf towards Bochum Hbf	RE 41	Haltern am See Terminus
Recklinghausen Hbf towards Mönchengladbach Hbf	RE 42	Haltern am See towards Münster Hbf
Location

Marl-Sinsen is the one of three stations in the city of Marl in the German state of North Rhine-Westphalia. The station is classified as station category 5 and is under the station administration of Münster.

== Location ==
Signal box Sif, 2014

The station is located on Bahnhofstraße (which is an extension of the Bergstraße/Victoriastraße alignment) at its intersection with Gräwenkolkstraße in the Marl district of Sinsen-Lenkerbeck.

The station is near line kilometre 17.056 on the Wanne-Eickel–Hamburg railway (Wanne-Eickel Hauptbahnhof – Hamburg Hauptbahnhof).

== History ==
It was established between 1880 and 1886 on the Wanne-Eickel–Hamburg railway as a stop for farming settlement (Bauerschaft) of Sinsen. Around 25 years after its incorporation into Marl in 1926, the station was renamed Marl-Sinsen at the beginning of the 1950s.

Between 1914 and 1977, it was possible to change at the station to and from the tramways of the Vestische Kleinbahnen and the Vestische Straßenbahnen.

== Operations ==
=== Passenger services ===
The station is served only by regional services of the so-called Haard-Achse network: the RE 2 Rhein-Haard-Express (Münster (Westf) Hbf – Düsseldorf Hbf) and the RE 42 Niers-Haard-Express (Münster (Westf) Hbf – Mönchengladbach Hbf). Both lines are operated by DB Regio AG, Region NRW as part of the Rhein-Haard network.

Line	Route	Interval
RE 2	Rhein-Haard-Express: Osnabrück – Münster Hbf – Haltern am See – Marl-Sinsen – Recklinghausen – Wanne-Eickel – Gelsenkirchen – Essen – Mülheim – Duisburg – Düsseldorf; Status: December 2023 timetable	Some trains at night
RE 41	Vest-Ruhr-Express: Bochum – Recklinghausen – Marl-Sinsen – Haltern am See; Status: December 2023 timetable	60 min
RE 42	Niers-Haard-Express: Münster – Dülmen – Haltern am See – Marl-Sinsen – Recklinghausen – Wanne-Eickel – Gelsenkirchen – Essen – Mülheim – Duisburg – Krefeld – Mönchengladbach; Status: December 2023 timetable	60 min

There is no station building and access to the only existing platform is via a staircase or a lift from the road underpass. The station was recently upgraded to a 76 centimetre-high platform to give accessibility for the disabled to railway vehicles running there. The Verkehrsverbund Rhein-Ruhr announced in 2017 that it was planned to raise the platform to a height of 76 centimetres and to modernise the station facilities by 2023 at the latest as part of the Modernisierungsoffensive 3 (modernisation campaign, MOF 3), which is co-financed by the federal and state governments.

=== Freight operations ===
In freight transport, the station is of greater importance as the connecting line to the Auguste Victoria colliery begins from it; this also connects to the neighbouring Marl-Chemiepark Power Station. Until the closure of the mine in 2015, Marl-Sinsen was the transfer station for coal trains that were hauled by the locomotives of the colliery to the Sinsen station and from there over the tracks of the DB. For this purpose, there are extensive railway tracks west of the platform, both to the north (the colliery's transfer station) and to the south (the DB freight yard).

The operation of the traffic of the Quarzwerke Group at Sythen is also handled by Deutsche Bahn at Marl-Sinsen.
