= Haltern am See station =

Railway station in Haltern am See, Germany

Haltern am See
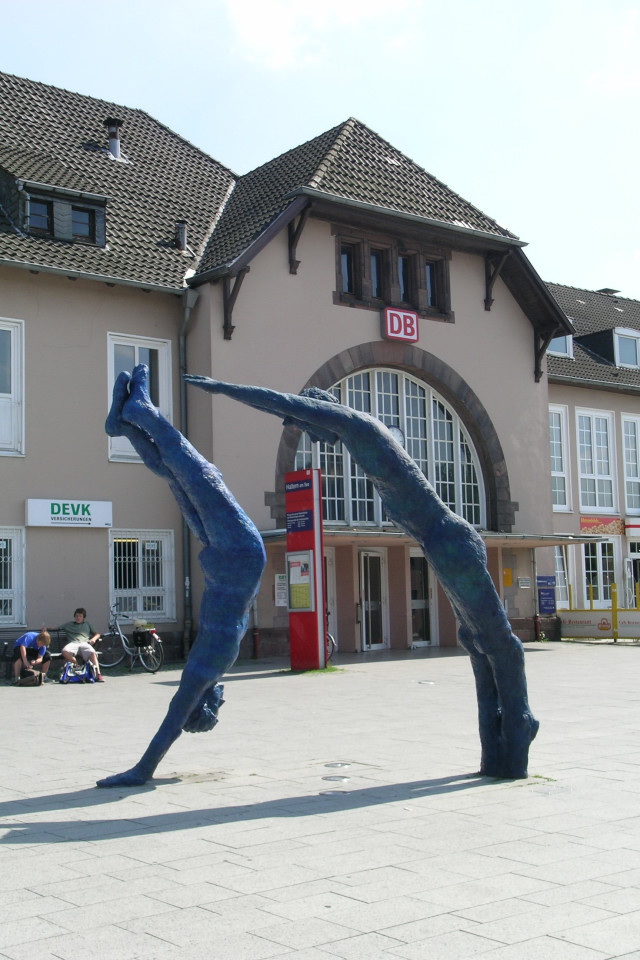
- Station with sculptures

General information
- Location: Haltern am See, NRW; Germany
- Coordinates: 51°44′16″N 7°11′05″E
- Owner: Deutsche Bahn
- Operator: DB Netz; DB Station&Service
- Lines: Wanne-Eickel–Hamburg (KBS 425); Haltern–Venlo
- Platforms: 3

Construction
- Accessible: Yes

Other information
- Station code: 2510
- DS100 code: EHLT
- IBNR: 8000145
- Category: 4
- Fare zone: VRR: 060
- Website: www.bahnhof.de

History
- Opened: 1 January 1870

Services
Preceding station	DB Regio NRW	Following station
Marl-Sinsen towards Düsseldorf Hbf	RE 2	Dülmen towards Osnabrück Hbf
Marl-Sinsen towards Bochum Hbf	RE 41	Terminus
Marl-Sinsen towards Mönchengladbach Hbf	RE 42	Sythen towards Münster Hbf
Preceding station	Rhine-Ruhr S-Bahn	Following station
Terminus	S9	Marl-Hamm towards Hagen Hbf
Location

Haltern am See station is a railway station in the town of Haltern am See in the German state of North Rhine-Westphalia on Wanne-Eickel–Hamburg railway from Wanne-Eickel to Hamburg. It is the northern terminus of Rhine-Ruhr S-Bahn line S9. It was opened in 1870.

== Service ==
It is served by the Rhein-Haard-Express RE 2 (hourly), the Vest-Ruhr-Express RE 41 (hourly), the Niers-Haard-Express RE 42 (every 30 mins), and S-Bahn line S9 (hourly).

== Renovations ==
=== Post-War Reconstructions ===
During World War II, the station was severely damaged, but was quickly reconstructed after the War ended. Between 1945 and 1948 during the post-war monetary crisis and Hyperinflation which followed with the collapse of Germany's former currency, the Reichsmark the area around the station became a popular place for illegal trading and black market activities.

=== Modern Renovations ===
In 2018, Platforms 2 and 3 were completely replaced and a new roof added. The new platforms have been adjusted in size to allow easier boarding of trains. Since 2022 all platforms are fully accessible via an underpass with three elevators. A renovation of the station building is set to begin in late 2027
