= Gelsenkirchen-Bismarck–Winterswijk railway =

Railway line in Germany and the Netherlands

Winterswijk–Gelsenkirchen-Bismarck railway
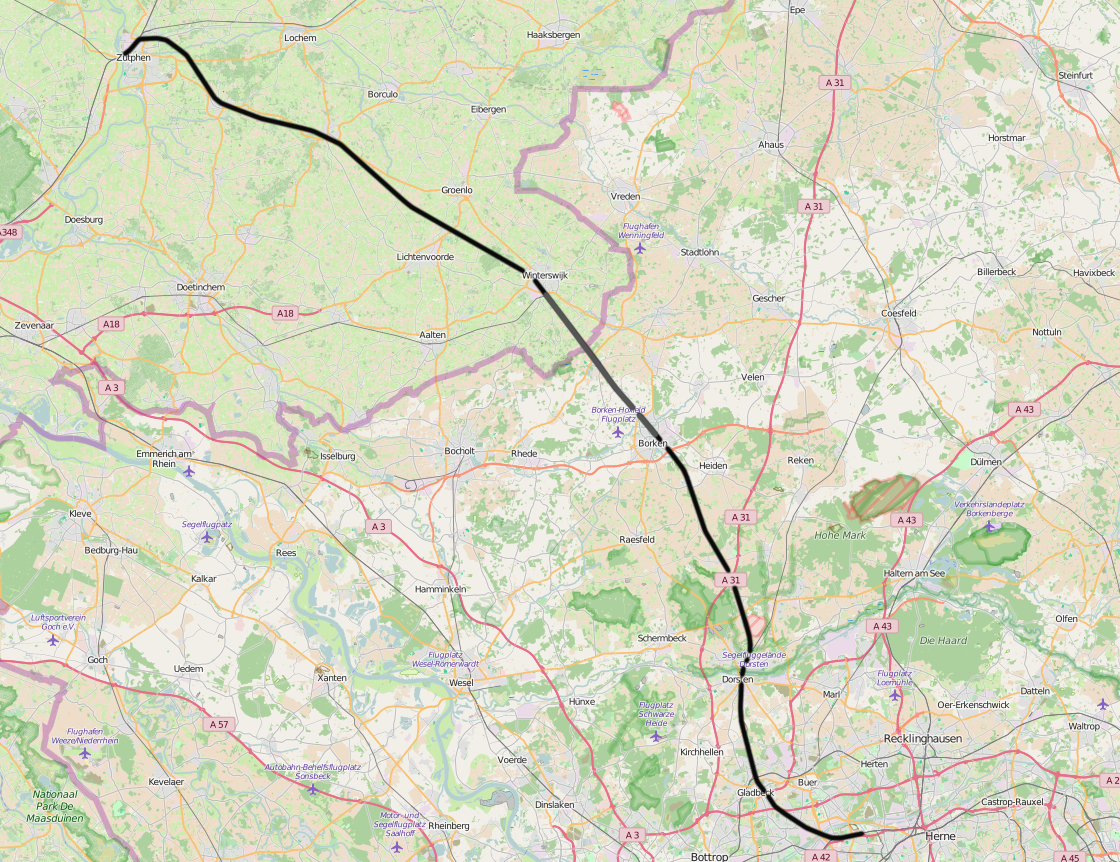

Overview
- Line number: 2236
- Locale: North Rhine-Westphalia, Germany, Gelderland, Netherlands

Service
- Route number: 423

Technical
- Line length: 59 km (37 mi)
- Number of tracks: 2: Zweckel–Dorsten junction
- Track gauge: 1,435 mm (4 ft 8 1/2 in) standard gauge
- Operating speed: 100 km/h (62.1 mph) or 80 km/h (49.7 mph)

The Winterswijk–Gelsenkirchen-Bismarck railway is a formerly continuous, 59 kilometre-long railway line, built by the former Dutch Westphalian Railway Company (Niederländisch-Westfälische Eisenbahn-Gesellschaft), from Winterswijk in the Netherlands to Bismarck, now part of Gelsenkirchen, in the northern Ruhr region of the German state of North Rhine-Westphalia.

The part of the line that is still in operation today is largely single-track and non-electrified and is classified as a main line.

== History ==
The Dutch Westphalian Railway Company received a concession on 26 June 1878 for the construction of a railway line that would connect the Ruhr area as directly as possible to the network of the Dutch railways in Winterswijk and Zutphen.

It began the construction of the line in Winterswijk, which was already connected to a railway line to Zutphen. From there, the line runs nearly directly to Hervest via Borken. There the line met the Duisburg–Quakenbrück railway, which in the meantime had been opened by the Rhenish Railway Company in 1879, and followed it to Dorsten. The last section ran in a wide arc to the south-east and met the Royal Westphalian Emscher Valley Railway at Hugo junction. The line ended in Bismarck station, now Gelsenkirchen-Bismarck marshalling yard, of the Royal Westphalian Railway Company and the Bergisch-Märkische Railway Company, on the Bergisch-Märkische Emscher Valley Railway. The two companies were already operating in cooperation with each other. Passenger traffic on the line started on 21 June 1880 under the management of the Bergisch-Märkische Railway Company from the beginning.

=== Partial closure ===
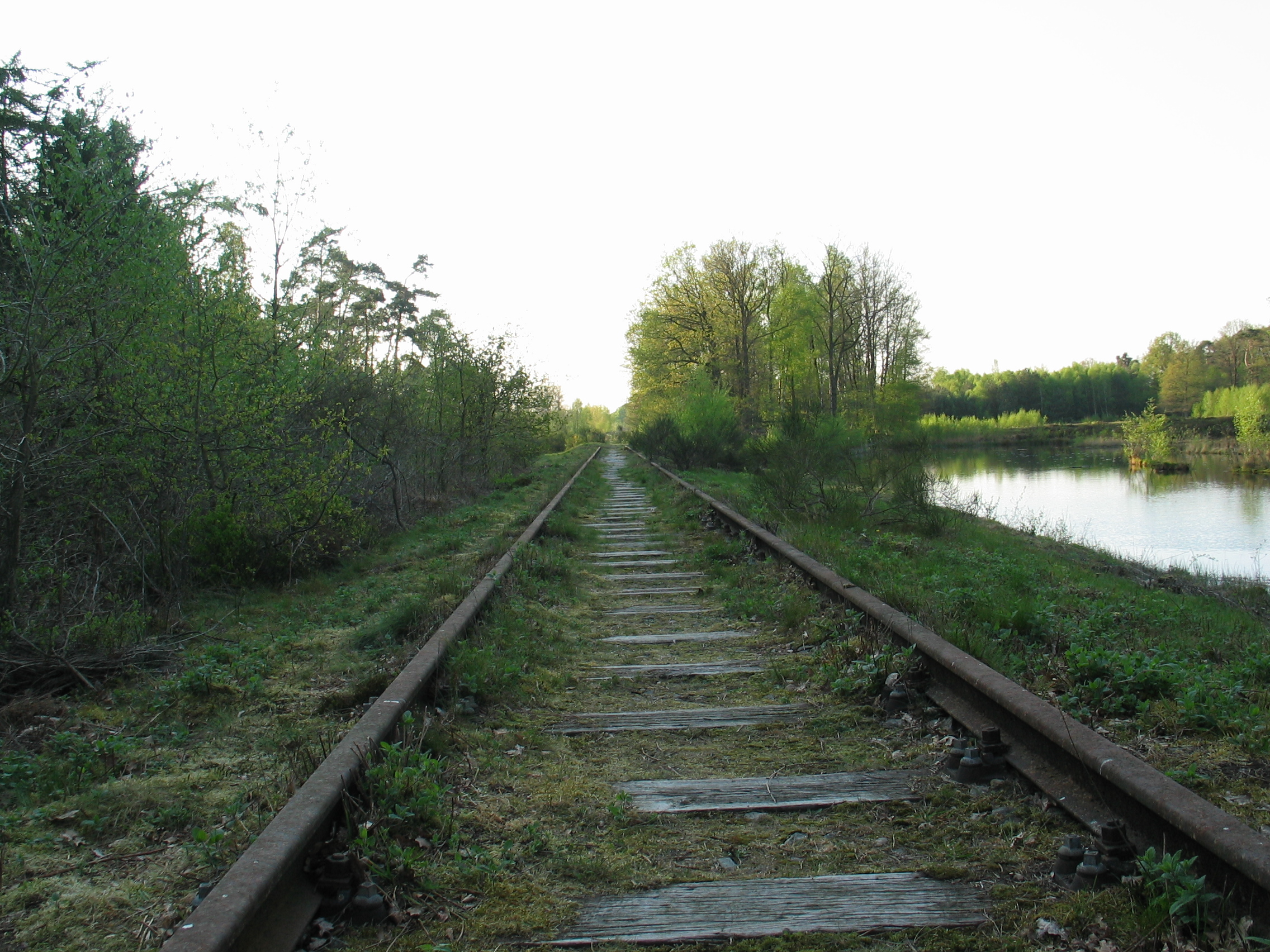
Line between Winterswijk and Borken

At the beginning of the First World War, cross-border traffic between Burlo and Winterswijk was stopped, but it was restored in the late 1920s. At the beginning of the Second World War, passenger services were finally abandoned, while the last freight train ran on 30 September 1979. The Dutch part of the track was declared a nature reserve, making its reopening difficult.

Passenger services were abandoned between Borken and Burlo on 29 September 1961, while freight traffic continued until 30 September 1994. This section was formally closed on 1 January 1996.

== Current situation ==
The main part of the line between Gelsenkirchen Zoo station (one kilometre east of the Gelsenkirchen-Bismarck marshalling yard) and Borken station is still open as a non-electrified and largely single-track line. The line is double track from Zweckel junction, near Gladbeck West station, where with a link from the Osterfeld-Hamm line to line Gelsenkirchen-Bismarck-Winterswijk, to Zweckel, Feldhausen and Dorsten station. From there to Hervest-Dorsten station the line runs parallel to the line to Coesfeld, creating the impression of a double-track line. Usage by the line RE 14 Emscher-Münsterland-Express Essen - Borken (Westf)* / Coesfeld (Westf)* (* wing train)

On the section of the line that is still in operation there are now 37 crossings, eleven with full barriers, 18 with half barriers and three which just have a flashing light, which means that there is an average of just over one kilometre between each crossing. A special feature is the railway crossing in Gelsenkirchen-Beckhausen, where this line crosses a narrow-gauge railway operated by BOGESTRA at an at-grade crossing.

== Rail services ==
The majority of the line is still served by public transport services:

- Regionalbahn service RB 43 (Emschertal-Bahn) runs from Dortmund follows the line from Gelsenkirchen Zoo, Gladbeck to Dorsten station.
- Regional-Express service RE 14 (Emscher-Münsterland-Express) from Essen via Bottrop, Gladbeck and Dorsten runs for more than 30 km—more than half of the original length of the line—between Zweckel junction and the end of the current line in Borken station. The RE 14 Service on its line branch between Dorsten to Coesfeld uses the parallel track between Dorsten station and Hervest-Dorsten.

The RB 43 is operated by DB Regio and the RE 14 are operated by NordWestBahn.

== External list ==
- "Connecting line 15: Dorsten CME ↔ Dorsten RhE". NRW Rail Archive (in German). André Joost.
- "Connecting line 2251: Zweckel ↔ Gladbeck West". NRW Rail Archive (in German). André Joost.
