= Dorsten station =

Railway station in North Rhine-Westphalia, Germany

Dorsten
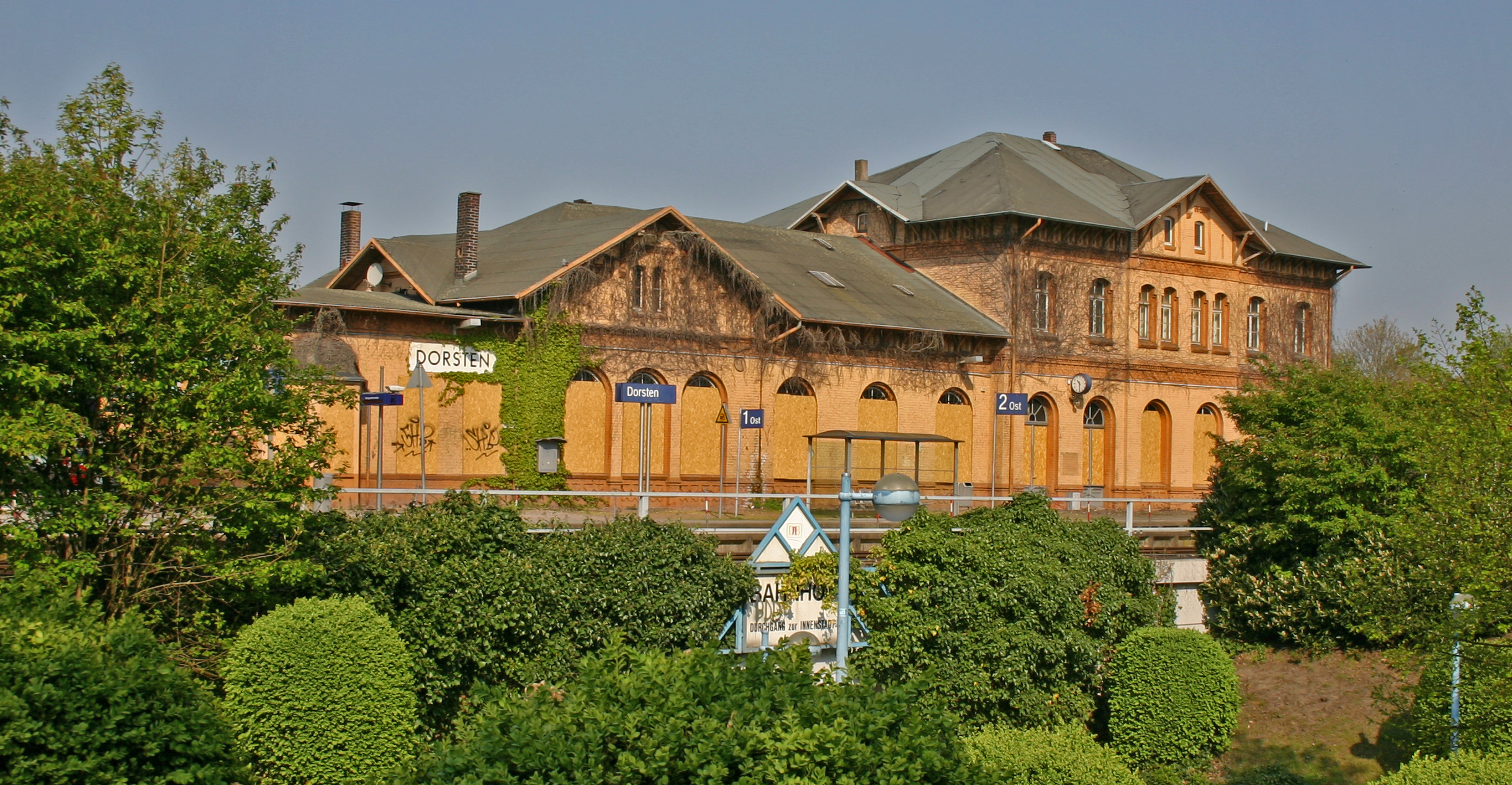
- Entrance building in 2014

General information
- Location: Vestische Allee 14, Dorsten, NRW; Germany
- Coordinates: 51°39′31″N 6°58′13″E
- Owner: DB Netz
- Operator: DB Station&Service
- Lines: Duisburg–Quakenbrück (23.2 km); Bismarck–Winterswijk (18.9 km)
- Platforms: 4
- Train operators: DB Regio NRW; NordWestBahn

Construction
- Accessible: Yes

Other information
- Station code: 1284
- DS100 code: EDRN
- IBNR: 8006709
- Category: 4
- Fare zone: VRR: 050
- Website: www.bahnhof.de

History
- Opened: 1 July 1879

Passengers
- < 5000 (2006)

Services
Preceding station	NordWestBahn	Following station
Hervest-Dorsten towards Borken (Westf) or Coesfeld (Westf)	RE 14	Bottrop-Feldhausen towards Essen Hbf
Preceding station	DB Regio NRW	Following station
Terminus	RB 43	Bottrop-Feldhausen towards Dortmund Hbf
Location
- Location within North Rhine-Westphalia

Dorsten station is the central station in the town of Dorsten in the German state of North Rhine-Westphalia. It is located east of the town centre and the line is orientated north-south.

== History ==
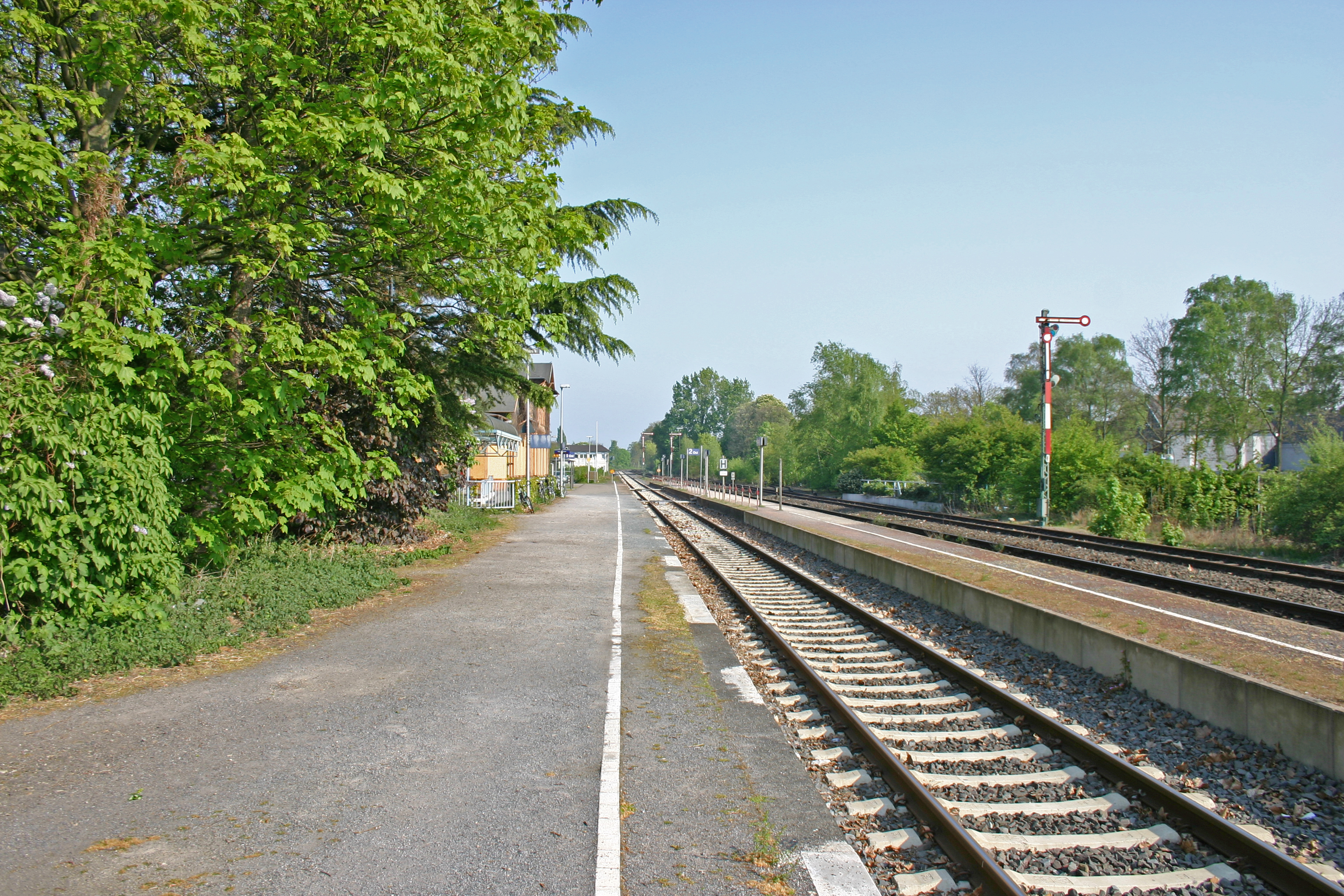
Platforms 1 east and 2 east, 2014

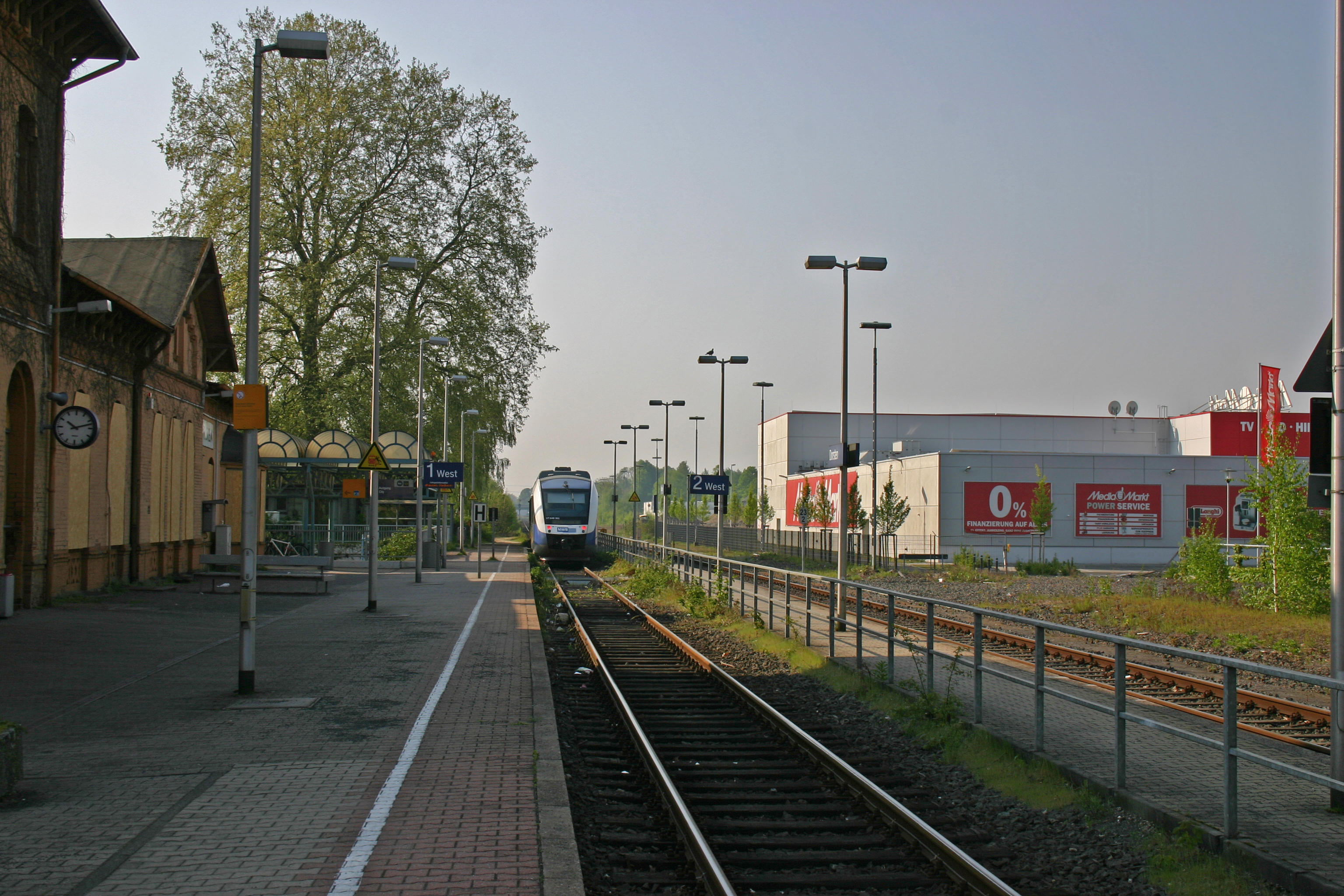
Platforms 1 west and 2 west with a DMU leaving for Oberhausen Hbf, 2014

The station was built in 1879 as a joint station of the Rhenish Railway and the Dutch Westphalian Railway. The Gelsenkirchen-Bismarck–Winterswijk railway of the Dutch Westphalian Railway was built to supply the textile industry of the Achterhoek region around Winterswijk with coal, but it was also used extensively in the opposite direction to bring food into the growing Ruhr district. The station building, built on an island between the tracks of the Duisburg–Quakenbrück railway (opened on 1 July 1879) on the west and the Gelsenkirchen-Bismarck–Winterswijk line (opened on 13 June 1880) on the eastern side, is now largely in its original condition.

Until the nationalisation of both railways in 1882, transfers between the two lines were carried out via a bay platform south of the building. Later a connection protected by signals and four marshalling tracks between the through tracks to the east and the west was built, along with a turntable with a diameter of 13 metres and a three-road roundhouse. The tracks for handling freight were extended considerably to the south and a new hump was built in 1912.

During the Ruhr Uprising in 1920, the bridges over the Lippe were attacked with explosives and made impassable and Dorsten was for several weeks the end of the line from the Ruhr. Similarly, Hervest station was the end of the line from the north. In 1923, Belgian troops occupied Dorsten station during the Occupation of the Ruhr and used it as a customs station on the border with Münsterland, which was not occupied.

In the 1930s, 26 pairs of passenger trains and about 40 freight trains ran through Dorsten each day.

Shortly before the end of the Second World War, the Wehrmacht destroyed the bridges over the Lippe and the Wesel–Datteln Canal and for two years Dorsten was again the northern terminus for the line.

After the war, the line to Oberhausen was not put back in operation, only a shuttle ran to Osterfeld-Nord until it was closed in 1960. In the 1950s, the train marshaling facility to the south of the station and the turntable were dismantled. The roundhouse is now used as a commercial building. The station building was renovated in 1985 and placed under monument protection in 1989. Since 2000, the town of Dorsten has tried to return the station building to active use, but this is complicated by the fact that it on an island between the tracks.

== Operations ==
=== Rail transport ===
Dorsten is a railway junction situated between the Ruhr and western Munsterland. It is served by the services on two routes running to and from numerous cities of the Ruhr (especially Essen and Dortmund) and the district towns of Borken (Westf) and Coesfeld (Westf) in Munsterland.

These services are operated by NordWestBahn on behalf of Verkehrsverbund Rhein-Ruhr (Rhine-Ruhr Transport Association). They are operated with Bombardier Talent (RE 14) and Pesa Link (RB 43) diesel multiple units. The station is operated by DB Station&Service.

Line	Name	Route	Frequency	Platform
RE 14	Emscher-Münsterland-Express	Borken (Westf) / Coesfeld (Westf) – Dorsten – Gladbeck West – Bottrop – Essen	30 min	2 east to Borken (Westf); 2 west to Essen Hbf
RB 43	Emschertal-Bahn	Dorsten – Gladbeck Ost – Wanne-Eickel – Herne – Castrop-Rauxel Süd – Dortmund	60 min	1 east

Two of the platforms still in use today, platform 1 east and platform 1 west, are next to the station building. The other platforms (2 east and 2 west) are island platforms that are accessed over pedestrian level crossings.

=== Bus services ===
Immediately west of the station is the Dorsten bus station. From here there are bus routes operated by Vestische Straßenbahnen, Busverkehr Rheinland and Westfalenbus.

Line	Route
188	Dorsten ZOB (bus station) – Feldhausen – Gladbeck Oberhof (continuing as route 189 to Essen-Karnap)
274	Dorsten ZOB – Kiebeck – Hervest, Dorfstraße
276	Holsterhausen, Friedensplatz – Gemeinedreieck – Dorsten ZOB – St.-Nikolaus-Kirche – Hardt, Gahlener Straße
278	Holsterhausen, Wennemarstraße – Dorsten ZOB – Elisabeth-Krankenhaus – In der Miere
TB 279	Friedhof Hardt – Westwall – Dorsten ZOB – Altenzentrum Maria Lindenhof
293	Dorsten ZOB – Schermbeck (– Raesfeld-Erle)
296	Im Päsken – Dorsten ZOB – Östrich, Baumbachstraße
299	Dorsten ZOB – Schermbeck, Rathaus (– Wesel/Bus station)
R 21/295	Dorsten ZOB – Holsterhausen – Deuten – Raesfeld – Borken
SB 16	Dorsten ZOB – Kirchhellen – Bottrop Hbf – Essen Hbf
SB 25	Recklinghausen Hbf – Marl Mitte – Dorsten ZOB
SB 26	Marl Mitte – Brassert – Barkenberg – Alt-Wulfen – Dorsten ZOB
SB 28	Gelsenkirchen-Buer – Dorsten ZOB – Schermbeck

The bus station and car and bicycle parking area are connected by a pedestrian tunnel to the station building and the platforms.
