= Duisburg–Quakenbrück railway =

Railway line in Germany

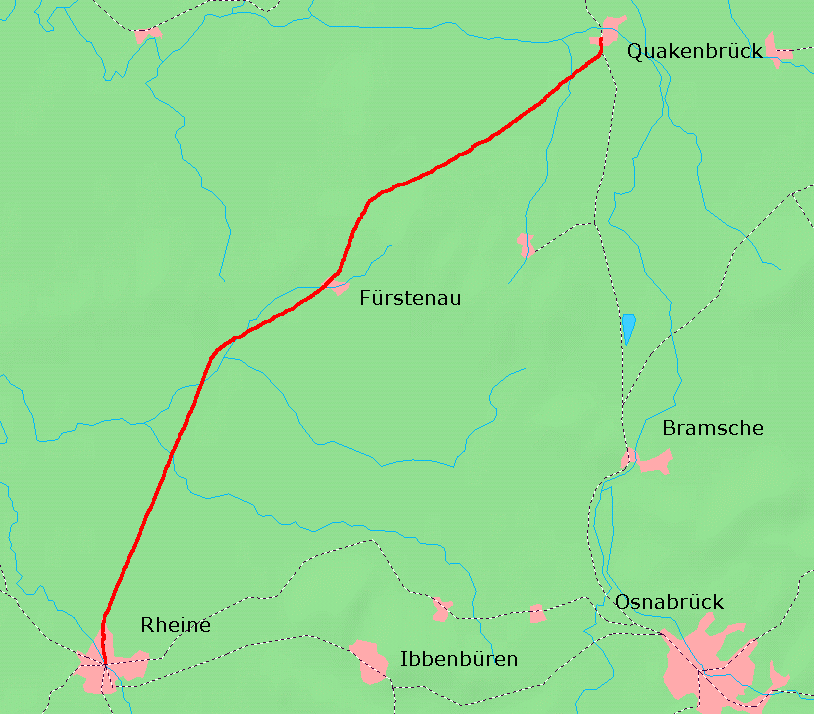
- Northern section of the line

Overview
- Native name: Bahnstrecke Duisburg–Quakenbrück
- Line number: 2320 (Duisburg – Oberhausen); 2280 (Oberhausen – Osterfeld); 2262 (Osterfeld – Bottrop); 2273 (Bottrop – Quakenbrück)
- Locale: North Rhine-Westphalia, Germany

Service
- Route number: 423 (Essen – Coesfeld)

Technical
- Line length: 173 km (107 mi)
- Number of tracks: Double track,Sigle – Oberhausen-Osterfeld junction only
- Track gauge: 1,435 mm (4 ft 8 1/2 in) standard gauge
- Electrification: 15 kV/16.7 Hz AC overhead catenary
- Operating speed: 90 km/h (56 mph) (maximum)

The Duisburg–Quakenbrück railway is a former inter-regional German railway, built by the Rhenish Railway Company (RhE) from Duisburg in the western Ruhr region of North Rhine-Westphalia to Quakenbrück in Lower Saxony on the border of the former Grand Duchy of Oldenburg. Some sections of it are now disused.

The railway ran from Duisburg via Oberhausen West, Bottrop Nord, Dorsten, Coesfeld, Steinfurt and Rheine to Quakenbrück where it connected with the network of the Grand Duchy of Oldenburg State Railways.

The majority of the line is now closed. The southern section to Bottrop is now used only for freight. The section between Dorsten and Coesfeld is still used for passengers as timetable route 423. Regionalverkehr Münsterland (RVM) operates freight traffic over the section between Rheine and Spelle.

For a detailed view of the section between Sigle junction and Walzwerk, see the Duisburg-Wedau–Bottrop Süd railway.

== History ==
The concession for the construction of 172.87 km-long railway line from Duisburg to Quakenbrück was granted to the Rhenish Railway Company on 9 June 1873. The line was completed on 1 July 1879 and thus entered into direct competition with the Wanne-Eickel–Hamburg railway, built by the Cologne-Minden Railway Company in the early 1870s, from the Ruhr via Munster and Osnabruck to Bremen (part of the "Hamburg–Venlo railway").

=== Route ===
The competition led to the construction of the line on a relatively straight alignment. To be competitive, the line in the Münsterland and the area between Rheine and Quakenbrück had to run as far as possible without major diversions and had to pass to the west of the ridge of the Teutoburg Forest in order to reduce transport costs and travel times. This would give the new connection a financial advantage over its competitor's line, which had run to the east through Osnabrück and Diepholz in order to avoid the area of the Oldenburg State Railways.

The Rhenish Railway Company, however, wished specifically to connect to the network of the Grand Duchy of Oldenburg State Railways in Quakenbrück, in order to make a continuous connection to both the Hanseatic city of Bremen and to Wilhelmshaven (which had been under development as a base of the Prussian Navy since 1866). The Oldenburg State Railways had already opened the Oldenburg–Wilhelmshaven railway and the Oldenburg–Bremen railway in 1866/7 and the Oldenburg–Osnabrück railway was completed via Quakenbrück in 1875.

=== Similar projects ===
The Rhenish Railway Company had already distinguished itself before the construction of the Duisburg–Quakenbrück line by the establishment of other competing routes:

- The construction of the Osterath–Dortmund Süd railway, which ran the partially parallel to the Duisburg–Dortmund railway opened by the Cologne-Minden Railway Company in 1847 and the Witten/Dortmund–Oberhausen/Duisburg railway completed by the Bergisch-Märkische Railway Company in 1862.
- the construction of the Krefeld–Nijmegen line opened between 1863 and 1865 to compete with the Oberhausen–Arnhem railway opened by the Cologne-Minden Railway Company in 1856.
- the Düsseldorf-Derendorf–Dortmund Süd railway completed in 1879 to compete with the Elberfeld–Dortmund railway completed by the Bergisch-Märkische Railway Company in 1849.

=== Regional significance ===
In addition to the national function of the line it also had regional importance. The section between Coesfeld and Rheine connected the lines of the Royal Westphalian Railway Company with the railway network of the western Münsterland.

=== Connections to coal mines ===
In contrast to the Osterath–Dortmund Süd railway of the Rhenish Railway Company, which connected to a number of coal mines, the Duisburg-Quakenbrück line had few connections to mining railways. The mines were the Jacobi and Franz Haniel pits in Oberhausen-Klosterhardt and the Osterfeld colliery.

=== Branch to Salzbergen ===
The plans for the line anticipated the construction of a 7.8 km-long branch line from Rheine to Salzbergen and this was authorised in 1878. Following the building of the Almelo–Salzbergen railway in 1865, the Rhenish Railway Company planned to establish a separate connection to the Dutch railway network in Emsland, parallel to the line opened on 23 June 1856 by the Hanoverian Western Railway (see also Löhne–Rheine railway and Emsland Railway).

=== Nationalisation ===
The construction of the branch to Salzbergen was not completed and was abandoned under a ministerial order on 31 March 1879 as a result of the nationalisation of the line.

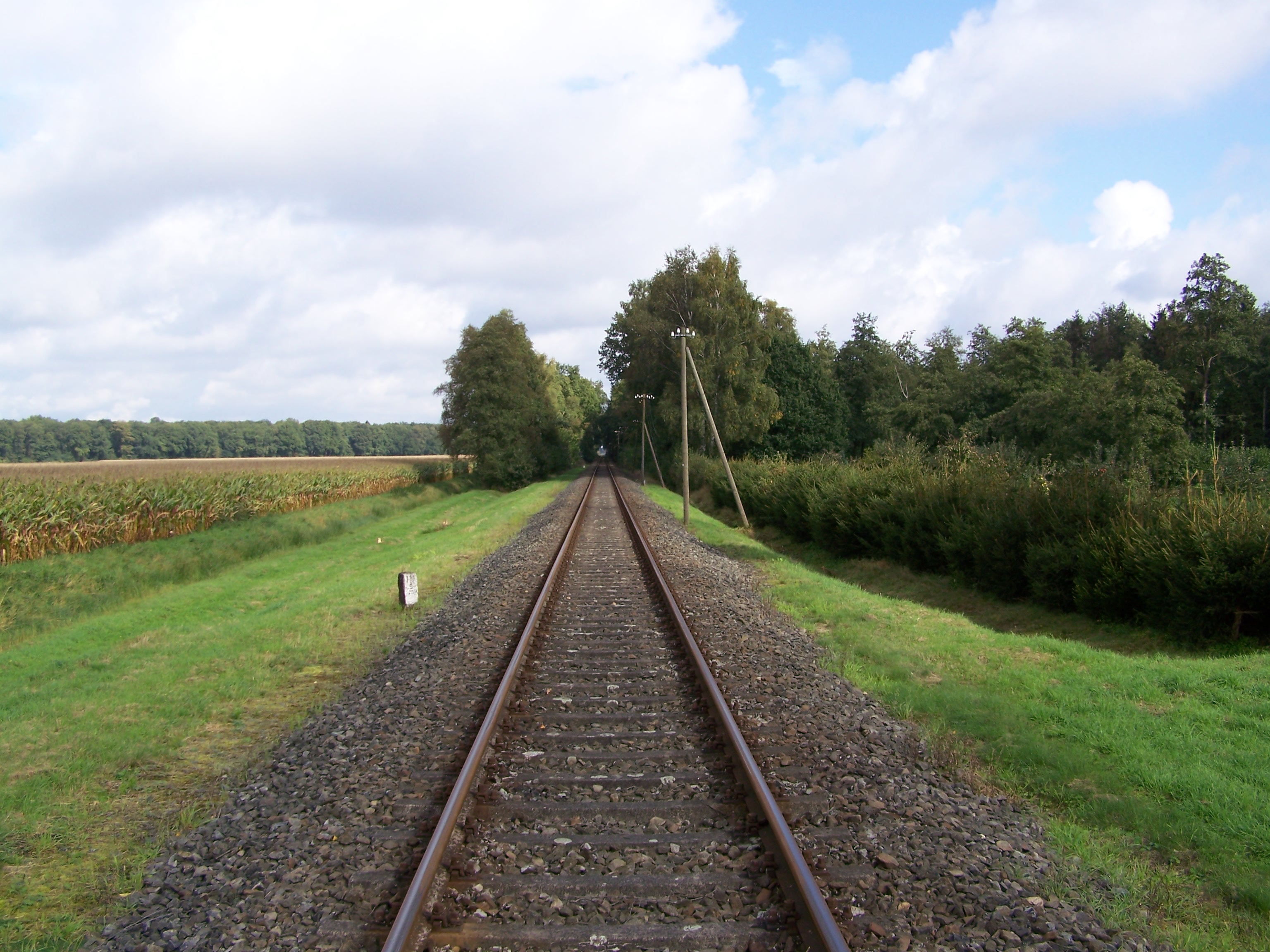
Line to the north of Rheine. The track alignment was prepared for a proposed second track. Its telephone poles still stand here.

The railway line from Duisburg via Rheine to Quakenbrück and Oldenburg is comparable to other lines in north-west Germany, such as the Ruhr–Münster–Emden or Ruhr–Münster–Bremen lines, which had limited economic significance. This is especially true of the Rheine–Quakenbrück section.

The low significance of the line was reflected in, among other things, the standard of technical equipment of the line: the Dorsten–Rheine section in 1935 was, along with the Lünen–Gronau and Münster–Gronau lines, one of the few lines under the administration of the railway division of Munster that was not equipped with electric block signalling. The line had military importance during the First World War due to the extensive coal shipments from the Ruhr to the naval base in Wilhelmshaven.

=== Destruction in the Second World War ===
After the nationalisation, the passenger service from Osterfeld nord to Duisburg Hbf was closed and instead passenger services ran to Oberhausen Central Station. At the end of the Second World War in 1945, all the bridges over the Rhine–Herne Canal and the Emscher river were blown up by the Wehrmacht. Passenger services were abandoned and freight traffic was later restored over a new bridge.

Due to the complete destruction of Rheine station on 5 October 1944, services had to be suspended between Rheine and Quakenbrück. At that time, Rheine station only had two tracks available for through traffic, an emergency station had to be set up north of the station in Eichenstraße (Friedensplatz). Traffic on the Quakenbrück route was not resumed until the summer of 1945, but only between Spelle and Quakenbrück because the Ems bridge in Rheine (between Rheine station and Altenrheine station) and the bridge over the Dortmund-Ems canal between Altenrheine and Spelle had not been rebuilt.

=== Resumption of traffic ===
In November 1945, trains could run from Quakenbrück to Altenrheine again. From here, the Tecklenburg Northern Railway (Tecklenburger Nordbahn), a former light railway connecting Piesberg (near Osnabrück) and Rheine) ran a shuttle to Rheine-Stadtberg station and from there through the town centre to Hues-Ecke station (Lingener Str./Emsstraße) on the right (north) bank of the Ems so as to temporarily maintain the connection from Quakenbrück to Rheine.

After the Second World War, trains ran a different route between Oberhausen and Dorsten because of destroyed bridges, instead of running via Oberhausen West, Osterfeld Nord, Bottrop Nord and Kirchhellen (23. 2 km), all trains ran from Oberhausen Hbf via Bottrop Hbf, Gladbeck West and Feldhausen to Dorsten (28 km). Passenger services were restored only briefly between Osterfeld-Nord and Dorsten and finally closed in 1960.

In the summer of 1950, for the first time after the war, one pair of services ran from Duisburg via Oberhausen, Rheine and Quakenbrück to Oldenburg until the abandonment of passenger services on the Rheine–Quakenbrück section on 31 May 1969. It subsequently ran between Duisburg and Rheine. It was operated from 1950 by class ET 487/488 diesel multiple units, in 1960 and in 1963/64 by E 829/830 carriages with locomotive-haulage, then again from 1966 with DB Class VT 24 diesel multiple units.

Deutsche Bundesbahn operated a variety of equipment between Dorsten and Coesfeld, including class 515 battery railcars and class 624 DMUs.

== Current operations ==
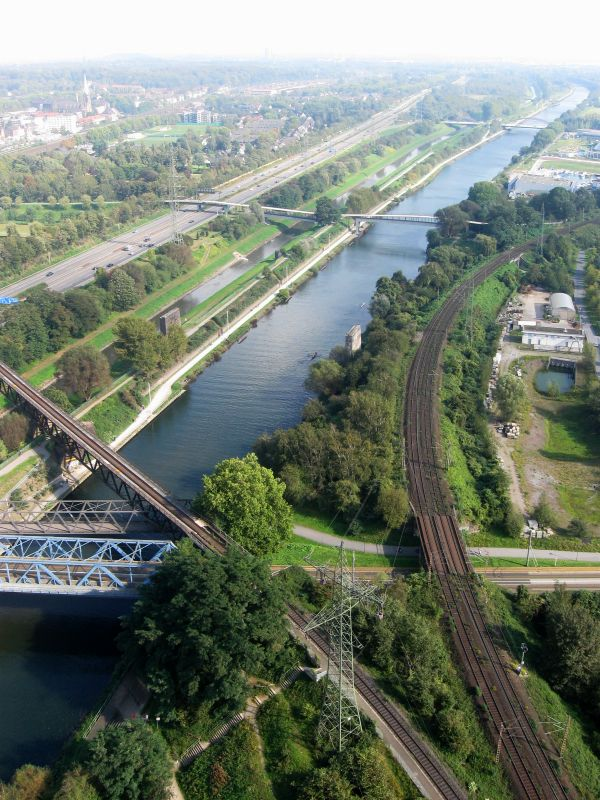
To the left is the bridge is the line over the Rhine-Herne Canal, to the right is the line to Essen-Frintrop, just after Osterfeld junction near Oberhausen Gasometer station

Large sections of the line are now closed and largely dismantled and services only run on certain sections. Some sections are used for cycle paths or cycle paths are planned.

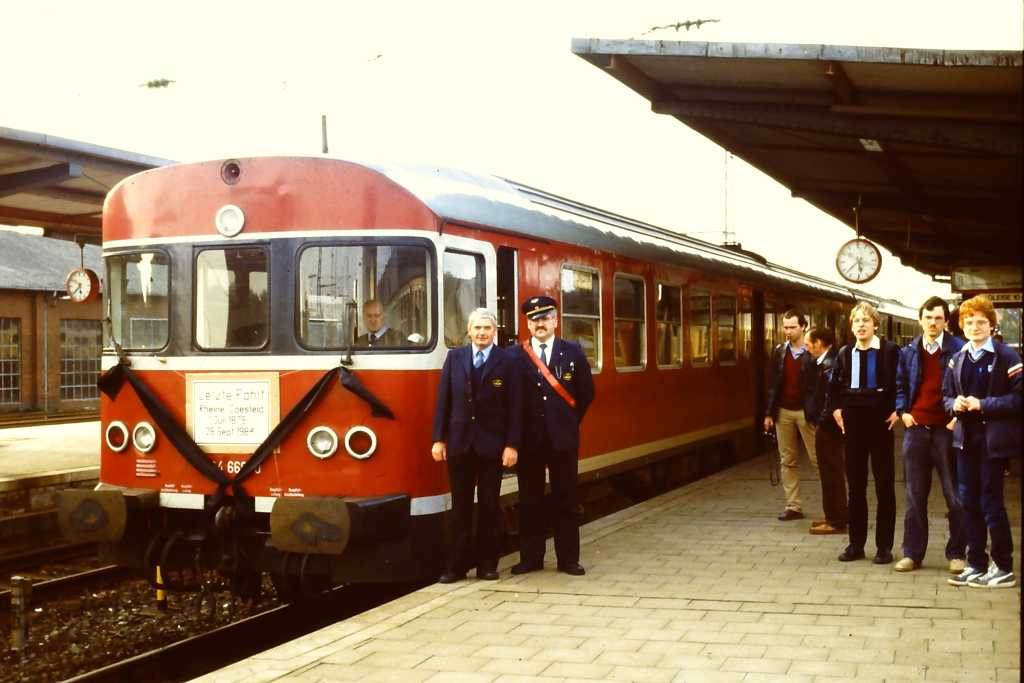
Last trip on the Rheine-Coesfeld service in 1984 at Rheine station

=== Duisburg–Bottrop ===
The line is now considered part of the connection from Duisburg to Oberhausen–Osterfeld Süd and to Essen-Frintrop and is electrified and classified as a main line, while the section from Oberhausen-Osterfeld junction at the Oberhausen Gasometer to Bottrop Delog/Detag is a single-track and non-electrified branch line.

At the gasometer the connecting curve to Osterfeld-Süd separates to run to the west of the gasometer with bridges over the Rhine-Herne Canal, the Emscher and autobahn 42. The line to Osterfeld-Nord and Bottrop-Nord separates to the east of the gasometer, also with bridges over the Rhine-Herne Canal, the Emscher, autobahn 42 and the single-track line to Osterfeld-Sud station. To the east of the gasometer, at Centro Oberhausen, the line to Essen-Frintrop separates and instead of crossing the canal runs towards the former Essen-Frintrop freight yard.

The remaining line up to Bottrop Delog/Detag is now exclusively used for freight traffic to the Pilkington flat glass factory, formerly Delog (Deutsche Libbey-Owens Gesellschaft)/Detag (Deutsche Tafelglas AG), which is in the area of the city of Gladbeck. The single-track section between Duisburg station and Sigle junction is rarely used.

=== Essen - Bottrop - Gladbeck - Dorsten – Coesfeld ===
RE 14: Emscher-Münsterland-Express

Service
- Route number: 423

Technical
- Line length: 70 km (43 mi)

The Dorsten–Coesfeld section is now part of Deutsche Bahn’s Münster-Ostwestfalen (East Westphalia) regional network, which has its headquarters in Münster. Operations are undertaken by NordWestBahn on behalf of the Verkehrsverbund Rhein-Ruhr (transport association of the Rhine-Ruhr) and the Zweckverband Nahverkehr Westfalen-Lippe (local transport association of Westphalia-Lippe).

Services on DB timetable route number 423 are operated as Regional-Express service RE 14 under the marketing name of Emscher-Münsterland-Express, mainly using Bombardier Talent diesel multiple units. It is planned to replace these with electric trains capable running from overhead line and batteries in a few years. Sections of RE 14 to/from Borken (Westf) are joined or split in Dorsten.

On weekdays, trains meet every hour on the section in Maria Veen at 29 minutes past the hour. On weekends services run every two hours.

=== Coesfeld–Rheine ===
On the section between Coesfeld and Rheine, passenger services were abandoned on 29 September 1984 and freight traffic ended on 1 January 1993. The direct route used by passenger services between Rheine and Hauenhorst was closed on 31 May 1986, while the slightly more curved line remained in service. Between 1994 and 1998 the whole line between Lutum and Rheine was closed in several stages. Between Coesfeld and Lutum, the Rheiner Gleis (“Rhenish track”) is now used by the Empel-Rees–Münster railway (Baumbergebahn), while its own track has been closed and dismantled.

The dismantling of the section between Steinfurt and St. Arnold was finally completed on 30 September 2005. The first sod for the construction of the Munsterland cycling track was turned at St. Arnold station on 16 December 2008. This new cycle path which has been usable from Lutum to Rheine since the autumn of 2012, was officially opened on 5 May 2013. Between Coesfeld and Lutum, the cycle track is connected to the existing cycling network, as the Duisburg-Quakenbrück line continues to be used by the Empel-Rees–Münster line.

=== Rheine–Quakenbrück ===
Passenger traffic on this section was closed on 31 May 1969. Today, the relatively large signal boxes in Beesten and Fürstenau are still a reminder on the extensive train operations in the recent past.

Prior to the total closure of the 23 km-long section between Rheine and Freren, the Rheine-Freren railway test facility was approved in 1979 to test the limits of the wheel-rail system at speeds up to 350 km/h, but construction was later cancelled.

Freight traffic between Spelle and Quakenbrück was abandoned on 1 January 1996. This section was closed in 1997. Freight operations on the Rheine–Spelle section have been assumed by Regionalverkehr Münsterland (RVM). Traffic essentially consists of sand, gravel and materials for the manufacture of precast concrete destined for the Rekers cement works in Spelle (about 8,000 wagon loads per year) and agricultural machinery dispatched from Maschinenfabrik Bernard Krone in Spelle. The dismantling of the line between the former end of the line and the bypass has begun north of Spelle. The tracks have been removed near the former station at Beesten.

Draisine rides are now offered between Fürstenau and Nortrup and between Nortrup and Quakenbrück. However, there is no continuous serviceable route between Fürstenau and Quakenbrück anymore.

== Fares ==
Westfalentarif

The line is located in the fare/transport associations Rheinland-Tarif, Westfalen-Tarif and Verkehrsgemeinschaft Osnabrueck.

== Other photographs ==
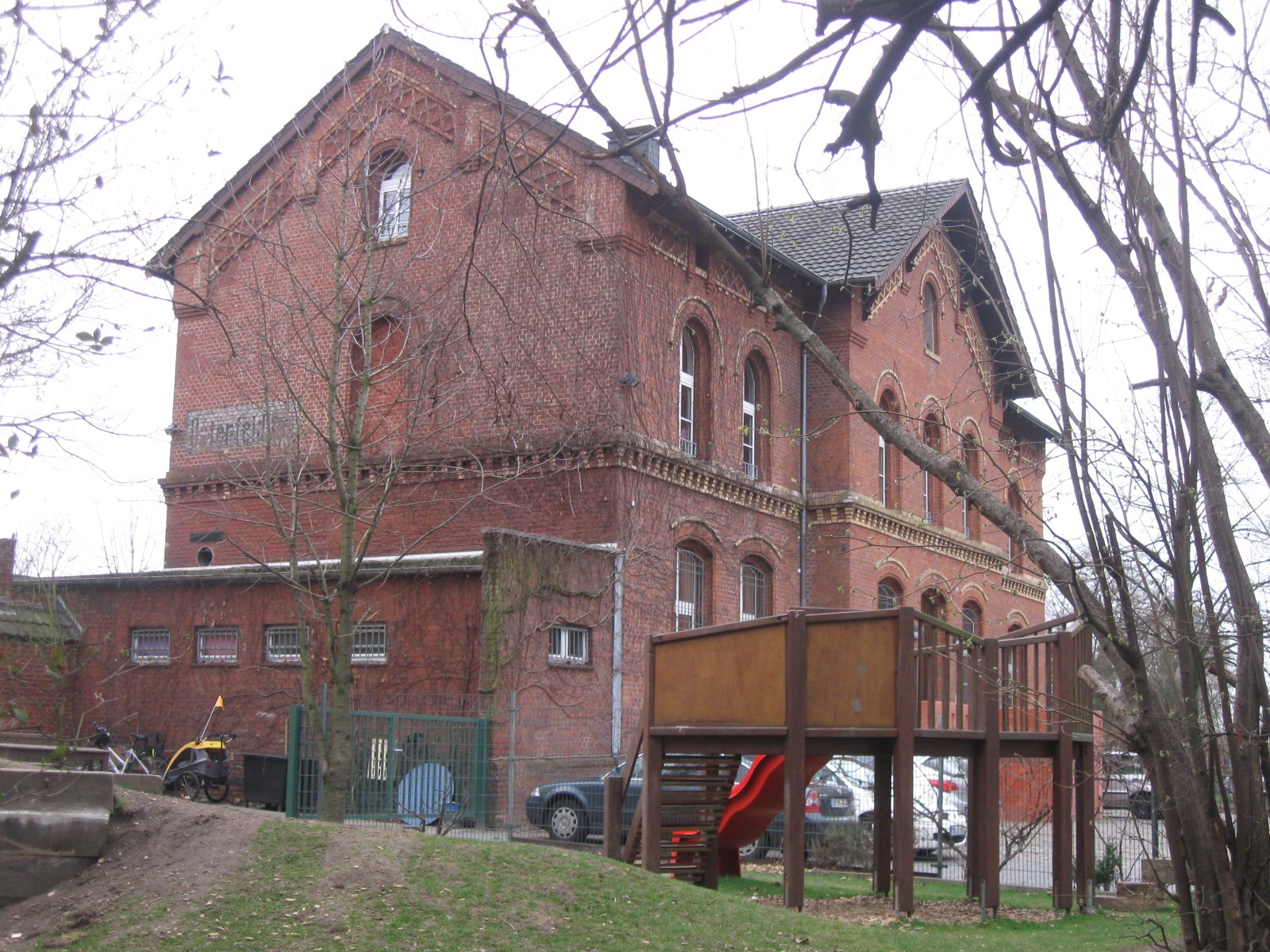
The former Osterfeld Nord station building now houses a Waldorf day care centre

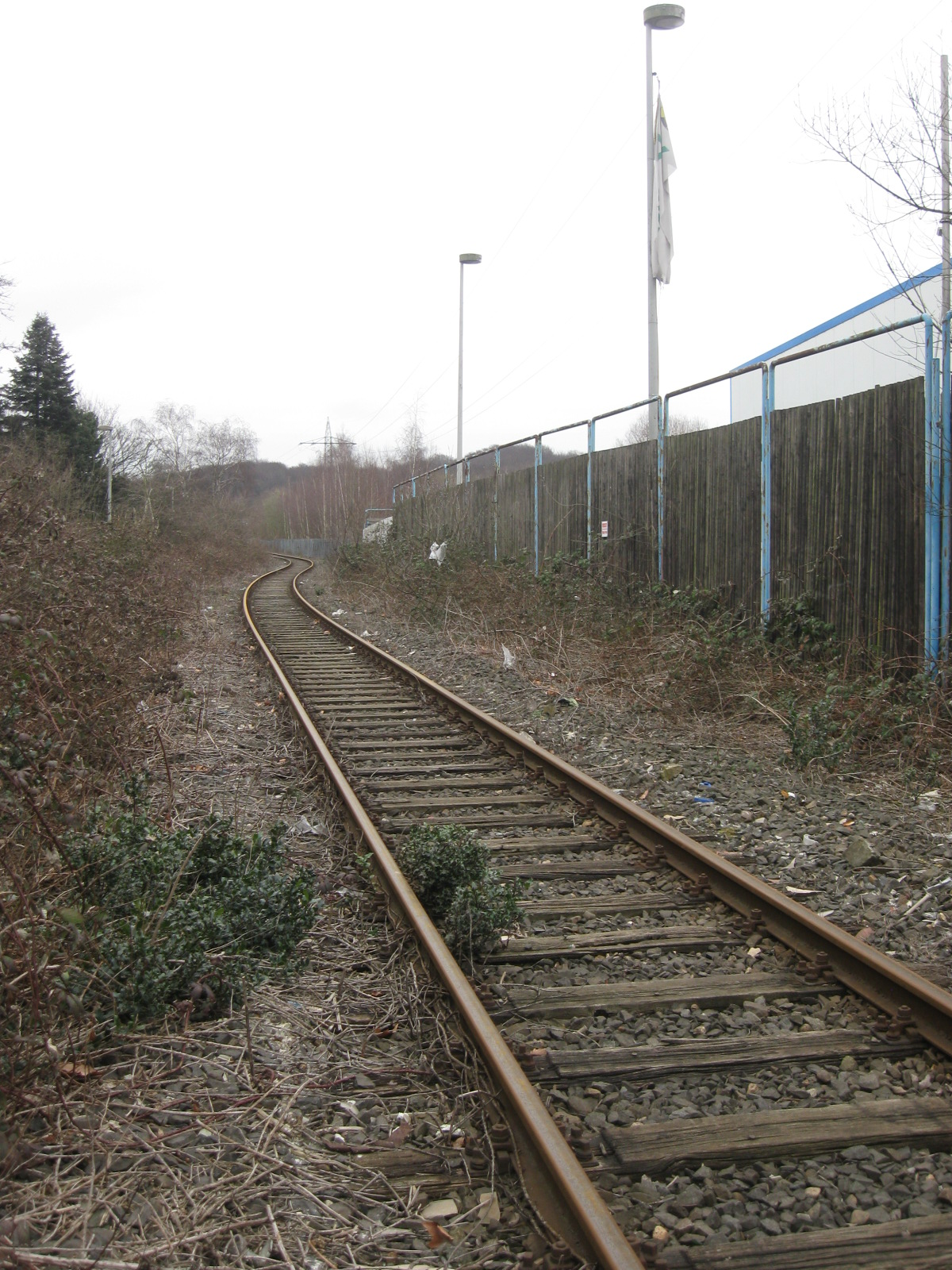
The tracks between Oberhausen and Bottrop allow only slow (40 km/h max) movements

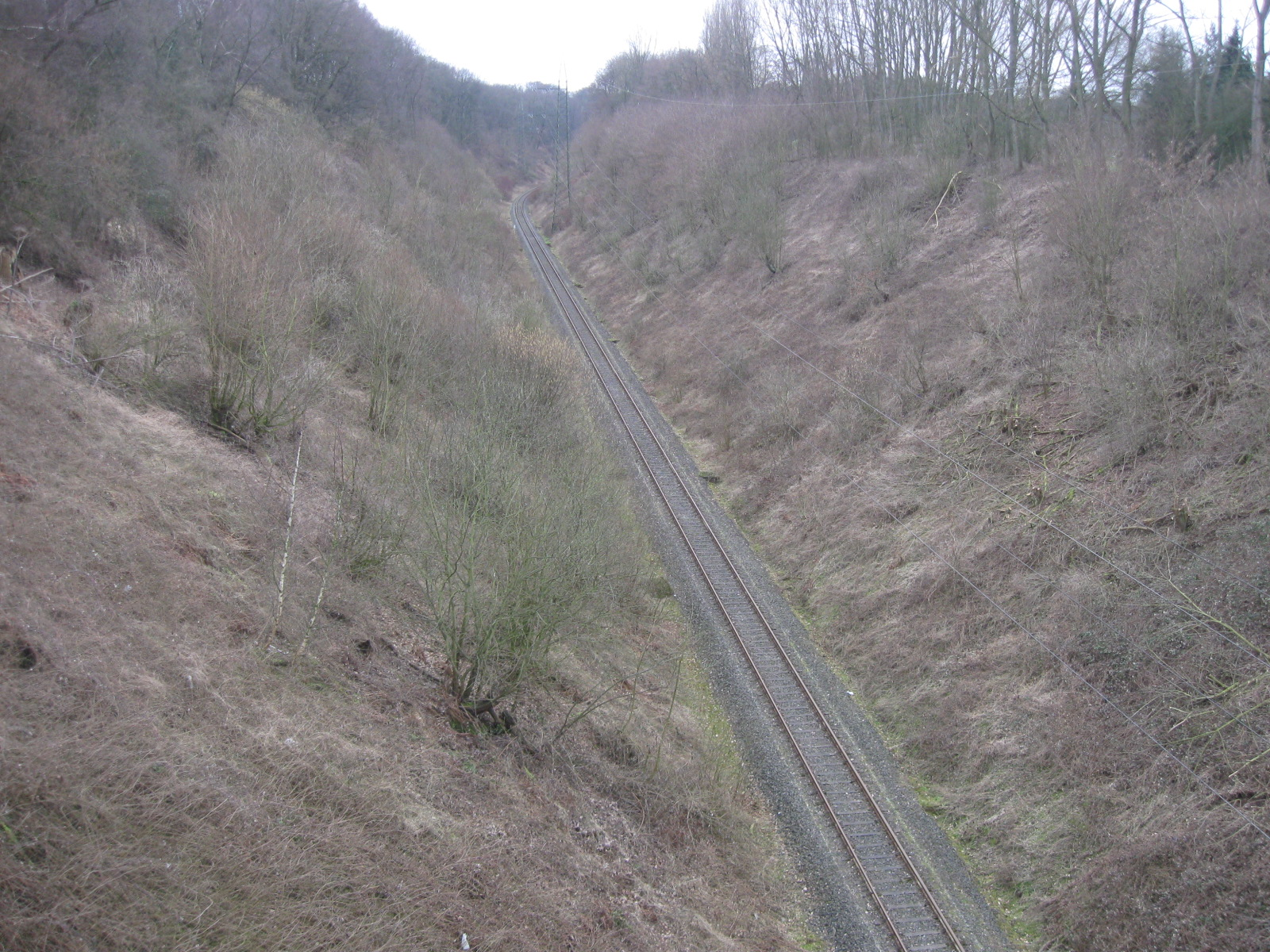
Near Sterkrader Straße in Bottrop the line runs through a deep cutting

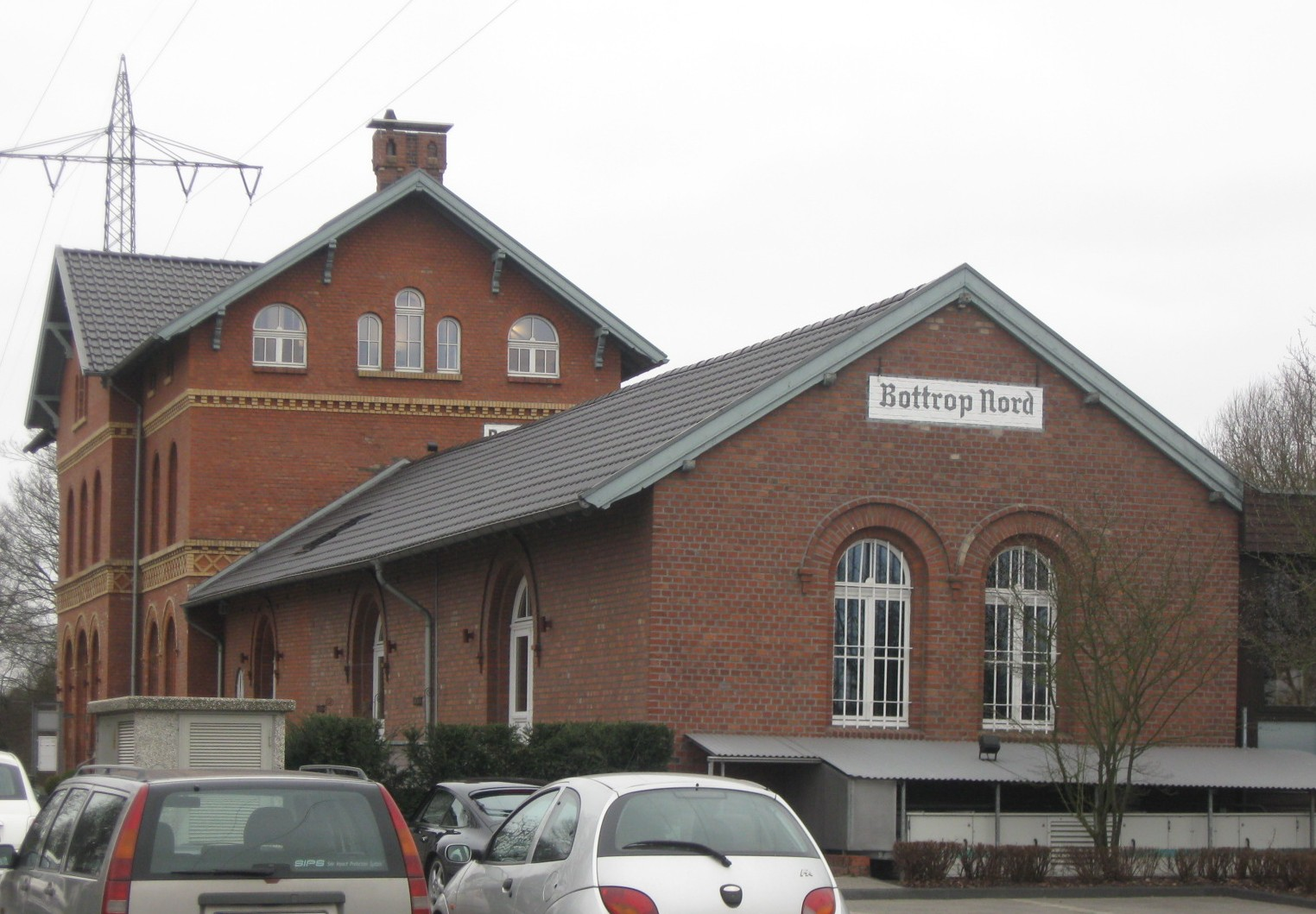
The former Bottrop Nord station building now houses a restaurant as well a legal practice

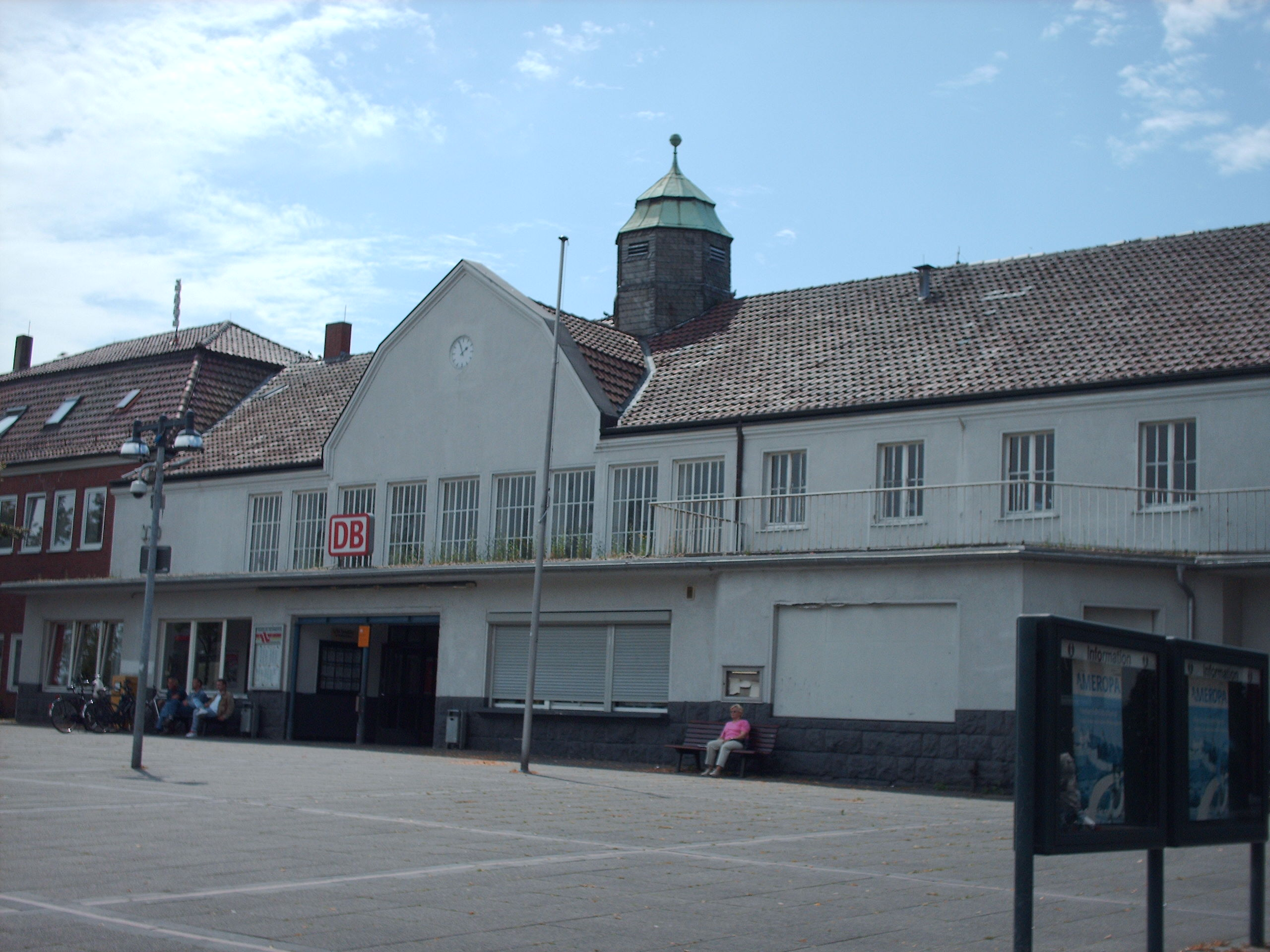
Coesfeld station

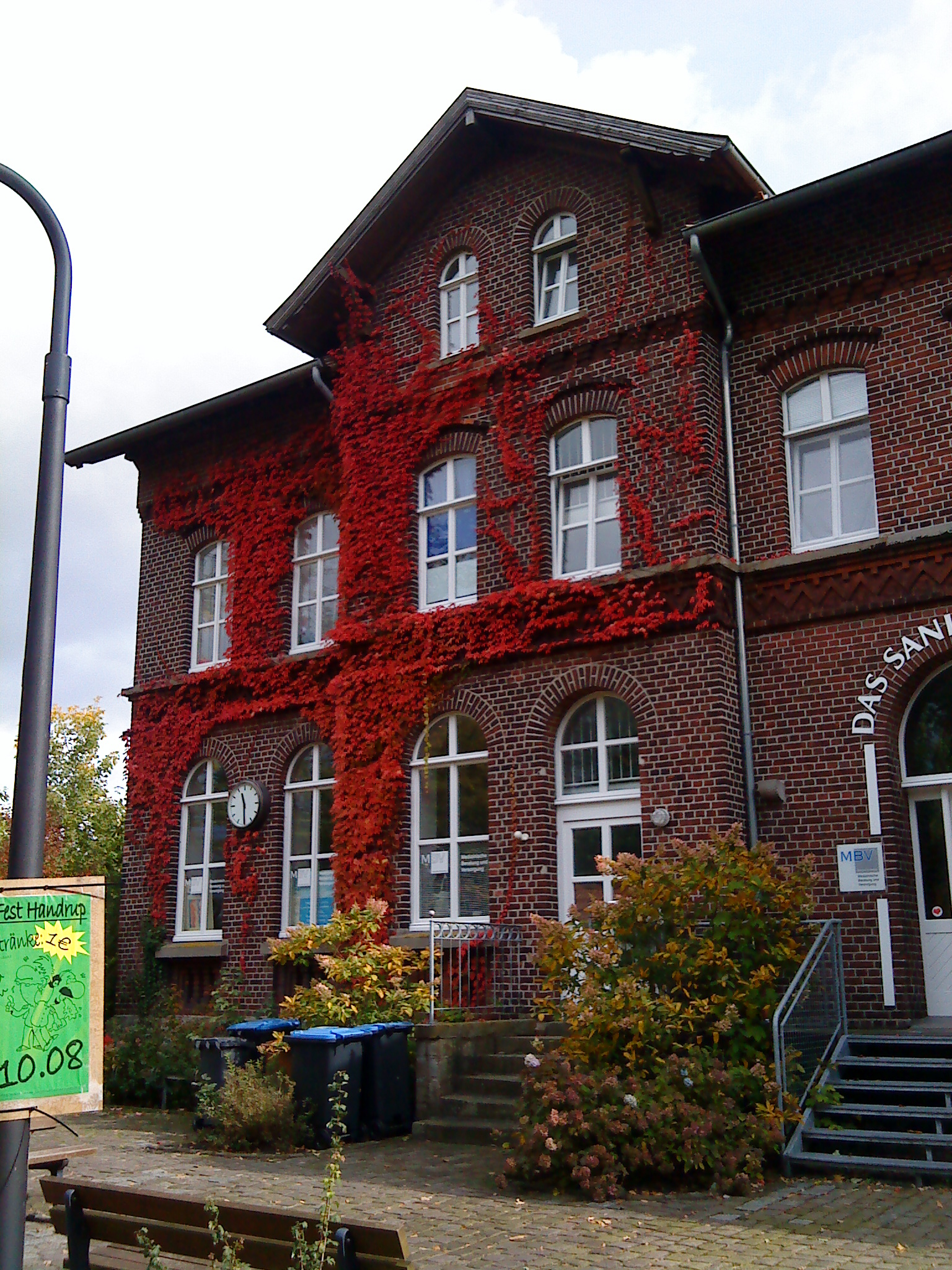
Spelle station (2008)

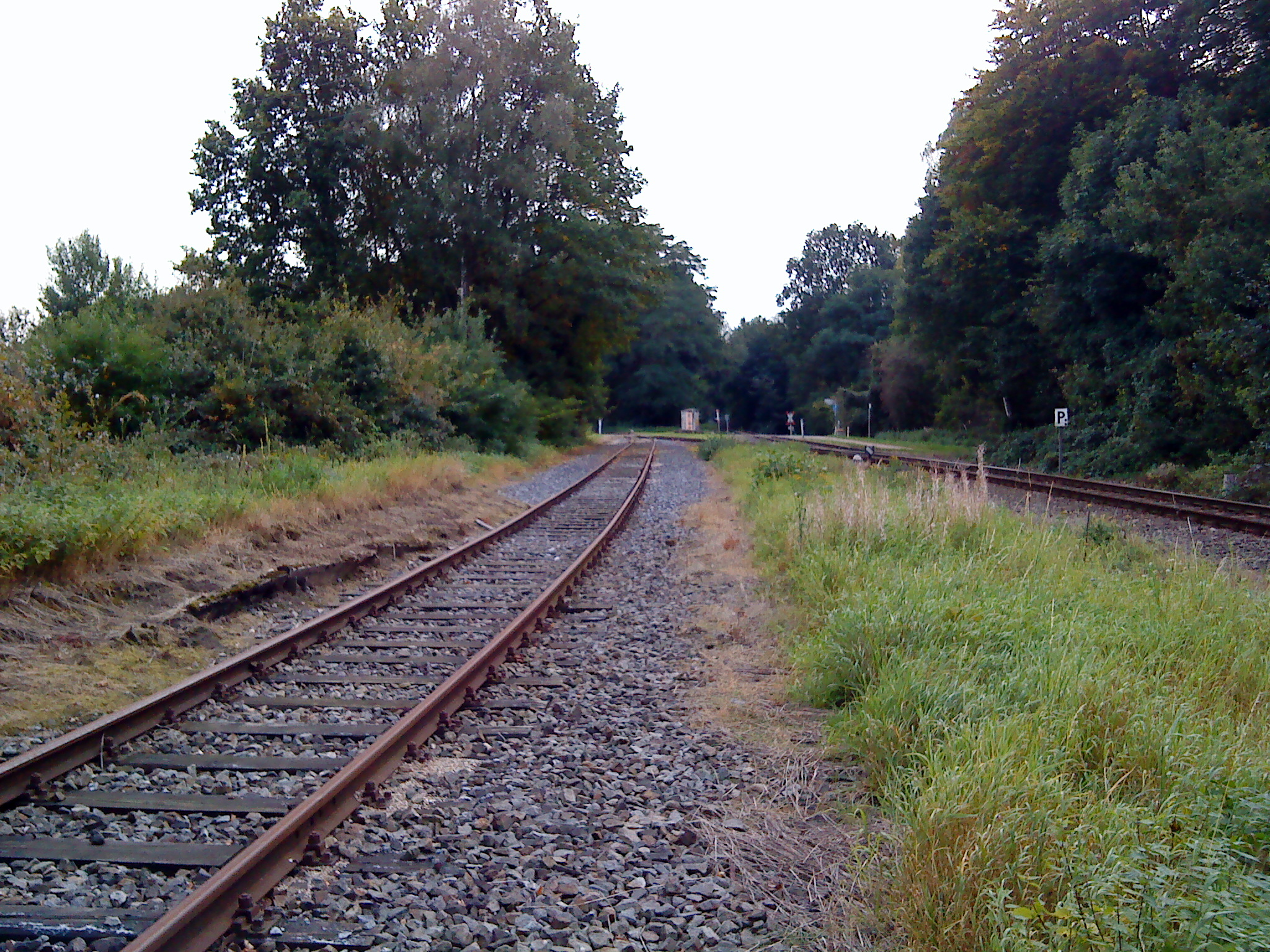
Connecting curve to Tecklenburg North Railway in Altenrheine

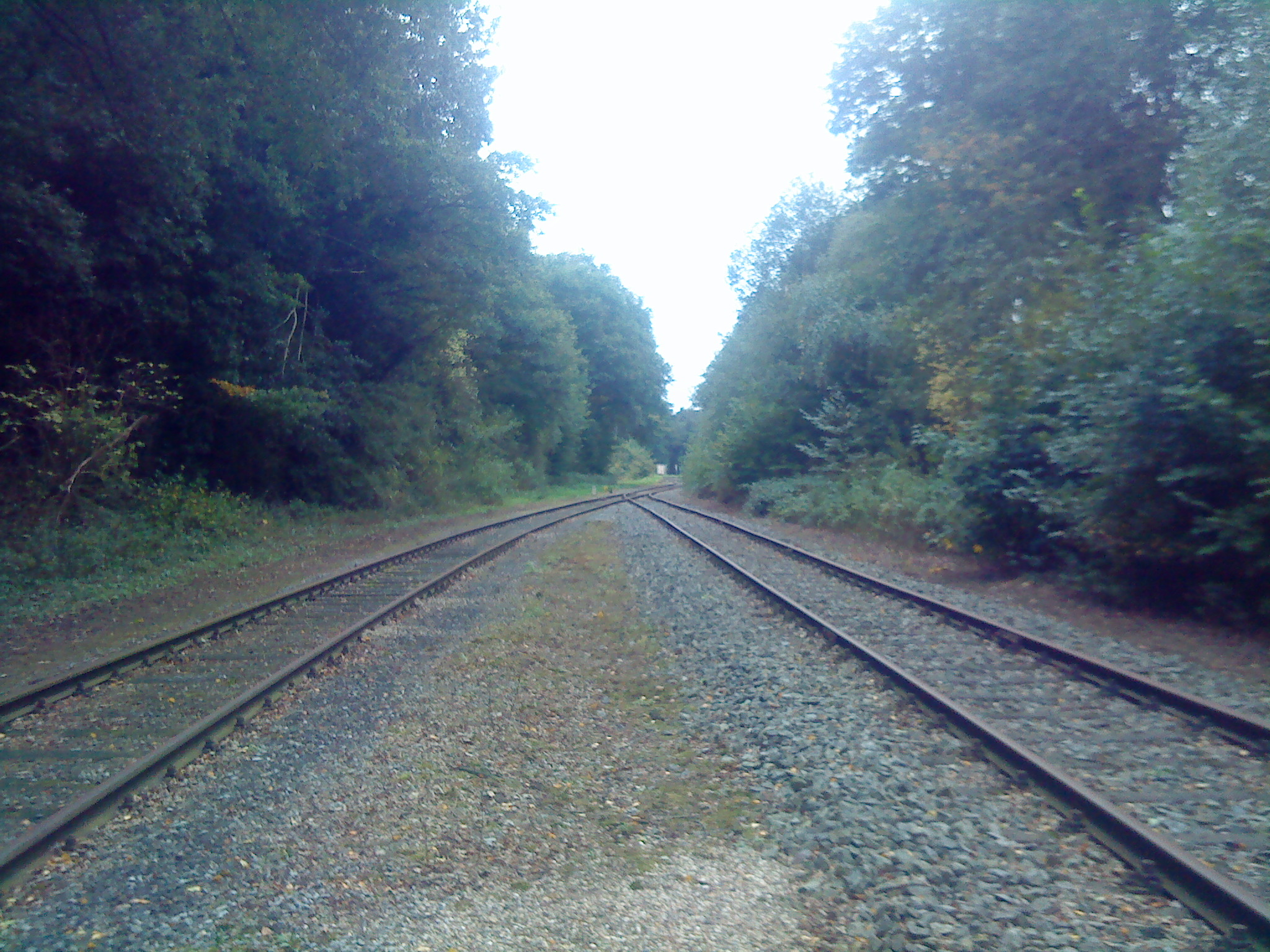
View of two sidings in Altenrheine, 2009

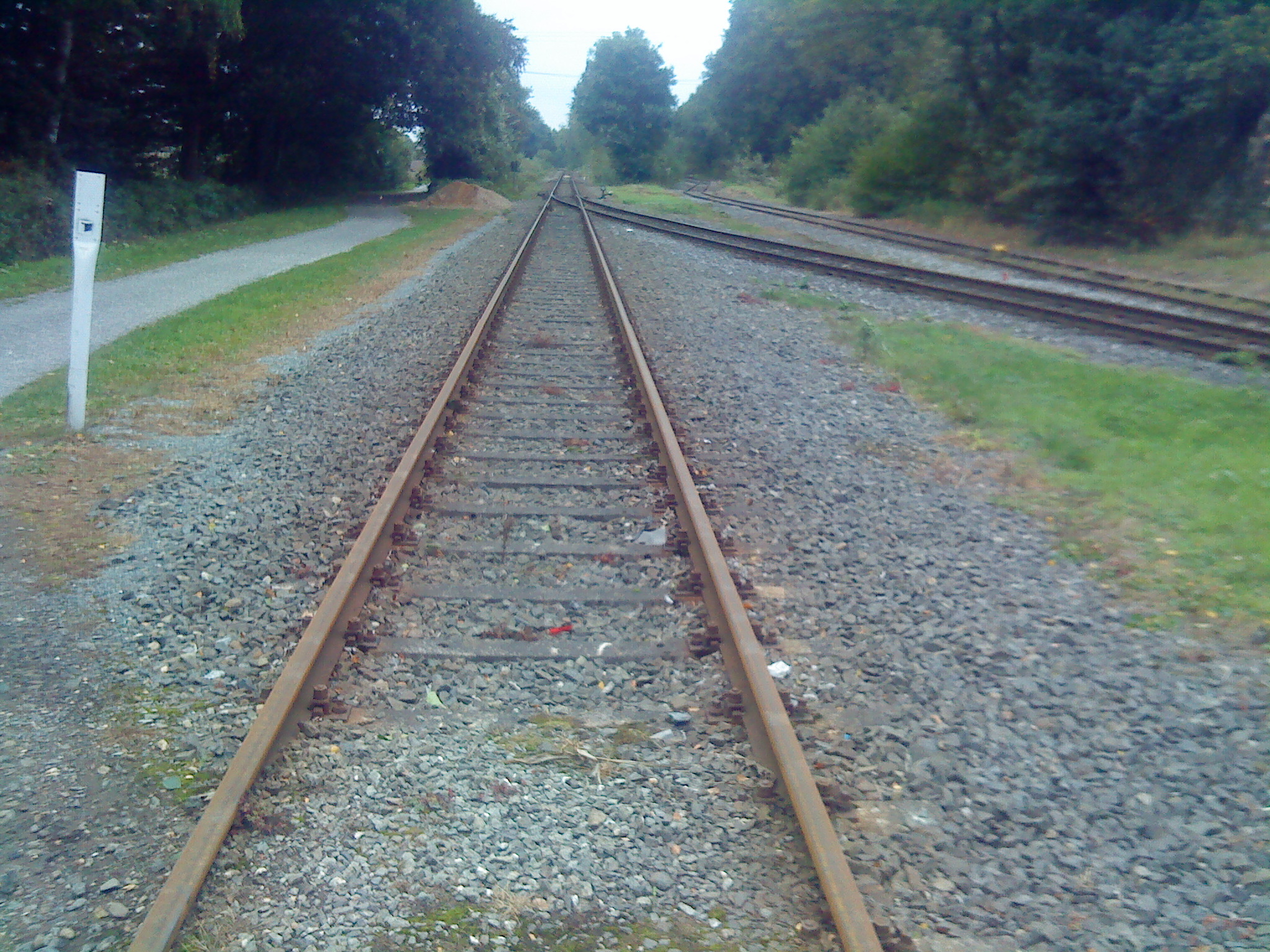
View of the line towards Spelle, 2009
