= Coesfeld Schulzentrum station =

Railway station in North Rhine-Westphalia, Germany

Coesfeld Schulzentrum
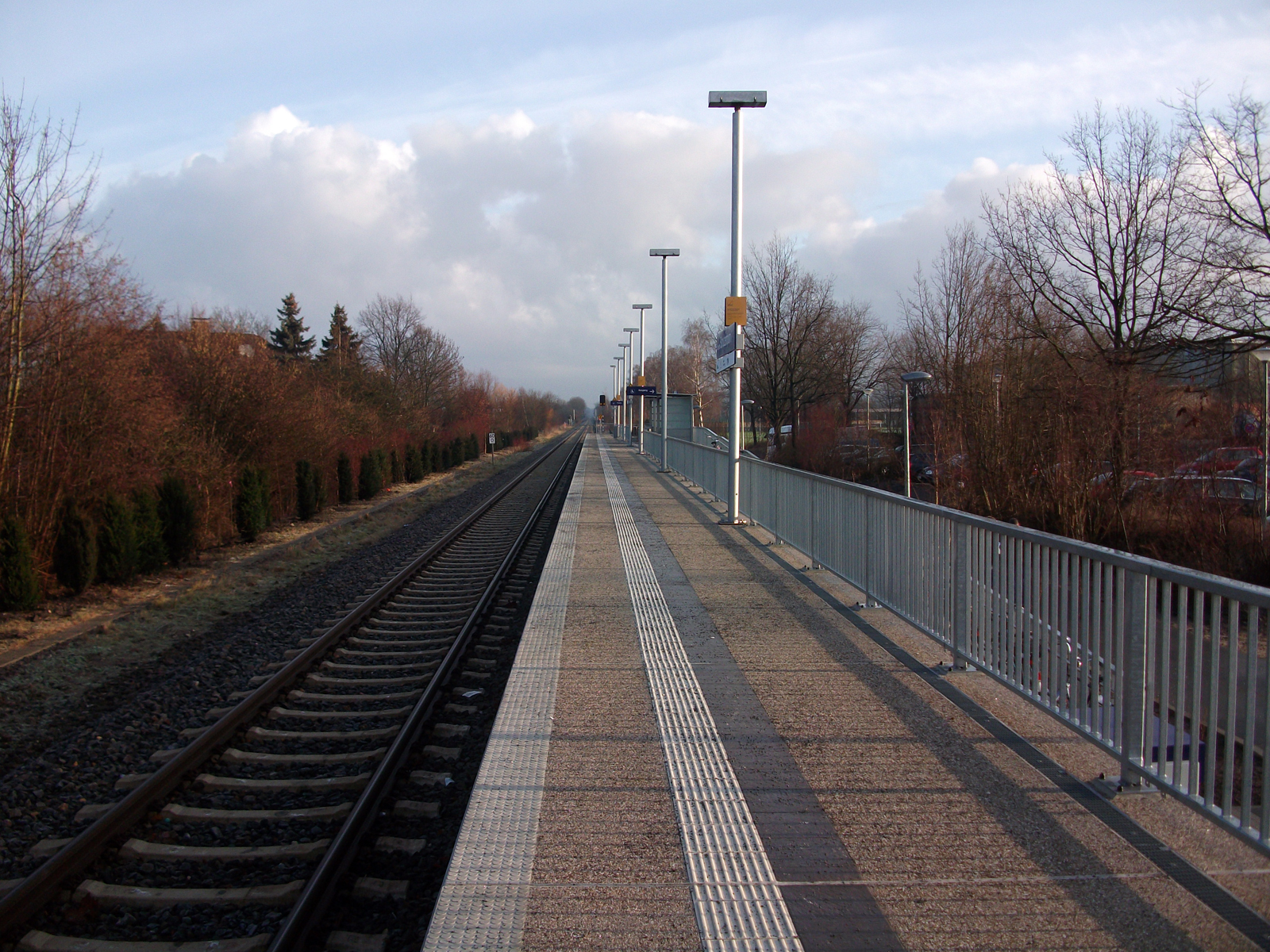
- Coesfeld Schulzentrum railway station

General information
- Location: Coesfeld, NRW; Germany
- Coordinates: 51°57′04″N 7°09′58″E
- Line: Empel-Rees–Münster railway
- Platforms: 1
- Tracks: 1

Construction
- Accessible: Yes

Other information
- Fare zone: Westfalentarif: 55621
- Website: www.bahnhof.de

History
- Opened: 2011

Services
Preceding station	DB Regio NRW	Following station
Coesfeld (Westf) Terminus	RB 63	Lutum towards Münster-Zentrum Nord
Location

Coesfeld Schulzentrum (German: Bahnhof Coesfeld Schulzentrum) is a railway station in the town of Coesfeld, North Rhine-Westphalia, Germany. The station lies on the Coesfeld–Münster railway and the train services are operated by Deutsche Bahn. The station is positioned near the Schulzentrum Coesfeld, giving the station's name, as well as Gymnasiums Nepomucenum and Heriburg. The station was opened on 10 June 2011.

== Train services ==
The station is served by the following services:

- Local service RB 63 Coesfeld - Münster
