= Duisburg-Wedau–Bottrop Süd railway =

Overview
- Line number: 2321 (Duisburg-Wedau–Oberhausen West); 2323 (Duisburg-Hochfeld Süd–Sigle); 2320 (Sigle–Oberhausen West); 2280 (Oberhausen West–Essen-Frintrop); 2244 (Essen-Frintrop–Prosper-Levin); 2243 (Prosper-Levin–Bottrop Süd); 2242 (Gerschede–Bottrop Hbf Gbf)
- Locale: North Rhine-Westphalia, Germany

Service
- Route number: (only freight)

Technical
- Line length: 23 km (14 mi)
- Track gauge: 1,435 mm (4 ft 8 1/2 in) standard gauge
- Electrification: 15 kV/16.7 Hz AC overhead catenary
- Operating speed: 80 km/h (50 mph)

The Duisburg-Wedau–Bottrop Süd railway is a railway used only for freight in the German state of North Rhine-Westphalia. It runs from the former Duisburg-Wedau freight yard as well as from the Duisburg-Hochfeld Süd freight yard via Oberhausen West freight yard to Bottrop Süd freight yard. The railway connects these and many other important lines in Duisburg, Oberhausen and Bottrop. In particular, it provides a connection to the Duisburg and Ruhrort river ports.

Strictly speaking, the four-track railway on the eastern outskirts of Duisburg is used by a total of three different routes from the Lotharstraße overpass in Duisburg-Neudorf to the overpass over Obermeidericher Straße in Duisburg-Obermeiderich, running largely parallel with Autobahn 3.

At Walzwerk junction (northeast of Oberhausen and Oberhausen West freight yard) the line infrastructure (VzG) numbers change. All six VzG routes are now classified as main lines, have two tracks and are electrified.

== History ==
After the Prussian state railways had taken over all the major private railway companies in the 1880s, the various rail networks had to be integrated effectively. Although networks of the Cologne-Minden Railway Company (CME), the Bergisch-Märkische Railway Company (BME) and the Rhenish Railway Company (RhE) were quite connected, at times the lines were separated and elsewhere they ran parallel. After the nationalisation, many lines had repeated connections but could not be operated optimally.

The RhE’s Troisdorf–Mülheim-Speldorf railway ran parallel to the Cologne–Duisburg railway built by the CME and connected with Duisburg station (now called Duisburg Hauptbahnhof) before its nationalisation. From there, the RhE’s Duisburg–Quakenbrück railway ran towards Oberhausen again roughly parallel to the Duisburg–Dortmund railway (and the Wanne-Eickel–Hamburg railway) of the CME.

Since both lines of the RhE had never had great importance for passenger services, these are now used mainly for freight and the Oberhausen West passenger station (formerly Oberhausen RhE station) was closed before 1897, with passenger services being transferred to the CME lines.

A freight yard was built in place of the former Rhenish station, which had several ladder crossovers and more than seventy shunting and sorting tracks. On 1 June 1891, a new connection was created to the Oberhausen-Osterfeld Süd freight yard on the Duisburg-Ruhrort–Dortmund railway (formerly CME).

Then, on 1 October 1901, a completely new, two-track line was taken into operation on the eastern outskirts of Duisburg, running directly from Duisburg-Wedau freight yard to Düssern junction (now Sigle junction) to avoid through freight trains going through Duisburg station.

Ten years later, the bypass line was extended parallel to the existing line to Oberhausen West as a double-track line, at the same time an additional double-track line was opened from Duisburg-Hochfeld Süd freight yard to Düssern junction on 17 September 1911. Thus, the line between Lotharstraße junction and Walzwerk junction now had four tracks.

== Current situation ==
Electrification of the lines was completed on 27 May 1962. Oberhausen West freight yard today consists of a receiving yard lying to the east, a marshalling yard, and departure yard and a connecting yard with the tracks of the private railway, Eisenbahn und Häfen GmbH (DK).

The Oro and Orm (Fdl) signal boxes control the receiving yard, Orm and Stw 2 boxes control the marshalling yard, Orm and Orw boxes control the departure yard, Orm and DK boxes control the DK area. The R1 signal box controls the hump. Signal box 1 at the west of the station controls scheduled train services towards the Port of Duisburg–Ruhrort, Duisburg-Meiderich, Duisburg-Ruhrtal and Stw 2 and Orw signal boxes at Oberhausen West.

From 1998 to 2006 the "Oberhausen node" was completely transformed. The four-track entry and exit from Oberhausen West Oro signal box to Walzwerk junction was reduced to two tracks and connected to the Oberhausen–Arnhem railway (Holland line). The link to Oberhausen Hbf Obo was reduced to a single track.

The Mathilde–Oberhausen West Oro–Oberhausen Hbf curve was removed and attached by a single track to the Holland line. In the opposite direction the connection to Oberhausen West from the Holland line to Oberhausen West freight yard became a tangent at Oro junction. Trains from Ruhrtal junction from the port of Duisburg-Ruhrort and Duisburg-Beeck go towards Oberhausen Hbf Obo and then reach Oberhausen West from the east; in the opposite direction the tracks are still connected directly at Mathilde junction.

At the end of the 1990s, a link was built from Ruhrtal junction to Duisburg-Ruhrort port freight yard, the "south curve", which allows direct access to the port freight yard from the south. Trains no longer have to reverse at Oberhausen West. A new single-track bridge was built over the Rhine-Herne Canal for this connection.

The line speed is generally 80 km/h, but in places it is 70 km/h, 60 km/h or 40 km/h.

In December 2006, the Duisburg electronic signalling centre at Duisburg Wedau was put into operation. Two local dispatchers control operations on the Tiefenbroich–Duisburg-Wedau and the Duisburg-Mannesmann–Mülheim (Ruhr)-Speldorf sections.

In the summer of 2008, the Mathilde signal box took over control of the departure yard from Duirburg-Ruhrort port station. All other DB signal boxes there are now closed and replaced by electrically operated points. A signal box at Duirburg port remains in operation.

Remodeling of the tracks around Oberhausen West yard is continuing and will take years to complete.
