= Borken (Westf) station =

Railway station in Borken, Germany

Borken (Westf)
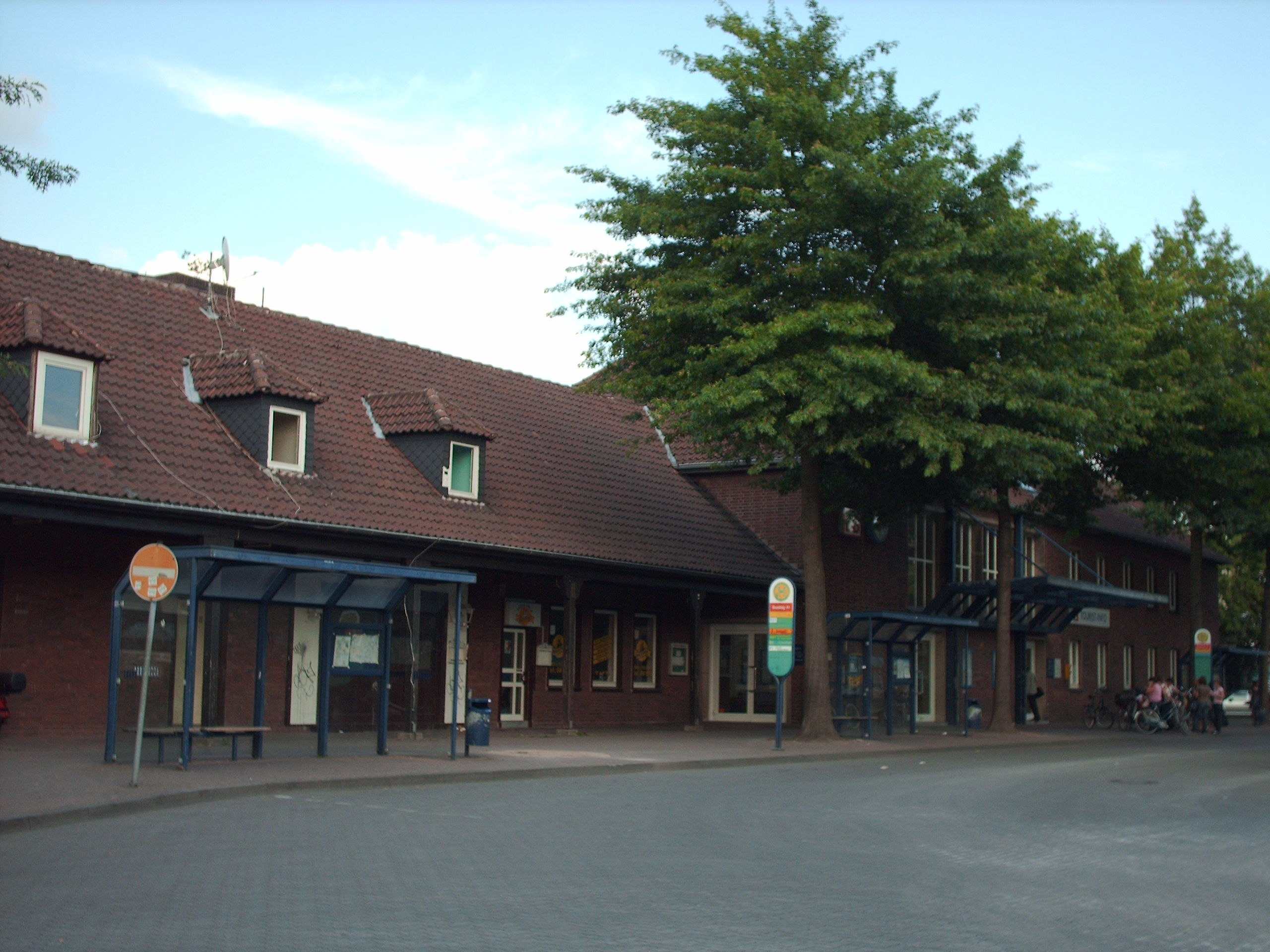

General information
- Location: Borken, NRW; Germany
- Coordinates: 51°50′55″N 6°51′56″E
- Lines: Bismarck–Winterswijk (KBS 423); Empel-Rees–Münster railway (most recently KBS 286); Borken–Burgsteinfurt (most recently KBS 287)
- Platforms: 1

Construction
- Accessible: Yes

Other information
- Station code: 785
- DS100 code: EBK
- Category: 6
- Fare zone: Westfalentarif: 57651
- Website: www.bahnhof.de

History
- Opened: 21 June 1880

Services
Preceding station	NordWestBahn	Following station
Terminus	RE 14	Marbeck-Heiden towards Essen Hbf
Location

Borken (Westf) station (German: Bahnhof Borken (Westf)) is the main station of the town of Borken and important transport hub of west Münsterland in the German state of North Rhine-Westphalia.

Borken station is a former railway junction on the Gelsenkirchen-Bismarck–Winterswijk railway, the Empel-Rees–Münster railway and the Borken–Steinfurt railway. Since 1996, it has been the terminus of the only section of the Gelsenkirchen-Bismarck–Winterswijk line that is still operating.

== History ==
The Dutch Westphalian Railway (NWE) began to build its Gelsenkirchen-Bismarck–Winterswijk line in 1878. It opened it together with the line from Borken-Gemen station as a through station on 21 June 1880. It was named Borken (Westphalia) station on 6 March 1883.

The Prussian state railways (PSE) took over the line of the NWE in 1889. On 1 August 1902, it opened the Empel-Rees–Münster railway from Bocholt station, making Borken station into a railway junction. Just two months later, on 1 October 1902, the Westfälische Landes-Eisenbahn (Westphalian Lands Railway, WLE) opened its terminus of the Borken–Steinfurt line nearby. On 1 October 1904, the PSE opened the Borken-Coesfeld section of the Empel-Rees–Münster line.

== Operations ==
Borken station is now served only by a single Regional-Express service. This is like a Stadt-Express service, as it stops on the section south of Gladbeck West only at the most important stations, while each station is served on the northern section:

Line	Route	Operator	Frequency
RE 14 Emscher-Münsterland-Express	Borken – Hervest-Dorsten – Dorsten – Gladbeck West – Bottrop – Essen	NWB	30 min

=== Bus services ===
Line	Route
713	Borken station - Borken Alter Kirchplatz - Reken station - Reken Babarastr. - Klein Reken
723	Borken station - Borken cemetery - Marbeck-Heiden station - Marbeck Bente - Borken station
724	Nünning-Realschule - Borken station - Borken cemetery - Marbeck Denkmal - Marbeck-Heiden station - Rhade station
751	Nünning-Realschule - Borken station - Ramsdorf Ortsmitte - Holthausen Schule - Nordvelen Schlatt - Velen Ellinghaus
753	Borken Wilbecke - Borken station - Weseke Schlückersring - Stadtlohn Wessendorf - Wüllen Am Spieker - Ahaus station
754	Borken Jeanette-Wolf-Str. - Borken station - Borken Kettelerstr. - Borkenwirthe Epskamp - Burlo Kloster - Oeding level crossing - Südlohn Am Vereinshaus
851	Borken station - Borken cemetery - Westborken Schlöter - Hoxfeld Wüst - Rhedebrügge Ortsmitte - Westborken - An der Höchte
853	Borken Landwehr - Borken station - Borken Jahnstr. - Borken Wagnerstr. - Gemen-RotKreuz Zenter
854	Borken station - Borken Jahnstr. - Gemenwirthe Alte Mühle - Burlo Kloster
B8	Borken station - Gemen Evers - Weseke Im Brink - Weseke Südlohner Str. - Burlo Kloster - Borkenwirthe Hl.-Kreuz-Kirchen - Grütlohn Jünck - Borken cemetery - Borken station
B9	Borken station - Borken cemetery - Westenborken Schlöter - Rhedebrügge Ortsmitte - Rhedebrügge Heselhaus - Grütlohn Grütering - Borken cemetery - Borken station
N20	Bocholt Bustreff/bus station - Bocholt station - Borken station - Gemen Ortsmitte - Velen Ellinghaus - Flamschen Emmerick - Coesfeld station - Höven Kreuzung - Legden Dorf Münsterland
R21/VRR295	Borken station - Borken cemetery - Marbeck Waidmannsheil - Raesfeld Kirche - Erle cemetery - Schermbeck Försterei Müller - Rhade Ort - Rhade station - Deuten station - Deuten Mitte - Dorsten bus station / Dorsten station
R51	Bocholt Bustreff/bus station - Bocholt station - Hoxfeld Kaninchenberg - Borken Sägewerk - Borken station - Velen Ellinghaus - Hochmoor Sparkasse - Gescher Lanfer - Goxel Klye - Coesfeld station
R74	Please see timetable
R76	Please see timetable
S75	Bocholt Bustreff/bus station - Rhede Gudulakirche - Borken station - Merfeld church - Münster Inselbogen - Münster Hauptbahnhof
