= Empel-Rees–Münster railway =

Railway in Germany

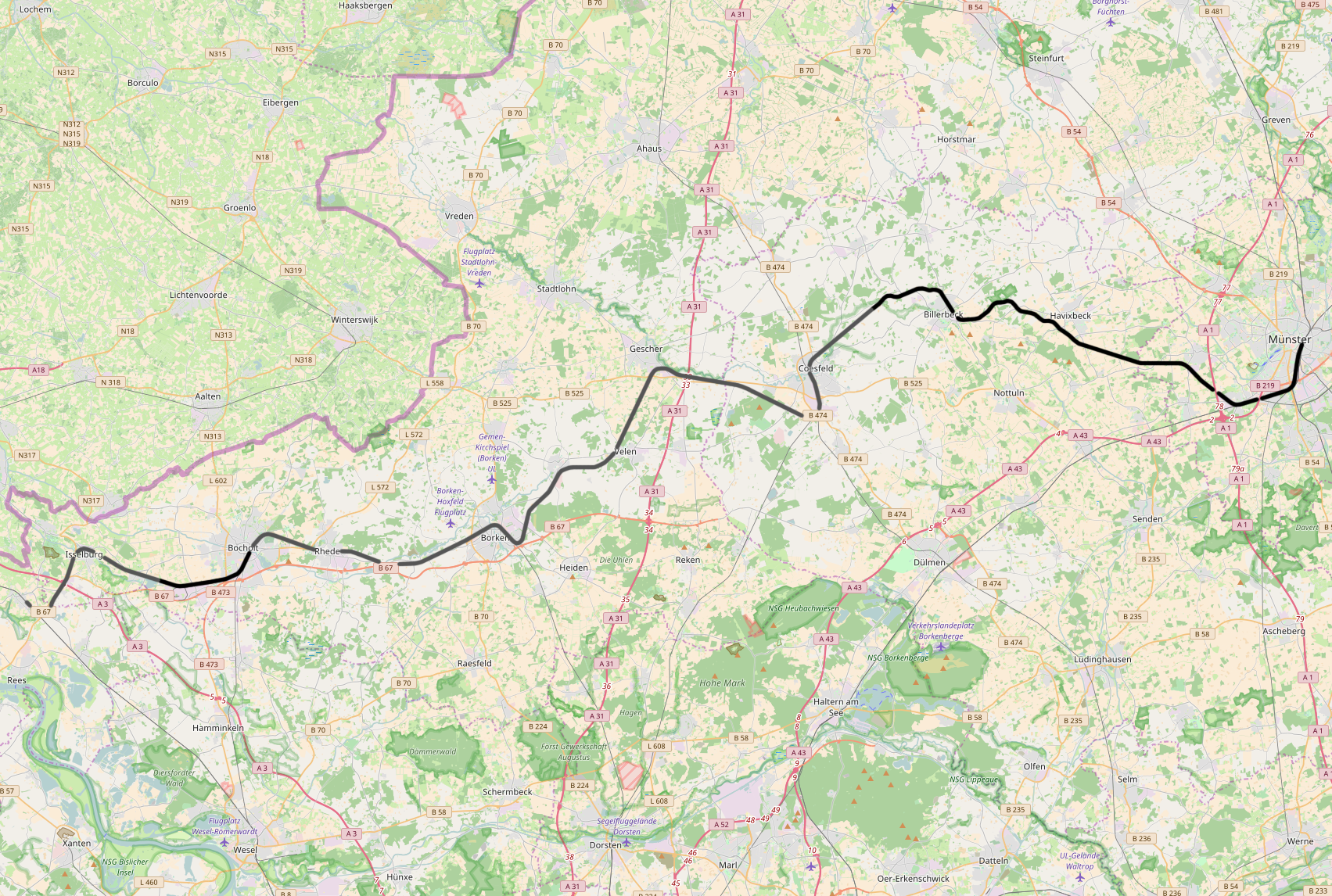

Overview
- Line number: 2265
- Termini: Empel-Rees; Münster Hauptbahnhof

Service
- Route number: 408

History
- Opened: 1908

Technical
- Track length: 110 km (68 mi)
- Track gauge: 1435
- Operating speed: 100 km/h (62 mph)

The Empel-Rees–Münster railway is a German regional railway that formerly connected Empel-Rees, Bocholt, Borken and Coesfeld with Münster. Today, only the eastern part of the line from Coesfeld/Lutum to Münster (Baumberge railway) as well as a freight track in Bocholt are in use.

== History ==
The line was opened in 1908 by the Prussian state railways to access the western Münsterland. Besides some freight traffic, the railway never gained interregional importance.

Passenger train services from Empel-Rees to Isselburg-Anholt were discontinued on September 30, 1961 and from Isselburg-Anholt to Coesfeld on May 26, 1974. Freight service mostly ended by June 1, 1991.

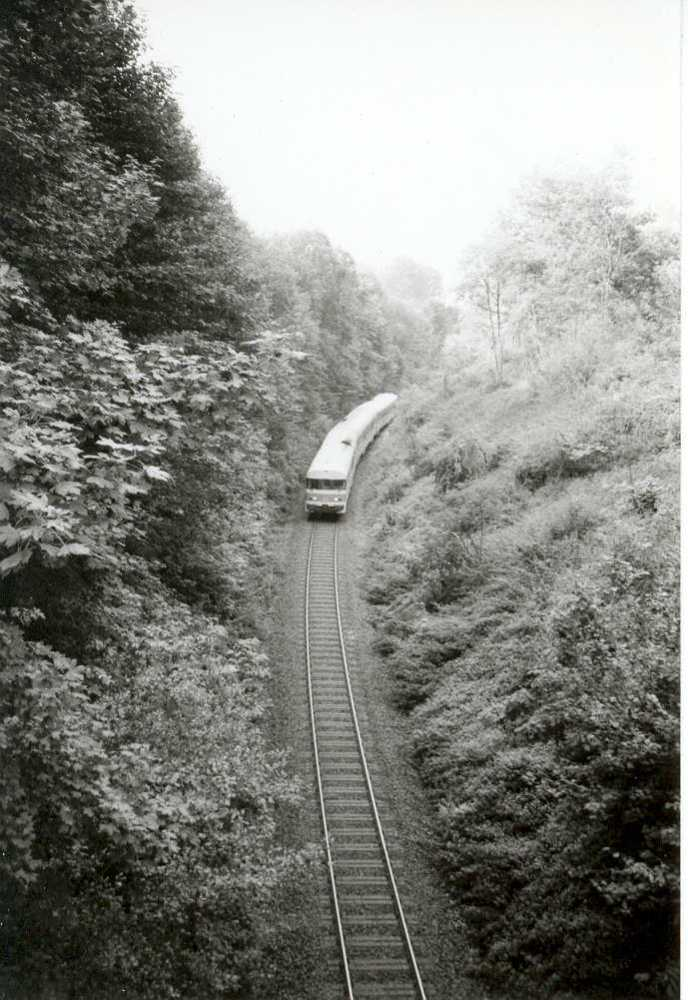
Train between Billerbeck and Havixbeck

In 1994, traffic between Coesfeld and Lutum was diverted to the track of the decommissioned railway to Rheine, as it was preserved better than the Baumberge railway.

== Service ==
Today, the regional train RB 63 from Münster to Coesfeld via Münster-Mecklenbeck, Münster-Roxel, Havixbeck, Billerbeck, Lutum and Coesfeld Schulzentrum, operated by DB Regio with Talent-railcars, runs once an hour (weekends) or twice an hour (during rush hours).
