= Coesfeld (Westf) station =

Railway station in North Rhine-Westphalia, Germany

Coesfeld (Westf)
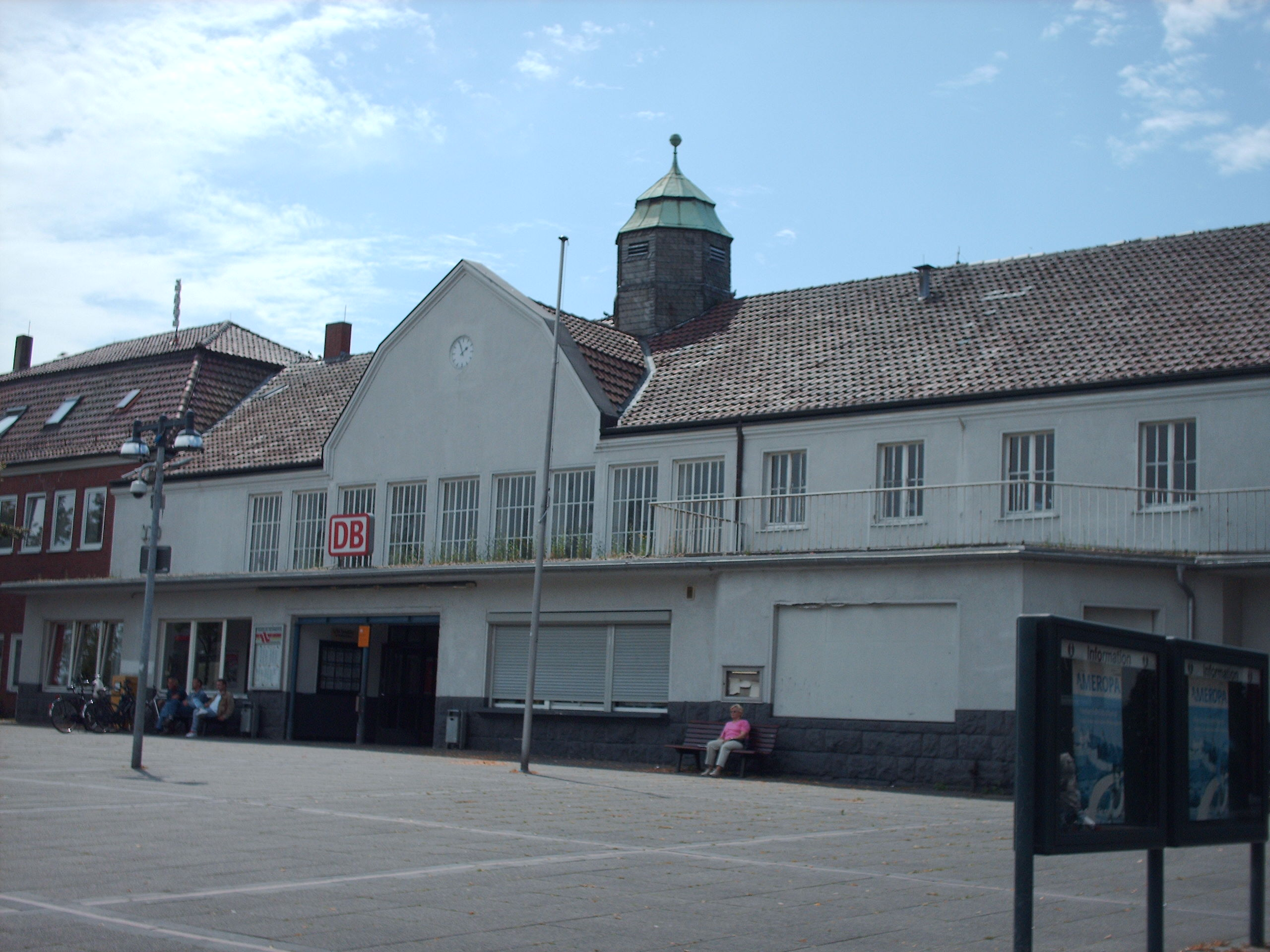

General information
- Location: Coesfeld, NRW; Germany
- Coordinates: 51°56′22″N 7°9′52″E
- Lines: Coesfeld–Münster (KBS 408); Dortmund–Gronau (KBS 412); Coesfeld–Essen (KBS 423)
- Platforms: 4

Construction
- Accessible: Yes

Other information
- Station code: 1062
- DS100 code: ECMF
- IBNR: 8000066
- Category: 5
- Fare zone: Westfalentarif: 55621
- Website: www.bahnhof.de

History
- Opened: 1 August 1875

Services
Preceding station	NordWestBahn	Following station
Terminus	RE 14	Maria Veen towards Essen Hbf
Preceding station	DB Regio NRW	Following station
Rosendahl-Holtwick towards Enschede	RB 51	Lette (Kr Coesfeld) towards Dortmund Hbf
Coesfeld Schulzentrum towards Münster-Zentrum Nord	RB 63	Terminus
Location

Coesfeld Station (Westphalia) is the main railway station of the town of Coesfeld and an important transport hub in western Münsterland in the German state of North Rhine-Westphalia. It is a junction station on the Dortmund–Gronau, Essen-Coesfeld and Empel-Rees–Münster lines.

== History ==
The Dortmund-Gronau-Enschede Railway Company (German: Dortmund-Gronau-Enscheder Eisenbahn-Gesellschaft, DGE) began to build its line from Dortmund in 1874. On 1 August 1875, it opened Coesfeld Station (Westphalia) at the end of the section from Dülmen East. Nearly two months later, another section was opened to Gronau, so that Coesfeld station became a through station.

The Wanne-Eickel–Hamburg railway of the Cologne-Minden Railway Company was of great national importance and the Rhenish Railway Company (Rheinische Eisenbahn-Gesellschaft, RhE) planned its Duisburg–Quakenbrück railway to compete with it. With the completion of this line on 1 July 1879, Coesfeld station became a “crossing” station (Kreuzungsbahnhof). The Rhenish line originally crossed the DGE line to the south of Coesfeld.

In 1880, the RhE was the first of the Prussian railways to be nationalised and in 1903 the DGE was one of the last of the (nominally) private railway companies to be absorbed by the Prussian state railways (PSE). It had already begun to build its line from Empel-Rees to Borken around the turn of the century. On 1 October 1904, the new line reached Coesfeld and crossed the two existing lines south of the station. The line was extended to Billerbeck on 1 March 1908 and the last section of the line was completed to Havixbeck on 1 May 1908.

The original weatherboard station building was demolished in 1910 and replaced by the existing building.

The number of passengers in western Münsterland declined in the second half of the 20th century. None of the lines had ever played a significant national role. On 26 May 1974, passenger services on the western part of the Empel-Rees–Münster line from Isselburg-Anholt to Coesfeld were abandoned. Ten years later, passenger services were abandoned on the northern section of the Rhenish line from Coesfeld to Rheine.

In the early 1990s, several modifications of the tracks began. The exit from Coesfeld station towards Ahaus (infrastructure line number (VzG) 2100) was realigned until 28 August 1993. Traffic on the Empel-Rees–Münster line (VzG 2265) towards Münster was transferred to the Duisburg–Quakenbrück tracks on 13 November 1994 and its original track to Lutum were dismantled. The section of the Duisburg-Quakenbrück (VzG 2273) from Lutum to St. Arnold was completely closed on 1 January 1996 and has since been partly dismantled.

Now there were no through passenger services on either the Empel-Rees–Münster line or on the Duisburg–Quakenbrück line. The elaborate grade-separated southern exit from the station had thus become superfluous. The exit towards Dülmen (VzG 2100) was moved on 30 November 1997 to the route of the former line to Borken (VzG 2265).

In 2008, construction started on the Coesfeld (Westphalia) Cf interlocking, an electronic interlocking of class SIMIS-D and ZSB 2000. In the period up to 2012, this took over the functions of the three mechanical signal boxes in Coesfeld and, by remote control, signalling at the stations of Steinfurt-Burgsteinfurt (26 October 2008), Altenberge (9 November 2008), Gronau (Westfalen) and Ochtrup (both on 12 October 2008), Beelen, Telgte and Warendorf (all three 26 in October 2009), Ahaus and Epe (Westf) (22 November 2010), and most recently Billerbeck and Havixbeck (29 January 2012).

After a €6.5 million renovation, including the replacement of the old pedestrian tunnel with a new underpass with three lifts and the relaying of the tracks, Coesfeld station is now a modern, accessible station. It was officially inaugurated on 18 January 2013 in the presence of the transport minister of North Rhine-Westphalia, Michael Groschek.

== Train services ==
Westfalen-Tarif

The station is served by the following services:

- Local service RE 14 Essen - Bottrop - Gladbeck - Dorsten - Coesfeld
- Local service RB 51 Enschede - Gronau - Coesfeld - Lünen - Dortmund
- Local service RB 63 Coesfeld - Münster

The station is located in the fare association Westfalen-Tarif.

== Bus services ==
Coesfeld station is served by a number of bus services:

- R51 Coesfeld - Gescher - Velen - Borken - Rhede - Bocholt
- R61 Coesfeld - Hochmoor - Gescher - Stadtlohn - Vreden
- R62 Coesfeld - Darup - Nottuln
- R81 Coesfeld - Darfeld - Horstmar - Leer - Burgsteinfurt
- 580 Coesfeld - Lette - Merfeld - Dülmen
- 711 Coesfeld - Flamschen - Stevede - Groß Reken
- 781 Coesfeld - Holtwick - Legden - Ahaus - Epe - Gronau
